= 2018 local electoral calendar =

Worldwide local elections held in 2018

This local electoral calendar for 2018 lists the subnational elections held in 2018. Referendums, retention elections, and national by-elections (special elections) are also included.

== January ==
- 5–6 January: Czech Republic, Trutnov, Senate by-election (1st round)
- 12–13 January: Czech Republic, Trutnov, Senate by-election (2nd round)
- 17 January: India, Madhya Pradesh, Municipal Councils
- 24 January: Mozambique, Nampula, Mayor by-election (1st round)
- 27 January: Nigeria, Osun, Local Government Councils and Chairmen
- 28 January:
  - Austria, Lower Austria, Parliament
  - France, Territoire de Belfort and Val-d'Oise, National Assembly by-elections (1st round)
- 29 January: India, Ajmer, Alwar and Uluberia, House of the People by-elections

== February ==
- 4 February:
  - France, Territoire de Belfort and Val-d'Oise, National Assembly by-elections (2nd round)
  - Guinea, Municipal Councils
  - Japan
    - Nagasaki, Governor
    - Yamaguchi, Governor
  - Montenegro, Municipal Assemblies
- 6 February: United Kingdom, Wales, Alyn and Deeside, National Assembly by-election
- 8 February: Australia, Lord Howe Island, Board
- 10 February:
  - Nigeria, Kano, Local Government Councils and Chairmen
  - Sri Lanka, Municipal Councils, Urban Councils and Divisional Councils
- 12 February: Pakistan, NA-154, National Assembly by-election
- 13 February: United States, Oklahoma City, Mayor
- 18 February:
  - Belarus, Regional Councils, District Councils and Municipal Councils
  - India, Tripura, Legislative Assembly
- 25 February:
  - Austria, Tyrol, Parliament
  - Germany, Frankfurt, Mayor (1st round)
- 27 February: India
  - Meghalaya, Legislative Assembly
  - Nagaland, Legislative Assembly

== March ==
- 3 March:
  - Australia, Tasmania, House of Assembly
  - Nigeria, Edo, Local Government Councils and Chairmen
- 4 March:
  - Austria, Carinthia, Parliament
  - El Salvador, Mayors and Municipal Councils
  - France, French Guiana, National Assembly by-election (1st round)
  - Italy
    - Lazio, Regional Council
    - Lombardy, Regional Council
  - Serbia, Belgrade, City Assembly
  - Switzerland
    - Aargau, referendum
    - Appenzell Ausserrhoden, referendums
    - Basel-Landschaft, referendums
    - Basel-Stadt, referendums
    - Bern, referendums
    - Fribourg, referendums
    - Glarus, Executive Council
    - Jura, referendums
    - Lucerne, referendum
    - Nidwalden, Executive Council and Landrat
    - Obwalden, Executive Council (1st round) and Cantonal Council
    - Schaffhausen, referendum
    - Schwyz, referendums
    - St. Gallen, referendum
    - Valais, Constituent Assembly
    - Vaud, referendum
    - Zürich, referendum
      - Zürich City, Council
- 5 March: Jamaica, Saint Andrew North Western, House of Representatives by-election
- 7 March:
  - Belize, City Councils and Town Councils
  - Sierra Leone, District Chairs, District Councils, Mayors and Local Councils (1st round)
- 11 March:
  - Armenia, Mayors, Local Councils and Community Chiefs
  - Cuba, Provincial Assemblies
  - France
    - French Guiana, National Assembly by-election (2nd round)
    - Haute-Garonne, National Assembly by-election (1st round)
  - Germany, Frankfurt, Mayor (2nd round)
  - Hong Kong, Hong Kong Island, Kowloon West, New Territories East and Architectural, Surveying, Planning and Landscape, Legislative Council by-elections
  - India, Araria, Gorakhpur and Phulpur, House of the People by-elections
  - Japan, Ishikawa, Governor
- 12 March: India, Tripura, Charilam, Legislative Assembly state by-election
- 13 March:
  - Bangladesh, Brahmanbaria-1 and Gaibandha-1, House of the Nation by-election
  - United States, Pennsylvania's 18th congressional district, U.S. House of Representatives special election
- 14 March: Mozambique, Nampula, Mayor by-election (2nd round)
- 17 March: Australia
  - Batman, House of Representatives by-election
  - South Australia, House of Assembly and Legislative Council
- 18 March:
  - France
    - Haute-Garonne, National Assembly by-election (2nd round)
    - Loiret and Mayotte, National Assembly by-elections (1st round)
  - Mexico, Veracruz, Mayors and Municipal Councils special election
  - Russia, Volgograd Oblast, Time Zone referendum
- 20 March: United States, Cook County, Legalize Marijuana referendum
- 21 March: Netherlands, Municipal Councils
- 24 March: United States, Louisiana, Circuit Courts of Appeal special election
- 25 March:
  - France, Loiret and Mayotte, National Assembly by-elections (2nd round)
  - Switzerland, Bern, Executive Council and Grand Council
    - Bernese Jura, Council
  - Turkmenistan, District Councils and Municipal Councils
- 28 March: Namibia, Ncuncuni, National Assembly by-election
- 29 March: Bangladesh, Sub-district Councils and Union Councils, and Sub-district Council, Union Council and Ward by-elections
- 31 March: Sierra Leone, District Chairs, District Councils, Mayors and Local Councils (2nd round)

== April ==
- 3 April: United States
  - Anchorage, Mayor and Bathroom Bill referendum
  - Wisconsin, Supreme Court and Court of Appeals, and Elimination of State Treasurer constitutional referendum
- 8 April:
  - France, Overseas Residents, National Assembly by-election (1st round)
  - Japan, Kyoto, Governor
  - Switzerland, Obwalden, Executive Council (2nd round)
- 10 April: United States, Long Beach, Mayor and City Council (1st round)
- 12 April: The Gambia, Area Councils and City Councils
- 15 April:
  - France, Wallis and Futuna, National Assembly by-election
  - Germany, Thuringia, County Administrators and Mayors
  - Switzerland, Geneva, Council of State (1st round) and Grand Council
- 16 April: India, Jharkhand, Municipal Corporations
- 20 April: India, Mizoram, Chakma Autonomous District, Council
- 22 April:
  - Austria, Salzburg, Parliament
  - France, Overseas Residents, National Assembly by-election (2nd round)
  - Italy, Molise, Regional Council
  - Paraguay, Governors and Departmental Councils
- 23 April – 11 May: Australia, Melbourne, Lord Mayor by-election
- 24 April: United States, Arizona's 8th congressional district, U.S. House of Representatives special election
- 29 April:
  - Italy, Friuli-Venezia Giulia, Regional Council, and Mayors and Municipal Councils (1st round)
  - Switzerland
    - Appenzell Innerrhoden, Landsgemeinde
    - Ticino, referendum
  - Tunisia, Municipal Councils (armed forces)

== May ==
- 1 May: Canada, Nunatsiavut, Assembly
- 3 May: United Kingdom
  - Borough Councils, Unitary Authority and Mayors
    - Birmingham, City Council
    - Leeds, City Council
    - Liverpool, City Council (one third)
    - London, Mayors and Borough Councils
    - Manchester, City Council
    - Sheffield City Region, Mayor
  - West Tyrone, House of Commons by-election
- 5 May:
  - Australia, Tasmania, (Hobart and Prosser) Legislative Council
  - United States, Arlington, City Council
- 6 May:
  - Germany, Schleswig-Holstein, County Councils, Mayors and Municipal Councils
  - Switzerland
    - Geneva, Council of State (2nd round)
    - Glarus, Landsgemeinde
  - Tunisia, Municipal Councils
- 8 May: United States, Ohio, Regulate Congressional Redistricting constitutional referendum
- 9 May: Malaysia, state elections
  - Johor, Legislative Assembly
  - Kedah, Legislative Assembly
  - Kelantan, Legislative Assembly
  - Malacca, Legislative Assembly
  - Negeri Sembilan, Legislative Assembly
  - Pahang, Legislative Assembly
  - Penang, Legislative Assembly
  - Perak, Legislative Assembly
  - Perlis, Legislative Assembly
  - Sabah, Legislative Assembly
  - Selangor, Legislative Assembly
  - Terengganu, Legislative Assembly
- 12 May:
  - The Gambia, Mayors
  - India, Karnataka, Legislative Assembly
  - Kuwait, Municipal Council
  - Nigeria
    - Kaduna, Local Government Councils and Chairmen
    - Oyo, Local Government Councils and Chairmen
- 13 May: Italy, Friuli-Venezia Giulia, Mayors and Municipal Councils (2nd round)
- 14 May:
  - India, West Bengal, District Councils, Township Councils and Village Councils
  - Philippines, Ward Chairs, Ward Councils, Youth Chairs and Youth Councils
- 15 May:
  - Bangladesh, Khulna, Mayor and City Corporation
  - United States
    - Idaho, Supreme Court and Court of Appeals
    - Portland, City Commission (1st round)
- 18–19 May: Czech Republic, Zlín district 78, Senate (1st round)
- 20 May:
  - Italy, Aosta Valley, Regional Council, Mayors and Municipal Councils
  - Montenegro, Municipal Assemblies
  - Tunisia, Municipal Councils (Mdhilla only)
- 22 May: United States
  - Arkansas, Supreme Court and Court of Appeals
  - Georgia, Supreme Court and Court of Appeals
- 23 May: Solomon Islands, Gizo/Kolombangara, National Parliament by-election
- 24 May: United States, Nashville, Mayor
- 25–26 May: Czech Republic, Zlín district 78, Senate (2nd round)
- 26 May:
  - Iceland, Municipal Councils
  - Nigeria, Nasarawa, Local Government Councils and Chairmen
- 27 May:
  - Italy, Trentino-Alto Adige/Südtirol, Mayors and Municipal Councils
  - Montenegro, Municipal Assemblies
  - Podgorica, City Assembly
- 28 May: India, Bhandara–Gondiya, Kairana, Nagaland and Palghar, House of the People by-elections

== June ==
- 3 June: Brazil, Tocantins, Governor by-election (1st round)
- 5 June: United States
  - Fresno, City Council (1st round)
  - Long Beach, City Council (2nd round)
  - Los Angeles County, Board of Supervisors
  - Orange County, CA, Board of Supervisors and District Attorney (1st round)
  - Riverside County, Board of Supervisors (1st round)
  - Sacramento, City Council
  - San Bernardino County, Board of Supervisors
  - San Diego County, Board of Supervisors (1st round)
  - San Francisco, Mayor
  - Santa Clara County, Board of Supervisors (1st round)
    - San Jose, Mayor and City Council (1st round)
- 7 June:
  - Bermuda, Warwick North East, House of Assembly by-election
  - Canada, Ontario, Legislative Assembly
- 9 June: New Zealand, Northcote, House of Representatives by-election
- 10 June:
  - Armenia, Mayors, Local Councils and Community Chiefs
  - Italy, Mayors and Municipal Councils (1st round)
  - Japan, Niigata, Governor
  - Switzerland
    - Basel-Landschaft, referendums
    - Basel-Stadt, referendums
    - Fribourg, referendum
    - Geneva, referendums
    - Glarus, Landrat
    - Grisons, Executive Council and Grand Council (1st round)
    - Jura, referendums
    - Lucerne, referendums
    - Nidwalden, referendum
    - Schaffhausen, referendums
    - Schwyz, referendum
    - Solothurn, referendum
    - St. Gallen, referendums
    - Valais, referendum
    - Zug, referendum
    - Zürich, referendums
- 12 June: United States, Maine, Ranked-Choice Voting referendum
- 13 June: South Korea,
  - Busan Haeundae B, Cheonan A, Cheonan C, Gimcheon, Gimhae B, Gwangju Seo A, Incheon Namdong A, Jecheon–Danyang, Seoul Nowon C, Seoul Songpa B, Ulsan Buk and Yeongam–Muan–Sinan, National Assembly by-elections
  - Governors, Provincial Councils, Mayors, Municipal Councils and School Boards
    - Busan, Mayor
    - Incheon, Mayor
    - Seoul, Mayor
- 14 June: United Kingdom, Lewisham East, House of Commons by-election
- 16 June: Nigeria, Rivers, Local Government Councils and Chairmen
- 18 June: Canada, Chicoutimi—Le Fjord, House of Commons by-election
- 19 June: United States, Washington, D.C., Minimum Wage Parity for Tipped Workers referendum
- 24 June:
  - Armenia, Mayors, Local Councils and Community Chiefs
  - Brazil, Tocantins, Governor by-election (2nd round)
  - Italy, Mayors and Municipal Councils (2nd round)
  - Japan, Shiga, Governor
  - Northern Cyprus, Mayors, Municipal Councils, Village Heads and Village Councils
- 26 June: Bangladesh, Bagerhat-3, House of the Nation by-election
- 27 June:
  - Bangladesh, Gazipur, Mayor and City Corporation
  - Indonesia, Governors, Regents and Mayors
- 30 June:
  - Canada, Mohawk Council of Akwesasne
  - United States, Texas's 27th congressional district, U.S. House of Representatives special election

== July ==
- 1 July:
  - Mexico, State elections
    - Aguascalientes, Congress
    - Baja California Sur, Congress, Mayors and Municipal Councils
    - Campeche, Congress, Mayors and Municipal Councils
    - Chiapas, Governor, Congress, Mayors and Municipal Councils
    - Chihuahua, Congress, Mayors and Municipal Councils
    - Coahuila, Mayors and Municipal Councils
    - Colima, Congress, Mayors and Municipal Councils
    - Durango, Congress
    - Guanajuato, Governor, Congress, Mayors and Municipal Councils
    - Guerrero, Congress, Mayors and Municipal Councils
    - Hidalgo, Congress
    - Jalisco, Governor, Congress, Mayors and Municipal Councils
    - Mexico City, Head of Government, Congress, Mayors and Municipal Councils
    - Mexico State, Congress, Mayors and Municipal Councils
    - Michoacán, Congress, Mayors and Municipal Councils
    - Morelos, Governor, Congress, Mayors and Municipal Councils
    - Nuevo León, Congress, Mayors and Municipal Councils
    - Oaxaca, Congress, Mayors and Municipal Councils
    - Puebla, Governor, Congress, Mayors and Municipal Councils
    - Querétaro, Congress, Mayors and Municipal Councils
    - Quintana Roo, Mayors and Municipal Councils
    - San Luis Potosí, Congress, Mayors and Municipal Councils
    - Sinaloa, Congress, Mayors and Municipal Councils
    - Sonora, Congress, Mayors and Municipal Councils
    - Tabasco, Governor, Congress, Mayors and Municipal Councils
    - Tamaulipas, Mayors and Municipal Councils
    - Tlaxcala, Congress
    - Veracruz, Governor and Congress,
    - Yucatán, Governor, Congress, Mayors and Municipal Councils
    - Zacatecas, Congress, Mayors and Municipal Councils
  - Switzerland, Grisons, Grand Council (2nd round)
- 10 July: Uganda, County Councils and Parish Councils
- 14 July: Nigeria, Ekiti, Governor
- 25 July:
  - Bangladesh, Kurigram-3, House of the Nation by-election
  - Pakistan
    - Balochistan, Provincial Assembly
    - Khyber Pakhtunkhwa, Provincial Assembly
    - Punjab, Provincial Assembly
    - Sindh, Provincial Assembly
- 26 July: Zambia, Lusaka, Mayor
- 28 July: Australia, Braddon, Fremantle, Longman, Mayo and Perth, House of Representatives by-elections
- 30 July:
  - Bangladesh
    - Barisal, Mayor and City Corporation
    - Rajshahi, Mayor and City Corporation
    - Sylhet, Mayor and City Corporation
  - Zimbabwe, Urban Councils, District Councils and Ward Councils
- 31 July: Liberia, Bong and Montserrado, Senate by-elections

== August ==
- 5 August: Japan, Nagano, Governor
- 7 August: United States
  - Ohio's 12th congressional district, U.S. House of Representatives special election
  - Missouri, Right to Work Repeal referendum
- 11 August:
  - Nigeria
    - Katsina North and Bauchi South, Senate by-elections
    - Lokoja, House of Representatives by-election
  - United States, Honolulu, City Council (1st round)
- 15 August: Uganda, Arua, Parliament by-election
- 17 August: Kenya, Baringo South, National Assembly by-election
- 25 August: Nigeria, Imo, Local Government Councils and Chairmen
- 26 August: Japan, Kagawa, Governor
- 27 August: India, Ladakh, Kargil District, Ladakh Autonomous Hill Development Council
- 28 August: United States
  - Mesa, City Council (1st round)
  - Miami-Dade County, County Commission
  - Tulsa, City Council
- 31 August: India, Karnataka, City Corporations, Municipal Councils and Town Councils

== September ==
- 1 September: Mauritania, Regional Presidents, Regional Councils and Municipal Councils (1st round)
- 6 September: Zambia, Kasenengwa, National Assembly by-election
- 9 September:
  - Russia, State Duma by-elections, Federal Subject Heads, Federal Subject Legislatures, Municipal Heads, Municipal Councils, District Councils, Village Councils and Local referendums
    - Altai Krai, Governor
    - Amur Oblast, Governor and District 71, State Duma by-election
    - Arkhangelsk Oblast, Arkhangelsk Oblast
    - Bashkortostan, State Assembly
    - Buryatia, People's Khural
    - Chukotka Autonomous Okrug, Governor
    - Irkutsk Oblast, Legislative Assembly
    - Ivanovo Oblast, Governor and Duma
    - Kaliningrad Oblast, District 98, State Duma by-election
    - Kalmykia, People's Khural
    - Kemerovo Oblast, Governor and Council of People's Deputies
    - Khabarovsk Krai, Governor (1st round)
    - Khakassia, Head (1st round) and Supreme Council
    - Krasnoyarsk Krai, Governor
    - Magadan Oblast, Governor
    - Moscow, Mayor
    - Moscow Oblast, Governor
    - Nenets Autonomous Okrug, Assembly of Deputies
    - Nizhny Novgorod Oblast, Governor and District 129, State Duma by-election
    - Novosibirsk Oblast, Governor
    - Omsk Oblast, Governor
    - Oryol Oblast, Governor
    - Primorsky Krai, ~~Governor (1st round)~~ (election nullified)
    - Pskov Oblast, Governor
    - Rostov Oblast, Legislative Assembly
    - Samara Oblast, Governor and District 158, State Duma by-election
    - Saratov Oblast, District 163 and District 165, State Duma by-elections
    - Smolensk Oblast, Duma
    - Tver Oblast, District 180, State Duma by-election
    - Tyumen Oblast, Governor
    - Ulyanovsk Oblast, Legislative Assembly
    - Vladimir Oblast, Governor (1st round) and Legislative Assembly
    - Voronezh Oblast, Governor
    - Yakutia, Head and State Assembly
    - Yaroslavl Oblast, Duma
    - Zabaykalsky Krai, Legislative Assembly
  - Sweden, County Councils and Municipal Councils
- 15 September: Mauritania, Regional Presidents, Regional Councils and Municipal Councils (2nd round)
- 16 September:
  - Russia, Primorsky Krai, ~~Governor (2nd round)~~ (election nullified)
  - Tanzania, Korogwe, Monduli and Ukonga, National Assembly by-elections
- 19 September: India, Punjab, District Councils and Township Councils
- 22 September: Nigeria, Osun, Governor
- 23 September:
  - Armenia, Yerevan, City Council
  - France, Réunion, National Assembly by-election (1st round)
  - Russia
    - Vladimir Oblast, Governor (2nd round)
    - Khabarovsk Krai, Governor (2nd round)
  - Switzerland
    - Aargau, referendum
    - Appenzell Ausserrhoden, referendums
    - Grisons, referendum
    - Lucerne, referendums
    - Nidwalden, referendum
    - Obwalden, referendum
    - St. Gallen, referendum
    - Thurgau, referendum
    - Ticino, referendum
    - Zürich, referendums
- 24 September: Canada, New Brunswick, Legislative Assembly
- 30 September:
  - France, Réunion, National Assembly by-election (2nd round)
  - Iraq, Kurdistan Region, National Assembly
  - Japan, Okinawa, Governor

== October ==
- 1 October: Canada, Quebec, National Assembly
- 5–6 October: Czech Republic, Municipal Councils
- 6 October: Gabon, Departmental Councils and Municipal Councils
- 7 October:
  - Bosnia and Herzegovina
    - Federation of Bosnia and Herzegovina, House of Representatives and Cantonal Assemblies
    - Republika Srpska, President and National Assembly
  - Brazil, Governors (1st round) and Legislative Assemblies
  - India, Maharashtra, Village Councils (1st phase)
  - Peru, Governors, Regional Councils, Mayors and Municipal Councils
  - São Tomé and Príncipe, District Councils
    - Príncipe, Regional Assembly
  - Switzerland, Zug, Executive Council and Cantonal Council
- 8 October: India, Jammu and Kashmir, Municipal Corporations and Municipal Councils (1st phase)
- 8–30 October: Australia, Tasmania, Mayors, Deputy Mayors and Local Councils
- 10 October:
  - India, Jammu and Kashmir, Municipal Corporations and Municipal Councils (2nd phase)
  - Mozambique, Mayors and Municipal Councils
  - Nigeria, Plateau, Local Government Councils and Chairmen
- 13 October:
  - India, Jammu and Kashmir, Municipal Corporations and Municipal Councils (3rd phase)
  - Ivory Coast, Regional Councils, Mayors and Municipal Councils
  - Malaysia, Port Dickson, House of Representatives by-election
- 14 October:
  - Belgium, Provincial Councils, Municipal Councils, Social Welfare Councils and Antwerp District Councils
  - Germany, Bavaria, Parliament, Regional Assemblies
  - India, Maharashtra, Village Councils (2nd phase)
  - Pakistan, NA-35, NA-53, NA-56, NA-60, NA-63, NA-65, NA-69, NA-103, NA-124, NA-131 and NA-243, National Assembly by-elections
- 16 October: India, Jammu and Kashmir, Municipal Corporations and Municipal Councils (4th phase)
- 20 October:
  - Australia, Wentworth, House of Representatives by-election
  - Canada, British Columbia, Mayors and Municipal Councils
    - Vancouver, Mayor, Park Board, School Board and City Council
  - Jordan, Al-Muwaqqar, Governorate Council, Mayors and Municipal Councils (revote)
- 21 October:
  - Armenia, Mayors, Local Councils and Community Chiefs
  - Italy
    - South Tyrol, Provincial Council
    - Trentino, President and Provincial Council
    - Verbano-Cusio-Ossola, Region Switch referendum
  - Pakistan, NA-247, National Assembly by-election
  - Poland, Provincial Assemblies, County Councils, Commune Councils and Commune Heads (1st round)
- 22 October: Canada, Ontario, County Councils, Mayors, Regional Councils, Reeves, District Councils and School Boards
  - Toronto, Mayor, City Council and School Boards
- 22 October – 9 November: Australia, South Australia, Mayors, District Councils, Regional Councils, City Councils, Town Councils and Aboriginal Councils
- 22 October – 7 December: Canada, British Columbia, Electoral Reform referendum
- 24 October: Canada, Manitoba, Mayors, Municipal Councils and School Boards
- 28 October:
  - Brazil, Governors (2nd round)
  - Germany, Hesse, Parliament and constitutional referendum
  - Japan, Fukushima, Governor
  - Kazakhstan, Regional Councils and City Councils
- 30 October: Israel, Regional Heads, Regional Councils, Municipal Heads, Municipal Councils, Local Heads and Local Councils (1st round)

== November ==
- 3 November:
  - India, Bellary, Mandya and Shimoga, House of the People by-elections
  - Myanmar
    - Kanpetlet, Lechar, Myingyan and Tamwe, House of Representatives by-elections
    - Myitkyina, House of Nationalities by-election
- 4 November:
  - Poland, Commune Heads (2nd round)
  - Serbia, National Minorities Councils
- 5 November: Canada, Prince Edward Island, Mayors and Charlottetown City Council
- 6 November:
  - Federated States of Micronesia
    - Kosrae, Governor, Lieutenant Governor (1st round) and State Legislature
    - Yap, Governor and State Legislature
  - Northern Mariana Islands, Mayors, Municipal Councils and Boards of Education
  - United States, Midterm elections
    - Michigan's 13th congressional district, U.S. House of Representatives special election
    - Minnesota, U.S. Senate special election
    - Mississippi, U.S. Senate special election (1st round)
    - Navajo Nation, President, Board of Education, Board of Election Supervisors, Council and Referendum
    - Washington, D.C., Mayor, Attorney General and Council
    - Alabama
      - Governor, Lieutenant Governor, Attorney General, Auditor, Board of Education, Commissioner of Agriculture and Industries, Public Service Commission, Secretary of State and Treasurer
      - House of Representatives and Senate
      - Supreme Court, Court of Civil Appeals and Court of Criminal Appeals
      - Ten Commandments and Abortion constitutional referendums
    - Alaska
      - Governor
      - House of Representatives and Senate
      - Salmon Habitat Protection referendum
    - Arizona
      - Governor, Attorney General, Corporation Commission, Mine Inspector, Secretary of State, Superintendent of Public Instruction and Treasurer
      - House of Representatives and Senate
      - Supreme Court and Court of Appeals retention elections
      - Prohibit New Taxes on Services and Renewable Energy Standards constitutional referendums, and Clean Election referendum
      - Mesa, City Council (2nd round)
      - Phoenix, Mayor special election (1st round)
    - Arkansas
      - Governor, Lieutenant Governor, Attorney General, Auditor, Commissioner of State Lands, Secretary of State and Treasurer
      - House of Representatives and Senate
      - Voter ID constitutional referendum and Minimum Wage referendum
    - California
      - Governor, Lieutenant Governor, Attorney General, Board of Equalization, Controller, Insurance Commissioner, Secretary of State, Superintendent of Public Instruction and Treasurer
      - Assembly and Senate
      - Supreme Court and Court of Appeals retention elections
      - Local Rent Control and Farm Animal Confinement referendums
      - Bakersfield, City Council
      - Fresno, City Council (2nd round)
      - Oakland, Mayor and City Council
      - Orange County, Board of Supervisors and District Attorney (2nd round)
      - Riverside County, Board of Supervisors (2nd round)
      - San Diego County, Board of Supervisors (2nd round)
        - San Diego, City Council
      - San Francisco, Board of Supervisors
      - Santa Clara County, Board of Supervisors (2nd round)
        - San Jose, City Council (2nd round)
    - Colorado
      - Governor, Attorney General, Board of Education, Secretary of State and Treasurer
      - House of Representatives and Senate
      - Supreme Court and Court of Appeals retention elections
      - Independent Congressional Redistricting Commission, Independent State Legislative Redistricting Commission, Graduated Income Tax, Compensation for Property Value Loss Due to State Regulation and Campaign Contribution Limits constitutional referendums, and Payday Loan Limits and Fracking referendums
    - Connecticut
      - Governor, Attorney General, Comptroller, Secretary of the State and Treasurer
      - House of Representatives and Senate
      - Legislative Requirements to Privatize State Property constitutional referendum
    - Delaware
      - Attorney General, Auditor and Treasurer
      - House of Representatives and Senate
    - Florida
      - Governor, Attorney General, Chief Financial Officer and Commissioner of Agriculture
      - House of Representatives and Senate
      - Supreme Court and District Courts of Appeal retention elections
      - Two-Thirds Vote of Legislature to Increase Taxes constitutional referendum, and Prohibit Courts from Deferring to Administrative Agency Interpretations and Ban Offshore Drilling referendums
      - Broward County, Commission
    - Georgia
      - Governor, Lieutenant Governor, Attorney General, Commissioner of Agriculture, Commissioner of Insurance, Commissioner of Labor, Public Service Commission, Secretary of State and Superintendent of Schools
      - House of Representatives and Senate
    - Hawaii
      - Governor and Office of Hawaiian Affairs Board of Trustees
      - House of Representatives and Senate
      - Constitutional Convention referendum
      - Honolulu, City Council (2nd round)
    - Idaho
      - Governor, Lieutenant Governor, Attorney General, Controller, Secretary of State, Treasurer and Superintendent of Public Instruction
      - House of Representatives and Senate
      - Medicaid Expansion referendum
    - Illinois
      - Governor, Attorney General, Comptroller, Secretary of State and Treasurer
      - House of Representatives and Senate
      - Supreme Court and Appellate Court retention elections, and Appellate Court
      - Cook County, Assessor, Board of Commissioners, Board of Commissioners President, Board of Review, Clerk, Sheriff, Treasurer, Water Reclamation District Board, and $13 Minimum Wage, Earned Sick Time and Gun Dealer Penalties referendums
        - Chicago, Plastic Straws Ban referendum
    - Indiana
      - Auditor, Secretary of State and Treasurer
      - House of Representatives and Senate
      - Supreme Court and Court of Appeals retention elections
      - Require Balanced Budget constitutional referendum
    - Iowa
      - Governor, Attorney General, Auditor, Secretary of Agriculture, Secretary of State and Treasurer
      - House of Representatives and Senate
      - Court of Appeals retention elections
    - Kansas
      - Governor, Attorney General, Board of Education, Commissioner of Insurance, Secretary of State and Treasurer
      - House of Representatives
      - Court of Appeals retention elections
    - Kentucky
      - House of Representatives and Senate
      - Supreme Court and Court of Appeals
      - Louisville, Mayor and Metropolitan Council
    - Louisiana
      - Public Service Commission and Secretary of State
      - Supreme Court and Circuit Courts of Appeal
      - Unanimous Jury Verdict constitutional referendum
    - Maine
      - Governor
      - House of Representatives and Senate
    - Maryland
      - Governor, Attorney General and Comptroller
      - House of Delegates and Senate
      - Court of Appeals and Court of Special Appeals retention elections
      - Election-Day Voter Registration constitutional referendum
    - Massachusetts
      - Governor, Attorney General, Auditor, Governor's Council, Secretary of the Commonwealth and Treasurer
      - House of Representatives and Senate
      - Advisory Commission for Amendments to the U.S. Constitution Regarding Corporate Personhood and Political Spending, Gender Identity Anti-Discrimination and Nurse-Patient Assignment Limits referendums
    - Michigan
      - Governor, Attorney General, Board of Education and Secretary of State
      - House of Representatives and Senate
      - Supreme Court and Court of Appeals
      - Independent Redistricting Commission and Voting Policies constitutional referendums, and Marijuana Legalization referendum
      - Wayne County, Executive and Commission
    - Minnesota
      - Governor, Attorney General, Auditor and Secretary of State
      - House of Representatives
      - Supreme Court and Court of Appeals
    - Mississippi
      - Supreme Court and Court of Appeals
      - Lobbying, Campaign Finance, and Redistricting constitutional referendum
    - Missouri
      - Auditor
      - House of Representatives and Senate
      - Supreme Court and Court of Appeals retention elections
      - Medical Marijuana constitutional referendums, and Medical Marijuana and Minimum Wage referendums
    - Montana
      - Public Service Commission
      - House of Representatives and Senate
      - Supreme Court
      - Medicaid Expansion and New Mine Requirements referendums
    - Nebraska
      - Governor, Attorney General, Auditor, Board of Education, Public Service Commission, Secretary of State and Treasurer
      - Legislature
      - Medicaid Expansion referendum
    - Nevada
      - Governor, Lieutenant Governor, Attorney General, Controller, Secretary of State and Treasurer
      - Assembly and Senate
      - Supreme Court
      - Energy Market and Renewable Energy Standards constitutional referendums, and Automatic DMV Voter Registration referendum
      - Clark County, County Commission
    - New Hampshire
      - Governor and Executive Council
      - House of Representatives and Senate
      - Taxpayer Right to Legal Action Against Government and Right to Privacy constitutional referendums
    - New Mexico
      - Governor, Attorney General, Auditor, Commissioner of Public Lands, Public Education Commission, Public Regulation Commission, Secretary of State and Treasurer
      - House of Representatives
      - Court of Appeals retention election, and Supreme Court and Court of Appeals
      - Legislature Regulation of Judicial Appeal Process constitutional referendum
    - New York
      - Governor, Attorney General and Comptroller
      - Assembly and Senate
    - North Carolina
      - House of Representatives and Senate
      - Supreme Court and Court of Appeals
      - Eliminate Gubernatorial Appoints to Elections Board and Voter ID constitutional referendums
    - North Dakota
      - Agriculture Commissioner, Attorney General, Public Service Commission, Secretary of State and Tax Commissioner
      - House of Representatives and Senate
      - Supreme Court
      - Electoral Campaign Regulations and Only Citizens Can Vote constitutional referendums, and Marijuana Legalization referendum
    - Ohio
      - Governor, Attorney General, Auditor, Board of Education, Secretary of State and Treasurer
      - House of Representatives and Senate
      - Supreme Court and District Courts of Appeals
      - Drug Crime Policies constitutional referendums
    - Oklahoma
      - Governor, Lieutenant Governor, Attorney General, Auditor, Corporation Commissioner, Commissioner of Insurance, Commissioner of Labor, Superintendent of Public Instruction and Treasurer
      - House of Representatives and Senate
      - Supreme Court, Court of Criminal Appeals and Court of Civil Appeals retention elections
      - Eliminate Lieutenant Governor Elections constitutional referendum, and Medical Marijuana referendum
    - Oregon
      - Governor and Commissioner of Labor
      - House of Representatives and Senate
      - Supreme Court and Court of Appeals
      - Ban Public Funds for Abortions and Remove Affordable Housing Funding Restrictions constitutional referendums, and Repeal Limits on Local Law Enforcement Cooperation with ICE referendum
      - Portland, City Commission (2nd round)
    - Pennsylvania
      - Governor
      - House of Representatives and Senate
    - Rhode Island
      - Governor, Lieutenant Governor, Attorney General, Secretary of State and Treasurer
      - House of Representatives and Senate
    - South Carolina
      - Governor, Attorney general, Commissioner of Agriculture, Comptroller, Secretary of state, Superintendent of Education and Treasurer
      - House of Representatives
      - Appointed Superintendent of Education constitutional referendum
    - South Dakota
      - Governor, Attorney General, Auditor, Commissioner of Public Lands, Public Utilities Commission, Secretary of State and Treasurer
      - House of Representatives and Senate
      - Supreme Court retention election
      - Election Policies and 55% Supermajority for Amendments constitutional referendums
    - Tennessee
      - Governor
      - House of Representatives and Senate
    - Texas
      - Governor, Lieutenant Governor, Attorney General, Board of Education, Commissioner of Agriculture, Commissioner of the General Land Office, Comptroller and Railroad Commissioner
      - House of Representatives and Senate
      - Supreme Court, Court of Criminal Appeals and Courts of Appeals
      - Austin, Mayor and City Council (1st round)
      - Bexar County, Commissioners Court
      - Dallas County, Commissioners Court
      - Harris County, Commissioners Court
      - Tarrant County, Commissioners Court
    - Utah
      - Board of Education
      - House of Representatives and Senate
      - Supreme Court and Court of Appeals retention elections
      - Independent Redistricting Commission, Medicaid Expansion and Medical Marijuana referendums
    - Vermont
      - Governor, Lieutenant Governor, Attorney General, Auditor, Secretary of State and Treasurer
      - House of Representatives and Senate
    - Virginia
      - Virginia Beach, Mayor special election and City Council
    - Washington
      - House of Representatives and Senate
      - Supreme Court and Court of Appeals
      - Gun Restrictions and Police Liability referendums
    - West Virginia
      - House of Delegates and Senate
      - Abortion constitutional referendum
    - Wisconsin
      - Governor, Attorney General, Secretary of State and Treasurer
      - Assembly and Senate
    - Wyoming
      - Governor, Auditor, Secretary of State, Superintendent of Public Instruction and Treasurer
      - House of Representatives and Senate
    - American Samoa, House of Representatives and Constitutional Referendum
    - Guam, Governor, Attorney General, Auditor, Consolidated Commission on Utilities, Education Board, Legislature, and Supreme Court and Superior Court retention elections
    - U.S. Virgin Islands, Governor (1st round), Board of Education, Board of Elections and Legislature
- 7 November: Canada, Nunavik, Kativik Regional Government Council
- 10 November: Slovakia, City Mayors, City Councils, Municipal Mayors and Municipal Councils
- 11 November: Russia, Khakassia, Head (2nd round)
- 12 November: India, Chhattisgarh, Legislative Assembly (1st phase)
- 13 November:
  - Canada, Calgary, 2026 Olympics Bid referendum
  - Israel, Regional Heads, Municipal Heads and Local Heads (2nd round)
  - Northern Mariana Islands, Governor, Attorney General, House of Representatives, Senate, and Supreme Court retention elections
- 17 November: India, Jammu and Kashmir, Block Development Councils and Village Councils (1st phase)
- 18 November:
  - France, Essonne, National Assembly by-election (1st round)
  - India, Uttarakhand, Mayors, Municipal Corporations, Municipal Chairs, Municipal Councils, Town Chairs and Town Councils
    - Dehradun, Mayor and Municipal Corporation
  - Japan, Ehime, Governor
  - Slovenia, Mayors (1st round) and Municipal Councils
- 20 November:
  - India
    - Chhattisgarh, Legislative Assembly (2nd phase)
    - India, Jammu and Kashmir, Block Development Councils and Village Councils (2nd phase)
  - Liberia, Montserrado District 13, House of Representatives by-election
  - Tuvalu, Funafuti, Parliament by-election
  - U.S. Virgin Islands, Governor (2nd round)
  - Zambia, Mangango, National Assembly by-election
- 24 November:
  - Australia, Victoria, Legislative Assembly and Legislative Council
  - Bahrain, Municipal Councils (1st round)
  - India, Jammu and Kashmir, Block Development Councils and Village Councils (3rd phase)
  - Taiwan, County Magistrates, County Councils, Township Mayors, Township Councils, Municipal Mayors, Municipal Councils, Borough Chiefs, Indigenous District Chiefs and Indigenous District Councillors
  - Zimbabwe, Mutoko North, House of Assembly by-election
- 25 November:
  - France, Essonne, National Assembly by-election (2nd round)
  - Hong Kong, Kowloon West, Legislative Council by-election
  - Japan, Wakayama, Governor
  - Mexico, Chiapas, Mayors and Municipal Councils special election
  - Switzerland
    - Aargau, referendums
    - Basel-Landschaft, referendums
    - Basel-Stadt, referendums
    - Bern, referendums
    - Grisons, referendums
    - St. Gallen, referendums
    - Uri, referendums
- 27 November:
  - India, Jammu and Kashmir, Block Development Councils and Village Councils (4th phase)
  - United States, Mississippi, U.S. Senate special election (2nd round)
- 28 November: India
  - Madhya Pradesh, Legislative Assembly
  - Mizoram, Legislative Assembly
- 29 November: India, Jammu and Kashmir, Block Development Councils and Village Councils (5th phase)

== December ==
- 1 December:
  - Bahrain, Municipal Councils (2nd round)
  - Guernsey, Alderney, Parliament
  - India, Jammu and Kashmir, Block Development Councils and Village Councils (6th phase)
- 2 December:
  - Slovenia, Mayors (2nd round)
  - Spain, Andalusia, Parliament
- 3 December: Canada, Leeds—Grenville—Thousand Islands and Rideau Lakes, House of Commons by-election
- 4 December: India, Jammu and Kashmir, Block Development Councils and Village Councils (7th phase)
- 5 December: India, Assam, District Councils, Township Councils and Village Councils (1st phase)
- 7 December: India
  - Rajasthan, Legislative Assembly
  - Telangana, Legislative Assembly
- 8 December: India, Jammu and Kashmir, Block Development Councils and Village Councils (8th phase)
- 9 December:
  - India, Assam, District Councils, Township Councils and Village Councils (2nd phase)
  - Japan, Ibaraki, Prefectural Assembly
  - Venezuela, Municipal Councils
- 11 December:
  - India, Jammu and Kashmir, Block Development Councils and Village Councils (9th phase)
  - United States, Austin, City Council (2nd round)
- 12 December: Guernsey, Sark, Parliament
- 16 December:
  - India, Haryana, Municipal Corporations and Municipal Councils
  - Ivory Coast, Regional Councils and Municipal Councils by-elections
  - Japan, Saga, Governor
  - Russia, Primorsky Krai, Governor (revote)
- 23 December:
  - Japan, Miyazaki, Governor
  - Mexico, Nuevo León, Mayor and Municipal Council
- 27 December: Ghana, New Regions referendums
- 30 December:
  - Democratic Republic of the Congo, Provincial Assemblies
  - India, Punjab, Village Heads and Village Councils

== See also ==
- 2018 United States ballot measures
