= 2018 Oregon elections =

Oregon's 2018 general election was held on November 6, with primaries on May 15

- November 6, 2018

A general election was held in the U.S. state of Oregon on November 6, 2018. Primary elections were held on May 15, 2018.

== United States House of Representatives ==
All five of Oregon's seats in the United States House of Representatives were up for re-election in 2018. All five incumbents, four Democrats and one Republican, won re-election.

== Governor ==
Incumbent Democratic governor Kate Brown was originally elevated to the role in February 2015 upon the resignation of her predecessor, Governor John Kitzhaber. Then serving as the Oregon Secretary of State, Brown was first in the line of succession to replace the Kitzhaber. Brown won a special election the following year to serve the final two years of Kitzhaber's four-year term. Brown won re-election to her first full term in this election. Brown was challenged by Republican Knute Buehler, representative of Oregon's 54th House district, and several third-party candidates.

== Commissioner of Labor ==
Results by county Hoyle: 40–50%; 50–60%; 60–70%; 70–80%; Ogden: 30–40%; 40–50%; 50–60%

Incumbent Brad Avakian elected not to seek re-election to the office of Oregon Commissioner of Labor. A nonpartisan primary election was held alongside partisan primary elections on May 15, 2018. Three candidates appeared on the primary election ballot:

- Jack Howard, Union County Commissioner
- Val Hoyle, former Majority Leader of the Oregon House of Representatives and Representative for Oregon's 14th House district
- Lou Ogden, mayor of Tualatin

Since the Commissioner of Labor is a nonpartisan role, a general election is only held if no one in the primary election secures 50% of the vote. Hoyle avoided a runoff vote and was elected to the role by winning 52.28% of the vote in the primary election.

Oregon Commissioner of Labor (primary election results)
Party	Candidate	Votes	%
Nonpartisan	Val Hoyle	375,762	52.28
Nonpartisan	Lou Ogden	253,977	35.34
Nonpartisan	Jack Howard	86,477	12.03
	Write-ins	2,520	0.35
Total votes		718,736	100.00

== Legislative ==
Of the 30 seats in the Oregon State Senate, 17 were up for election (15 regular elections and two special elections). All 60 seats in the Oregon House of Representatives were up for election. As a result of the election, the Democratic Party expanded its advantage over the Republican Party and held a supermajority in both chambers. Democrats had an 18–12 majority in the Senate and a 38–22 majority in the House of Representatives.

== Ballot measures ==
There were five statewide Oregon ballot measures on the general election ballot. As a result of the election, one ballot measure passed while the other four failed.

Measure	Description	Votes	
Measure	Description	Yes	No
Measure 102	Amends Constitution: Allows local bonds for financing affordable housing with nongovernmental entities. Requires voter approval, annual audits	1,037,922 (56.90%)	786,225 (43.10%)
Measure 103	Amends Constitution: Prohibits taxes/fees based on transactions for "groceries" (defined) enacted or amended after September 2017	791,687 (42.69%)	1,062,752 (57.31%)
Measure 104	Amends Constitution: Expands (beyond taxes) application of requirement that three-fifths legislative majority approve bills raising revenue	631,211 (34.81%)	1,182,023 (65.19%)
Measure 105	Repeals law limiting use of state/local law enforcement resources to enforce federal immigration laws	675,389 (36.54%)	1,172,774 (63.46%)
Measure 106	Amends Constitution: Prohibits spending "public funds" (defined) directly/indirectly for "abortion" (defined); exceptions; reduces abortion access	658,793 (35.52%)	1,195,718 (64.48%)
