= Ohio Issue 2 =

Ohio Issue 2 can refer to several ballot measures:

- 1990 Cuyahoga County Issue 2, a successful ballot measure to fund the Gateway Sports and Entertainment Complex
- 2011 Ohio Issue 2, a successful ballot measure to repeal a law that limited collective bargaining for public employees in the state
- 2017 Ohio Issue 2, an unsuccessful ballot measure to lower prescription drug prices
- 2022 Ohio Issue 2, a successful ballot measure to prohibit local governments from allowing noncitizens to vote in local elections.
- 2023 Ohio Issue 2, a successful ballot measure to legalize cannabis for recreational use.
- 2025 Ohio Issue 2, a future ballot measure also known as the "Local Public Infrastructure Bond Amendment"
