= 2022 Yamaguchi gubernatorial election =

Japanese gubernatorial election

- 6 February 2022
- Turnout: 34.91 ▼1.58
		JCP
Candidate	Tsugumasa Muraoka	Mari Chiba
Party	LDP	JCP
Popular vote	340,503	50,566
Percentage	87.07%	12.93%
Governor before election
Tsugumasa Muraoka
LDP
Elected Governor
Tsugumasa Muraoka
LDP

The 2022 Yamaguchi gubernatorial election was held on 6 February 2022 to elect the next governor of Yamaguchi (山口県, Yamaguchi-ken), a prefecture of Japan in the Chūgoku region of the main island of Honshu.

== Candidates ==
- Tsugumasa Muraoka, incumbent, endorsed by LDP and Komeito.
- Mari Chiba, women's rights activist, endorsed by JCP and SDP.

== Results ==
Yamaguchi gubernatorial 2022
Party	Candidate	Votes	%	±%
LDP	Tsugumasa Muraoka *	340,503	87.07	▲4.85
JCP	Mari Chiba	50,566	12.93	▼4.85
Turnout		394,630	34.91	▼1.58
Registered electors		1,130,290		
LDP hold		Swing		
