= List of Ohio ballot measures =

The following is a list of statewide initiatives and referendums modifying state law and proposing state constitutional amendments in Ohio, sorted by election.

== Before 1910 ==
=== 1867 ===
Measure name	Description	Status	Yes votes	No votes
Amendment 1	A constitutional amendment denying the right to vote to draft dodgers, deserters, and people who engaged in insurrection or rebellion against the US government and repealing the provision limiting voting rights to whites.	Failed	216,987 (45.94%)	255,340 (54.06%)

=== 1883 ===
Measure name	Description	Status	Yes votes	No votes
Amendment 1	A constitutional amendment replacing district courts with circuit courts and reorganizing the Supreme Court.	Passed	400,919 (73.53%)	144,335 (26.47%)
Amendment 2	A constitutional amendment allowing the general assembly to tax and regulate the traffic of intoxicating liquors.	Failed	99,238 (25.59%)	288,605 (74.41%)
Amendment 3	A constitutional amendment prohibiting the manufacture of and traffic in intoxicating liquors to be used as a beverage.	Failed (Note: A majority of the total 721,310 votes cast in the election (360,656) were needed for the amendment to pass.)	323,129 (58.78%)	226,595 (41.22%)

=== 1903 ===
Measure name	Description	Status	Yes votes	No votes
Governor's Veto Amendment	A constitutional amendment giving veto power to the governor.	Passed	458,681 (57.55%)	338,317 (42.45%)

== 1910s ==
=== 1910 ===
Measure name	Description	Status	Yes votes	No votes
Constitutional Convention Question	A measure calling for a constitutional convention.	Passed	693,263 (91.10%)	67,718 (8.90%)

=== 1912 ===
Measure name	Description	Status	Yes votes	No votes
Abolition of Capital Punishment Amendment	A constitutional amendment abolishing the death penalty.	Failed	258,706 (46.04%)	303,246 (53.96%)
Municipal Home Rule Amendment	A constitutional amendment allowing for municipal home rule.	Passed	301,861 (58.39%)	215,120 (41.61%)
Limiting Veto Power of Governor Amendment	A constitutional amendment lowering the threshold for overriding the governor's veto from a 2/3 vote to a 3/5 vote of all members in each house.	Passed	282,412 (52.63%)	254,186 (47.37%)
Initiative and Referendum Amendment	A constitutional amendment creating the initiative and referendum process.	Passed	312,592 (57.47%)	231,312 (42.53%)
Methods of Submitting Amendments to the Constitution Amendment	A constitutional amendment requiring constitutional amendments to receive a simple majority of votes to pass rather than a majority of the total votes cast in the election.	Passed	271,827 (52.42%)	246,687 (47.58%)
Voter Qualifications Amendment	A constitutional amendment removing the word "white" from voter qualifications.	Failed	242,735 (47.74%)	265,693 (52.26%)
Women's Suffrage Amendment	A constitutional amendment granting women the right to vote.	Failed	249,420 (42.54%)	336,875 (57.46%)
Eligibility of Women to Certain Offices Amendment	A constitutional amendment allowing women to hold certain offices.	Failed	261,806 (47.93%)	284,370 (52.07%)

=== 1914 ===
Measure name	Description	Status	Yes votes	No votes
Alcohol Prohibition Amendment	An initiated constitutional amendment prohibiting the manufacture, importation, and sale of alcoholic beverages.	Failed	504,177 (46.15%)	588,329 (53.85%)
Women's Suffrage Amendment	An initiated constitutional amendment granting women the right to vote.	Failed	335,390 (39.29%)	518,295 (60.71%)

=== 1915 ===
Measure name	Description	Status	Yes votes	No votes
Alcohol Prohibition Amendment	An initiated constitutional amendment prohibiting the manufacture and sale of alcoholic beverages.	Failed	484,969 (47.30%)	540,377 (52.70%)

=== 1917 ===
Measure name	Description	Status	Yes votes	No votes
Alcohol Prohibition Amendment	An initiated constitutional amendment prohibiting the manufacture and sale of alcoholic beverages.	Failed	522,590 (47.04%)	588,382 (52.96%)
Women's Suffrage in Presidential Elections Referendum	A referendum granting women the right to vote in presidential elections.	Failed	422,282 (42.63%)	568,382 (57.37%)

=== 1918 ===
Measure name	Description	Status	Yes votes	No votes
Alcohol Prohibition Amendment	An initiated constitutional amendment prohibiting the manufacture and sale of alcoholic beverages.	Passed	463,354 (51.41%)	437,895 (48.59%)
Veto Referendums on Legislative Ratification of Federal Constitutional Amendments Amendment	An initiated constitutional amendment allowing veto referendums on the state legislature's ratification of federal constitutional amendments.	Passed (Note: Overturned in 1920 by Hawke v. Smith)	508,282 (61.74%)	315,030 (38.26%)

=== 1919 ===
Measure name	Description	Status	Yes votes	No votes
Repeal Alcohol Prohibition Amendment	An initiated constitutional amendment repealing the prohibition of alcohol.	Failed	454,933 (47.80%)	496,876 (52.20%)
Definition of Intoxicating Liquor Amendment	An initiated constitutional amendment excluding beverages with 2.75% or less alcohol by weight from the definition of intoxicating liquor.	Failed	474,907 (48.48%)	504,688 (51.52%)
Alcohol Prohibition Referendum	A referendum establishing the prohibition of alcohol.	Failed	474,078 (48.63%)	500,812 (51.37%)
Ratification of 18th Amendment Referendum	A referendum upholding the state's ratification of the 18th Amendment to the US Constitution, which established federal prohibition of alcohol.	Failed	499,971 (49.98%)	500,450 (50.02%)

== 1920s ==
=== 1920 ===
Measure name	Description	Status	Yes votes	No votes
Alcohol Prohibition Referendum	A referendum establishing the prohibition of alcohol.	Passed	1,062,470 (57.91%)	772,329 (42.09%)

=== 1921 ===
Measure name	Description	Status	Yes votes	No votes
Veteran's Bonuses Amendment	A constitutional amendment allowing the state to issue bonds to pay World War I veterans $10 for each month of their service.	Passed	949,109 (74.52%)	324,447 (25.48%)
Senate Redistricting Amendment	A constitutional amendment reapportioning the Ohio Senate into 26 districts.	Failed	336,574 (39.36%)	518,524 (60.64%)
Poll Tax Amendment	A constitutional amendment allowing the legislature to establish a poll tax.	Failed	244,509 (26.66%)	672,581 (73.34%)

=== 1922 ===
Measure name	Description	Status	Yes votes	No votes
Permit Low-Alcohol Beverages Amendment	An initiated constitutional amendment legalizing the manufacture and sale of beverages with less than 2.75% or less alcohol by weight for home consumption and legalizing the possession of intoxicating liquors at home for personal use.	Failed	719,050 (44.18%)	908,522 (55.82%)
Debt Limits Amendment	An initiated constitutional amendment establishing debt limits for political subdivisions.	Failed	499,203 (41.93%)	691,471 (58.07%)
Tax Limitations Amendment	An initiated constitutional amendment limiting tax rates to 15 mills unless a higher rate is approved by voters.	Failed	475,740 (39.78%)	720,237 (60.22%)

=== 1923 ===
Measure name	Description	Status	Yes votes	No votes
Industrial Commission Authority Amendment	A constitutional amendment expanding the power of the Industrial Commission.	Passed	588,851 (52.70%)	528,572 (47.30%)
Voter Qualifications Amendment	A constitutional amendment removing the phrase "white male" from voter qualifications.	Passed	536,762 (56.00%)	421,744 (44.00%)
Publication of Ballot Measures Amendment	A constitutional amendment authorizing the state to publish copies of ballot measures in newspapers instead of distributing copies to voters.	Failed	351,513 (41.58%)	493,786 (58.42%)
Pension Initiative	An initiative establishing an old age pension.	Failed	390,599 (33.44%)	777,351 (66.56%)
Property Tax Assessment Referendum	A referendum establishing the county as the unit for property tax assessment and abolishing the office of township assessor.	Failed	231,152 (23.20%)	765,163 (76.80%)
Taxes, Bonds, and Local Budgets Referendum	A referendum amending laws relating to taxes and the issuance of bonds and creating a local budget system.	Failed	367,277 (33.53%)	728,087 (66.47%)

=== 1925 ===
Measure name	Description	Status	Yes votes	No votes
Debt Restrictions Amendment	A constitutional amendment placing debt restrictions on political subdivisions.	Failed	450,218 (45.69%)	535,251 (54.31%)
Property Taxes Amendment	A constitutional amendment establishing uniform rules for the taxation of real estate and tangible property and providing for the taxation of intangible property.	Failed	435,944 (46.52%)	501,221 (53.48%)
Tax Limitations Amendment	A constitutional amendment establishing 4-year terms for state and county officers.	Failed	325,451 (37.47%)	543,183 (62.53%)

=== 1926 ===
==== August 1926 ====
Measure name	Description	Status	Yes votes	No votes
Local Property Assessment Amendment	A constitutional amendment allowing municipalities to levy assessments on properties benefiting from public improvements for 100% of the project's cost instead of 50% of the cost.	Failed	234,754 (39.99%)	352,301 (60.01%)

==== November 1926 ====
Measure name	Description	Status	Yes votes	No votes
Elimination of Compulsory Primaries Amendment	An initiated constitutional amendment eliminating compulsory primary elections.	Failed	405,152 (35.28%)	743,313 (64.72%)

=== 1927 ===
Measure name	Description	Status	Yes votes	No votes
Board of Chiropractic Examiners Initiative	An initiative establishing a state board of chiropractic examiners.	Failed	522,612 (40.58%)	765,093 (59.42%)
Fees of Justices of the Peace and Constables Referendum	A referendum establishing fees of Justices of the Peace and Constables.	Failed	438,458 (32.37%)	916,016 (67.63%)

=== 1928 ===
Measure name	Description	Status	Yes votes	No votes
Judicial Compensation Amendment	An initiated constitutional amendment applying changes to judicial compensation regardless of if a judge is already holding office.	Failed	704,248 (37.04%)	1,197,324 (62.96%)

=== 1929 ===
Measure name	Description	Status	Yes votes	No votes
Property Tax Limit Amendment	A constitutional amendment authorizing property to be classified for tax purposes and limiting property tax rates to 15 mills.	Passed	710,538 (58.17%)	510,874 (41.83%)

== 1980s ==
=== 1980 ===
==== June 1980 ====
Measure name	Description	Status	Yes votes	No votes
Issue 1	A constitutional amendment allowing non-profit organizations to become political subdivisions of the state for the purpose of operating electric utilities.	Failed	793,256 (41.36%)	1,124,596 (58.64%)
Issue 2	A constitutional amendment allowing the state and local governments to borrow money to construct low-income housing.	Failed	797,020 (41.21%)	1,137,028 (58.79%)
Issue 3	A constitutional amendment authorizing the issuance of bonds for transportation projects.	Failed	815,011 (42.91%)	1,084,438 (57.09%)
Issue 4	A constitutional amendment requiring copies of proposed municipal or county charters or amendments to charters to each household with a registered voter and allowing the legislature to provide other means for publicizing proposed charters.	Failed	868,199 (47.59%)	956,204 (52.41%)

==== November 1980 ====
Measure name	Description	Status	Yes votes	No votes
Issue 1	A constitutional amendment allowing the general assembly to classify real property for tax purposes.	Passed	1,973,344 (52.98%)	1,751,277 (47.02%)
Issue 2	An initiative changing state taxes on income, real state, corporations, and personal property.	Failed	880,671 (22.69%)	3,000,028 (77.31%)

=== 1981 ===
Measure name	Description	Status	Yes votes	No votes
Issue 1	An initiated constitutional amendment allowing private insurance companies to sell worker's compensation insurance coverage.	Failed	572,227 (20.91%)	2,164,395 (79.09%)
Issue 2	An initiated constitutional amendment changing the methods for establishing congressional and state legislative districts.	Failed	1,093,485 (41.94%)	1,513,502 (58.06%)

=== 1982 ===
Measure name	Description	Status	Yes votes	No votes
Issue 1	A constitutional amendment allowing the state to issue revenue bonds to make financing available for low-cost housing.	Passed	1,827,453 (57.40%)	1,356,336 (42.60%)
Issue 2	A constitutional amendment authorizing the construction of a high-speed rail system and levying a 1% sales tax to fund it.	Failed	708,605 (22.64%)	2,420,593 (77.36%)
Issue 3	An initiated constitutional amendment providing for the elections of members of the Public Utilities Commission and providing public financing for their campaigns.	Failed	1,053,274 (32.62%)	2,175,893 (67.38%)

=== 1983 ===
Measure name	Description	Status	Yes votes	No votes
Issue 1	An initiated constitutional amendment raising the minimum age for alcohol possession and consumption to 21 years old.	Failed	1,386,959 (41.37%)	1,965,469 (58.63%)
Issue 2	An initiated constitutional amendment requiring a 3/5ths supermajority in the general assembly to increase taxes.	Failed	1,354,320 (40.77%)	1,967,129 (59.23%)
Issue 3	An initiated constitutional amendment repealing all taxes passed since 1982.	Failed	1,452,061 (43.54%)	1,883,270 (56.46%)

=== 1985 ===
Measure name	Description	Status	Yes votes	No votes
Issue 1	A constitutional amendment authorizing the issuance of bonds to fund coal research and development.	Passed	1,439,344 (64.06%)	807,647 (35.94%)

=== 1987 ===
Measure name	Description	Status	Yes votes	No votes
Issue 1	A constitutional amendment requiring all net proceeds of the state lotteries to be used exclusively for funding education.	Passed	1,984,905 (77.86%)	564,421 (22.14%)
Issue 2	A constitutional amendment authorizing the issuance of up to $1.2 billion in bonds to fund public infrastructure projects.	Passed	1,674,913 (70.84%)	689,383 (29.16%)
Issue 3	An initiated constitutional amendment abolishing direct elections for Ohio Supreme Court and appeals court judges and replacing it with an appointment system.	Failed	878,683 (35.44%)	1,600,588 (64.56%)

=== 1989 ===
Measure name	Description	Status	Yes votes	No votes
Issue 1	A constitutional amendment allowing the governor to nominate a lieutenant governor in case of a vacancy, who would take office after a majority vote from both houses of the General Assembly.	Passed	1,641,719 (65.28%)	873,114 (34.72%)

== 1990s ==
=== 1990 ===
Measure name	Description	Status	Yes votes	No votes
Issue 1	A constitutional amendment allowing the state to provide funding for housing assistance.	Passed	1,705,528 (52.92%)	1,517,466 (47.08%)
Issue 2	A constitutional amendment allowing spouses of people receiving a homestead tax exemption to continue receiving it after their spouse's death.	Passed	2,967,935 (88.84%)	372,950 (11.16%)
Issue 3	An initiated constitutional amendment authorizing the licensing of a casino in Lorain.	Failed	1,270,387 (37.71%)	2,098,725 (62.29%)

=== 1992 ===
Measure name	Description	Status	Yes votes	No votes
Constitutional Convention Question	A measure calling for a constitutional convention.	Failed	1,672,373 (38.60%)	2,660,270 (61.40%)
Issue 2	An initiated constitutional amendment limiting US Senators to two consecutive terms and Representatives to four consecutive terms.	Passed (Note: Overturned in 1995 by U.S. Term Limits, Inc. v. Thornton)	2,897,123 (66.24%)	1,476,461 (33.76%)
Issue 3	An initiated constitutional amendment establishing term limits for state legislators.	Passed	2,982,285 (68.40%)	1,378,009 (31.60%)
Issue 4	An initiated constitutional amendment limiting certain executive officials to two successive four-year terms.	Passed	3,028,288 (69.18%)	1,349,244 (30.82%)
Toxic Chemicals Regulation Initiative	An initiative requiring warning labels for chemicals that cause cancer or reproductive harm and imposing taxes on the release or transfer of toxic chemicals.	Failed	1,007,882 (21.93%)	3,587,734 (78.07%)

=== 1993 ===
Measure name	Description	Status	Yes votes	No votes
Issue 1	A constitutional amendment authorizing the issuance of bonds to improve parks, recreation areas, and natural resources.	Passed	1,547,841 (60.56%)	1,008,172 (39.44%)

=== 1994 ===
Measure name	Description	Status	Yes votes	No votes
Issue 1	A constitutional amendment granting the state Supreme Court direct review of death penalty cases.	Passed	2,199,791 (70.14%)	936,323 (29.86%)
Issue 2	A constitutional amendment requiring victims of crime to be afforded certain rights.	Passed	2,447,260 (77.64%)	704,650 (22.36%)
Issue 3	A constitutional amendment authorizing the sale of tuition credits to Ohio residents.	Passed	1,816,087 (60.39%)	1,191,116 (39.61%)
Issue 4	An initiated constitutional amendment prohibiting taxes on carbonated beverages.	Passed	2,228,874 (66.42%)	1,126,728 (33.58%)

=== 1995 ===
Measure name	Description	Status	Yes votes	No votes
Issue 1	A constitutional amendment limiting the governor's authority to reduce criminal sentences.	Passed	1,816,213 (70.98%)	742,590 (29.02%)
Issue 2	A constitutional amendment allowing the state to issue $2.4 billion in general obligation bonds for public infrastructure projects.	Passed	1,408,834 (61.94%)	865,698 (38.06%)

=== 1996 ===
Measure name	Description	Status	Yes votes	No votes
Issue 1	An initiated constitutional amendment authorizing riverboat casino gambling.	Failed	1,639,955 (38.15%)	2,659,075 (61.85%)

=== 1997 ===
Measure name	Description	Status	Yes votes	No votes
Issue 1	A constitutional amendment allowing courts to deny bail to a person charged with a felony offense in certain circumstances.	Passed	2,168,949 (72.96%)	803,658 (27.04%)
Amend Worker's Compensation Law Referendum	A referendum amending Workers' Compensation laws.	Failed	1,305,040 (42.99%)	1,730,502 (57.01%)

=== 1998 ===
==== May 1998 ====
Measure name	Description	Status	Yes votes	No votes
Bonds for Public Schools and Higher Education Institutions Amendment	A constitutional amendment authorizing the issuance of bonds to finance the facilities of public educational institutions.	Failed	708,439 (39.31%)	1,093,570 (60.69%)
Sales Tax Increase for Public Schools and Homestead Tax Changes Measure	A measure increasing the sales tax by 1% to fund public schools and provide property tax relief.	Failed	383,913 (20.08%)	1,527,536 (79.92%)

==== November 1998 ====
Measure name	Description	Status	Yes votes	No votes
Issue 1	An initiative prohibiting the hunting of mourning doves.	Failed	1,348,533 (40.55%)	1,976,981 (59.45%)

=== 1999 ===
Measure name	Description	Status	Yes votes	No votes
Issue 1	A constitutional amendment authorizing the issuance of bonds to fund the acquisition, construction, and improvement of public educational institutions.	Passed	1,303,830 (60.81%)	840,240 (39.19%)

== 2000s ==
=== 2000 ===
Measure name	Description	Status	Yes votes	No votes
Issue 1	A constitutional amendment authorizing the issuance of bonds to finance projects for environmental conservation and revitalization purposes.	Passed	2,197,773 (57.44%)	1,628,716 (42.56%)

=== 2002 ===
Measure name	Description	Status	Yes votes	No votes
Issue 1	An initiated constitutional amendment allowing persons charged with illegal drug possession to choose treatment instead of incarceration in certain circumstances.	Failed	1,012,682 (33.08%)	2,048,770 (66.92%)

=== 2003 ===
Measure name	Description	Status	Yes votes	No votes
Issue 1	A constitutional amendment authorizing the issuance of bonds and other financial assistance to support science and technology research.	Failed	1,195,706 (49.19%)	1,235,323 (50.81%)

=== 2004 ===
Measure name	Description	Status	Yes votes	No votes
Issue 1	An initiated constitutional amendment defining marriage as a union between one man and one woman.	Passed	3,329,335 (61.71%)	2,065,462 (38.29%)

=== 2005 ===
Measure name	Description	Status	Yes votes	No votes
Issue 1	A constitutional amendment allowing the state to issue $2 billion in general obligation bonds.	Passed	1,512,669 (54.12%)	1,282,571 (45.88%)
Issue 2	An initiated constitutional amendment authorizing absentee voting for all voters.	Failed	1,065,109 (36.66%)	1,840,658 (63.34%)
Issue 3	An initiated constitutional amendment establishing limits on political contributions and requiring public disclosure of campaign expenditures.	Failed	955,334 (33.14%)	1,927,502 (66.86%)
Issue 4	An initiated constitutional amendment establishing a state legislative and congressional redistricting commission.	Failed	871,898 (30.30%)	2,005,952 (69.70%)
Issue 5	An initiated constitutional amendment establishing an appointed board to administer statewide elections.	Failed	854,918 (29.92%)	2,001,983 (70.08%)

=== 2006 ===
Measure name	Description	Status	Yes votes	No votes
Issue 2	An initiated constitutional amendment raising the minimum wage to $6.85 per hour.	Passed	2,205,929 (56.65%)	1,688,029 (43.35%)
Issue 3	An initiated constitutional amendment permitting slot machines at horse racing tracks.	Failed	1,753,452 (43.40%)	2,286,840 (56.60%)
Issue 4	An initiated constitutional amendment prohibiting tobacco smoking in certain enclosed spaces.	Failed	1,450,164 (35.89%)	2,590,448 (64.11%)
Issue 5	An initiative prohibiting tobacco smoking in public places.	Passed	2,370,314 (58.52%)	1,679,833 (41.48%)

=== 2008 ===
Measure name	Description	Status	Yes votes	No votes
Issue 1	A constitutional amendment changing the signature deadline for initiatives.	Passed	3,397,389 (68.67%)	1,550,365 (31.33%)
Issue 2	A constitutional amendment authorizing the issuance of bonds for environmental conservation.	Passed	3,574,294 (69.27%)	1,585,410 (30.73%)
Issue 3	A constitutional amendment protecting property owners' right to reasonably use ground water beneath their land.	Passed	3,631,380 (71.95%)	1,415,933 (28.05%)
Issue 5	A referendum on whether a law relating to payday lending fees, interest rates, and practices should go into effect.	Passed	3,396,968 (63.61%)	1,943,721 (36.39%)
Issue 6	An initiated constitutional amendment authorizing construction of a casino in Chester Township, Clinton County.	Failed	2,092,074 (37.64%)	3,466,574 (62.36%)

=== 2009 ===
Measure name	Description	Status	Yes votes	No votes
Issue 1	A constitutional amendment authorizing the issuance of bonds to provide compensation to veterans of certain wars.	Passed	2,277,521 (72.21%)	876,520 (27.79%)
Issue 2	A constitutional amendment establishing the Ohio Livestock Care Standards Board.	Passed	2,020,851 (63.76%)	1,148,538 (36.24%)
Issue 3	An initiated constitutional amendment authorizing a casino in Cincinnati, Cleveland, Columbus, and Toledo, and levying a tax on casino revenue.	Passed	1,713,288 (52.99%)	1,519,636 (47.01%)

== 2010s ==
=== 2010 ===
Measure name	Description	Status	Yes votes	No votes
Issue 1	A constitutional amendment authorizing $700 million in bonds for the Ohio Third Frontier program.	Passed	1,050,278 (61.73%)	651,001 (38.27%)
Issue 2	A constitutional amendment changing the location of the Columbus casino.	Passed	1,154,518 (68.32%)	534,025 (31.68%)

=== 2011 ===
Measure name	Description	Status	Yes votes	No votes
Issue 1	A constitutional amendment raising the mandatory judicial retirement age to 75.	Failed	1,273,536 (37.97%)	2,080,207 (62.03%)
Issue 2	A referendum limiting collective bargaining for public employees.	Failed	1,373,724 (38.41%)	2,202,404 (61.59%)
Issue 3	An initiated constitutional amendment prohibiting the state from compelling participation in a healthcare system.	Passed	2,268,470 (65.58%)	1,190,385 (34.42%)

=== 2012 ===
Measure name	Description	Status	Yes votes	No votes
Issue 1	A measure calling for a constitutional convention.	Failed	1,523,239 (31.92%)	3,248,142 (68.08%)
Issue 2	An initiated constitutional amendment establishing a citizen redistricting commission for state legislative and congressional districts.	Failed	1,800,107 (36.82%)	3,088,414 (63.18%)

=== 2014 ===
Measure name	Description	Status	Yes votes	No votes
Issue 1	A constitutional amendment authorizing the issuance of bonds to fund public infrastructure projects.	Passed	797,207 (65.11%)	427,273 (34.89%)

=== 2015 ===
Measure name	Description	Status	Yes votes	No votes
Issue 1	A constitutional amendment creating the Ohio Redistricting Commission responsible for state legislative redistricting.	Passed	2,126,822 (71.47%)	849,043 (28.53%)
Issue 2	A constitutional amendment prohibiting ballot measures that create monopolies.	Passed	1,621,329 (51.33%)	1,537,261 (48.67%)
Issue 3	An initiated constitutional amendment legalizing recreational marijuana and granting certain facilities a monopoly on the production and sale of marijuana.	Failed	1,166,692 (36.35%)	2,042,902 (63.65%)

=== 2017 ===
Measure name	Description	Status	Yes votes	No votes
Issue 1	An initiated constitutional amendment enacting Marsy's Law to expand the rights of crime victims.	Passed	1,921,172 (82.59%)	404,957 (17.41%)
Issue 2	An initiative requiring the state to purchase drugs at prices no higher than the prices that the VA pays.	Failed	483,983 (20.85%)	1,837,608 (79.15%)

=== 2018 ===
==== May 2018 ====
Measure name	Description	Status	Yes votes	No votes
Issue 1	A constitutional amendment changing the vote requirements and the procedures for congressional redistricting.	Passed	1,178,468 (74.89%)	395,088 (25.11%)

==== November 2018 ====
Measure name	Description	Status	Yes votes	No votes
Issue 1	An initiated constitutional amendment making drug possession and use offenses no more than misdemeanors and allocating savings to drug treatment, crime victim, and rehabilitation programs.	Failed	1,623,933 (36.97%)	2,769,140 (63.03%)

== 2020s ==
=== 2022 ===
Measure name	Description	Status	Yes votes	No votes
Issue 1	A constitutional amendment requiring courts to consider factors such as public safety, the seriousness of the offense, and the person's criminal record when setting the amount of bail.	Passed	3,107,629 (77.50%)	901,997 (22.50%)
Issue 2	A constitutional amendment prohibiting noncitizens from voting.	Passed	3,099,868 (76.90%)	931,205 (23.10%)

=== 2023 ===
==== August 2023 ====
Measure name	Description	Status	Yes votes	No votes
Issue 1	A constitutional amendment requiring a 60% vote to approve a constitutional amendment and require citizen-initiated constitutional amendment campaigns to collect signatures from all 88 of Ohio's counties.	Failed	1,329,052 (42.89%)	1,769,482 (57.11%)

==== November 2023 ====
Measure name	Description	Status	Yes votes	No votes
Issue 1	An initiated constitutional amendment establishing the individual right to make and carry out one's own reproductive decisions on abortion, contraception, fertility treatment, and miscarriage care, and prohibiting the state from restricting abortion prior to fetal viability.	Passed	2,227,384 (56.78%)	1,695,480 (43.22%)
Issue 2	An initiative legalizing recreational marijuana and imposing a 10% tax on marijuana sales.	Passed	2,226,399 (57.19%)	1,666,316 (42.81%)

=== 2024 ===
Measure name	Description	Status	Yes votes	No votes
Issue 1	An initiated constitutional amendment establishing the Ohio Citizens Redistricting Commission, a non-politician commission responsible for state legislative and congressional redistricting.	Failed	2,531,900 (46.29%)	2,937,489 (53.71%)

=== 2025 ===
Measure name	Description	Status	Yes votes	No votes
Issue 2	A constitutional amendment authorizing the issuance of up to $2.5 billion in bonds to fund public infrastructure projects.	Passed	593,691 (67.81%)	281,862 (32.19%)

=== 2026 ===
Measure name	Description	Status	Yes votes	No votes
Issue 3	A constitutional amendment requiring photo ID to vote.	Passed	2,939,501 (65.36%)	1,557,866 (34.64%)
