= 2014 Yamaguchi gubernatorial election =

Japanese gubernatorial election

- 23 February 2014
- Turnout: 38.82 ▼6.50
Candidate	Tsugumasa Muraoka	Tsutomu Takamura
Party	LDP	Liberal Party
Popular vote	286,996	115,763
Percentage	63.90%	25.77%
Governor before election
Shigetaro Yamamoto
LDP
Elected Governor
Tsugumasa Muraoka
LDP

The 2014 Yamaguchi gubernatorial election was held on 23 February 2014 to elect the next governor of Yamaguchi (山口県, Yamaguchi-ken), a prefecture of Japan in the Chūgoku region of the main island of Honshu.

The outgoing governor, Shigetaro Yamamoto, suffered from lung cancer, which led him to resign on 9 January 2014. An election was organized for 23 February to replace him. He died on 15 March, 2014.

== Candidates ==
- Tsugumasa Muraoka, former official of the Internal Affairs and Communications Ministry, endorsed by LDP and Komeito.
- Tsutomu Takamura, former member of the House of Representatives (for the DPJ), endorsed by the People's Life Party.
- Naoko Fujii, former member of the Shunan Municipal Assembly, for the JCP.

== Results ==
Yamaguchi gubernatorial 2014
Party	Candidate	Votes	%	±%
LDP	Tsugumasa Muraoka	286,996	63.90	▲16.33
Liberal	Tsutomu Takamura	115,763	25.77	
JCP	Naoko Fujii	46,402	10.33	
Turnout		456,974	38.82	▼6.50
Registered electors		1,177,091		
LDP hold		Swing		
