= Tsugumasa Muraoka =

Japanese politician (born 1972)

- 村岡 嗣政
- Muraoka in 2025

Governor of Yamaguchi Prefecture
- Incumbent
- Assumed office February 25, 2014
- Monarchs: Akihito; Naruhito
- Preceded by: Shigetarō Yamamoto

Personal details
- Born: December 7, 1972 (age 53) Ube, Yamaguchi, Japan
- Party: LDP (since 2017)
- Other political affiliations: Independent (2014–2017)
- Education: University of Tokyo (BEc)

Tsugumasa Muraoka (Japanese: 村岡 嗣政, Hepburn: Muraoka Tsugumasa; born December 7, 1972) is a Japanese politician who has been governor of Yamaguchi Prefecture since 2014.

== Biography ==
Muraoka was born on December 7, 1972, in Ube, Yamaguchi. He attended Ube City Nishigiwa Elementary School, Nishigiwa Middle School, and Yamaguchi Prefectural Ube High School. At the last of these, he became the president of the student council in his second year and founded a band inspired by the American singer Prince. He graduated from the University of Tokyo, Faculty of Economics.

In April 1996, Muraoka joined the Ministry of Home Affairs (now the Ministry of Internal Affairs and Communications). He became the director of the Finance Division in Hiroshima in August 2002 and later on Kochi Prefecture in April 2007, retiring from the latter on January 15, 2014. At a press release five days later, he announced that he would run in February's Yamaguchi gubernatorial election to replace Shigetarō Yamamoto as governor of Yamaguchi Prefecture, having been picked by the Liberal Democratic Party (LDP) Yamaguchi Prefectural Federation. He won the election with 286,996 votes, beating Tsutomu Takamura and Naoko Fujii, and became the second youngest governor in Japan after Eikei Suzuki of Mie Prefecture.

On July 27, 2017, Muraoka announced that he would run for reelection in the 2018 Yamaguchi gubernatorial election and that he would be joining the Liberal Democratic Party. He was elected for his second term after beating Yuzuru Kumano and for a third term after contesting the 2022 Yamaguchi gubernatorial election. He was elected for a fourth term in the 2026 Yamaguchi gubernatorial election.
