= 2018 Alaska Senate election =

- November 6, 2018

10 of 20 seats in the Alaska Senate 11 seats needed for a majority
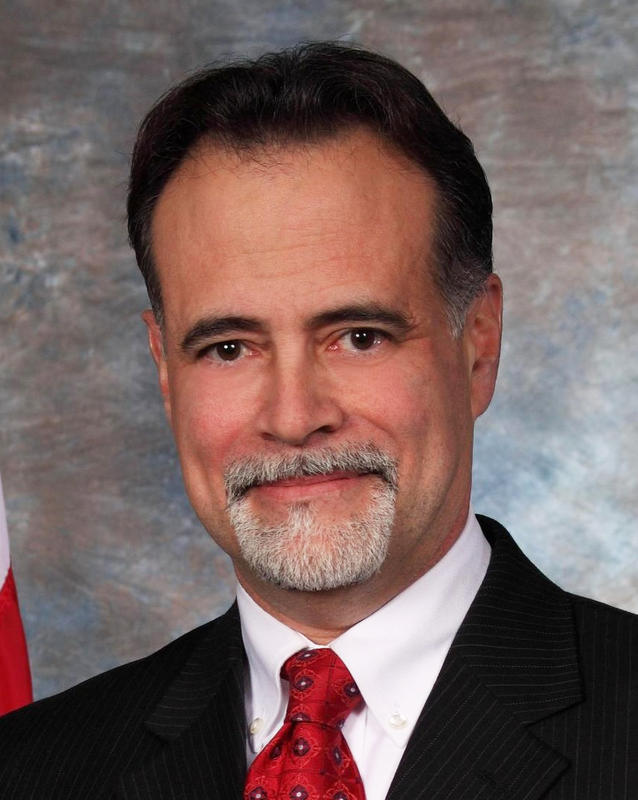

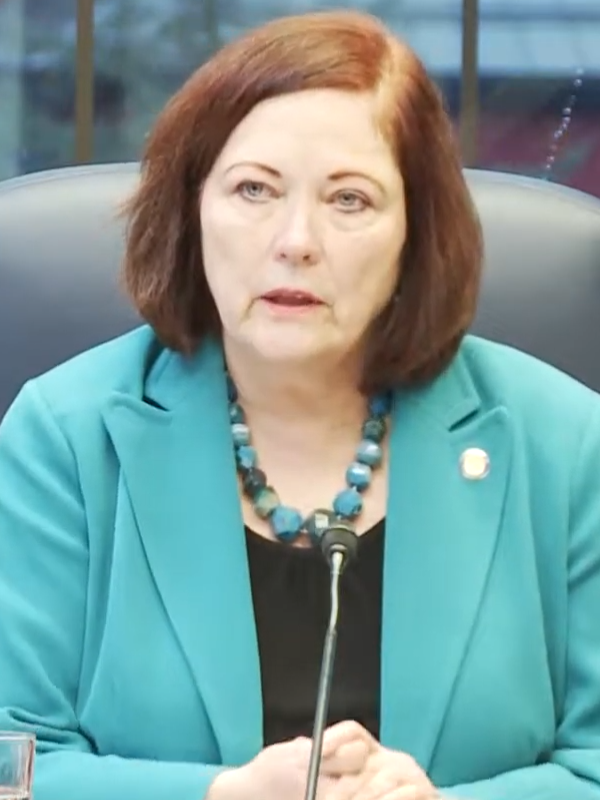
	Majority party	Minority party
Leader	Peter Micciche	Berta Gardner
Party	Republican	Democratic
Leader since	January 17, 2017	January 17, 2015
Leader's seat	District O	District I
Seats before	14	6
Seats after	13	7
Seat change	▼1	▲1
Popular vote	65,376	51,891
Percentage	50.12%	39.78%
- Results: Democratic gain Democratic hold Republican hold No election
President pro tempore before election
Peter Micciche
Republican
Elected President pro tempore
Peter Micciche
Republican

The 2018 Alaska Senate election was held on Tuesday, November 6, 2018, with the primary election on August 21, 2018. Voters in the 10 districts of the Alaska Senate elected their representatives. The elections coincided with the elections for the state House.

== Overview ==
2018 Alaska Senate election General election — November 6, 2018
Party	Votes	%	Seats not up	Seats up	Candidates	Before	After	+/–
Republican	65,376	50.12	6	8	8	14	13	▼1
Democratic	51,891	39.78	3	3	8	6	7	▲1
Independent	6,803	5.22	—	—	1	0	0	Steady
Write-ins	6,366	4.88	—	—	—	—	—	Steady

== Close races ==
District	Winner	Margin
District A	Democratic (flip)	1.99%
District K	Republican	14.32%
District M	Republican	17.25%

== Predictions ==
Source	Ranking	As of
Governing	Safe R	October 8, 2018

== Detailed results ==
=== District A ===
2018 Alaska Senate election, district A
Party	Candidate	Votes	%
Democratic	Scott Kawasaki	4,577	50.79
Republican	Pete Kelly (incumbent)	4,398	48.8
Write-ins	Write-ins	37	0.41
Total votes		9,012	100%
Democratic gain from Republican			

=== District C ===
2018 Alaska Senate election, district C
Party	Candidate	Votes	%
Republican	Click Bishop (incumbent)	10,030	92.05
Write-ins	Write-ins	866	7.95
Total votes		10,896	100%
Republican hold			

=== District E ===
2018 Alaska Senate election district E
Party	Candidate	Votes	%
Republican	Mike Shower (incumbent)	11,558	74.1
Democratic	Susan Kay	3,992	25.59
Write-ins	Write-ins	48	0.31
Total votes		15,598	100%
Republican hold			

=== District G ===
2018 Alaska Senate election, district G
Party	Candidate	Votes	%
Republican	Lora Reinbold	8,257	62.39
Democratic	Oliver Schiess	4,911	37.11
Write-ins	Write-ins	66	0.5
Total votes		13,234	100%
Republican hold			

=== District I ===
2018 Alaska Senate election, district I
Party	Candidate	Votes	%
Democratic	Elvi Gray-Jackson	6,724	59.9
Republican	Jim Crawford	4,462	39.75
Write-ins	Write-ins	39	0.35
Total votes		11,225	100%
Democratic hold			

=== District K ===
2018 Alaska Senate election, district K
Party	Candidate	Votes	%
Republican	Mia Costello (incumbent)	8,389	57.01
Democratic	Sam Cason	6,281	42.69
Write-ins	Write-ins	44	0.3
Total votes		14,714	100%
Republican hold			

=== District M ===
2018 Alaska Senate election, district M
Party	Candidate	Votes	%
Republican	Chris Birch	8,665	58.48
Democratic	Janice Park	6,110	41.23
Write-ins	Write-ins	43	0.29
Total votes		14,818	100%
Republican hold			

=== District O ===
2018 Alaska Senate election, district O
Party	Candidate	Votes	%
Republican	Peter Micciche (incumbent)	9,617	66.82
Write-ins	Write-ins	4,776	33.18
Total votes		14,393	100%
Republican hold			

=== District Q ===
2018 Alaska Senate election, district Q
Party	Candidate	Votes	%
Democratic	Jesse Kiehl	11,121	61.88
Independent	Don Etheridge	6,803	37.85
Write-ins	Write-ins	49	0.27
Total votes		17,973	100%
Democratic hold			

=== District S ===
2018 Alaska Senate election, district S
Party	Candidate	Votes	%
Democratic	Lyman Hoffman (incumbent)	8,175	95.36
Write-ins	Write-ins	398	4.64
Total votes		8,573	100%
Democratic hold			
