= 2018 Assam local elections =

Indian election

2018 Assam panchayat election
- 5 and 9 December

26,784 posts
- Turnout: 78.2% ▲
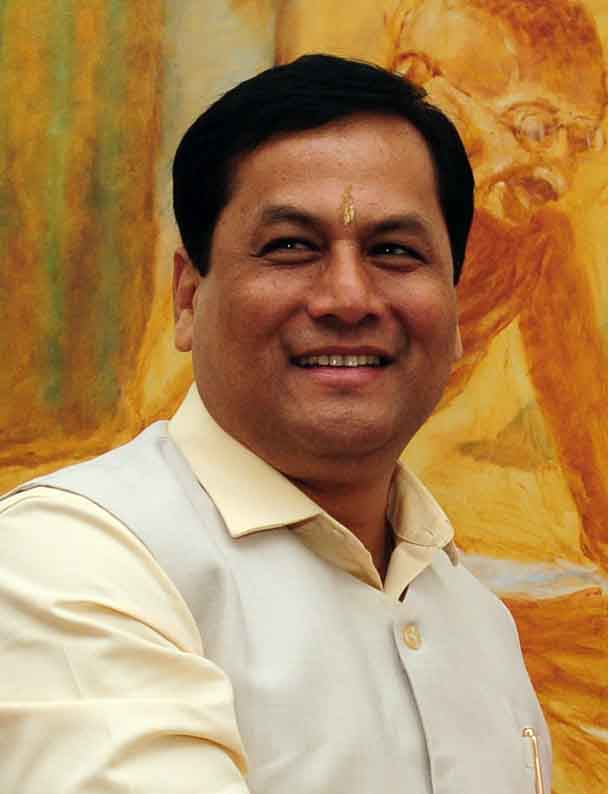

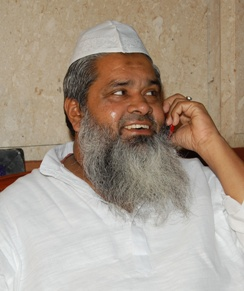
	First party	Second party
Leader	Sarbananda Sonowal	Debabrata Saikia
Party	BJP	INC
Leader since	2018	2018
Last election	1,780 [ZP+AP+GP(P)+GP(W)]	13,537 [ZP+AP+GP(P)+GP(W)]
Seats won	11,325 [ZP+AP+GP(P)+GP(W)]	8,970 [ZP+AP+GP(P)+GP(W)]
Seat change	▲9,545	▼4,567
	Third party	Fourth party
Leader	Atul Bora	Badruddin Ajmal
Party	AGP	AIUDF
Leader since	2016	2005
Last election	2,703 [ZP+AP+GP(P)+GP(W)]	3,551 [ZP+AP+GP(P)+GP(W)]
Seats won	1,963 [ZP+AP+GP(P)+GP(W)]	1,319 [ZP+AP+GP(P)+GP(W)]
Seat change	▼740	▼2,232

The 2018 Assam panchayat election were held in two phases, on 5 and 9 December 2018. The counting of votes started on 12 December and results were declared on 15 December. More than 15.6 million people were eligible to vote and voter turnout was over 78 per cent.

The Bharatiya Janata Party won 11,325 seats in total, while the Indian National Congress won 8,970 seats. Other parties won 6,489 seats.

== Background ==
Assam Panchayat Raj Act, 1994 made provisions for establishing a three-tier Panchayati Raj system in the State at the village, intermediate and district level.

Total number of Elected Representatives and Chairpersons in the State

No.	Panchayat	Representatives	Chairpersons
1.	Zilla Parishad	420	21
2.	Anchalik Panchayat	2,201	185
3.	Gaon Panchayat	24,222	2,201

== Election schedule ==
The Assam State Election Commission announced that the Polls would hold in two Phases. The polling for the first phase was held on 5 December 2018, while that for the second phase took place on 9 December 2018. The final counting of votes was started from 12 December 2018 in the 26 districts across the state.

In first phase, polls were held in Tinsukia, Dibrugarh, Sivasagar, Charaideo, Jorhat, Majuli, Golaghat, Nagaon, Dhemaji, Lakhimpur, Biswanath, Sonitpur, Darrang, Morigaon, Kamrup (Metro) and Kamrup districts. In the second phase, the election were held in Nalbari, Barpeta, Bongaigaon, Dhubri, South Salmara Mankachar, Goalpara, Cachar, Hailakandi, Karimganj and Hojai districts

== Party wise results ==
=== Zilla Parishad ===
The election results for 420 Zilla Parishad Members are as follows

No.	Political Party	Seats won	Seat share (in %)	Seat change
1.	BJP	212	50.48	▲197
2.	INC	147	35.00	▼126
3.	AIUDF	26	6.19	▼50
4.	AGP	19	4.52	▼10
5.	Others	16	3.81	▼11

=== Anchalik Panchayat ===
The election results for 2,197 Anchalik Panchayat Members are as follows

No.	Political Party	Seats won	Seat share (in %)	Seat change
1.	BJP	1,025	46.66	▲895
2.	INC	771	35.09	▼464
3.	AIUDF	139	6.33	▼258
4.	AGP	118	5.37	▼64
5.	Others	144	6.55	▼112

=== Gaon Panchayat (President) ===
The election results for 2,197 Gaon Panchayat Presidents are as follows

No.	Political Party	Seats won	Seat share (in %)	Seat change
1.	BJP	994	45.24	▲888
2.	INC	760	34.59	▼463
3.	AGP	137	6.24	▼46
4.	AIUDF	130	5.92	▼257
5.	Others	176	8.01	▼125

=== Gaon Panchayat (Ward) ===
The election results for 21,970 Gaon Panchayat Wards are as follows

No.	Political Party	Seats won	Seat share (in %)	Seat change
1.	BJP	9,094	41.39	▲7,565
2.	INC	7,292	33.19	▼3,514
3.	AGP	1,689	7.69	▼620
4.	AIUDF	1,024	4.66	▼1,599
5.	Others	2,871	13.07	▼1,502

=== Overall result ===
No.	Political Party	Seats won	Seat share (in %)	Seat change
1.	BJP	11,325	42.28	▲9,545
2.	INC	8,970	33.49	▼4,567
3.	AGP	1,963	7.33	▼740
4.	AIUDF	1,319	4.92	▼2,232
5.	Others	3,207	11.98	▼1,750

== District wise results ==
S.No.	District	Total	BJP	INC	AGP	AIUDF	Others
1	Nagaon	2,093	815	764	294	110	110
2	Cachar	1,971	919	710	15	19	308
3	Kamrup Rural	1,694	759	536	207	5	187
4	Dhubri	1,608	283	737	17	315	256
5	Barpeta	1,248	191	650	73	143	191
6	Golaghat	1,241	547	490	197	0	7
7	Karimganj	1,160	393	414	4	72	277
8	Dibrugarh	1,139	737	296	104	0	2
9	Jorhat	1,099	401	551	133	0	14
10	Tinsukia	1,040	745	256	18	0	21
11	Morigaon	1,033	370	416	68	54	125
12	Sonitpur	1,003	696	239	43	0	25
13	Sivasagar	1,001	463	403	129	0	6
14	Lakhimpur	989	497	292	59	15	126
15	Goalpara	988	388	355	19	80	346
16	Biswanath	925	769	119	11	0	26
17	Darrang	914	315	311	38	94	156
18	Hojai	816	319	295	57	129	16
19	Nalbari	793	523	212	27	0	31
20	Bongaigaon	792	156	250	239	79	68
21	Dhemaji	787	227	248	41	0	271
22	Hailakandi	755	187	16	6	35	511
23	Charaideo	439	326	106	4	0	3
24	South Salmara- Mankachar	425	18	127	83	151	46
25	Bajali	329	152	85	50	18	24
26	Kamrup Metropolitan	258	175	57	22	0	4
27	Majuli	244	154	35	5	0	50
Total		26,784	11,325	8,970	1,963	1,319	3,207

Legend

Largest Party (BJP) — 17
Largest Party (INC) — 7
Largest Party (AGP) — 0
Largest Party (AIUDF) — 1
Largest Party (Others) — 2

== See also ==
- 2021 Assam Legislative Assembly election
- 2019 Indian general election in Assam
