= 2018 Utah elections =

The Utah general elections, 2018 were held in the U.S. state of Utah on November 6, 2018. One of Utah's U.S. Senate seats was up for election, as well as all four seats in the United States House of Representatives, fourteen Utah Senate seats and all of the Utah House of Representatives seats.

== United States Senate ==
Incumbent senator Orrin Hatch was eligible for re-election, but did not run in 2018. Republican Mitt Romney was elected to the U. S. Senate, defeating Democratic nominee and Salt Lake County Council member Jenny Wilson.

== United States House of Representatives ==
All of Utah's four seats in the United States House of Representatives were up for election in November. In districts 1, 2, and 3, Republican incumbents were re-elected. In district 4, Salt Lake County Mayor Ben McAdams defeated two-term incumbent Republican Mia Love.

== Utah Senate ==
Fifteen Utah Senate seats were up for election in November.

Affiliation	Party (Shading indicates majority caucus)		Total	
Affiliation	Republican	Democratic	Total	Vacant
Before 2018 elections	24	5	29	0
Latest voting share	83%	17%		
After 2018 elections	23	6	29	0

== Utah House of Representatives ==
All 75 seats in the Utah House of Representatives were up for election in November.

Affiliation	Party (Shading indicates majority caucus)		Total	
Affiliation	Republican	Democratic	Total	Vacant
Before 2018 elections	62	13	75	0
Latest voting share	83%	17%		
After 2018 elections	57	18	75	0

== State Board of Education ==
District 1
Candidate	Votes	%
Jennie Earl	33,238	60.6
Terryl Warner (incumbent)	21,618	39.4
Total votes	54,856	100.0

District 2
Candidate	Votes	%
Scott L. Hansen	28,811	60.5
Craig Pitts	18,819	39.5
Total votes	47,630	100.0

District 3
Candidate	Votes	%
Linda Hansen (incumbent)	31,380	73.8
Thomas Nedreberg	11,133	26.2
Total votes	42,513	100.0

District 5
Candidate	Votes	%
Laura Belnap (incumbent)	42,538	65.0
Patrick Riley	22,937	35.0
Total votes	65,475	100.0

District 6
Candidate	Votes	%
Brittney Cummins (incumbent)	39,316	100.0

District 9
Candidate	Votes	%
Cindy Davis	37,594	67.6
Avalie Muhlestein	17,988	32.4
Total votes	55,582	100.0

District 14
Candidate	Votes	%
Mark Huntsman (incumbent)	48,448	100.0
