= 2018 Sark general election =

General elections were held in Sark on 12 December 2018. The elections saw 15 candidates contest the nine available seats in the Chief Pleas, the first time seats were contested since 2012. Seven of the nine elected members were new to the legislature.

The election was conducted under plurality block voting.

== Results ==
Candidate	Votes	%	Notes
Helen Mildred Plummer	205	10.50	Re-elected
Philip David Long	192	9.84	Elected
John David Guille	191	9.79	Elected
Christopher Drillot	165	8.46	Elected
William George Raymond	152	7.79	Re-elected
Amanda Jayne de Carteret	143	7.33	Elected
Ellen Naomi Lalor	138	7.07	Elected
Rodney Stewart Lalor	123	6.30	Elected
Simon Ashley Couldridge	121	6.20	Elected
Edric Baker	110	5.64	Unseated
Diane Baker	108	5.64	Unseated
Fern Joanne Turner	100	5.13	
Natalie Alexandra Craik	90	4.61	
Michael Joseph Doyle	75	3.84	
Frank William Makepeace	38	1.95	
Total	1,951	100	
Valid votes	251	96.54	
Spoiled votes	9	3.46	
Total votes cast	260	100	
Registered voters/turnout	363	71.63	
Source: Returning Officer, BBC
