= 2018 Myanmar by-elections =

2018 Myanmar by-election
- 3 November 2018

4 (of the 440) seats to the Pyithu Hluttaw (House of Representatives) 1 (of the 224) seats to the Amyotha Hluttaw (House of Nationalities) 8 seats to Regional Parliaments
	First party	Second party
Leader	Aung San Suu Kyi	Than Htay
Party	NLD	USDP
Seats before	254 R / 135 N	30 R / 11 N
Seats after	257 R / 135 N	30 R / 12 N
Seat change	▲3 R / N	R / ▲1 N
President before election
Win Myint
NLD
President after election
Win Myint
NLD

By-elections were held in Myanmar on 3 November 2018 to fill 13 parliamentary seats: one in the Amyotha Hluttaw, four in the Pyithu Hluttaw, and eight in the State and Regional Hluttaw. The seats were left vacant due to the resignation or death of incumbent Members of Parliament.

== Results ==
=== House of Nationalities ===
Kachin 2
Candidate	Party	Votes	%
Si Hu Dwe	Union Solidarity and Development Party	23,886	35.13
Kwong Goung Aung Kham	Kachin Democratic Party	19,112	28.11
Daw Yam Khon	National League for Democracy	18,999	27.94
Daw Khin Ohn	Shan-Ni & Northern Shan Ethnics Solidarity Party	3,541	5.21
Than Thing Oo	Independent	1,504	2.21
M. D. Khonyue	Union Nationalities Federal Democratic Party	950	1.40
Total		67,992	100.00
Valid votes		67,992	97.91
Invalid/blank votes		1,451	2.09
Total votes		69,443	100.00
Registered voters/turnout		203,292	34.16
Source: UEC

=== House of Representatives ===
Kanpetlet
Candidate	Party	Votes	%
Nyun Win	National League for Democracy	3,083	37.16
Ma Na Nai	Union Solidarity and Development Party	2,527	30.46
Kee Than Lun	Chin National Democratic Party	2,445	29.47
Mana Shin	Chin Progressive Party	242	2.92
Total		8,297	100.00
Valid votes		8,297	98.40
Invalid/blank votes		135	1.60
Total votes		8,432	100.00
Registered voters/turnout		12,449	67.73
Source: UEC

Myingyan
Candidate	Party	Votes	%
Sein Myint	National League for Democracy	67,659	75.82
Than Win	Union Solidarity and Development Party	17,025	19.08
Phyo Han	New Society Democratic Party	3,425	3.84
Ye Kyaw Aung	People's Workers Party	1,129	1.27
Total		89,238	100.00
Valid votes		89,238	97.92
Invalid/blank votes		1,892	2.08
Total votes		91,130	100.00
Registered voters/turnout		221,865	41.07
Source: UEC

Tamwe
Candidate	Party	Votes	%
Toe Win	National League for Democracy	27,809	85.39
Myo Win Kyaw	Union Solidarity and Development Party	3,714	11.40
Daw Thet Aye	Rakhine Democratic League Party	315	0.97
Zin Aung	People's New Democratic Party	192	0.59
C. C. Naw Ja	Union Nationalities Federal Democratic Party	187	0.57
Tun Tun Win	People's Workers Party	172	0.53
Myint Kyi	Democratic Party	128	0.39
Myint San Tun	People's Democratic Party	49	0.15
Total		32,566	100.00
Valid votes		32,566	98.88
Invalid/blank votes		368	1.12
Total votes		32,934	100.00
Registered voters/turnout		99,119	33.23
Source: UEC

Lai-Hka
Candidate	Party	Votes	%
Sai Ukka	Shan Nationalities League for Democracy	8,550	76.50
Sai Shwe Sain	Shan Nationalities Democratic Party	1,613	14.43
Sai Aung Tun	National League for Democracy	1,013	9.06
Total		11,176	100.00
Valid votes		11,176	90.00
Invalid/blank votes		1,242	10.00
Total votes		12,418	100.00
Registered voters/turnout		39,321	31.58
Source: UEC

=== State/Region Hluttaw ===
Party	Votes	Votes %	Seats Won	Seats %	Change	Seats Before	Seats After
National League for Democracy			4				
Union Solidarity and Development Party			2				
Chin League for Democracy			1				
Independent			1				
Total		100	8	100		224	224

=== Results by Constituency ===
Constituency	State/Region	House	Party Before	Party After	Incumbent MP	Reason for Vacancy	Elected MP
Myitkyina 2	Kachin	Nationalities		Union Solidarity and Development Party			
Kanpetlet	Chin	Representatives		National League for Democracy			
Myingyan	Mandalay	Representatives		National League for Democracy			
Lechar	Shan	Representatives		Shan Nationalities League for Democracy			
Tamwe	Yangon	Representatives		National League for Democracy			
Matupi 1	Chin	State/Region		Chin League for Democracy			
Ottwin 1	Bago	State/Region		National League for Democracy			
Thabeikkyin 1	Mandalay	State/Region		National League for Democracy			
Ethnic Affairs Minister (Shan)	Mandalay	State/Region	National League for Democracy	National League for Democracy			U Sai Seng Mai
Minbu 2	Magway	State/Region		National League for Democracy			
Rathedaung 2	Rakhine	State/Region		Independent			Tin Maung Win
Tamu 2	Sagaing	State/Region		Union Solidarity and Development Party			
Seikkan 2	Yangon	State/Region	National League for Democracy	Union Solidarity and Development Party			Nay Myo Aung
