= 2018 Oregon Ballot Measure 106 =

Measure 106
- Prohibits spending "public funds" directly/indirectly for "abortion"; exceptions; reduces abortion access

Results
Choice	Votes	%
Yes	658,793	35.52%
No	1,195,718	64.48%
Total votes	1,854,511	100.00%

No
50%–60%
60%–70%
70%–80%
80%–90%
Yes
50%–60%
60%–70%

Oregon Ballot Measure 106 was a ballot measure on the 2018 election ballot in the U.S. state of Oregon.

The measure, a proposed amendment to the state Constitution, would have barred the use of public funds to pay for abortions in Oregon, "except when medically necessary or required by federal law." The measure would have affected persons with Medicaid health insurance coverage and state employees. The measure was defeated by a broad margin, with 1,195,718 "no" votes (64.48%), and 658,793 "yes" (35.52%) votes. The measure was rejected in all five of Oregon’s congressional districts at the time.

The measure was sponsored by anti-abortion activists, who succeeded in placing the measure on the ballot in 2018 after failures in the previous three election cycles. Planned Parenthood and other groups opposed the measure.

Vote tallies by county:

County	No	Votes	Yes	Votes	Total
Baker	43.28	3,537	56.72	4,635	8,172
Benton	73.18	32,349	26.82	11,855	44,204
Clackamas	62.09	122,980	37.91	75,094	198,074
Clatsop	64.75	11,920	35.25	6,488	18,408
Columbia	58.08	14,250	41.92	10,285	24,535
Coos	53.86	15,371	46.14	13,164	28,535
Crook	43.18	4,931	56.82	6,488	11,419
Curry	53.69	6,141	46.31	5,297	11,438
Deschutes	61.20	58,107	38.80	36,836	94,943
Douglas	46.57	22,513	53.43	25,829	48,342
Gilliam	47.67	471	52.33	517	988
Grant	43.51	1,649	56.49	2,141	3,790
Harney	41.91	1,464	58.09	2,030	3,494
Hood River	71.71	7,693	28.29	3,035	10,728
Jackson	55.29	56,052	44.71	45,323	101,375
Jefferson	49.06	4,307	50.94	4,472	8,779
Josephine	47.21	18,968	52.79	21,215	40,183
Klamath	41.47	11,626	58.53	16,406	28,032
Lake	34.97	1,221	65.03	2,271	3,492
Lane	69.15	122,175	30.85	54,513	176,688
Lincoln	67.60	16,286	32.40	7,805	24,091
Linn	47.93	26,113	52.07	28,370	54,483
Malheur	38.46	3,381	61.54	5,411	8,792
Marion	54.82	69,361	45.18	57,156	126,517
Morrow	44.01	1,575	55.99	2,174	3,749
Multnomah	83.02	312,457	16.98	63,907	376,364
Polk	54.59	20,297	45.41	16,880	37,177
Sherman	47.09	453	52.91	509	962
Tillamook	60.59	7,892	39.41	5,133	13,025
Umatilla	44.88	10,708	55.12	13,149	23,857
Union	46.66	5,457	53.34	6,237	11,694
Wallowa	46.60	1,869	53.40	2,142	4,011
Wasco	58.97	6,665	41.03	4,638	11,303
Washington	68.81	169,576	31.19	76,851	246,427
Wheeler	40.97	322	59.03	464	786
Yamhill	56.04	25,581	43.96	20,063	45,644
