= 2018 Arkansas elections =

A general election was held in the U.S. state of Arkansas on November 6, 2018. All of Arkansas' executive officers were up for election as well as all of Arkansas' four seats in the United States House of Representatives. Primaries were held on May 22, 2018. Polls were open from 7:30 AM to 7:30 PM CST. Republicans retained all statewide offices and all four seats in the United States House of Representatives.

== Governor ==
Republican governor Asa Hutchinson was elected to a second term.

2018 Arkansas gubernatorial election
Party	Candidate	Votes	%
Republican	Asa Hutchinson (incumbent)	582,406	65.33
Democratic	Jared K. Henderson	283,218	31.77
Libertarian	Mark West	25,885	2.90
Total votes		891,509	100.0
Republican hold			

== Lieutenant governor ==
Republican lieutenant governor Tim Griffin was elected to a second term.

2018 Arkansas lieutenant gubernatorial election
Party	Candidate	Votes	%
Republican	Tim Griffin (incumbent)	570,433	64.18
Democratic	Anthony Bland	293,535	33.03
Libertarian	Frank Gilbert	24,767	2.79
Total votes		888,735	100.0
Republican hold			

== Attorney general ==
Republican Attorney General Leslie Rutledge was elected to a second term.

2018 Arkansas attorney general election
Party	Candidate	Votes	%
Republican	Leslie Rutledge (incumbent)	549,668	61.80
Democratic	Mike Lee	315,099	35.43
Libertarian	Kerry Hicks	24,652	2.77
Total votes		889,419	100.0
Republican hold			

== Secretary of state ==
Republican incumbent Mark Martin was term-limited and could not seek a third term.

2018 Arkansas secretary of state election
Party	Candidate	Votes	%
Republican	John Thurston	537,581	60.64
Democratic	Susan Inman	323,644	36.51
Libertarian	Christopher Olson	25,320	2.86
Total votes		886,545	100.0
Republican hold			

== State treasurer ==
Republican treasurer Dennis Milligan was elected to a second term. No Democrat filed to run for this office.

2018 Arkansas treasurer election
Party	Candidate	Votes	%
Republican	Dennis Milligan (incumbent)	611,189	70.89
Libertarian	Ashley Ewald	250,943	29.11
Total votes		862,132	100.0
Republican hold			

== State auditor ==
Republican auditor Andrea Lea was elected to a second term. No Democrat filed to run for this office.

=== Republican nominee ===
- Andrea Lea, incumbent auditor

=== Libertarian nominee ===
- David Dinwiddie

=== General election ===
Results by county Lea: 50–60%; 60–70%; 70–80%; 80–90%

2018 Arkansas auditor election
Party	Candidate	Votes	%
Republican	Andrea Lea (incumbent)	621,772	72.35
Libertarian	David Dinwiddie	237,602	27.65
Total votes		859,374	100.0
Republican hold			

== Commissioner of State Lands ==
Incumbent Republican Commissioner of State Lands John Thurston was term-limited and ran successfully for the office of Secretary of State.

2018 Arkansas Commissioner of State Lands election
Party	Candidate	Votes	%
Republican	Tommy Land	530,230	60.05
Democratic	Larry Williams	323,682	36.66
Libertarian	T.J. Campbell	29,123	3.30
Total votes		883,035	100.0
Republican hold			

== General Assembly ==
=== State Senate ===
18 out of 35 seats in the Arkansas Senate were up for election. Out of the contested seats, the Republican Party won 13 while the Democratic Party won five. The resulting composition was 29 Republicans and six Democrats, same as in 2016.

=== State House of Representatives ===
All 100 seats in the Arkansas House of Representatives were up for election. Republicans won 76 while Democrats won 24. Both parties flipped two seats each.

2018 Arkansas House of Representatives election
Party	Before	After	Change
Republican	75	76	▲1
Democratic	24	24	Steady
vacant	1	0	▼1
Total	100		

== United States House of Representatives ==
All of Arkansas' four seats in the United States House of Representatives were up for election in 2018. Republicans held on to all four seats.

District	Republican		Democratic		Others		Total		Result
District	Votes	%	Votes	%	Votes	%	Votes	%	Result
District 1	138,757	68.95%	57,907	28.77%	4,581	2.28%	201,245	100%	Republican hold
District 2	132,125	52.13%	116,135	45.82%	5,193	2.05%	253,453	100%	Republican hold
District 3	148,717	64.78%	74,952	32.65%	6,039	2.57%	229,568	100%	Republican hold
District 4	136,740	66.74%	63,984	31.23%	4,168	2.03%	204,892	100%	Republican hold
Total	556,339	62.56%	312,978	35.19%	19,981	2.25%	889,298	100%	

== State Supreme Court ==
One seat on the Arkansas Supreme Court was up for election.

=== Associate Justice, Position 3 ===
Incumbent Justice Courtney Goodson won re-election to a second term.

==== Candidates ====
- Courtney Goodson, incumbent
- David Sterling, chief legal counsel for the Arkansas Department of Human Services
- Kenneth Hixson, judge on the third district of the Arkansas Court of Appeals

==== General election ====
Results by county Goodson: 30–40%; 40–50%; 50–60%; Sterling: 30–40%; 40–50%; Hixson: 30–40%; 60–70%

2018 Arkansas Supreme Court Associate Justice Position 3 election
Party	Candidate	Votes	%
Nonpartisan	Courtney Goodson (incumbent)	113,832	37.13
Nonpartisan	David Sterling	104,819	34.19
Nonpartisan	Kenneth Hixson	87,951	28.69
Total votes		306,602	100.0

==== Runoff ====
Runoff results by county Goodson: 50–60%; 60–70%; Sterling: 50–60%

2018 Arkansas Supreme Court Associate Justice Position 3 runoff election
Party	Candidate	Votes	%
Nonpartisan	Courtney Goodson (incumbent)	463,677	55.66
Nonpartisan	David Sterling	369,306	44.34
Total votes		832,983	100.0

== Ballot Measures ==
Three statewide measures appeared on the ballot in 2018, all of which were approved.

=== Issue 2 ===
Issue 2 results by county Yes: 80–90%; 70–80%; 60–70%

The Voter ID Amendment, or simply Arkansas Issue 2, would require individuals to present valid photo ID to cast non-provisional ballots in person or absentee.

Arkansas Issue 2
Choice	Votes	%
For	692,622	79.47
Against	178,936	20.53
Total	871,558	100.00

=== Issue 4 ===
Issue 4 results by county Yes: 60–70%; 50–60%; No: 60–70%; 50–60%

The Casinos Authorized in Crittenden, Garland, Pope, and Jefferson Counties Initiative, or simply Arkansas Issue 4, would support the authorization of one casino each in Crittenden, Garland, Pope, and Jefferson counties.

Arkansas Issue 4
Choice	Votes	%
For	470,954	54.10
Against	399,530	45.90
Total	870,484	100.00

=== Issue 5 ===
The Minimum Wage Increase Initiative, or simply Arkansas Issue 5, would raise the minimum wage in the state to $11 an hour by 2021.

It was approved by a 68-32 margin.
