= 2018 Geneva Grand Council election =

The 2018 election to the Grand Council was held in the canton of Geneva, Switzerland, on 15 April 2018. All 100 members of the Grand Council were elected for four-year terms.

== Results ==
Summary of the 15 April 2018 Geneva Grand Council election results
Party	Ideology	Vote %	Vote % ±	Seats	Seats ±
PLR.The Liberal-Radicals (PLR)	Classical liberalism	25.18	+2.81	28	+4
Socialist Party (PS)	Democratic socialism	15.30	+0.97	17	+2
Greens (PES)	Green politics	13.16	+4.00	15	+5
Christian Democratic Party (PDC)	Christian democracy	10.71	+0.11	12	+1
Geneva Citizens' Movement (MCG)	Right-wing populism	9.43	−9.80	11	−9
Together Left (EAG)^{1}	Communism	7.83	−0.92	9	0
Democratic Union of the Centre (UDC)	National conservatism	7.32	−3.02	8	−3
Geneva Forward		4.10	+4.10	0	0
Women's List 2018		3.26	+3.26	0	0
Green Liberal Party	Green liberalism	1.60	−1.46	0	0
Equality and Equity		0.88	+0.88	0	0
List for Geneva		0.71	+0.71	0	0
Conservative Democratic Party	Conservative liberalism	0.52	−0.04	0	0
Total		100.00	–	100	–
Turnout		38.77	2.28 ▼	–	–
^{1} Alliance of SolidaritéS, Swiss Party of Labour, left-wing independents, Defence of the Elderly, Tenants of Housing and Social (DAL), Alternative Left, the Communist Party of Geneva, and Action of Citizens and Workers in Struggle (ACTE)
Source: Republic and Canton of Geneva
