= 2018 Nagano gubernatorial election =

Japanese gubernatorial election

- 5 August 2018
- Turnout: 43.28 ▼0.28
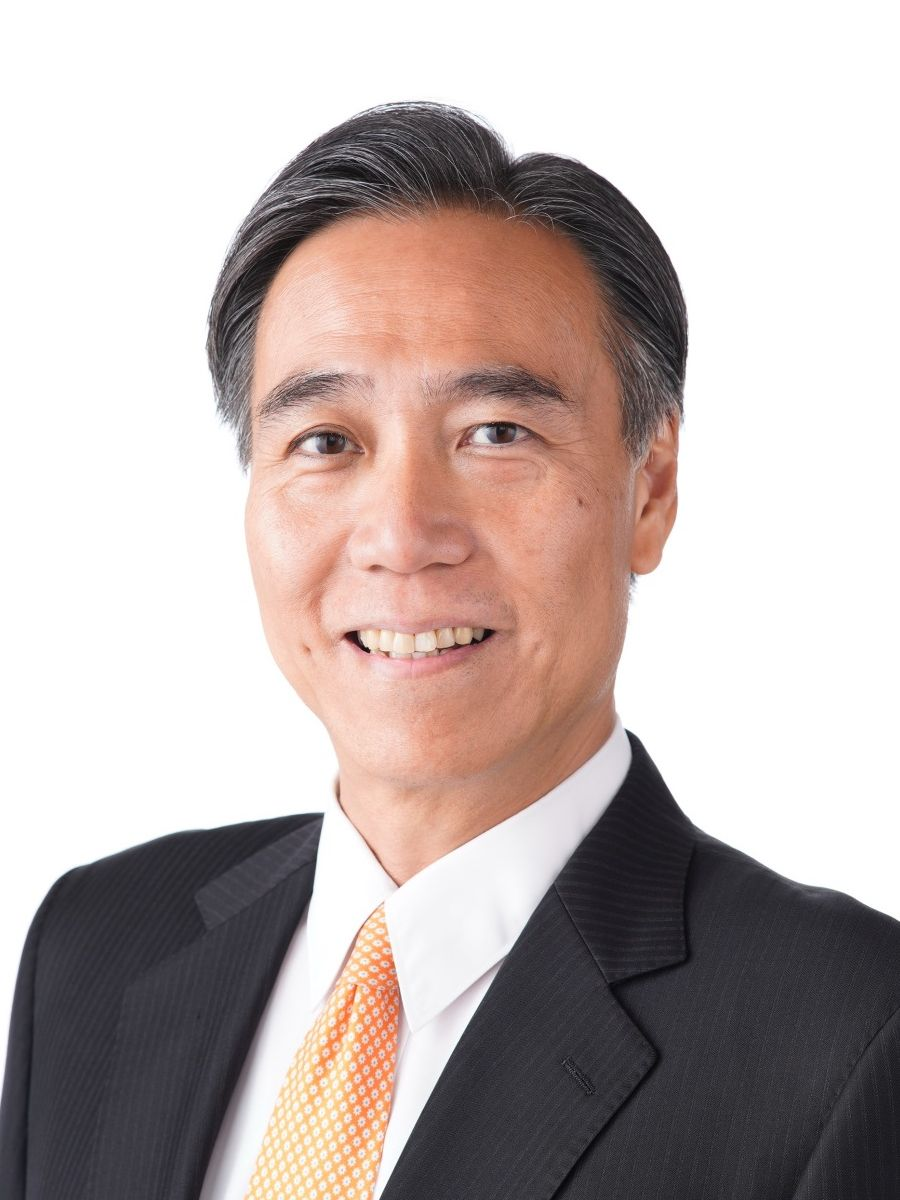
Candidate	Shuichi Abe	Chuichi Kanai
Party	Independent	JCP
Popular vote	635,365	110,930
Percentage	85.14%	14.86%
Governor before election
Shuichi Abe
Independent
Elected Governor
Shuichi Abe
Independent

The 2018 Nagano gubernatorial election was held on 5 August 2018 to elect the next governor of Nagano (長野県, Nagano-ken), a prefecture of Japan located in the Chūbu region of Honshu island. Incumbent Governor Shuichi Abe was re-elected for a third term, defeating Chuichi Kanai with 85.14% of the vote.

== Candidates ==
- Shuichi Abe, 57, incumbent since 2010, bureaucrat. Backed by DPFP, LDP, Komeito, CDP and SDP.
- Chuichi Kanai, 68, former Ueda Municipal Assembly member. Presented by the JCP.

== Results ==
Nagano gubernatorial 2018
Party	Candidate	Votes	%	±%
Independent	Shuichi Abe *	635,365	85.14	▲0.92
JCP	Chuichi Kanai	110,930	14.86	▲0.59
Turnout		752.792	43,28	▼0.28
Registered electors		1.739.481		
Democratic hold		Swing	70.28	
