= 2018 Connecticut elections =

- November 6, 2018

The 2018 Connecticut state elections were held on Tuesday, November 6, 2018, to elect the following offices: governor and lieutenant governor (on one ticket), attorney general, secretary of the state, comptroller, treasurer, U.S. Senate, U.S. House of Representatives, Connecticut State Senate, Connecticut State House of Representatives, and various others. Primary elections were held on August 14, 2018.

The Democratic Party performed strongly in federal elections with incumbent Democrats winning re-election to all five Connecticut seats in the U.S. House of Representatives by more than 10 points, and incumbent U.S. Senator Chris Murphy winning re-election by 20 points. Democrats also performed strongly in the Connecticut General Assembly, gaining 12 seats in the State House of Representatives and five seats in the State Senate. However, this "blue wave" did not transfer to all state elections. Although typically considered a "blue state", no Democrat had won a gubernatorial election in the state by more than five points since 1986. This continued in 2018, with Democratic nominee Ned Lamont only winning the governorship by three points.

== Federal offices ==
=== United States Senate ===
Incumbent Democratic U.S. Senator Chris Murphy won re-election against Republican Matthew Corey.

2018 United States Senate election in Connecticut
Party	Candidate	Votes	%	±%
Democratic	Chris Murphy	787,685	56.80%	+4.35%
Working Families	Chris Murphy	37,894	2.73%	+0.36%
Total	Chris Murphy (incumbent)	825,579	59.53%	+4.71%
Republican	Matthew Corey	545,717	39.35%	−3.94%
Libertarian	Richard Lion	8,838	0.64%	−1.02%
Green	Jeff Russell	6,618	0.48%	N/A
Write-in		88	0.00%	-0.45%
Total votes		1,386,840	100.00%	N/A
Democratic hold				

=== United States House of Representatives ===
Incumbent Democrats won re-election to all five Connecticut seats in the United States House of Representatives.

District	Democratic		Republican		Others		Total		Result
District	Votes	%	Votes	%	Votes	%	Votes	%	Result
District 1	166,155	60.61%	96,024	35.03%	11,961	4.36%	274,140	100.0%	Democratic hold
District 2	167,659	57.99%	102,483	35.45%	18,972	6.56%	289,114	100.0%	Democratic hold
District 3	163,211	60.40%	95,667	35.40%	11,361	4.20%	270,239	100.0%	Democratic hold
District 4	168,726	61.21%	103,175	37.43%	3,750	1.36%	275,651	100.0%	Democratic hold
District 5	142,901	52.80%	115,146	42.54%	12,617	4.66%	270,664	100.0%	Democratic hold
Total	808,652	58.61%	512,495	37.14%	58,661	4.25%	1,379,808	100.0%	

== State offices ==
=== Executive ===
==== Governor ====
Two-term incumbent Democratic Governor Dannel Malloy and Lieutenant Governor Nancy Wyman were eligible for a third term but declined to run for re-election. Democratic nominees Ned Lamont and his running mate Susan Bysiewicz won the election against Republican nominees Bob Stefanowski and Joe Markley.

2018 Connecticut gubernatorial election
Party	Candidate	Votes	%	±%
Democratic	Ned Lamont	676,649	48.10%	−0.36%
Working Families	Ned Lamont	17,861	1.27%	−1.00%
Total	Ned Lamont	694,510	49.37%	-1.36%
Republican	Bob Stefanowski	624,750	44.41%	−1.71%
Independent Party	Bob Stefanowski	25,388	1.80%	−0.24%
Total	Bob Stefanowski	650,138	46.21%	−1.95%
Griebel-Frank for CT Party	Oz Griebel	54,741	3.89%	N/A
Libertarian	Rod Hanscomb	6,086	0.43%	N/A
Amigo Constitution Liberty	Mark Greenstein	1,254	0.09%	N/A
Write-in	Lee Whitnum	74	0.01%	N/A
Total votes		1,406,803	100.00%	N/A
Democratic hold				

==== Attorney General ====
Two-term incumbent Democratic State Attorney General George Jepsen did not seek re-election. Democratic nominee and state representative William Tong defeated Republican nominee Susan Hatfield.

2018 Connecticut Attorney General election
Party	Candidate	Votes	%	±%
Democratic	William Tong	691,496	50.73%	−2.80%
Working Families	William Tong	23,844	1.75%	−1.44%
Total	William Tong	715,340	52.48%	-4.25%
Republican	Susan Hatfield	605,504	44.42%	+5.31%
Independent Party	Susan Hatfield	27,856	2.04%	+0.03%
Total	Susan Hatfield	633,360	46.47%	+5.35%
Green	Peter Goselin	14,358	1.05%	−1.10%
Total votes		1,363,058	100.0%	
Democratic hold				

==== Secretary of the State ====
Incumbent Democratic Secretary of the State Denise Merrill won re-election to a third term against Republican nominee Susan Chapman.

2018 Connecticut Secretary of the State election
Party	Candidate	Votes	%	±%
Democratic	Denise Merrill	735,743	53.80%	+5.71%
Working Families	Denise Merrill	28,324	2.07%	−0.79%
Total	Denise Merrill (incumbent)	764,067	55.87%	+4.91%
Republican	Susan Chapman	557,616	40.77%	−3.36%
Independent Party	Susan Chapman	23,163	1.69%	−0.93%
Total	Susan Chapman	580,779	42.46%	−4.29%
Green	S. Michael DeRosa	12,469	0.91%	−1.39%
Libertarian	Heather Lynn Sylvestre Gwynn	10,361	0.76%	N/A
Total votes		1,367,668	100.0%	
Democratic hold				

==== Comptroller ====
Two-term incumbent Democratic State Comptroller Kevin Lembo won re-election to a third term against Republican nominee Kurt Miller.

2018 Connecticut State Comptroller election
Party	Candidate	Votes	%	±%
Democratic	Kevin Lembo	718,033	52.96%	+0.67%
Working Families	Kevin Lembo	28,773	2.12%	−0.80%
Total	Kevin Lembo (incumbent)	746,806	55.08%	+2.79%
Republican	Kurt Miller	563,099	41.53%	−4.49%
Independent Party	Kurt Miller	22,411	1.65%	−1.08%
Total	Kurt Miller	585,510	43.18%	−2.84%
Libertarian	Paul Passarelli	13,165	0.97%	N/A
Green	Edward Heflin	10,360	0.76%	−0.94%
Total votes		1,355,838	100.0%	
Democratic hold				

==== Treasurer ====
Five-term incumbent Democratic State Treasurer Denise Nappier did not seek re-election. Democratic nominee Shawn Wooden defeated Republican nominee Thad Gray.

2018 Connecticut Secretary of the State election
Party	Candidate	Votes	%	±%
Democratic	Shawn Wooden	717,002	52.78%	−1.49%
Working Families	Shawn Wooden	31,089	2.29%	N/A
Total	Shawn Wooden	748,091	55.06%	+0.79%
Republican	Thad Gray	569,737	41.94%	−1.51%
Independent Party	Thad Gray	23,069	1.70%	+0.29%
Total	Thad Gray	592,811	43.63%	+0.18%
Libertarian	Jesse Brohinsky	15,514	1.14%	N/A
Write-in	W. Michael Downes	2,196	0.16%	N/A
Total votes		1,358,612	100.0%	
Democratic hold				

=== General Assembly ===
==== State Senate ====
Democrats won 23 seats while Republicans won 13, expanding their majority by five seats.

↓
23	13
Democratic	Republican

Parties	Candidates	Seats				Popular Vote		
Parties	Candidates	2016	2018	+/-	Strength	Vote	%	Change
Democratic	36	18	23	▲5	63.89%	725,644	53.10%	▲4.52%
Republican	34	18	13	▼5	36.11%	593,346	43.42%	▼2.92%
Independent Party	1 (Note: In addition, the Independent Party of Connecticut cross-endorsed 26 candidates, 2 Democrats and 24 Republicans.)	0	0	Steady	0.00%	26,513	1.94%	▼0.74%
Working Families	0 (Note: In addition, the Working Families Party of Connecticut cross-endorsed 20 candidates, all Democrats.)	0	0	Steady	0.00%	19,966	1.46%	▼0.57%
Green	3	0	0	Steady	0.00%	1,077	0.08%	▼0.15%
Total	74	36	36	0	100.00%	1,366,546	100.00%	-

==== State House of Representatives ====
Democrats won 92 seats while Republicans won 59, expanding their majority by 12 seats.

↓
92	59
Democratic	Republican

Parties	Seats			
Parties	2016	2018	+/-	Strength
Democratic	80	92	▲12	60.93%
Republican	71	59	▼12	39.07%
Total	151	151	151	100.00%
