= 2018 Yamaguchi gubernatorial election =

Election in Yamaguchi Prefecture, Honshu, Japan

- 4 February 2018
- Turnout: 36.49 ▼2.33
		JCP
Candidate	Tsugumasa Muraoka	Yuzuru Kumano
Party	LDP	JCP
Popular vote	347,762	75,207
Percentage	82.22%	17.78%
Governor before election
Tsugumasa Muraoka
LDP
Elected Governor
Tsugumasa Muraoka
LDP

The 2018 Yamaguchi gubernatorial election was held on 4 February 2018 to elect the next governor of Yamaguchi (山口県, Yamaguchi-ken), a prefecture of Japan in the Chūgoku region of the main island of Honshu.

== Candidates ==
- Tsugumasa Muraoka, incumbent, endorsed by LDP and Komeito.
- Yuzuru Kumano, former head of the local teachers' union, JCP.

== Results ==
Yamaguchi gubernatorial 2018
Party	Candidate	Votes	%	±%
LDP	Tsugumasa Muraoka *	347,762	82.22	n/a
JCP	Yuzuru Kumano	75,207	17.78	n/a
Turnout			36,49	▼2.33
Registered electors				
LDP hold		Swing		
