= 2018 Belizean municipal elections =

2018 municipal elections in Belize

Municipal elections were held in Belize on 7 March 2018. Voters elected a total 67 representatives. This includes a mayor in each of the nine communities, 42 town councils and 16 city councillors (ten in Belize City and six in Belmopan). The elections saw the People's United Party approach local parity with the ruling United Democratic Party. In 2015, the UDP won 62 out of the 67 seats nationwide, with the opposition People's United Party won the remaining seats. In 2018, the UDP won 41 seats, with the PUP picking up the remaining 26. The PUP gained complete council control of Belize City and Corozal Town, picked up a council seat in Dangriga, and regained complete control of the Orange Walk Town council. The Belize Progressive Party had 13 councillor candidates in three elections (Belize City, Belmopan, and Punta Gorda), and mayoral candidates in those three elections as well as in San Ignacio/Santa Elena. There were also seven independent candidates for mayor.

== Participating parties ==
- United Democratic Party
- People's United Party
- Belize Progressive Party

== Results ==
Summary of the 7 March 2018 Belizean Municipal Election
Party	Candidates	2015 Counselors	2018 Counselors	+/-	2015 Mayors	2018 Mayors	+/-
UDP	67	54	35	-19	8	6	-2
PUP	67	4	23	+19	1	3	+2
BPP	17	0	0	0	0	0	0
Ind.	7	0	0	0	0	0	0
Total	158	58	58	-	9	9	-

=== Belize City ===
The UDP could not hold onto its mayoral seat as Dion Leslie fell to PUP nominee Bernard Wagner, losing by nearly 1,000 votes. Independent candidate Eustaquio "Ernesto" Torres also ran for the mayoral seat. The PUP also swept all 10 seats on the Belize City Council.

=== Belmopan ===
In Belmopan, UDP mayoral candidate Khalid Belisle won re-election over the PUP's Tanya Santos and independent Richard Albert Smith. The UDP also held onto all six city council seats.

=== Towns ===
- Benque Viejo del Carmen: Noemi "Mimi" Perez (UDP) elected mayor; UDP wins town council 6-0.
- Corozal Town: Rigoberto Vellos (PUP) elected mayor; PUP wins town council 6-0.
- Dangriga: Francis Humphreys (UDP) re-elected mayor; UDP wins town council 5-1.
- Orange Walk Town: Kevin Bernard (PUP) re-elected mayor; PUP wins town council 6-0.
- Punta Gorda: Ashton McKenzie (UDP) elected mayor; UDP wins town council 6-0.
- San Ignacio/Santa Elena: Earl Trapp (UDP) re-elected mayor; UDP wins town council 6-0.
- San Pedro Town: Daniel Guerrero (UDP) re-elected mayor; UDP wins town council 6-0.
