= 2018 Massachusetts Governor's Council election =

- November 6, 2018

All 8 seats to the Massachusetts Governor's Council
| | Majority party | Minority party |
|---|---|---|
| Party | Democratic | Republican |
| Last election | 7 | 1 |
| Seats won | 7 | 1 |
| Seat change | Steady | Steady |
| Popular vote | 1,793,125 | 417,928 |
| Percentage | 76.4% | 17.8% |
| Swing | ▼ | ▼ |

On November 6, 2018, the U.S. state of Massachusetts held an election for each of the eight total seats for the Massachusetts Governor's Council.

Joseph Ferreia won the Democratic Party primary election vote, while Thomas Keyes won the overall Republican Party primary vote. Robert Jubinville was the independent candidate for the District 2 of the 8. Marilyn Petitto Devaney won the vote for District 3, against Nick Carter by 10,000 votes. In District 4 Christopher Iannella won by 76% against the other candidates in the district. There were three main candidates in District 5: Eileen Duff, Richard Baker, and Marc Mercier yet Duff won with over 100,000 votes. In District 6 Terrence Kennedy was against Vincent Lawrence Dixon, and Kennedy won with over 200,000 more votes than Dixion. Although Massachusetts is known as a Democratic-leaning state, Republican politician Jennie Caissie won against Paul Deploy by a little over 20,000 votes. In District 8 Mary Hurley won against Mike Franco by 68% against 23.1%.
