= 2018 Armenian local elections =

Local elections were held in Armenia on 11 March, 10 June, 24 June and 21 October 2018.

Yerevan City Council elections were held on 23 September.
