= 2018 Oregon Ballot Measure 102 =

Affordable housing ballot initiative

Measure 102
- Allows local bonds for financing affordable housing with nongovernmental entities. Requires voter approval, annual audits.

Results
Choice	Votes	%
Yes	1,037,922	56.90%
No	786,225	43.10%
Total votes	1,824,147	100.00%
Results by county
Yes
50%-60%
60%-70%
70%-80%
No
50%-60%
60%-70%

Oregon Ballot Measure 102 was a ballot measure passed by voters in the November 6, 2018 general election. If passed, the measure "would allow local governments to issue bonds to pay for affordable housing projects that involve nonprofits or other nongovernmental entities".

The Oregon state legislature voted to put the measure on the ballot for voter approval and it received broad bipartisan support during the election, including from both major party candidates in the 2018 Oregon gubernatorial election, Democrat Kate Brown and then-Republican Knute Buehler. The measure also had the support of vocal opponents of an affordable housing bond that was put before Portland-area voters in the same election. It faced no major organized opposition.

Early results from election night showed that the measure passed easily, and the official results later published by the Oregon Secretary of State showed that the measure passed with 56.90% of the vote.

Vote tallies by county:

County	Yes	Votes	No	Votes	Total
Baker	38.65	3,106	61.35	4,931	8,037
Benton	63.06	27,448	36.94	16,076	43,524
Clackamas	52.62	102,690	47.38	92,451	195,141
Clatsop	53.77	9,656	46.23	8,301	17,957
Columbia	46.41	11,136	53.59	12,862	23,998
Coos	46.99	13,169	53.01	14,854	28,023
Crook	45.50	5,069	54.50	6,074	11,143
Curry	52.39	5,917	47.61	5,377	11,294
Deschutes	58.47	54,689	41.53	38,837	93,526
Douglas	42.31	20,136	57.69	27,463	47,599
Gilliam	46.60	452	53.40	518	970
Grant	40.43	1,504	59.57	2,216	3,720
Harney	38.21	1,309	61.79	2,117	3,426
Hood River	63.17	6,664	36.83	3,885	10,549
Jackson	52.29	52,241	47.71	47,664	99,905
Jefferson	48.15	4,135	51.85	4,453	8,588
Josephine	46.61	18,279	53.39	20,945	39,224
Klamath	45.44	12,612	54.56	15,145	27,757
Lake	38.85	1,324	61.15	2,084	3,408
Lane	57.39	100,187	42.61	74,356	174,543
Lincoln	55.31	13,093	44.69	10,580	23,673
Linn	44.74	23,880	55.26	29,501	53,381
Malheur	44.20	3,879	55.80	4,898	8,777
Marion	52.34	64,103	47.66	58,372	122,475
Morrow	42.06	1,553	57.94	2,139	3,692
Multnomah	71.72	266,514	28.28	105,082	371,596
Polk	51.35	18,782	48.65	17,795	36,577
Sherman	40.11	377	59.89	563	940
Tillamook	53.42	6,862	46.58	5,984	12,846
Umatilla	43.50	10,256	56.50	13,322	23,578
Union	42.42	4,847	57.58	6,580	11,427
Wallowa	46.98	1,850	53.02	2,088	3,938
Wasco	49.09	5,421	50.91	5,623	11,044
Washington	58.18	140,983	41.82	101,337	242,320
Wheeler	43.47	333	56.53	433	766
Yamhill	52.39	23,466	47.61	21,319	44,785
