= 2018 Montana elections =

- November 6, 2018

A general election was held in Montana on November 6, 2018. Montana's Class 1 United States Senate seat and its seat in the United States House of Representatives were up for elections, along with all of the seats in the Montana House of Representatives and half of the seats in the Montana Senate. Various local offices and ballot measures were also up for election. The primary election was held on June 5, 2018.

== Federal ==
=== Congress ===
==== Senate ====
Incumbent Democrat Jon Tester won re-election.

==== House of Representatives ====
Incumbent Republican Greg Gianforte won re-election.

== State ==
=== Legislature ===
==== Senate ====
25 of the 50 seats in the Montana Senate were up for election in 2018.

==== House of Representatives ====
All 100 seats in the Montana House of Representatives were up for election in 2018.

=== Judicial ===
==== Clerk of the Supreme Court ====
Incumbent Democrat Ed Smith did not run for re-election. Republican Bowen Greenwood defeated Democrat Rex Rank.

== Ballot measures ==
=== Legislative Referendum 128 ===
Legislative Referendum 128 "asks Montana voters to continue the existing 6-mill levy to support Montana's public colleges and universities." The projected annual revenue from the 6-mill levy was $20,890,000 for fiscal year 2020 and was estimated to grow to $23,620,000 by fiscal year 2023. The proposal was effective on January 1, 2019 and will terminate January 1, 2029.

The vote to continue the levy was 65% in agreement.

=== Legislative Referendum 129 ===
Legislative Referendum 129 was submitted by the 2017 legislature under Senate Bill No. 352. LR-129 prohibits a person from collecting another voter's ballot, with certain exceptions.

The referendum was passed with 60% of the vote.

=== Initiative 185 ===
Initiative 185 was a law proposed by an initiative petition. It "raises taxes on all tobacco products, amends the definition to include e-cigarettes and vaping products, and dedicates funds" It also "eliminates the sunset date for expanded Medicaid services for certain low-income adults, which otherwise ends June 30, 2019." The additional tax revenues would go to certain health-related programs, including some of the costs for Montana’s current Medicaid program; veterans’ services; smoking prevention and cessation programs; and long-term care services for seniors and people with disabilities.

The initiative failed with a 53% no vote.

=== Initiative 186 ===
Initiative 186 was a law proposed by an initiative petition. It " requires the Department of Environmental Quality to deny a permit for any new hardrock mines in Montana unless the reclamation plan provides clear and convincing evidence that the mine will not require perpetual treatment of water polluted by acid mine drainage or other contaminants."

The initiative failed with a 55% no vote.
