= 2018 Missouri elections =

Missouri elections, 2018
- November 6th, 2018
- Turnout: 58.23%

The 2018 Missouri elections were held on November 6, 2018.

== United States Senate ==
This was one of the most hotly contested Senate elections in the entire country in 2018. Incumbent Democrat Claire McKaskil was holding onto her seat in a state Republican Donald Trump had won by a sizable margin in 2016.

| Source | Ranking | As of |
|---|---|---|
| The Cook Political Report | Tossup | October 26, 2018 |
| CNN | Tossup | November 5, 2018 |
| RealClearPolitics | Tossup | November 5, 2018 |
| Daily Kos | Tossup | November 5, 2018 |
| Fox News | Tossup | November 5, 2018 |
| FiveThirtyEight | Tossup | November 5, 2018 |

United States Senate election in Missouri, 2018
| Party | Candidate | Votes | % | ±% |
|---|---|---|---|---|
| Republican | Josh Hawley | 1,254,927 | 51.38% | +12.27 |
| Democratic | Claire McCaskill (incumbent) | 1,112,935 | 45.57% | −9.24 |
| Independent | Craig O'Dear | 34,398 | 1.41% | N/A |
| Libertarian | Japheth Campbell | 27,316 | 1.12% | −4.95 |
| Green | Jo Crain | 12,706 | 0.52% | N/A |
| Write-in | | 7 | <0.01% | N/A |
| Total votes | | 2,442,289 | 100.00% | N/A |
| Republican gain from Democratic | | | | |

== United States House of Representatives ==
Popular vote
| Republican | 55.03% |
| Democratic | 42.51% |
| Other | 2.46% |

| District | Republican | | Democratic | | Others | | Total | | Result |
| District | Votes | % | Votes | % | Votes | % | Votes | % | Result |
|---|---|---|---|---|---|---|---|---|---|
| District 1 | 45,867 | 16.72% | 219,781 | 80.10% | 8,727 | 3.18% | 274,375 | 100.0% | Democratic hold |
| District 2 | 192,477 | 51.18% | 177,611 | 47.23% | 5,978 | 1.59% | 376,066 | 100.0% | Republican hold |
| District 3 | 211,243 | 65.08% | 106,589 | 32.84% | 6,776 | 2.08% | 324,608 | 100.0% | Republican hold |
| District 4 | 190,138 | 64.82% | 95,968 | 32.72% | 7,210 | 2.46% | 293,316 | 100.0% | Republican hold |
| District 5 | 101,069 | 35.69% | 175,019 | 61.53% | 7,697 | 2.78% | 283,785 | 100.0% | Democratic hold |
| District 6 | 199,796 | 65.42% | 97,660 | 31.98% | 7,953 | 2.60% | 305,409 | 100.0% | Republican hold |
| District 7 | 196,343 | 66.23% | 89,190 | 30.09% | 10,922 | 3.68% | 296,455 | 100.0% | Republican hold |
| District 8 | 194,042 | 73.39% | 66,151 | 25.02% | 4,206 | 1.59% | 264,399 | 100.0% | Republican hold |
| Total | 1,330,975 | 55.03% | 1,027,969 | 42.51% | 59,469 | 2.46% | 2,418,413 | 100.0% | |

== State auditor ==
2018 Missouri State Auditor election
| Party | Candidate | Votes | % | ±% |
|---|---|---|---|---|
| Democratic | Nicole Galloway (incumbent) | 1,209,881 | 50.41% | +50.41% |
| Republican | Saundra McDowell | 1,070,701 | 44.61% | −28.72% |
| Libertarian | Sean O'Toole | 51,304 | 2.14% | −17.58% |
| Constitution | Jacob Luetkemeyer | 50,951 | 2.12% | −4.84% |
| Green | Don Fitz | 17,106 | 0.72% | N/A |
| Independent | Arnie C. AC Dienoff (write-in) | 4 | 0.00% | N/A |
| Total votes | | 2,399,947 | 100.00% | N/A |
| Democratic hold | | | | |

== State senate ==
| District | Republican | | Democratic | | Others | | Total | | Result |
| District | Votes | % | Votes | % | Votes | % | Votes | % | Result |
|---|---|---|---|---|---|---|---|---|---|
| District 2 | 52,145 | 59.69% | 35,219 | 40.31% | - | - | 87,364 | 100.00% | Republican hold |
| District 4 | 16,773 | 22.96% | 56,289 | 77.04% | - | - | 73,062 | 100.00% | Democratic hold |
| District 6 | 52,861 | 73.22% | 17,783 | 24.63% | 1,548 | 2.15% | 72,192 | 100.00% | Republican hold |
| District 8 | 41,094 | 54.69% | 34,052 | 45.31% | - | - | 75,146 | 100.00% | Republican hold |
| District 10 | 48,277 | 70.31% | 20,384 | 29.69% | - | - | 68,661 | 100.00% | Republican hold |
| District 12 | 49,947 | 72.50% | 18,950 | 27.50% | - | - | 68,897 | 100.00% | Republican hold |
| District 14 | - | - | 51,815 | 100.00% | - | - | 51,815 | 100.00% | Democratic hold |
| District 16 | 41,985 | 70.18% | 17,839 | 29.82% | - | - | 59,824 | 100.00% | Republican hold |
| District 18 | 46,225 | 70.30% | 19,528 | 29.70% | - | - | 65,753 | 100.00% | Republican hold |
| District 20 | 62,247 | 73.88% | 22,006 | 26.12% | - | - | 84,253 | 100.00% | Republican hold |
| District 22 | 40,553 | 58.33% | 26,896 | 38.68% | 2,077 | 2.99% | 69,526 | 100.00% | Republican hold |
| District 24 | 30,494 | 37.15% | 49,910 | 60.80% | 1,682 | 2.05% | 82,086 | 100.00% | Democratic hold |
| District 26 | 53,143 | 64.02% | 29,866 | 35.98% | - | - | 83,009 | 100.00% | Republican hold |
| District 28 | 53,659 | 79.18% | 14,113 | 20.82% | - | - | 67,772 | 100.00% | Republican hold |
| District 30 | 34,506 | 53.35% | 30,175 | 46.65% | - | - | 64,681 | 100.00% | Republican hold |
| District 32 | 48,383 | 73.73% | 15,125 | 23.05% | 2,114 | 3.22% | 65,622 | 100.00% | Republican hold |
| District 34 | 38,648 | 52.47% | 35,015 | 47.53% | - | - | 73,663 | 100.00% | Republican hold |
| Total | 710,940 | 58.59% | 494,965 | 40.79% | 7,421 | 0.61% | 1,213,326 | 100.00% | |
