= 2018 Shiga gubernatorial election =

- 24 June 2018
- Turnout: 40.62 ▼9.53
Candidate	Taizo Mikazuki	Manabu Kondo
Party	Independent	JCP
Popular vote	377,132	77,213
Percentage	83.01%	16.99%
Governor before election
Taizo Mikazuki
Independent
Elected Governor
Taizo Mikazuki
Independent

A gubernatorial election was held on 24 June 2018 to elect the next governor of Shiga (滋賀県, Shiga-ken), a prefecture of Japan located in the Kansai region of Honshu island.

== Candidates ==
- Taizo Mikazuki, incumbent since 2014, 47, ex-lawmaker of the DPJ, endorsed by DPFP, LDP, Komeito.
- Manabu Kondo, 68, former Shiga University Vice President, endorsed by JCP.

== Results ==
Shiga gubernatorial election, 2018
Party	Candidate	Votes	%	±%
Democratic Party for the People	Taizo Mikazuki *	377,132	83.01	▲36.68
JCP	Manabu Kondo	77,213	16.99	▲7,26
Turnout		460.642	40,62	▼9.53
Registered electors		1,134,162		
Democratic Party for the People hold		Swing	66.02	
