= 2018 Saga gubernatorial election =

Election for Governor of Saga Prefecture

2011 Saga gubernatorial election
- 16 December 2018
Nominee	Yoshinori Yamaguchi	Masato Imada
Party	Independent	Independent
Popular vote	199,670	36,174
Supported by	LDP, Komeito	JCP
Governor before election
Yoshinori Yamaguchi
Independent
Elected Governor
Yoshinori Yamaguchi
Independent

A gubernatorial election was held on 16 December 2018 to elect the Governor of Saga Prefecture. Yoshinori Yamaguchi was re-elected.

== Candidates ==
- Yoshinori Yamaguchi – incumbent Governor of Saga Prefecture, age 53
- Masato Imada (今田真人, Imada Masato) – party officer (not the journalist of the same name, age 72

== Results ==
2018 Saga gubernational election 2018
Party	Candidate	Votes	%	±%
Independent	Yoshinori Yamaguchi (incumbent)	199,670		
Independent	Masato Imada	36,174		
