= 2018 Wakayama gubernatorial election =

Wakayama Prefecture held a gubernatorial election in November 2018. Incumbent Yoshinobu Nisaka was reelected for a fourth term.

Gubernatorial election 2018: Wakayama
Party	Candidate	Votes	%	±%
Independent, supported by LDP and Komeito	Yoshinobu Nisaka (incumbent)	246,303	80.00%	
Independent, supported by the JCP	Masayoshi Hatanaka	61,604	20.00%	
