= 2018 Ishikawa gubernatorial election =

Japanese gubernatorial election

- 11 March 2018
- Turnout: 39.07% (▼5.78pp)
Candidate	Masanori Tanimoto	Emi Kokura
Party	Independent	Independent
Popular vote	288,531	72,414
Percentage	79.94%	20.06%
Supported by	LDP, Komeito, DP, SDP	CDP, JCP,
governor before election
Masanori Tanimoto
Independent
Elected governor
Masanori Tanimoto
Independent

A gubernatorial election was held on 11 March 2018 to elect the next governor of Ishikawa (石川県, Ishikawa-ken), a prefecture of Japan located in the Chūbu region on Honshu island.

== Candidates ==
- Masanori Tanimoto, elected since 1994 was endorsed by SDP, LDP and Komeito.
- Emi Kokura, former labor union worker, JCP.

== Results ==
Ishikawa gubernatorial 2019
Party	Candidate	Votes	%	±%
Independent	Masanori Tanimoto *	288,531	79.94	n/a
Independent	Emi Kokura	72,414	20.06	n/a
Turnout			39.07	−n/a
Registered electors				
Independent hold		Swing		
