= 2018 Gambian local elections =

- 12 April 2018
- 120 Regional Chairmen
Party	Leader	Vote %	Seats	+/–
UDP	Ousainou Darboe		62	
GDC	Mama Kandeh		25	
APRC	Fabakary Jatta		16	
PDOIS	Halifa Sallahe		7	
NRP	Hamat Bah		5	
Gambia Moral Congress	Mai Ahmad Fatty		1	
PPP	Kebba E. Jallow		1	
Independent	-		3	
This lists parties that won seats. See the complete results below.

Local elections were held in The Gambia on 12 April 2018. The elections saw a victory for the United Democratic Party. Voter turnout was low, at 29 percent of eligible voters participating. Gambian citizens also criticized the slow release of election results.
