= 2022 Ohio Issue 2 =

Issue 2
- November 8, 2022
- Citizenship Voting Requirement Amendment

Results
Choice	Votes	%
Yes	3,099,868	76.90%
No	931,205	23.10%
Valid votes	4,031,073	95.95%
Invalid or blank votes	170,295	4.05%
Total votes	4,201,368	100.00%
Registered voters/turnout	8,029,950	52.32%

Yes
90–100%
80–90%
70–80%
60–70%
50–60%
No
90–100%
80–90%
70–80%
60–70%
50–60%
Other
Tie
No votes

Issue 2, also known as the Citizenship Voting Requirement Amendment, was a ballot measure approved by voters in Ohio during the 2022 United States elections. It amended the Ohio Constitution to require that only citizens who met voting criteria are allowed to vote in state or local elections.

Supporters of the measure claimed it protected "the integrity of elections," and would make elections more efficient administratively. Opponents claimed it "enhanced democracy," that it perpetuated election fraud claims.

The ballot measure passed with 76.90% of the vote.

== Background ==
Before the election, the Ohio Constitution stated that regardless of citizenship, residents who were 18 years or older and had been registered to vote for 30 days could vote at all elections.

In 2019, the Ohio town of Yellow Springs voted under a similar referendum to allow non-citizens to vote. However, Ohio Secretary of State Frank LaRose criticized the result, calling it unconstitutional. This led to Republican lawmakers tabling the ballot measure. The ballot measure required a simple majority to pass.

According to the 2020 United States census, around 2% of Ohio's resident population were non-citizens.

== Campaign ==
=== Support and Opposition ===
Ohio Secretary of State Frank LaRose supported the measure, saying that giving non-citizens voting rights "undermine the value of what it means to be American."

Democratic state representative Michael J. Skindell claimed that non-citizens contribute to society, and that "they have a right to have a voice, and we should allow that." Additionally, some opponents have argued that the ballot measure supported claims of voter fraud.

=== Polling ===
Pre-election polling suggested that Issue 2 was likely to pass by a considerable margin.

== Text ==
The ballot measure altered Section 1 of Article V, Section 3 of Article X, and Section 3 of Article XVIII of the Ohio Constitution.

The proposal appeared on the ballot as follows:

- Require that only a citizen of the United States, who is at least 18 years of age and who has been a legal resident and registered voter for at least 30 days, can vote at any state or local election held in this state.
- Prohibit local governments from allowing a person to vote in local elections if they are not legally qualified to vote in state elections.

If passed, the amendment will be effective immediately.

== Results ==
Issue 2
Choice	Votes	%
For	3,099,868	76.90
Against	931,205	23.10
Total	4,031,073	100.00
Valid votes	4,031,073	95.95
Invalid/blank votes	170,295	4.05
Total votes	4,201,368	100.00
Registered voters/turnout	8,029,950	52.32
Source: Ohio Secretary of State
