= List of by-elections to the 17th National Assembly of France =

By-elections to the French National Assembly are held within three months after the invalidation of the election or resignation of a deputy. These by-elections were held during the 17th legislature of the French Fifth Republic.

== List ==
#	Outgoing MP	Party	End date of mandate	Constituency	Dates of the new election	Elected or re-elected MP	Party	Reason
1	Flavien Termet	RN	5 October 2024	Ardennes's 1st constituency	1 and 8 December 2024	Lionel Vuibert	Independent	Resignation for health reasons
2	Hugo Prevost	LFI	15 October 2024	Isère's 1st constituency	12 and 19 January 2025	Camille Galliard-Minier	RE	Resignation after sexual assault allegations
3	Stéphane Séjourné	RE	30 November 2024	Hauts-de-Seine's 9th constituency	2 and 9 February 2025	Élisabeth de Maistre	LR	Nominated to the European Commission
4	Marie-Christine Dalloz	LR	13 February 2025	Jura's 2nd constituency	30 March and 6 April 2025	Marie-Christine Dalloz	LR	Cancellation following the presence of a candidate under guardianship in the second round
5	Arnaud Sanvert	RN	7 March 2025	Saône-et-Loire's 5th constituency	18 and 25 May 2025	Sébastien Martin	LR	Cancellation due to irregularities in the first round
6	Jean Laussucq	RE	11 July 2025	Paris's 2nd constituency	21 and 28 September 2025	Michel Barnier	LR	Cancellation due to accounting irregularities during his campaign and declared ineligible
7	Brigitte Barèges	UDR	11 July 2025	Tarn-et-Garonne's 1st constituency	5 and 12 October 2025	Pierre-Henri Carbonnel	UDR	Cancellation due to accounting irregularities during her campaign and declared ineligible
8	Stéphane Vojetta	Independent	11 July 2025	Fifth French legislative constituency for citizens abroad	28 September and 12 October 2025	Nathalie Coggia	RE	Cancellation due to accounting irregularities during his campaign and declared ineligible
9	Stéphanie Rist	RE	10 October 2025	Loiret's 1st constituency	18 and 25 January 2026	Stéphanie Rist	RE	Re-elected after Stéphane Chouin resigned shortly to remain as a mayor of Saint-Hilaire-Saint-Mesmin
10	Christelle Petex-Levet	LR	6 November 2025	Haute-Savoie's 3rd constituency	25 January and 1 February 2026	Antoine Valentin	UDR	Resignation for personal reasons

== See also ==
- List of by-elections to the National Assembly (France)
