= Results of the 2024 French legislative election in Saône-et-Loire =

Following the first round of the 2024 French legislative election on 30 June 2024, runoff elections in each constituency where no candidate received a vote share greater than 50 percent were scheduled for 7 July. Candidates permitted to stand in the runoff elections needed to either come in first or second place in the first round or achieve more than 12.5 percent of the votes of the entire electorate (as opposed to 12.5 percent of the vote share due to low turnout).

== Saône-et-Loire ==
=== 1st constituency ===
Candidate	Party or alliance		First round		Second round	
Candidate	Party or alliance		Votes	%	Votes	%
Rachel Drevet	National Rally		17,602	34.65	19,636	39.44
Benjamin Dirx	Ensemble	Renaissance	15,546	30.60	30,145	60.56
Jean-Luc Delpeuch	New Popular Front	The Ecologists	14,017	27.59		
Jean-Philippe Belville	The Republicans		2,368	4.66		
Jean-Armand Roy	Sovereigntist right	Debout la France	836	1.65		
Christophe Springaux	Far-left	Lutte Ouvrière	429	0.84		
Total			50,798	100.00	49,781	100.00
Valid votes			50,798	97.36	49,781	94.98
Invalid votes			444	0.85	579	1.10
Blank votes			934	1.79	2,051	3.91
Total votes			52,176	100.00	52,411	100.00
Registered voters/turnout			75,260	69.33	75,273	69.63

=== 2nd constituency ===
Candidate	Party or alliance		First round		Second round	
Candidate	Party or alliance		Votes	%	Votes	%
Olivier Damien	National Rally		19,738	37.85	21,360	41.61
Josiane Corneloup	The Republicans		17,511	33.58	29,977	58.39
Sébastien Gautheron	New Popular Front	Communist Party	9,124	17.50		
Raymond Zekpa	Ensemble	Renaissance	5,094	9.77		
Patrick Berthelot	Far-left	Lutte Ouvrière	677	1.30		
Total			52,144	100.00	51,337	100.00
Valid votes			52,144	97.34	51,337	95.31
Invalid votes			532	0.99	710	1.32
Blank votes			894	1.67	1,816	3.37
Total votes			53,570	100.00	53,863	100.00
Registered voters/turnout			76,621	69.92	76,630	70.29

=== 3rd constituency ===
Candidate	Party or alliance		First round		Second round	
Candidate	Party or alliance		Votes	%	Votes	%
Aurélien Dutremble	National Rally		23,130	42.67	26,523	50.06
Rémy Rebeyrotte	Ensemble	Renaissance	13,606	25.10	26,458	49.94
Richard Beninger	New Popular Front	La France Insoumise	10,375	19.14		
Charles Landre	Miscellaneous right	Independent	5,384	9.93		
France Robert	Sovereigntist right	Debout la France	783	1.44		
Julie Lucotte	Far-left	Lutte Ouvrière	730	1.35		
José Antonio Granado	Independent		193	0.36		
Total			54,201	100.00	52,981	100.00
Valid votes			54,201	96.50	52,981	93.80
Invalid votes			733	1.31	1,061	1.88
Blank votes			1,232	2.19	2,442	4.32
Total votes			56,166	100.00	56,484	100.00
Registered voters/turnout			80,901	69.43	80,879	69.84

=== 4th constituency ===
Candidate	Party or alliance		First round		Second round	
Candidate	Party or alliance		Votes	%	Votes	%
Eric Michoux	Union of the far right	The Republicans	24,275	44.34	29,272	54.66
Cécile Untermaier	New Popular Front	Socialist Party	16,403	29.96	24,283	45.34
Anthony Vadot	The Republicans		12,222	22.33		
Claude Couratier	Far-left	Lutte Ouvrière	1,115	2.04		
Véronique Bellest	Sovereigntist right	Debout la France	728	1.33		
Total			54,743	100.00	53,555	100.00
Valid votes			54,743	96.67	53,555	93.30
Invalid votes			592	1.05	998	1.74
Blank votes			1,295	2.29	2,846	4.96
Total votes			56,630	100.00	57,399	100.00
Registered voters/turnout			82,625	68.54	82,638	69.46

=== 5th constituency ===
Candidate	Party or alliance		First round		Second round	
Candidate	Party or alliance		Votes	%	Votes	%
Arnaud Sanvert	National Rally		19,807	35.12	22,657	40.57
Fatima Kouriche	New Popular Front	La France Insoumise	13,130	23.28	17,591	31.50
Louis Margueritte	Ensemble	Renaissance	11,699	20.74		
Gilles Platret	Miscellaneous right	Independent	10,746	19.05	15,593	27.92
Pascal Dufraigne	Far-left	Lutte Ouvrière	888	1.57		
Alain Cadiot	Miscellaneous right	Independent	125	0.22		
Total			56,395	100.00	55,841	100.00
Valid votes			56,395	97.38	55,841	95.28
Invalid votes			565	0.98	748	1.28
Blank votes			950	1.64	2,017	3.44
Total votes			57,910	100.00	58,606	100.00
Registered voters/turnout			85,943	67.38	85,972	68.17
