= Results of the 2024 French legislative election in Tarn-et-Garonne =

Following the first round of the 2024 French legislative election on 30 June 2024, runoff elections in each constituency where no candidate received a vote share greater than 50 percent were scheduled for 7 July. Candidates permitted to stand in the runoff elections needed to either come in first or second place in the first round or achieve more than 12.5 percent of the votes of the entire electorate (as opposed to 12.5 percent of the vote share due to low turnout).

== Tarn-et-Garonne ==
=== 1st constituency ===
Candidate	Party or alliance		First round		Second round	
Candidate	Party or alliance		Votes	%	Votes	%
Brigitte Barèges	Union of the far right	The Republicans	27,772	43.93	32,394	51.25
Valérie Rabault	New Popular Front	Socialist Party	23,271	36.81	30,813	48.75
Catherine Simonin-Benazet	Ensemble	Renaissance	9,791	15.49		
Richard Blanco	Far-left	Lutte Ouvrière	1,178	1.86		
Jean-François Grilhault des Fontaines	Independent		769	1.22		
Alain Bru	Miscellaneous centre	Independent	439	0.69		
Total			63,220	100.00	63,207	100.00
Valid votes			63,220	95.62	63,207	94.66
Invalid votes			878	1.33	1,095	1.64
Blank votes			2,020	3.06	2,468	3.70
Total votes			66,118	100.00	66,770	100.00
Registered voters/turnout			93,424	70.77	93,423	71.47

=== 2nd constituency ===
Candidate	Party or alliance		First round		Second round	
Candidate	Party or alliance		Votes	%	Votes	%
Marine Hamelet	National Rally		32,578	49.17	37,015	61.51
Claudie Chrétien	New Popular Front	La France Insoumise	12,286	18.54	23,166	38.49
Jules Duffaut	Ensemble	Horizons	10,335	15.60		
Anne Ius	Miscellaneous left	Radical Party of the Left	9,952	15.02		
Françoise Ratsimba	Far-left	Lutte Ouvrière	791	1.19		
Claire Aymes	Independent		310	0.47		
Total			66,252	100.00	60,181	100.00
Valid votes			66,252	96.57	60,181	88.37
Invalid votes			811	1.18	2,265	3.33
Blank votes			1,545	2.25	5,655	8.30
Total votes			68,608	100.00	68,101	100.00
Registered voters/turnout			97,194	70.59	97,199	70.06
