= 2018 French residents overseas' 5th constituency by-election =

French residents overseas' 5th constituency, 2018
← 2017	8 April 2018 (first round); 22 April 2018 (second round)	2022 →
- Turnout: 7.87% ▼8.07% (first round); 7.97% ▼5.57% (first round)

Nominee	Samantha Cazebonne	François Ralle-Andreoli	Raphaël Chambat
Party	LREM	LFI	LR
1st round %	2,398; 35.15% ▼15.21%	1,941; 28.45% ▲12.93%	952; 13.95% ▼1.15%
2nd round %	3,623; 53.96% ▼12.25%	3,091; 46.04% ▲12.25%	Eliminated
Nominee	Jean-Laurent Poitevin	Mehdi Benlahcen
Party	DVD	PS
1st round %	511; 7.49% ▲7.49%	510; 7.47% ▼0.66%
2nd round %	Eliminated	Eliminated
Deputy before election
Samantha Cazebonne
LREM
Elected deputy
Samantha Cazebonne
LREM

A by-election was held in the fifth constituency for French residents overseas on 8 April 2018, with a second round on 22 April as no candidate secured a majority of votes in the first round. The by-election was called after the Constitutional Council invalidated the election of Samantha Cazebonne, candidate of La République En Marche! in the June 2017 legislative elections, on 2 February 2018. Cazebonne was re-elected in the second round on 22 April 2018, albeit with a reduced margin compared to June 2017.

== Background ==
In the first round of the 2017 legislative elections on 4 June, La République En Marche! candidate Samantha Cazebonne obtained a majority of votes in the first round in the fifth constituency for French residents overseas (representing French nationals residing in Spain, Portugal, Andorra, and Monaco). However, she was not immediately elected because of low turnout, with candidates who secure a majority in the first round required to also obtain the votes of at least 25% of registered voters in order to avoid a second round. François Ralle-Andreoli, candidate of La France Insoumise (FI), obtained 15.52% of the vote and advanced to the second round, while Laurence Sailliet of The Republicans (LR), with 15.11%, was eliminated by 60 votes.

After the election, Laurence Sailliet filed an appeal with the Constitutional Council. Sailliet contended that Cazebonne violated article L. 52-8 of the electoral code, which states that individuals are prohibited from supporting the campaign of a candidate by supplying "goods, services or other direct or indirect advantages at prices lower than those normally practised", and was therefore ineligible for election under article L.O. 136–1. Sailliet claimed that Cazebonne was present at a meeting of business leaders over a meal at a restaurant in Barcelona on 13 June that was financed by the France-Spain Chamber of Commerce and Industry. However, the records Cazebonne submitted to the National Commission for Campaign Accounts and Political Financing (CNCCFP) showed that the meal was paid for by each of its participants, not the France-Spain Chamber of Commerce and Industry, and this complaint was therefore dismissed.

Although the complaint concerning the eligibility of Cazebonne was rejected, Sailliet also raised concerns about the administration of the election. Due to an error, voting materials were not mailed to 94 voters before the first round as required under article R. 176-4 of the electoral code; of these 94 voters, 56 did not vote despite having the right to do so. As a result of delays in the delivery of voting materials or omissions in those sent, many voters were unable to submit mail-in ballots during both rounds of voting. Although the number of voters affected by these issues was uncertain, the degree of these issues was attested to by a substantial number of voters who failed to vote, as confirmed by electoral rolls. In addition, under article L. 49 of the electoral code, diffusion of electoral messages is prohibited during the election silence. Ralle-Andreoli, who emailed a message at 20:03 local time on 3 June 2017 to some voters registered on electoral rolls within the constituency, violated this article. Given these issues and the small margin separating the second- and third-placed candidates in the first round, the constitutional council annulled the result of the election, triggering a by-election within three months.

On 21 February 2018, the first round of the by-election was scheduled for 8 April 2018, with a second round on 22 April should no candidate secure a majority of votes in the first round.

== 2017 election result ==
Candidate	Party	First round		Second round	
Candidate	Party	Votes	%	Votes	%
Samantha Cazebonne	LREM	7,274	50.36	7,828	66.21
François Ralle-Andreoli	LFI	2,242	15.52	3,995	33.79
Laurence Sailliet	LR	2,182	15.11		
Gabrielle Siry	PS	1,175	8.13		
Natacha Barral	FN	818	5.66		
Hubert Patural	DVD	206	1.43		
Alexis Boudaud-Anduaga	ECO	126	0.87		
Olivia Tholance	UPR	113	0.78		
Éric Morgeau	EXD	108	0.75		
Benjamin Leduc	PCD	85	0.59		
Caroline Guébel	DIV	59	0.41		
Venise Jonnet	DIV	51	0.35		
Olivier Hennebelle	PA	6	0.04		
Chloé Teyssou	DVD	0	0.00		
Votes		14,445	100.00	11,823	100.00
Valid votes		14,445	99.18	11,823	95.66
Blank votes		71	0.49	417	3.37
Null votes		48	0.33	120	0.97
Turnout		14,564	15.94	12,360	13.54
Abstentions		76,810	84.06	78,931	86.46
Registered voters		91,374		91,291	
Source: Ministry of the Interior

== 2018 by-election result ==
Candidate	Party	First round			Second round		
Candidate	Party	Votes	%	+/–	Votes	%	+/–
Samantha Cazebonne	LREM	2,398	35.15	–15.21	3,623	53.96	–12.25
François Ralle-Andreoli	LFI	1,941	28.45	+12.93	3,091	46.04	+12.25
Raphaël Chambat	LR	952	13.95	–1.15			
Jean-Laurent Poitevin	DVD	511	7.49	+7.49			
Mehdi Benlahcen	PS	510	7.47	–0.66			
Ludovic Lemoues	EXD	275	4.03	+3.28			
Yohann Castro	DVD	122	1.79	+1.79			
Michel Hunault	DVD	63	0.92	+0.92			
Samir Sahraoui	DIV	51	0.75	+0.75			
Votes		6,823	100.00	–	6,714	100.00	–
Valid votes		6,823	98.03	–1.15	6,714	95.26	–0.39
Blank votes		87	1.25	+0.76	203	2.88	–0.49
Null votes		50	0.72	+0.39	131	1.86	+0.89
Turnout		6,960	7.87	–8.07	7,048	7.97	–5.57
Abstentions		81,495	92.13	+8.07	81,360	92.03	+5.57
Registered voters		88,455			88,408		
Source: Ministère de l’Europe et des Affaires étrangères (first round), (second round)
