= Élisabeth de Maistre =

French politician (born 1975)

Member of the National Assembly for Hauts-de-Seine's 9th constituency
- Incumbent
- Assumed office 10 February 2025
- Preceded by: Stéphane Séjourné

Personal details
- Born: Élisabeth Vallery-Radot; 7 October 1975 (age 50) Paris, France
- Party: The Republicans
- Occupation: Lawyer
- Website: elisabethdemaistre.fr

Élisabeth de Maistre (French pronunciation: [elizabɛt də mɛstʁ]; née Vallery-Radot, 7 October 1975) is a French politician and lawyer who has represented the 9th constituency of the Hauts-de-Seine department in the National Assembly since a by-election in 2025. A member of The Republicans (LR), she succeeded former Foreign Minister Stéphane Séjourné, who was appointed to the European Commission. She first became involved in local politics with her election as a municipal councillor of Boulogne-Billancourt in 2014 before becoming a deputy mayor in 2020.

== Early life and education ==
Élisabeth de Maistre was born in 1975. Details about her early life and education are not widely documented, but her career in law indicates a background in legal studies. After leaving the legal profession, she became a parliamentary assistant to Christine Lavarde.

== Political career ==
De Maistre was first elected a municipal councillor of Boulogne-Billancourt in 2014 on the Union for a Popular Movement (renamed The Republicans the following year) list led by Mayor Pierre-Christophe Baguet. She became a deputy mayor in 2020 under Baguet.

In January 2025, she was nominated by The Republicans as the party's candidate in the February 2025 by-election in the 9th constituency of Hauts-de-Seine, triggered by the resignation of Stéphane Séjourné, who became a European Commissioner. De Maistre had been Séjourné's substitute since 2024. During the first round of the by-election, she placed first with 38.1% of the vote, leading to her advancement to the second round where she defeated Antoine de Jerphanion of the Horizons party with 59.6% of the vote. Her candidacy was supported by the Democratic Movement and Union of Democrats and Independents, local political figures, including Mayor Baguet, as well as notable members of The Republicans like Bruno Retailleau, the Minister of the Interior.
