= Tarn-et-Garonne's 1st constituency =

Constituency of the National Assembly of France

1st constituency of Tarn-et-Garonne
- inline Constituency of the National Assembly of France

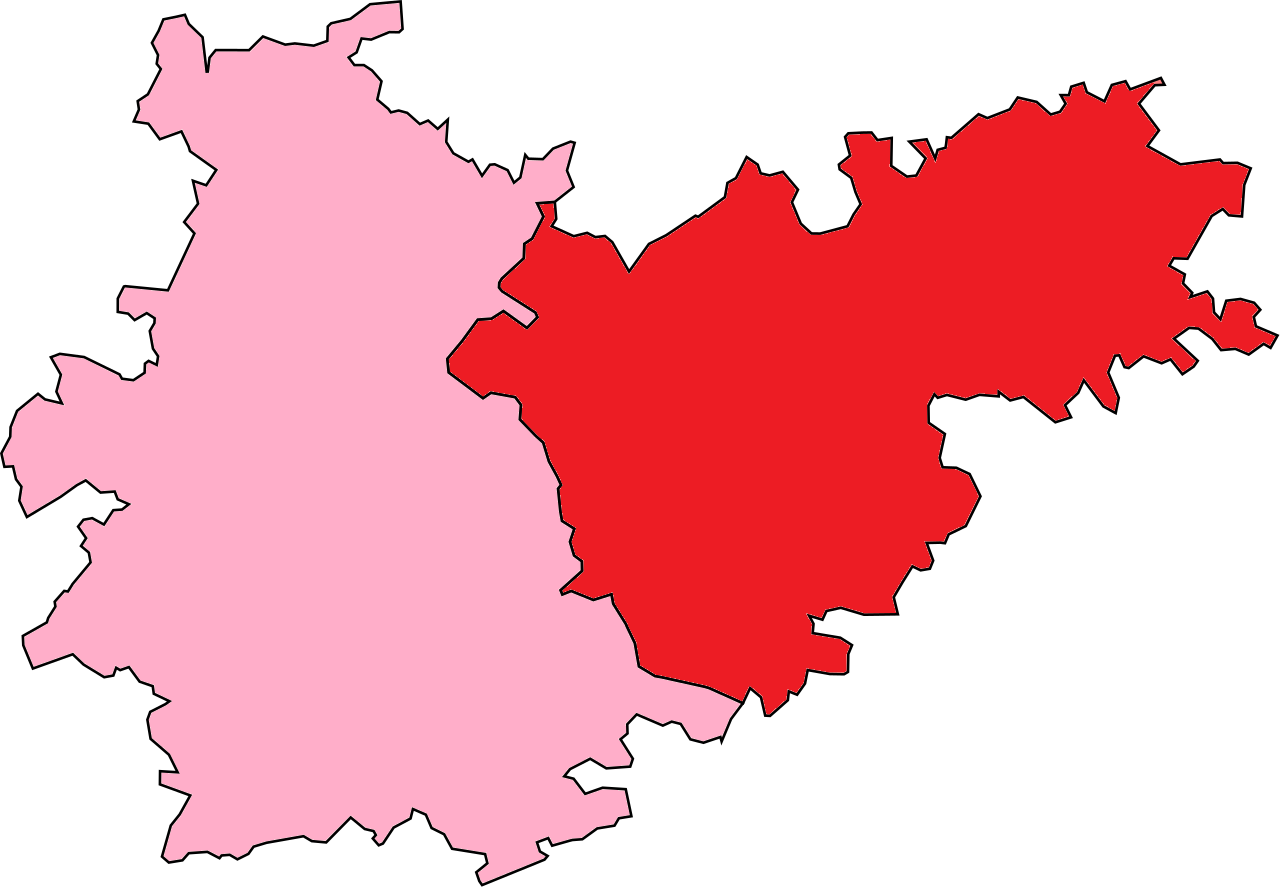
- Tarn-et-Garonne's 1st Constituency shown within the Tarn-et-Garonne
- Deputy: Pierre-Henri Carbonnel; LR (UXD)
- Department: Tarn-et-Garonne
- Cantons: Caussade, Caylus, Lafrançaise, Molières, Monclar-de-Quercy, Montauban I, Montauban II, Montauban III, Montauban IV, Montauban V, Montauban VI, Montpezat-de-Quercy, Nègrepelisse, Saint-Antonin-Noble-Val, Villebrumier
- Registered voters: 89,975

The 1st constituency of the Tarn-et-Garonne (French: Première circonscription de Tarn-et-Garonne) is a French legislative constituency in Tarn-et-Garonne département.

== Description ==
The 1st constituency of Tarn-et-Garonne is one of two in the department. This constituency covers its eastern half and includes the city of Montauban.

Over recent decades the political allegiance of this seats voters has fluctuated between left and right, in 2017 it was a rare exception to the national trend in that it reelected a Socialist Party incumbent in the face of opposition from En Marche!.

== Deputies ==
Election	Member	Party
1988	Hubert Gouze	PS
1993	Jean-Pierre Cave	UDF
1997	Roland Garrigues	PS
2002	Brigitte Barèges	UMP
2007	Brigitte Barèges	UMP
2012	Valérie Rabault	PS
2017	Valérie Rabault	PS
2022	Valérie Rabault	PS
2024	Brigitte Barèges	LR (UXD)
2025	Pierre-Henri Carbonnel	LR (UXD)

== Election results ==
=== 2024 ===
Candidate	Party	Alliance	First round		Second round	
Candidate	Party	Alliance	Votes	%	Votes	%
Brigitte Barèges	LR	UXD	27,772	43.93	32,394	51.25
Valérie Rabault	PS	NFP	23,271	36.81	30,813	48.75
Catherine Simonin-Benazet	REN	Ensemble	9,791	15.49		
Richard Blanco	LO		1,178	1.86		
Jean-François Grilhault des Fontaines	DIV		769	1.22		
Alain Bru	DIV	DVC	439	0.69		
Valid votes			63,220	95.62	63,207	94.66
Blank votes			2,020	3.06	2,468	3.70
Null votes			878	1.33	1,095	1.64
Turnout			66.118	70.77	66,770	71.47
Abstentions			27,306	29.23	26,653	28.53
Registered voters			93,424		93,423	
Result			LR GAIN FROM PS			

=== 2022 ===
Legislative Election 2022: Tarn-et-Garonne's 1st constituency
Party	Candidate	Votes	%	±%
PS (NUPÉS)	Valérie Rabault	15,763	33.33	-1.48
RN	Pierre Poma	10,610	22.44	+5.33
LREM (Ensemble)	Catherine Simonin	8,196	17.38	−11.77
LR (UDC)	Claude Vigouroux	4,378	9.26	−6.51
DVG	Ghislain Descazeaux	3,774	7.98	N/A
REC	Lux Francez-Charlot	2,195	4.64	N/A
Others	N/A	2,371	5.01	
Turnout		47,287	52.09	−0.62
2nd round result
PS (NUPÉS)	Valérie Rabault	25,327	58.29	+3.27
RN	Pierre Poma	18,121	41.71	N/A
Turnout		43,448	50.96	+10.45
PS hold				

=== 2017 ===
Legislative Election 2017: Tarn-et-Garonne's 1st constituency
Party	Candidate	Votes	%	±%
LREM	Pierre Mardegan	13,801	29.10	
PS	Valérie Rabault	8,891	18.75	
FN	Thierry Viallon	8,113	17.11	
LR	Thierry Deville	7,480	15.77	
LFI	Marie Nadal	5,348	11.28	
PCF	Rodolphe Portoles	1,155	2.44	
EELV	Guillaume Arnaud	1,112	2.34	
Others	N/A	1,529		
Turnout		47,429	52.71	
2nd round result
PS	Valérie Rabault	20,053	55.02	
LREM	Pierre Mardegan	16,393	44.98	
Turnout		36,446	40.51	
PS hold				

=== 2012 ===
Legislative Election 2012: Tarn-et-Garonne's 1st constituency
Party	Candidate	Votes	%	±%
PS	Valérie Rabault	20,657	38.20	
UMP	Brigitte Barèges	17,716	32.76	
FN	Thierry Viallon	7,814	14.45	
FG	Marie-Claude Bouyssi	3,333	6.16	
EELV	Jean-Jacques Boyer	1,512	2.80	
Others	N/A	3,042		
Turnout		54,074	62.79	
2nd round result
PS	Valérie Rabault	29,270	54.09	
UMP	Brigitte Barèges	24,841	45.91	
Turnout		54,111	62.84	
PS hold				

=== 2007 ===
Legislative Election 2007: Tarn-et-Garonne's 1st constituency
Party	Candidate	Votes	%	±%
UMP	Brigitte Barèges	22,449	42.07	
PS	Roland Garrigues	16,635	31.18	
MoDem	Jacques Larroque	3,433	6.43	
FN	Delphine Tantot	2,281	4.27	
LV	Annie Bonnefont	2,200	4.12	
PCF	Hugues Bauchy	1,595	2.99	
Far left	Robert Romanin	1,503	2.82	
CPNT	Christelle Gibert	1,140	2.14	
Others	N/A	2,123		
Turnout		54,603	66.56	
2nd round result
UMP	Brigitte Barèges	27,222	50.81	
PS	Roland Garrigues	26,357	49.19	
Turnout		55,853	68.09	
UMP hold				

=== 2002 ===
Legislative Election 2002: Tarn-et-Garonne's 1st constituency
Party	Candidate	Votes	%	±%
UMP	Brigitte Barèges	20,920	38.95	
PS	Roland Garrigues	17,371	32.35	
FN	Liliane Garcia	6,461	12.03	
CPNT	Thierry Cabanes	1,930	3.59	
PR	Jean-Louis Pujol	1,395	2.60	
LV	Philippe Debaigt	1,373	2.56	
PCF	Joelle Greder	1,193	2.22	
Others	N/A	3,060		
Turnout		55,132	72.44	
2nd round result
UMP	Brigitte Barèges	27,774	54.15	
PS	Roland Garrigues	23,515	45.85	
Turnout		53,876	70.80	
UMP gain from PS				

=== 1997 ===
Legislative Election 1997: Tarn-et-Garonne's 1st constituency
Party	Candidate	Votes	%	±%
PS	Roland Garrigues	16,876	33.05	
UDF	Jean-Pierre Cave	16,653	32.61	
FN	Bernard Vincent	7,436	14.56	
PCF	Joëlle Greder	3,388	6.63	
LV	Philippe Debaigt	2,488	4.87	
DVD	Huguette Burrgraf	1,214	2.38	
LO	Jean-Claude Espinosa	1,037	2.03	
Others	N/A	1,971		
Turnout		53,972	72.74	
2nd round result
PS	Roland Garrigues	28,391	52.08	
UDF	Jean-Pierre Cave	26,127	47.92	
Turnout		57,981	78.16	
PS gain from UDF				
