= Samantha Cazebonne =

French politician (born 1971)

Senator for French citizens living abroad
- Incumbent
- Assumed office 1 October 2021

Member of the National Assembly for the 5th constituency for French citizens living abroad
- In office 23 April 2018 – 1 October 2021
- Preceded by: Herself
- Succeeded by: Stéphane Vojetta
- In office 21 June 2017 – 2 February 2018
- Preceded by: Arnaud Leroy
- Succeeded by: Herself

Personal details
- Born: 10 August 1971 (age 54) La Rochelle, France
- Party: Renaissance

Samantha Cazebonne (French pronunciation: [samɑ̃ta kazbɔn]; born 10 August 1971) is a French politician who has served as a Senator for French citizens living abroad since 2021. A member of Renaissance (RE, formerly La République En Marche!), she sits with the Rally of Democrats, Progressive and Independent group in the Senate. Cazebonne previously represented the fifth constituency for French citizens living abroad in the National Assembly, which includes Spain, Portugal, Monaco and Andorra, from 2017 to 2021, with a brief interruption in 2018 after her election was nullified by the Constitutional Council, which ordered a re-run.

== Political career ==
Cazebonne served as the deputy from 19 June 2017 until 2 February 2018, when her election in June 2017 was annulled by the Constitutional Council, forcing a by-election, at which she was elected again.

In parliament, Cazebonne served as member of the Committee on Foreign Affairs. In addition to her committee assignments, she chaired the French-Portuguese Parliamentary Friendship Group.

Cazebonne was elected in the 2020 French Senate election. In the Senate, she has been serving on the Committee on Cultural Affairs, Education, Communication and Sports.

== Political positions ==
In July 2019, Cazebonne voted in favour of the French ratification of the European Union's Comprehensive Economic and Trade Agreement (CETA) with Canada.

== Other activities ==
- Agency for French Education Abroad (AEFE), Member of the Board of Directors
