= Thierry Solère =

French politician (born 1971)

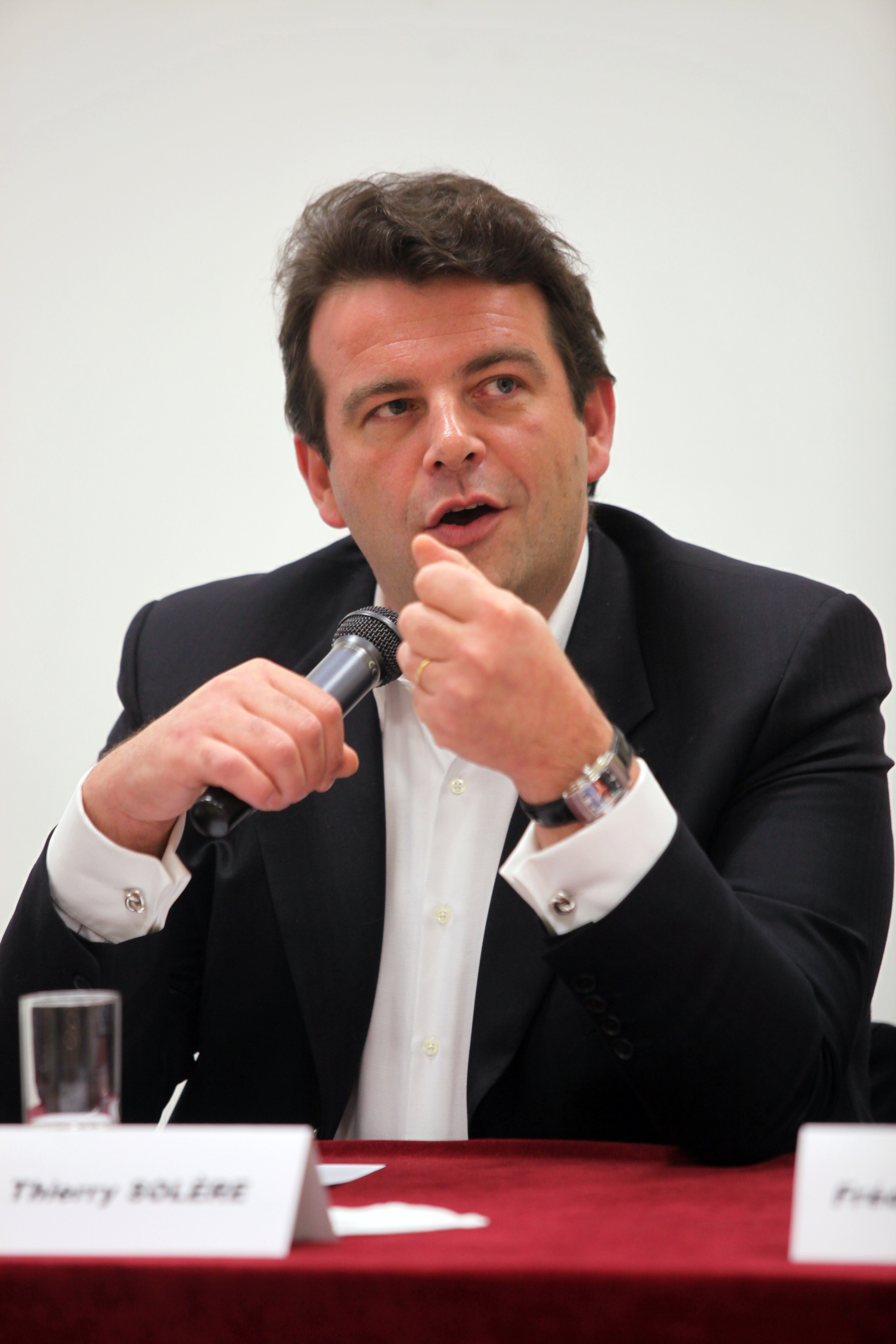

Member of the National Assembly for Hauts-de-Seine's 9th constituency
- In office 20 June 2012 – 2022
- Preceded by: Pierre-Christophe Baguet
- Succeeded by: Emmanuel Pellerin

Personal details
- Born: 17 August 1971 (age 55) Nantes, France
- Party: LREM (since 2017)
- Other political affiliations: MP (2002–2015); LR (2015–2017)

Thierry Solère (born 17 August 1971) is a French politician who has served as the member of the National Assembly for the 9th constituency of Hauts-de-Seine from 2012 to 2022. He was a member of The Republicans (LR) until 2017, when he joined La République En Marche! (LREM).

== Political career ==
Thierry Solère served as First Deputy Mayor of Boulogne-Billancourt, the most populous commune in Hauts-de-Seine, from 2008 to 2011 under Mayor Pierre-Christophe Baguet, whom he succeeded in Parliament. He also served as a departmental councillor of Hauts-de-Seine from 2004 to 2015 and regional councillor of Île-de-France from 2015 to 2021.

Ahead of the 2017 presidential election, Solère served as chief spokesman of candidate François Fillon's campaign before his resignation amid the Fillon affair. He remained a member of The Republicans but joined the UDI and Independents group in Parliament. Since the 2017 legislative election, Solère has served on the Defence Committee. In addition to his committee assignments, he is a member of the French-Israeli Parliamentary Friendship Group.

From June 2017 until January 2018, Solère briefly served as a parliamentary quaestor; he was therefore part of the Bureau of the National Assembly in the 15th legislature of the Fifth Republic, under the leadership of President François de Rugy. He resigned from this position after he joined LREM in November 2017. He was succeeded by Éric Ciotti.

After Gilles Boyer left national politics to run in the 2019 European Parliament election, news media reported that Solère took his place as Prime Minister Édouard Philippe's "new (unofficial) liaison officer within the majority" and is "in direct contact with Philippe Grangeon, Emmanuel Macron's special adviser".

Shortly before the 2022 legislative elections, Solère announced that he would not run for re-election and instead endorsed his fellow LREM colleague Emmanuel Pellerin.

== Political positions ==
In response to France's anti-terrorism legislation allowing mass surveillance of suspected terrorists following the January 2015 Île-de-France attacks, Solère and Philippe Juvin sent a joint letter to President of the European Commission Jean-Claude Juncker warning that, without proper safeguards, the new intelligence measures would violate the Charter of Fundamental Rights of the European Union.

Ahead of the 2017 The Republicans leadership election, Solère publicly opposed Laurent Wauquiez, warning that he would be the right's "grave-digger" and criticising him for refusing to call supporters to back Macron against National Front (FN) candidate Marine Le Pen in the second round of the presidential election.

== Investigation for tax fraud ==
In 2017, the weekly Le Canard enchaîné claimed that Solère was the subject of a preliminary tax fraud investigation by the public prosecutor of Nanterre, for having failed paying his taxes between 2010 and 2013. In 2019, he was charged with tax fraud, influence peddling and misappropriation of public funds.
