= Arnaud Leroy =

French politician (born 1976)

Member of the French National Assembly for the fifth constituency for citizens abroad
- In office 20 June 2012 – 20 June 2017
- Preceded by: Constituency established
- Succeeded by: Samantha Cazebonne

Personal details
- Born: 23 April 1976 (age 49)
- Party: RE (since 2016); PS (2005–2017); LV (until 2005)

Arnaud Leroy (born 23 April 1976) is a French politician. From 2012 to 2017, he was a member of the National Assembly for the fifth constituency for citizens abroad. From 2018 to 2022, he served as president of the ADEME.
