= Raphaël Gauvain =

French politician (born 1973)

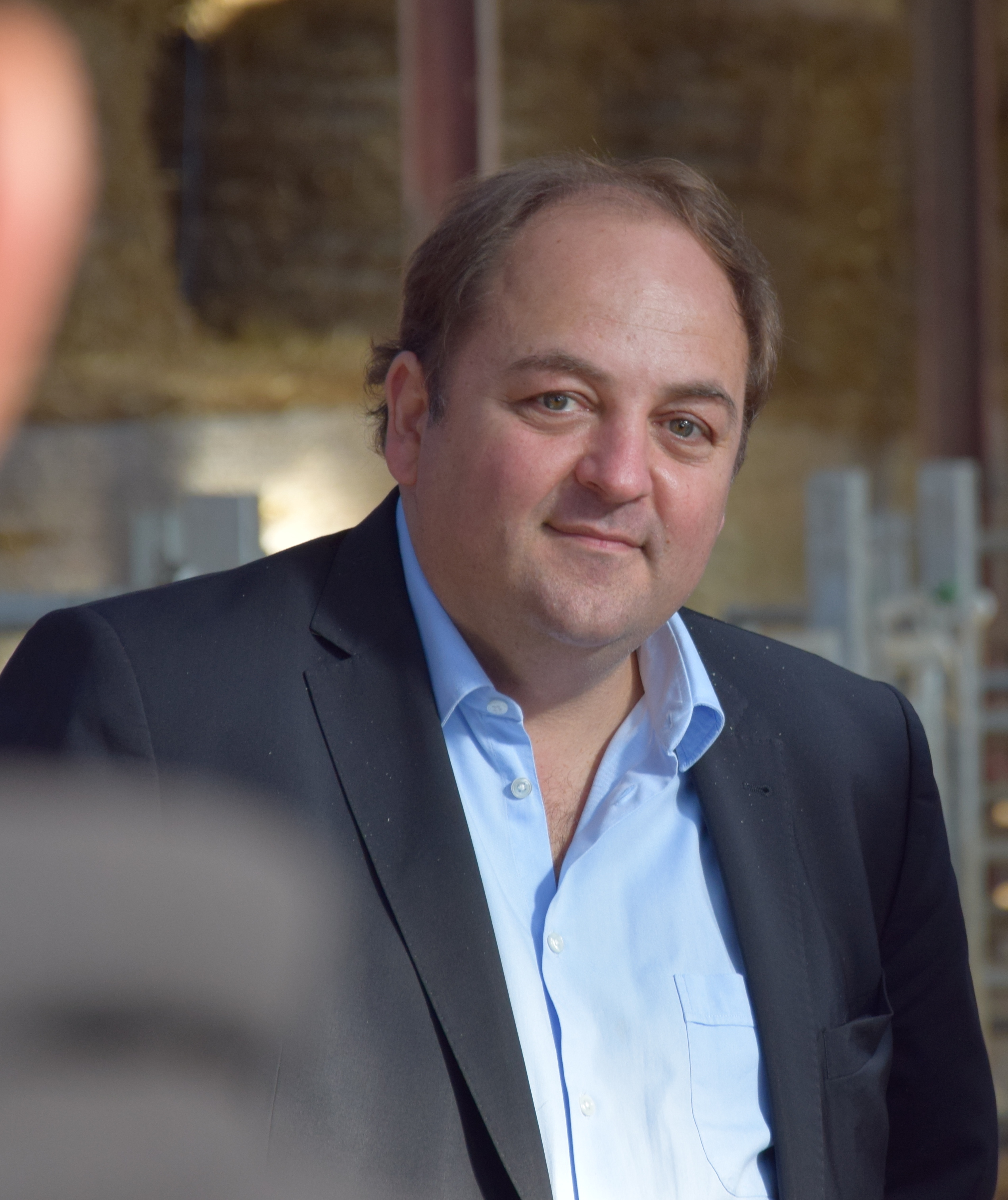

Member of the National Assembly for Saône-et-Loire's 5th constituency
- In office 21 June 2017 – 21 June 2022
- Preceded by: Christophe Sirugue
- Succeeded by: Louis Margueritte

Personal details
- Born: 10 April 1973 (age 53) Paris, France
- Party: La République En Marche!
- Education: Paris 1 Panthéon-Sorbonne University

Raphaël Gauvain (French pronunciation: [ʁafaɛl ɡovɛ̃]; born 10 April 1973) is a French lawyer and politician of La République En Marche! (LREM) who represented the 5th constituency of the Saône-et-Loire department in the National Assembly from 2017 to 2022.

== Political career ==
In parliament, Gauvain served on the Committee on Legal Affairs. In this capacity, he served as rapporteur on a 2017 anti-terrorism law, a 2018 business secrecy law, and a 2021 anti-corruption law.

== Political positions ==
In July 2019, Gauvain voted in favour of the French ratification of the European Union's Comprehensive Economic and Trade Agreement (CETA) with Canada.

== See also ==
- 2017 French legislative election
