= Fifth French legislative constituency for citizens abroad =

Constituency of the French Fifth Republic

5th constituency for French people domiciled outside France
- inline Constituency of the National Assembly of France

- Deputy: Nathalie Coggia; RE
- Department: none (residents abroad)
- Cantons: none
- Registered voters: 115,497

The fifth French legislative constituency for citizens abroad (cinquième circonscription des Français établis hors de France) is one of eleven constituencies each electing one representative of French citizens abroad to the French National Assembly.

This constituency elected its first ever representative at the 2012 French legislative election - Arnaud Leroy of the Socialist Party.

== Area ==
This constituency covers four countries: Portugal, Spain, Andorra and Monaco. As of New Year's Day 2011, it contained 116,196 registered French voters. The bulk of these, 89,391, were living in Spain, while 15,049 were living in Portugal, 8,302 in Monaco (a microstate which has a border only with France), and 3,454 in Andorra (a microstate, between Spain and France, of which the President of France is ex officio Co-Prince).

== Deputies ==
Election	Member	Party
2012	Arnaud Leroy	PS
2017	Samantha Cazebonne	LREM
2018 by-election	Samantha Cazebonne	LREM
2021	Stéphane Vojetta	LREM
2022	Stéphane Vojetta	LREM diss.
2024	Stéphane Vojetta	DVC
2025	Nathalie Coggia	RE

== Election results ==
=== 2025 by-election ===
On 11 July 2025, after invalidating his campaign accounts, the Constitutional Council declared Stéphane Vojetta, a member of parliament representing various centrist parties, ineligible for one year, resulting in his automatic resignation. Vojetta supported ‘as sponsor’ his deputy in 2024, Nathalie Coggia, who ran on a Renaissance list in the elections newly organised in September and October of the same year.

The partial legislative elections took place on 28 September 2025, with a second round on 12 October.

Candidate	Party	First round		Second round	
Candidate	Party	Votes	%	Votes	%
Nathalie Coggia	RE	5,277	26.4	11,806	65.0
Martha Peciña	LFI	3,164	15.8	6,364	35.0
Johana Maurel	RN	2,808	14.0		
Christophe Sougey de Funès	LR	1,986	9.9		
Guillaume Horn	PS	1,890	9.4		
Johan Chermette-Wagner	PP	1,599	8.0		
José Sanchez Perez	ECO	1,130	5.6		
Sébastien Tavera	R!	1,037	5.2		
Sandra Krief	PA	298	1.5		
Alexis Vallee	RPS	285	1.4		
Patrice Da’Aarras	SE	186	0.9		
Alexandre Marie	Volt	130	0.6		
Christopher Brenier	PLIB	86	0.4		
Thomas Brant	DVC	84	0.4		
Benoit Simian	DVC	37	0.2		
Frédéric Chaouat	DVG	26	0.1		
Valid votes		20,023	100.00	18,170	100.00
Blank votes		518	2.5	1,648	8.3
Null votes		27	0.1	67	0.3
Turnout		20,568	17.0	19,885	16.5
Abstentions		100,267	82.9	100,884	83.5
Registered voters		120,835		120,769	
Result		RE HOLD			

=== 2024 ===
Candidate	Party	Alliance	First round		Second round	
Candidate	Party	Alliance	Votes	%	Votes	%
Stéphane Vojetta	DVC	Ensemble	14,492	33.68	25,894	61.47
Maxime Da Silva	LFI	NFP	11,267	26.18	16,230	38.53
Johana Maurel	RN		8,385	19.49		
José Sanchez Perez	LR	UDC	2,227	5.17		
Jeremie Fosse	DVG		2,161	5.02		
Yohann Castro	DVD		2,069	4.81		
Béatrice Mazel	REC		794	1.85		
Sarah Millot	DVG		587	1.36		
Alexandre Marie	Volt		353	0.82		
Jean-François Calvet	DSV		308	0.72		
Maud Lagarde	DIV		187	0.43		
Christophe Brenier	DIV		132	0.31		
David Nataf	DIV		70	0.16		
Valid votes			43,031	100.00	42,124	100.00
Blank votes			591	1.35	2,957	6.54
Null votes			70	0.16	123	0.27
Turnout			43,692	37.83	45,204	39.14
Abstentions			71,810	62.17	70,293	60.86
Registered voters			115,502		115,497	
Result			DVC HOLD			

=== 2022 ===
Legislative Election 2022: 5th constituency for French citizens overseas
Party	Candidate	Votes	%	±%
EELV (NUPÉS)	Renaud Le Berre	6,942	27.89	-8.03
LREM	Stéphane Vojetta*	6,123	24.60	N/A
LREM (Ensemble)	Manuel Valls	4,024	16.17	−8.43
REC	Nicolas Chamoux	1,931	7.76	N/A
LR (UDC)	Laurent Goater	1,775	7.13	−6.82
DVE	José Sánchez Pérez	1,085	4.36	N/A
RN	Serge Bies	999	4.01	N/A
DIV	Claire Behar	665	2.67	N/A
FGR	Maria Isabel de Sousa Teixeira	510	2.05	N/A
Les Patriotes	Marc Ridelle	396	1.59	N/A
Volt	Robin Fontaine	375	1.51	N/A
Abertzale	Garbiñe Eraso	66	0.27	N/A
Turnout		24,891	23.99	+16.12
2nd round result
LREM	Stéphane Vojetta*	14,836	57.26	N/A
EELV (NUPÉS)	Renaud Le Berre	11,073	42.74	−3.30
Turnout		25,909	25.96	+17.99
LREM hold				

* LREM dissident

=== 2018 by-election ===
Candidate	Party	First round			Second round		
Candidate	Party	Votes	%	+/–	Votes	%	+/–
Samantha Cazebonne	REM–MoDem–UDI	2,398	35.15	–15.21	3,623	53.96	–12.25
François Ralle-Andreoli	FI–EELV–PCF–G.s	1,941	28.45	+12.93	3,091	46.04	+12.25
Raphaël Chambat	LR–LC–CPNT	952	13.95	–1.15			
Jean-Laurent Poitevin	DVD	511	7.49	+7.49			
Mehdi Benlahcen	PS	510	7.47	–0.66			
Ludovic Lemoues	EXD	275	4.03	+3.28			
Yohann Castro	DVD	122	1.79	+1.79			
Michel Hunault	DVD	63	0.92	+0.92			
Samir Sahraoui	SE	51	0.75	+0.75			
Votes		6,823	100.00	–	6,714	100.00	–
Valid votes		6,823	98.03	–1.15	6,714	95.26	–0.39
Blank votes		87	1.25	+0.76	203	2.88	–0.49
Null votes		50	0.72	+0.39	131	1.86	+0.89
Turnout		6,960	7.87	–8.07	7,048	7.97	–5.57
Abstentions		81,495	92.13	+8.07	81,360	92.03	+5.57
Registered voters		88,455			88,408		
Source: Ministère de l’Europe et des Affaires étrangères (first round), (second round)

=== 2017 ===
Candidate	Label	First round		Second round	
Candidate	Label	Votes	%	Votes	%
Samantha Cazebonne	REM	7,274	50.36	7,828	66.21
François Ralle-Andreoli	FI	2,242	15.52	3,995	33.79
Laurence Sailliet	LR	2,182	15.11		
Gabrielle Siry	PS	1,175	8.13		
Natacha Barral	FN	818	5.66		
Hubert Patural	DVD	206	1.43		
Alexis Boudaud-Anduaga	ECO	126	0.87		
Olivia Tholance	DIV	113	0.78		
Éric Morgeau	EXD	108	0.75		
Benjamin Leduc	DVD	85	0.59		
Caroline Guébel	DIV	59	0.41		
Venise Jonnet	DIV	51	0.35		
Olivier Hennebelle	DIV	6	0.04		
Chloé Teyssou	DVD	0	0.00		
Votes		14,445	100.00	11,823	100.00
Valid votes		14,445	99.18	11,823	95.66
Blank votes		71	0.49	417	3.37
Null votes		48	0.33	120	0.97
Turnout		14,564	15.94	12,360	13.54
Abstentions		76,810	84.06	78,931	86.46
Registered voters		91,374		91,291	
Source: Ministry of the Interior

=== 2012 ===
==== Candidates ====
The list of candidates was officially finalised on 14 May. There were thirteen candidates:

The Union for a Popular Movement initially chose Minister of Industry Éric Besson as its candidate. A former Socialist MP, Besson joined the UMP in 2007 and was appointed to President Nicolas Sarkozy's government. In December 2011, however, the party announced that Laurence Sailliet, its national secretary for the Iberian Peninsula, would be its candidate. Francis Huss was her deputy (suppléant).

The Socialist Party chose Arnaud Leroy, a resident of Lisbon. He worked for the European Maritime Safety Agency, as an expert on environmental protection and climate change. Formerly a member of The Greens, he joined the Socialist Party, stating that political ecology should become a central issue in the renovation of social-democratic ideas. His deputy (suppléante) was Soledad Margareto, a resident of Madrid.

Juliette Estivil, originally from Spain and a member of the Left Party, was the chosen candidate of the Left Front, which also included the French Communist Party. She was a teacher of Spanish. Her deputy (suppléant) was Bruno Fialho.

Europe Écologie–The Greens chose Carolina Punset, with Stéphane Etcheverry as her deputy (suppléant). A resident of Altea, in Spain, Punset was a municipal councillor in her home town.

The National Front chose Alain Lavarde, with Jacques Struzynski as his deputy (suppléant).

The centre-right Radical Party and the centrist Republican, Ecologist and Social Alliance jointly chose Richard Onses, a resident of Barcelona, as their candidate. He was also a member of the centre-right Catalan party Convergence and Union. Guy-Michel Sembres was his deputy (suppléant).

The Radical Party of the Left chose Muriel Guenoux, with Stéphane Grandpierre as her deputy (suppléant).

Jean-Bastien Urfels, a resident of Spain working as headmaster in a French school, was the candidate endorsed by Arise the Republic. Norman Ledoux was his deputy (suppléant).

Solidarity and Progress, the French branch of the LaRouche movement, was represented by Sébastien Drochon, with Karim Bakouri as his deputy (suppléant).

The Liberal Democratic Party chose Sophie Levamis. A resident of Hendaye, in the French Pyrenees, she argued that expatriates should choose a candidate who lived in France and would thus be "independent from every country" in their constituency. Jan Laarman was her deputy (suppléant).

Prince Charles Philippe, Duke of Anjou, grandson of Henri, Count of Paris (the Orléanist claimant to the throne of France until his death), stood (under the name Charles-Philippe d'Orléans) as an independent candidate, with the expressed hope of joining a "recomposed centre-right party" after the election. He was a resident of Portugal, and former resident of Spain. Sylvie Gourgeon was his deputy (suppléante).

Bernard Soulier, an economist and resident of Madrid, stood as an independent candidate. Pascale Lagneaux was his deputy (suppléante).

Catherine N'Guyen Thi Minh was an independent candidate, with Michel Rioche as her deputy.

==== Results ====
As in other constituencies, turnout in the first round was low: 19.5% in Portugal, 20% in Monaco, 20.5% in Spain, and 22.1% in Andorra. The result was the closest of any of the eleven expatriate constituencies, with UMP candidate Laurence Sailliet taking a 1.33% lead (217 votes). She finished first in Andorra and Monaco, while her Socialist rival Arnaud Leroy was first in Spain and Portugal. (Leroy was only third in Monaco, behind National Front candidate Alain Lavarde.) Juliette Estivil obtained the Left Front's joint best result abroad (fourth with 8.61%), matched by Raquel Garrido in the first constituency. Charles-Philippe d'Orléans obtained only 3% of the vote overall, but did finish fourth in Portugal, his country of residence, with 7.37%, and fourth also in Monaco, with 5.33%.

Legislative Election 2012: Overseas residents 5 - 2nd round
Party	Candidate	Votes	%	±%
PS	Arnaud Leroy	8,485	52.67	−
UMP	Laurence Sailliet	7,624	47.33	−
Turnout				
PS win (new seat)				

Legislative Election 2012: Overseas residents 5 - 1st round
Party	Candidate	Votes	%	±%
UMP	Laurence Sailliet	5,087	31.88	−
PS	Arnaud Leroy	4,870	30.52	−
EELV	Carolina Punset	1,514	9.49	−
FG	Juliette Estivil	1,374	8.61	−
FN	Alain Lavarde	1,035	6.49	−
Radical	Richard Onses	745	4.67	−
DVD	Charles-Philippe d'Orléans	486	3.05	−
Independent	Bernard Soulier	347	1.37	−
PLD	Sophie Levamis	218	0.99	−
PRG	Muriel Guenoux	124	0.78	
SP	Sébastein Drochon	101	0.63	−
Independent	Catherine N'Guyen Thi Minh	64	0.40	−
DLR	Jean-Bastien Urfels	21	0.13	−
Turnout		16 185	20.4	−
