= Sébastien Martin =

French politician (born 1977)

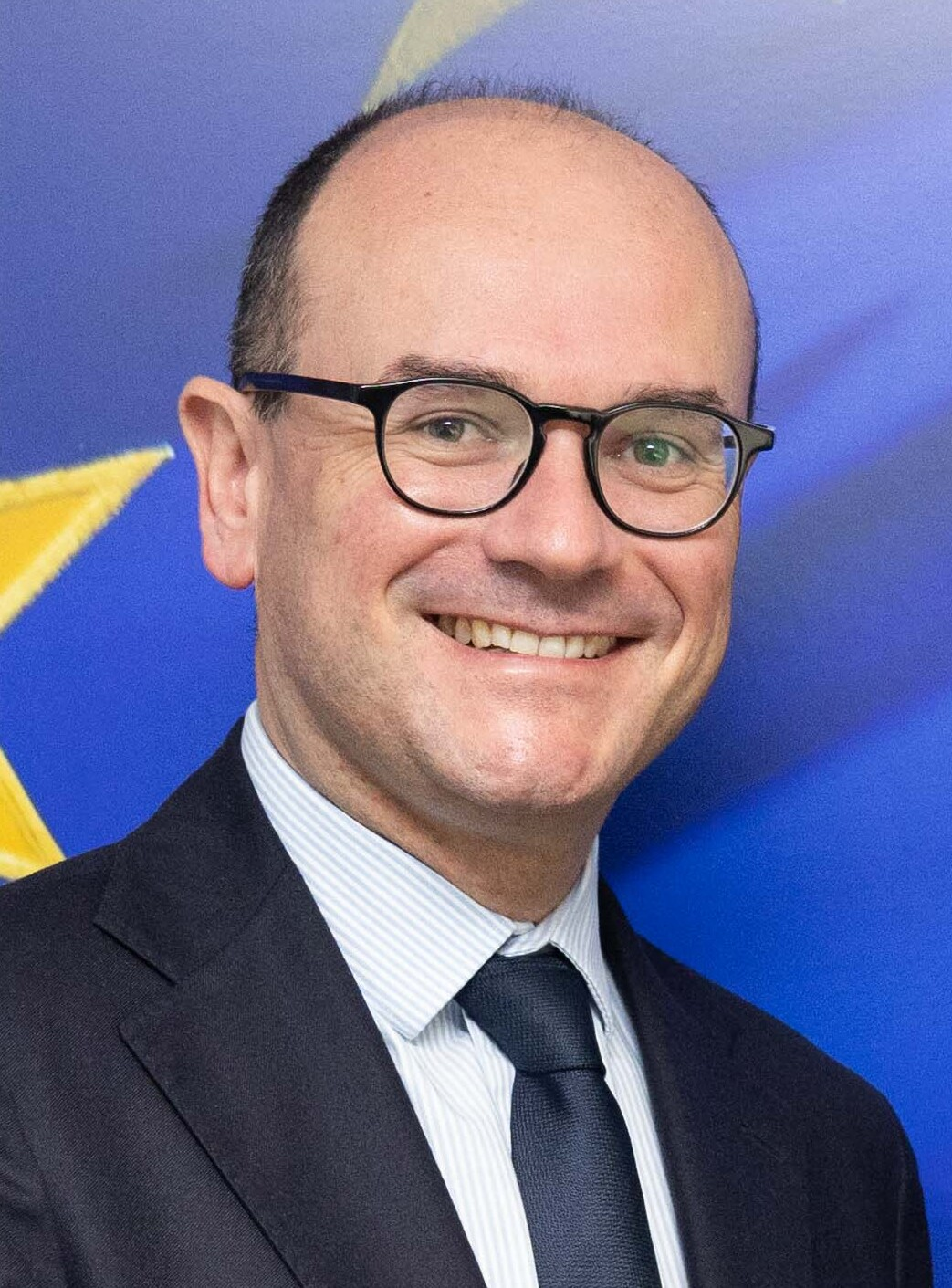
- Sébastien Martin in 2025

Member of the National Assembly for Saône-et-Loire's 5th constituency
- Incumbent
- Assumed office 26 May 2025
- Preceded by: Arnaud Sanvert

President of Le Grand Chalon
- Incumbent
- Assumed office 17 April 2014
- Preceded by: Christophe Sirugue

Personal details
- Born: 24 November 1977 (age 48)
- Party: Les Republicains

Sébastien Martin (French pronunciation: [sebastjɛ̃ maʁtɛ̃]; born 24 November 1977) is a French politician of the Republicans (LR) who has been serving as Minister Delegate for Industry in the government of Prime Minister Sébastien Lecornu since 2025.

Martin has served as president of Le Grand Chalon since 2014, and as president of Intercommunalités de France since 2020. He has also served as first vice president of the Departmental Council of Saône-et-Loire since 2015.

== Political career ==
A candidate for the National Assembly in Saône-et-Loire's 5th constituency in the 2025 by-election, he defeated Arnaud Sanvert of the National Rally in the second round.

In parliament, Martin served on the Committee on Cultural Affairs and Education.
