= Hauts-de-Seine's 9th constituency =

Constituency of the National Assembly of France

9th constituency of Hauts-de-Seine
- inline Constituency of the National Assembly of France

- Deputy: Elisabeth de Maistre; LR
- Department: Hauts-de-Seine
- Cantons: Boulogne-Billancourt Nord-Est, Boulogne-Billancourt Nord-Ouest, Boulogne-Billancourt Sud
- Registered voters: 61,020

The 9th constituency of the Hauts-de-Seine is a French legislative constituency in the Hauts-de-Seine département.

== Description ==
Hauts-de-Seine's 9th constituency is entirely composed of the town of Boulogne-Billancourt which lies just west of Paris and forms an exclusive and wealthy suburb.

The constituency elected conservative deputies throughout its history until 2022. At the 2012 Thierry Solère a municipal councillor stood against the official UMP candidate Claude Guéant and won by a margin of less than 400 votes. Solère re-joined the UMP in 2013.

== Historic representative ==
Election	Member	Party
1967	Claude Labbé	UDR
1968	Claude Labbé	UDR
1973	Claude Labbé	UDR
1978	Claude Labbé	RPR
1981	Claude Labbé	RPR
1986	Proportional representation – no election by constituency	
1988	Georges Gorse	RPR
1993	Georges Gorse	RPR
1997	Pierre-Christophe Baguet	UDF
2002	Pierre-Christophe Baguet	UMP
2007	Pierre-Christophe Baguet	UMP
2012	Thierry Solère	DVD
2013	Thierry Solère	UMP
2017	Thierry Solère	UMP
2017	Thierry Solère	LREM
2022	Emmanuel Pellerin	RE
2024	Stéphane Séjourné	RE
2025	Elisabeth de Maistre	LR

== Election results ==
=== 2025 by-election ===
Candidate	Party	Alliance	First round			Second round		
Candidate	Party	Alliance	Votes	%	+/–	Votes	%	+/–
Elisabeth de Maistre	LR		7,407	38.17	+23.00	9,260	59.65	N/A
Antoine de Jerphanion	HOR		3,631	18.71	new	6,264	40.35	N/A
Pauline Rapilly-Ferniot	LÉ	NFP	2,684	13.83	-7.56			
Laurianne Rossi	RE		2,645	13.63	-26.44			
Matteo Giammarresi	RN		1,691	8.71	-5.22			
Philippe Tellini	LR-NE		786	4.05	new			
Aloïs Lang-Rousseau	ECO		240	1.24	new			
Erwan Nicolas	ÉQU		236	1.22	new			
Anne-Laure Chaudon	LO		65	0.33	-0.15			
Jean-Baptiste Layly	SE		12	0.06	new			
Marc Lesteven	SE		7	0.04	new			
Valid votes			19,404	98.46	+0.13	15,524	94.00	+1.92
Blank votes			304	1.54	-0.13	991	6.00	-1.92
Turnout			19,708	30.82	-44.29	16,515	25.82	-40.09
Abstentions			44,242	69.18	+44.29	47,443	74.18	+40.09
Registered voters			63,950			63,958		
Source: Boulogne-Billancourt, LCP
Result						LR GAIN FROM RE		

=== 2024 ===
Candidate	Party	Alliance	First round			Second round		
Candidate	Party	Alliance	Votes	%	+/–	Votes	%	+/–
Stéphane Séjourné	RE	ENS	21,593	46.07	+16.77	27,978	72.63	+18.72
Pauline Rapilly-Ferniot	LÉ	NFP	10,024	21.39	+1.74	10,543	27.37	N/A
Virginie Mathot	LR		7,108	15.17	-6.64			
Julia Carrasco	RN		6,528	13.93	+9.65			
Joseph Samoun	REC		840	1.79	-5.42			
Hazrije Mustafic	DIV		459	0.98	new			
Anne-Laure Chaudon	LO		225	0.48	+0.14			
Thierry Narboni	DIV		92	0.20	new			
Valid votes			46,869	98.33	-0.30	38,521	92.08	-0.33
Blank votes			796	1.67	+0.30	3,314	7.92	+0.33
Null votes			0	0.00	-0.40	0	0.00	-0.72
Turnout			47,665	75.11	+18.90	41,835	65.91	+15.81
Abstentions			15,798	24.89	-18.90	21,641	34.09	-15.81
Registered voters			63,463			63,476		
Source: Ministry of the Interior, Le Monde
Result						RE HOLD		

=== 2022 ===
Legislative Election 2022: Hauts-de-Seine's 9th constituency
Party	Candidate	Votes	%	±%
LREM (Ensemble)	Emmanuel Pellerin	10,307	29.30	N/A
LR (UDC)	Pascal Louap	7,672	21.81	-20.79
EELV (NUPÉS)	Pauline Rapilly Ferniot	6,200	17.63	+10.08
DVD	Antoine De Jerphanion	5,349	15.21	N/A
REC	Guillaume Bessieres	2,538	7.21	N/A
RN	Nathalie Gaude	1,507	4.28	+1.07
DVG	Laurent Violleau	712	2.02	N/A
Others	N/A	892		
Turnout		35,665	56.21	+4.39
2nd round result
LREM (Ensemble)	Emmanuel Pellerin	15,838	53.91	N/A
LR (UDC)	Pascal Louap	13,542	46.09	−10.44
Turnout		29,380	50.10	+9.82
LREM gain from LR				

=== 2017 ===
Legislative Election 2017: Hauts-de-Seine's 9th constituency
Party	Candidate	Votes	%	±%
LR	Thierry Solère	14,346	42.60	+12.19
DVD	Marie-Laure Godin	10,568	31.38	N/A
DVG	Fabienne Gambiez	2,144	6.37	N/A
EELV	Aminata Niakate	1,687	5.01	+2.05
FN	Nina Smarandi	1,081	3.21	−2.08
PCF	Isabelle Goitia	856	2.54	+0.47
Others	N/A	2,994		
Turnout		33,676	51.82	−7.34
2nd round result
LR	Thierry Solère	14,800	56.53	+17.18
DVD	Marie-Laure Godin	11,379	43.47	N/A
Turnout		26,179	40.28	−17.66
LR gain from DVD		Swing		

=== 2012 ===
Legislative Election 2012: Hauts-de-Seine's 9th constituency
Party	Candidate	Votes	%	±%
UMP	Claude Gueant	10,978	30.41	−28.91
DVD	Thierry Solère	9,709	26.89	N/A
PS	Martine Even	7,994	22.14	+3.97
FN	Julien Dufour	1,908	5.29	+3.03
DVD	Dorothée Pineau	1,691	4.68	−6.24
DVD	Julien Marcel	1,076	2.98	N/A
EELV	Odile Joyeux	1,067	2.96	+0.46
FG	Isabelle Goitia	748	2.07	N/A
Others	N/A	930		
Turnout		36,101	59.16	−3.95
2nd round result
DVD	Thierry Solère	13,912	39.35	N/A
UMP	Claude Gueant	13,578	38.41	N/A
PS	Martine Even	7,864	22.24	N/A
Turnout		35,354	57.94	N/A
DVD gain from UMP				

=== 2007 ===
Legislative Election 2007: Hauts-de-Seine's 9th constituency
Party	Candidate	Votes	%	±%
UMP	Pierre-Christophe Baguet	22,433	59.32	
PS	Pierre Gaborit	6,873	18.17	
DVD	Dorothée Pineau	4,129	10.92	
LV	Peggy Duboucher	947	2.50	
FN	Eric Du Reau	854	2.26	
Others	N/A	2,580		
Turnout		38,351	63.11	
UMP hold				

=== 2002 ===
Legislative Election 2002: Hauts-de-Seine's 9th constituency
Party	Candidate	Votes	%	±%
UMP	Pierre-Christophe Baguet	21,982	61.02	
PS	Pierre Gaborit	7,434	20.64	
FN	Eric du Reau	2,277	6.32	
DIV	Winoc Deleplanque	849	2.36	
Others	N/A	3,484		
Turnout		36,312	67.62	
UMP gain from UDF				

=== 1997 ===
Legislative Election 1997: Hauts-de-Seine's 9th constituency
Party	Candidate	Votes	%	±%
UDF	Pierre-Christophe Baguet	9,399	28.11	
PS	Pierre Gaborit	6,367	19.04	
RPR	Georges Gorse	4,795	14.34	
FN	Olivier Pichon	3,405	10.18	
RPR	Gérard Askinazi	1,842	5.51	
DVD	Christine Bruneau	1,687	5.05	
PCF	Jean-Pierre Quilgars	1,128	3.37	
RPR	Francis Choisel	1,086	3.25	
LV	Marie-Françoise Duthu	1,000	2.99	
Others	N/A	2,728		
Turnout		34,385	64.53	
2nd round result
UDF	Pierre-Christophe Baguet	23,464	68.26	
PS	Pierre Gaborit	10,908	31.74	
Turnout		35,668	66.94	
UDF gain from RPR				

== Sources ==
- Official results of French elections from 1998: "Résultats électoraux officiels en France" (in French). Archived from the original on 20 December 2011.
