= Stéphane Vojetta =

French politician (born 1974)

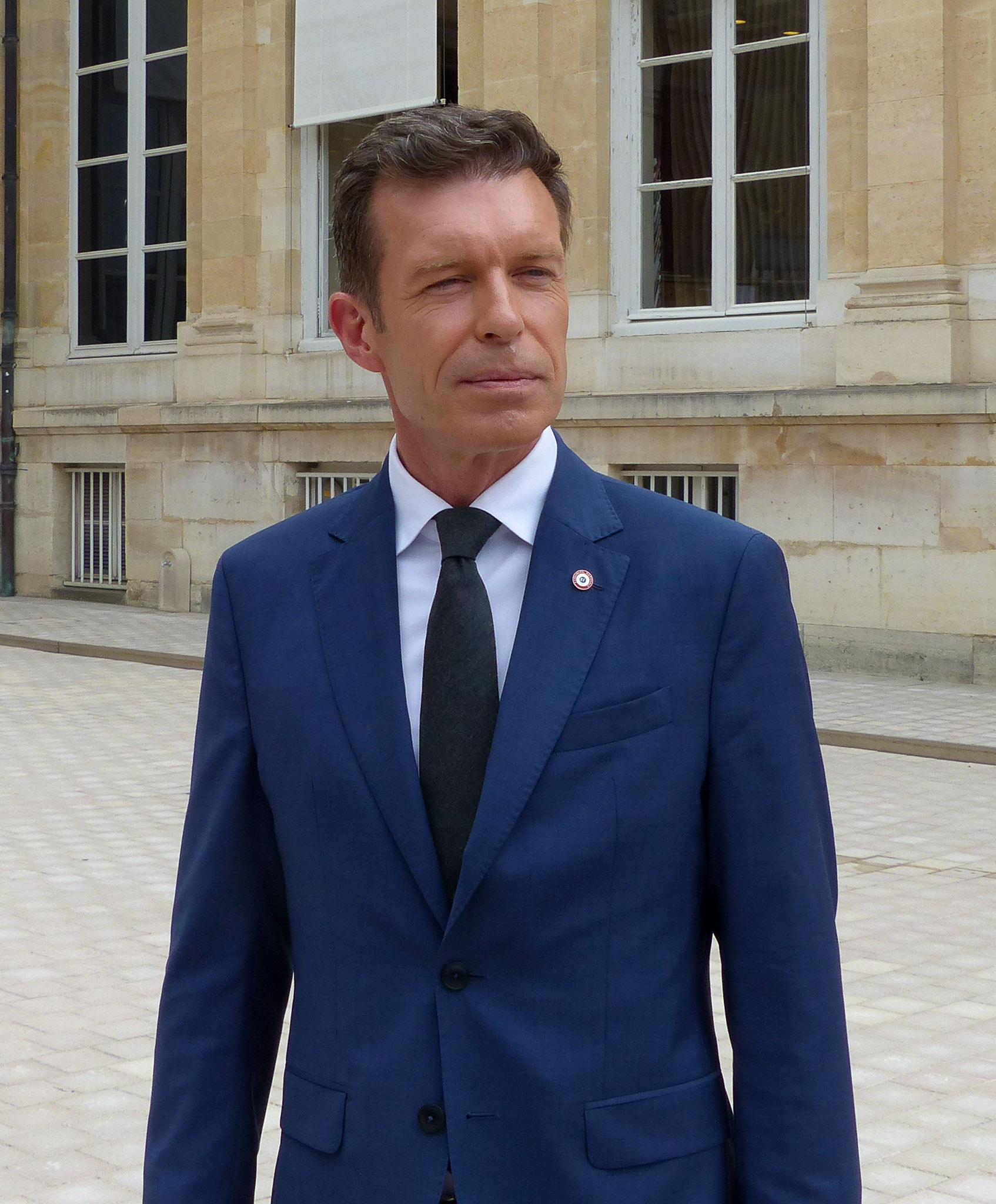

Member of the National Assembly for the Fifth constituency for citizens abroad
- In office 1 October 2021 – 11 July 2025
- Preceded by: Samantha Cazebonne
- Succeeded by: Nathalie Coggia

Personal details
- Born: 19 July 1974 (age 51) Nancy, France
- Party: SE; La République En Marche! (until 2022)

Stephane Vojetta (born 19 July 1974) is a French politician who served as the member of the National Assembly for the Fifth constituency for citizens abroad from 2021 to 2025. He succeeded Samantha Cazebonne as her substitute following her election to the Senate.

He was removed from La République En Marche on 17 May 2022, after opting to stand for re-election against his party's chosen candidate, Manuel Valls, the former Prime Minister. Nonetheless, he was re-elected in 2022, and again in 2024.

In July 2025, the Constitutional Council invalidated his election due to irregularities in campaign financing, forcing him to immediately resign and triggering a by-election.
