= Nathalie Coggia =

French politician (born 1977)

Member of the French National Assembly for the fifth constituency for citizens abroad
- Incumbent
- Assumed office 12 October 2025
- Preceded by: Stéphane Vojetta

Personal details
- Born: 16 July 1977 (age 48)
- Party: Renaissance

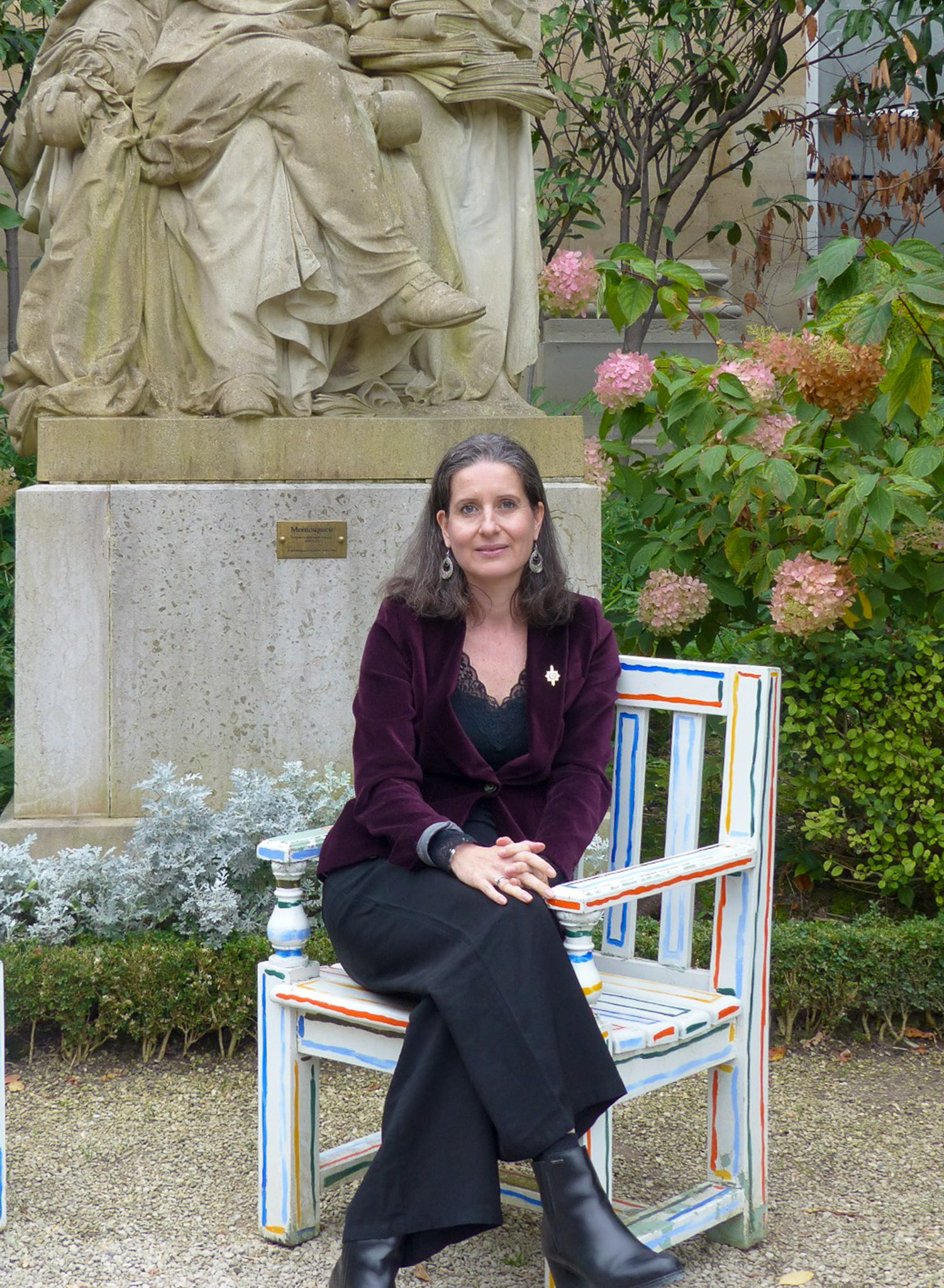
Coggia in 2025

Nathalie Coggia (born 16 July 1977) is a French politician serving as a member of the National Assembly since 2025. From 2022 to 2025, she was the substitute of Stéphane Vojetta.
