= Georges Gorse =

French politician and diplomat

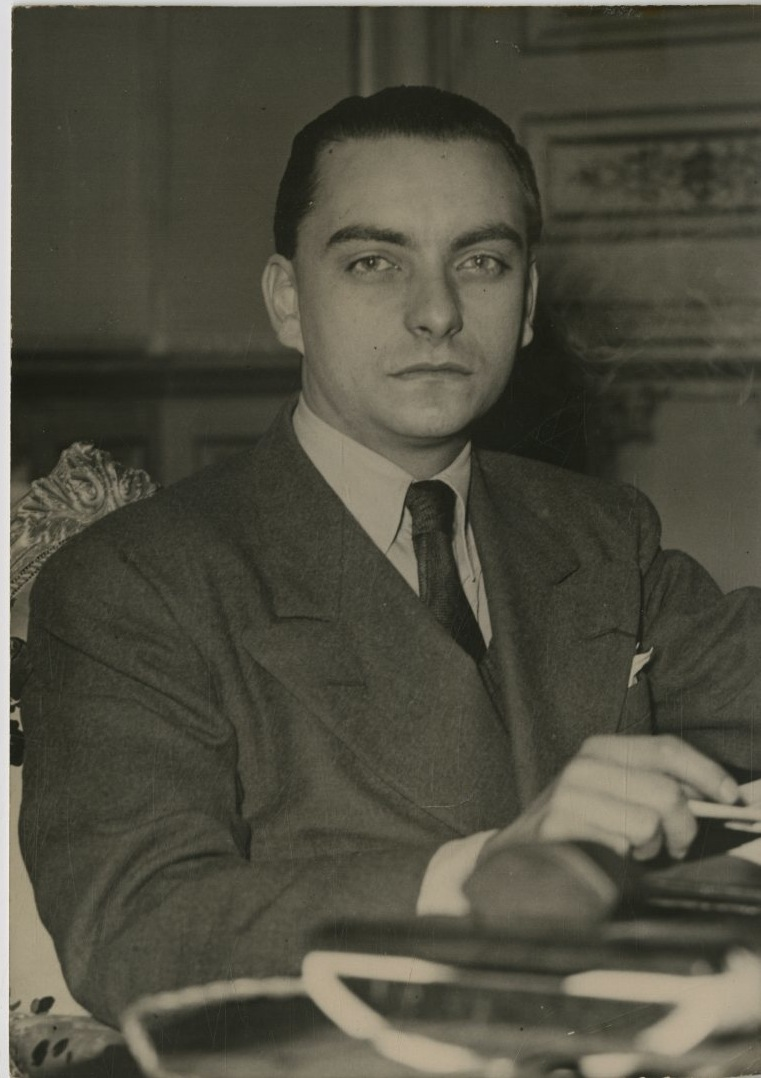

Member of the National Assembly for Hauts-de-Seine
- In office 1967–1997
- Succeeded by: Pierre-Christophe Baguet

Mayor of Boulogne-Billancourt
- In office 1971–1991
- Preceded by: Albert Agogué
- Succeeded by: Paul Graziani

Personal details
- Born: 15 February 1915 Cahors, France
- Died: 17 March 2002 (aged 87) Paris, France
- Party: RPR
- Education: École normale supérieure

Georges Gorse (French pronunciation: [ʒɔʁʒ ɡɔʁs]; 15 February 1915 – 17 March 2002) was a French politician and diplomat.

Born in Cahors, he qualified in 1939 as a professor at the University of Cairo. During World War II he joined Charles de Gaulle and the Free French as Director of Information, served on the Provisional Consultative Assembly. After the war he was elected to represent the Vendée in the French National Assembly from 1946 to 1951, and then the Section Française de l'Internationale Ouvrière (SFIO) from 1951 onwards. In 1957, Guy Mollet made him an Ambassador to Algeria, then he was elected as Gaullist representative which he held from 1967 to 1997.

During the events of May 1968, having attended a private political meeting as Minister of Information, he broke the news to the French media of de Gaulle's now notorious statement "reform yes, but 'chienlit, no".

Gorse held a wide range of positions of state:

- Under-secretary of State for Muslim Affairs 1946 to 1947
- Under-secretary of State for Foreign Affairs 1949 to 1950
- Secretary of State for Foreign Affairs, 1961 to 1962
- Secretary of State for Foreign Affairs, 1962
- Minister for Co-operation, 1962
- Ambassador to Algeria, 1963 to 1967
- Minister of Labour, 1973 to 1974
- Mayor of Boulogne-Billancourt, 1971 to 1991

== Bibliography ==
- Georges Gorse – Autobiography, "Je n'irai pas à mon enterrement" ("I will not go to my burial"). published 1992
