= Christophe Sirugue =

French politician

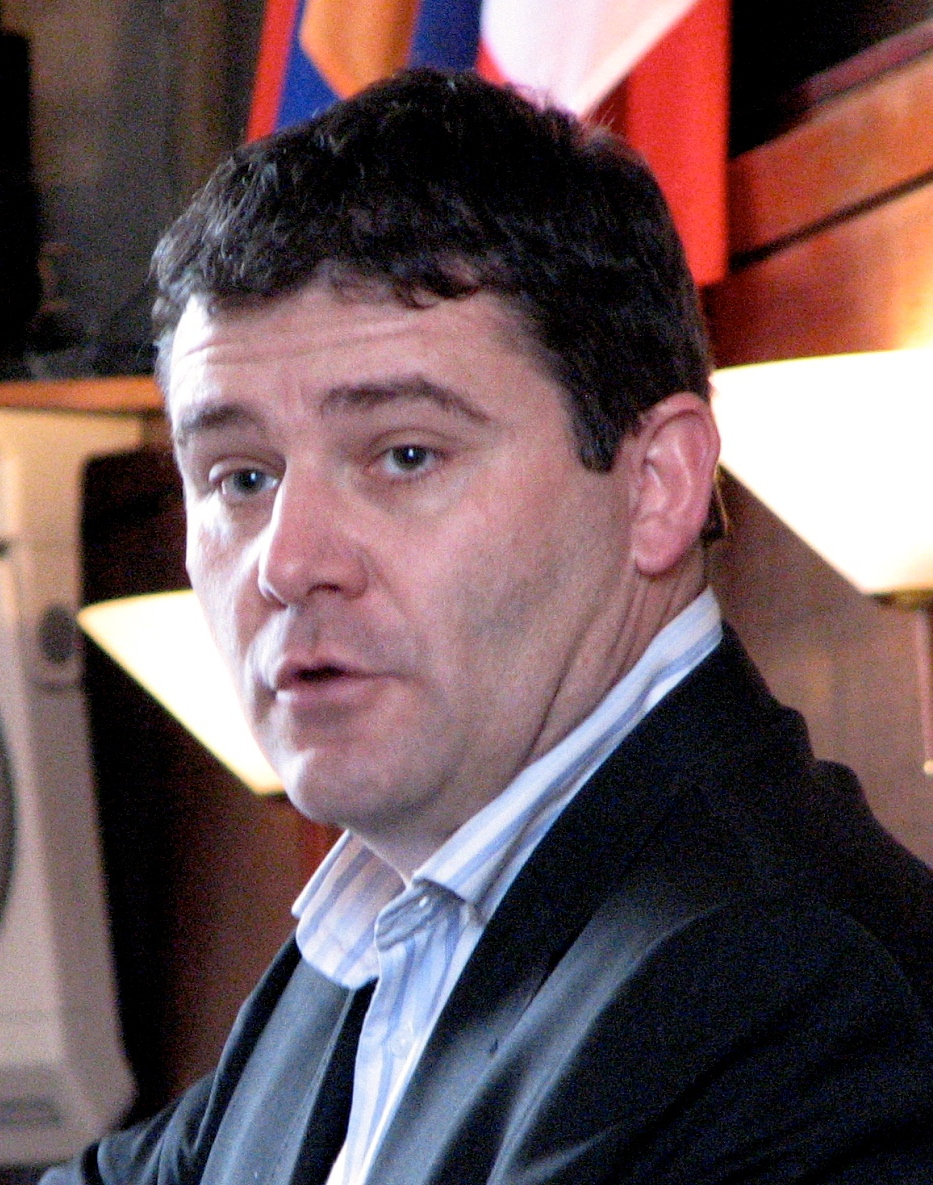

Secretary of State for Industry
- In office 1 September 2016 – 10 May 2017
- President: François Hollande
- Prime Minister: Manuel Valls; Bernard Cazeneuve
- Preceded by: Emmanuel Macron

Member of the National Assembly for Saône-et-Loire's 5th constituency
- In office 2007–2016
- Preceded by: Dominique Juillot
- Succeeded by: Raphaël Gauvain

Mayor of Châlon-sur-Saône
- In office 2008–2014
- Preceded by: Michel Allex
- Succeeded by: Gilles Platret

Personal details
- Born: 14 August 1966 (age 60) Autun, France
- Party: Socialist Party
- Education: University of Burgundy

Christophe Sirugue (French pronunciation: [kʁistɔf siʁyɡ]; born 14 August 1966 in Autun, Saône-et-Loire) was a member of the National Assembly of France. He represents the Saône-et-Loire department, and is a member of the Socialiste, radical, citoyen et divers gauche. He is vice-president of the French National Assembly since 2012.
