= Brigitte Barèges =

French politician (born 1953)

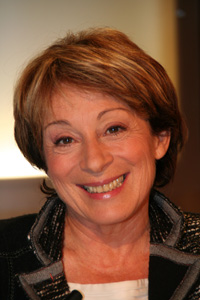
- Brigitte Barèges in 2009

Mayor of Montauban
- In office 22 December 2021 – 19 August 2024
- Preceded by: Axel de Labriolle
- Succeeded by: Marie-Claude Berly
- In office 24 March 2001 – 9 February 2021
- Preceded by: Roland Garrigues
- Succeeded by: Axel de Labriolle

Member of the National Assembly for Tarn-et-Garonne's 1st constituency
- In office 18 July 2024 – 11 July 2025
- Preceded by: Valérie Rabault
- Succeeded by: Pierre-Henri Carbonnel
- In office 19 June 2002 – 12 June 2012
- Preceded by: Roland Garrigues
- Succeeded by: Valérie Rabault

Personal details
- Born: Brigitte Taurines; 1 May 1953 (age 73) Toulouse, France
- Party: Union of the Right for the Republic (2024–present)
- Other political affiliations: Rally for the Republic (1993–2002); Union for a Popular Movement (2002–2015); The Republicans (2015–2024)
- Children: 3
- Occupation: Politician, lawyer

Brigitte Barèges (French: [bʁiʒit baʁɛʒ]; born 1 May 1953) is a French politician and lawyer who has been a member of the National Assembly from 2024 to 2025, representing Tarn-et-Garonne's 1st constituency. She is a member of the Union of the Right for the Republic (UDR).

From March 2001 to February 2021 and again from December 2021 to August 2024, she worked as the mayor of Montauban.

On 7 July 2024, she was elected member of the National Assembly, representing Tarn-et-Garonne's 1st constituency. On 11 July 2025, the Constitutional Council invalidated the election due to irregularities in campaign financing, forcing her to immediately resign and triggering a by-election. She is declared ineligible.

== Controversies and legal issues ==
Barèges sparked a controversy when she voiced brusque opposition to proposals for legalized same-sex marriage: "Why not let people marry animals, too?" Barèges sparked a controversy when she described a black person of her party as "humain stain". Barèges was punished by French courts because she refused to celebrate the wedding of a foreign couple.

On 17 February 2014, the prosecutor announces that it will conduct an investigation for embezzlement of public funds. Despite this challenge on the judicial front, on 30 March 2014, Barèges won the municipal elections in Montauban for a third term. During the summer of 2014, CNCCFP rejects the accounts for the municipal elections. On 21 October 2014, following the rejection of her campaign accounts, Barèges was condemned to one year of ineligibility and non-reimbursement of campaign expenses by the Administrative Court of Toulouse. The court mentioned the use of municipality funds to fund an illegal advertising campaign during the election.

On 9 February 2021, she was condemned to an 18 months prison suspended sentence, a 15 000 € fine and five years of ineligibility with immediate effect. On appeal, on December 14, 2021, she was acquitted of the charges against her. While the public prosecutor's office decided not to appeal her acquittal, Brigitte Barèges was re-elected mayor of Montauban on December 22, 2021, following the resignation of Axel de Labriolle.
