= Pierre-Christophe Baguet =

French politician

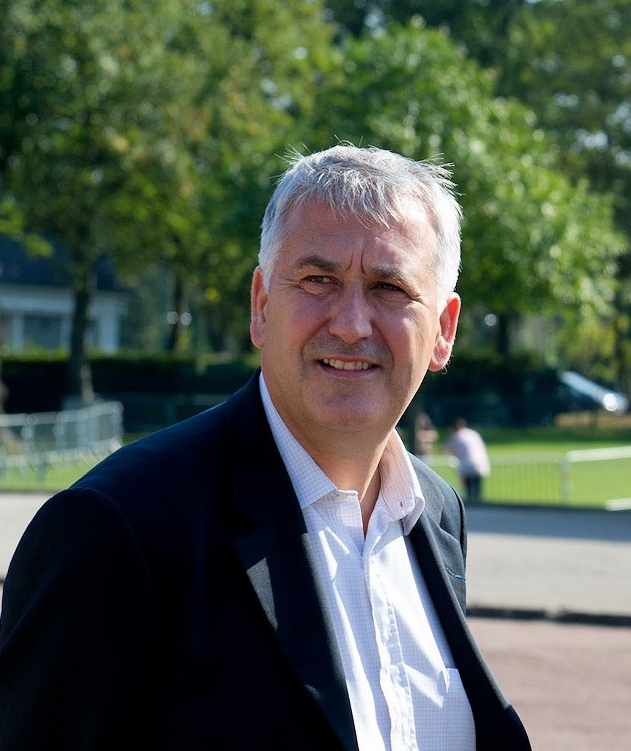

Mayor of Boulogne-Billancourt
- Incumbent
- Assumed office 16 March 2008
- Preceded by: Pierre-Mathieu Duhamel

Member of the National Assembly for Hauts-de-Seine's 9th constituency
- In office 1997–2012
- Preceded by: Georges Gorse
- Succeeded by: Thierry Solère

Personal details
- Born: 11 May 1955 (age 70) Paris, France
- Party: The Republicans

Pierre-Christophe Baguet (French pronunciation: [pjɛʁ kʁistɔf baɡɛ]; born 11 May 1955) is a French politician, mayor of Boulogne-Billancourt and member of the National Assembly of France between 1997 and 2012. He represents the Hauts-de-Seine department, and is a member of The Republicans.
