= Stéphane Séjourné =

French lawyer and politician (born 1985)

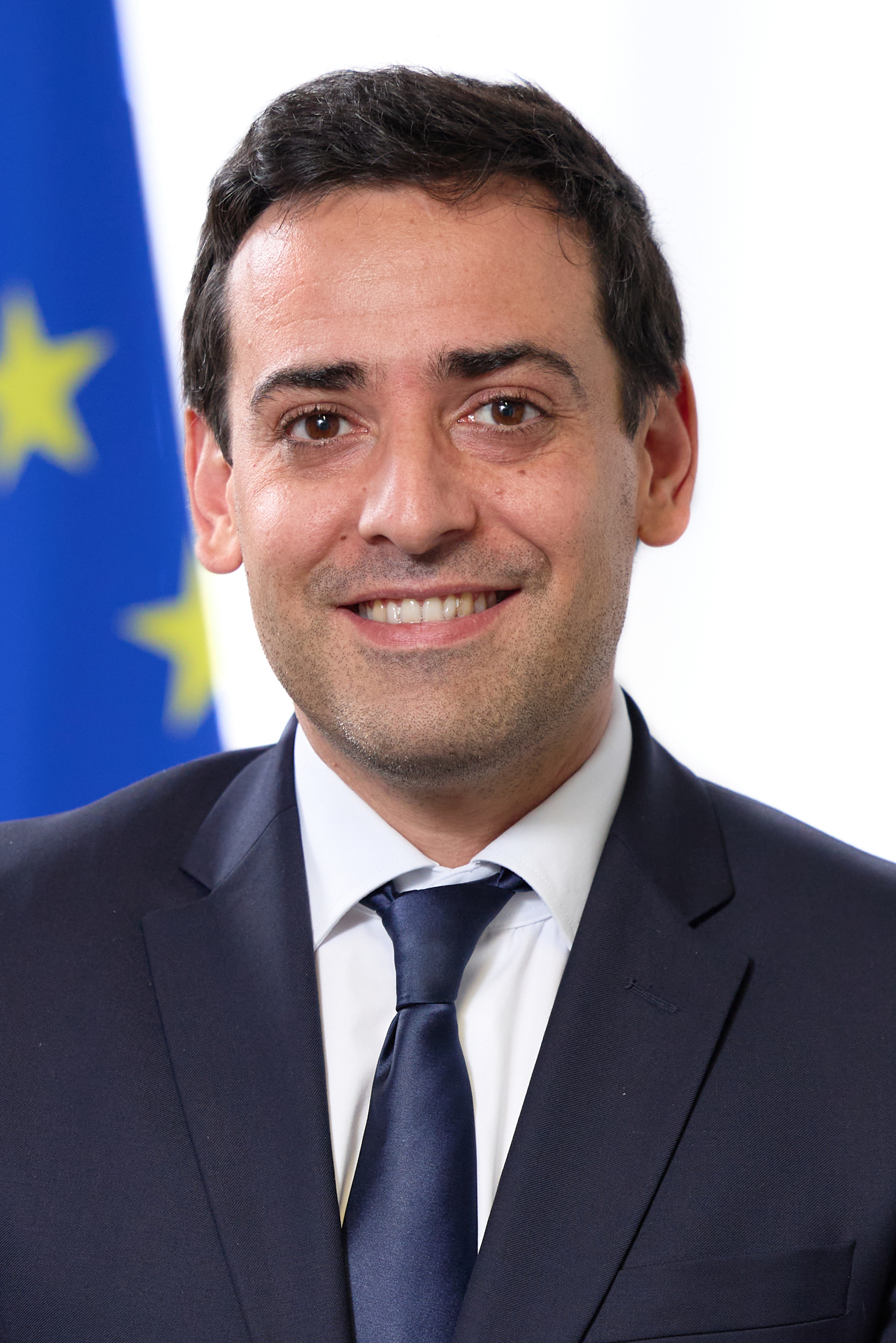
- Official portrait, 2024

Executive Vice-President of the European Commission for Prosperity and Industrial Strategy
- Incumbent
- Assumed office 1 December 2024
- Commission: Von der Leyen II
- Preceded by: Position established

European Commissioner for Industry, SMEs and the Single Market
- Incumbent
- Assumed office 1 December 2024
- Commission: Von der Leyen II
- Preceded by: Margrethe Vestager (caretaker)

Minister for Europe and Foreign Affairs
- In office 11 January 2024 – 21 September 2024
- Prime Minister: Gabriel Attal
- Preceded by: Catherine Colonna
- Succeeded by: Jean-Noël Barrot

Member of the National Assembly for Hauts-de-Seine's 9th constituency
- In office 8 July 2024 – 30 November 2024
- Preceded by: Emmanuel Pellerin
- Succeeded by: Élisabeth de Maistre

Member of the European Parliament for France
- In office 2 July 2019 – 11 January 2024
- Succeeded by: Guy Lavocat
Leadership roles
Secretary General of Renaissance
In office 18 September 2022 – 8 December 2024
President	Emmanuel Macron
Preceded by	Stanislas Guerini
Succeeded by	Gabriel Attal
Leader of Renew Europe
In office 19 October 2021 – 11 January 2024
Preceded by	Dacian Cioloș
Succeeded by	Valérie Hayer

Personal details
- Born: 26 March 1985 (age 41) Versailles, France
- Party: Renaissance (since 2016)
- Other political affiliations: Socialist Party (2001–2016)
- Domestic partner: Gabriel Attal (2015–2022, since 2024)
- Education: University of Poitiers (BA, LLM)

Stéphane Séjourné ([stefan seʒuʁne]; born 26 March 1985) is a French politician of Renaissance who has served as Executive Vice-President of the European Commission and Commissioner for Industry, SMEs and the Single Market since 2024. He previously held the post of Minister for Europe and Foreign Affairs in the government of Gabriel Attal from January to September 2024.

Originally a member of the Socialist Party, he later became an advisor to Emmanuel Macron at the Ministry of Economics, where he contributed to the creation of Jeunes avec Macron and En Marche!, evolving into La République en marche in 2016. Following his involvement in Macron's 2017 presidential campaign, he was appointed political advisor at the Élysée Palace.

In 2018, he left the presidency to serve as campaign director and candidate on the LREM list for the 2019 European elections. Elected as a Member of the European Parliament, he went on to chair the Renew Europe group from 2021 to 2024. Concurrently, he returned to a national advisory role alongside Emmanuel Macron between 2020 and 2021, before becoming Secretary General of Renaissance in 2022, a position he held until December 2024.

During the formation of the Attal government in 2024, Séjourné was appointed Minister for Europe and Foreign Affairs, becoming, at 38, the youngest person in the history of the Fifth Republic to hold that office. He later joined the European Commission in December 2024, succeeding Thierry Breton.

== Early life and education ==
Stéphane Séjourné was born on March 26, 1985 in Versailles. His father worked for France Télécom and his mother was a switchboard operator, he grew up successively in the Yvelines, in Mexico, in Madrid, and then in Buenos Aires, where he obtained his baccalaureate.

It was in Argentina, in 2001, while the country was sinking into an economic crisis, that he decided to engage in politics within the Socialist Party, "because it was the only organization that had an international structure."

After obtaining his baccalaureate in 2005, he returned to France, entered the University of Poitiers and obtained a bachelor's degree in economic and social administration (AES), then a master's degree in public law and a master's degree in European law in 2011.

== Early political career ==
Séjourné was active in student politics within the National Union of Students of France (UNEF) and the Young Socialists, he took part in the blockade of the University of Poitiers and in the occupation of MEDEF premises in 2006, during the social movement against the First Employment Contract (CPE).

From July 2007 to September 2009, he worked as a parliamentary assistant, also taking part in Ségolène Royal's campaign for the 2007 presidential election. After the victory of François Hollande in 2012, he joined the cabinet of Jean-Paul Huchon, president of the Regional Council of Île-de-France.

In October 2014, he became a ministerial advisor to Emmanuel Macron at the Ministry of Economics. After Macron’s victory in the 2017 election, Séjourné became political advisor at the Élysée. After Macron’s re-election in 2022, he remained among his closest political allies, and helped negotiate the creation of the Ensemble coalition uniting the presidential majority.

== Political career ==
=== Member of the European Parliament, 2019–2024 ===
In 2018, Séjourné left the Élysée to lead the La République en marche campaign for the 2019 European elections, where he was elected as an MEP. He later became head of the French delegation within Renew Europe.

During his parliamentary tenure, he served on several committees, including the Committee on Legal Affairs, the Special Committee on Artificial Intelligence in a Digital Age, and the Committee on Women's Rights and Gender Equality. He also participated in interparliamentary delegations and policy groups focusing on artificial intelligence, children's rights, cancer, and digital issues. Following the resignation of Dacian Cioloș in 2021, Séjourné successfully ran for the leadership of Renew Europe. In 2022, he was also elected Secretary General of Renaissance, succeeding Stanislas Guerini.

When Jacek Saryusz-Wolski, a Polish MEP who had led the PiS coalition list in the European elections, launched a petition calling on Emmanuel Macron to "stop the violence of the authorities of the French Republic against citizens at the Yellow Vest protests," Séjourné issued a response defending the law enforcement policy used in handling the protests.

In February 2021, in an op-ed published in Le Journal du dimanche, he took a stance against the Comprehensive Agreement on Investment (CAI) between the European Union and China. He stated that he would not support it until China ratified the fundamental conventions of the International Labour Organization concerning forced labor.

On 12 November 2023, he took part in the March for the Republic and Against Antisemitism in Paris in response to the rise of anti-Semitism in France since the start of the Gaza war. In 2024, Séjourné committed not to work with the far-right in the next European Parliament and refused to align with the European Conservatives and Reformists (ECR) group.

=== Minister for Europe and Foreign Affairs, 2024 ===
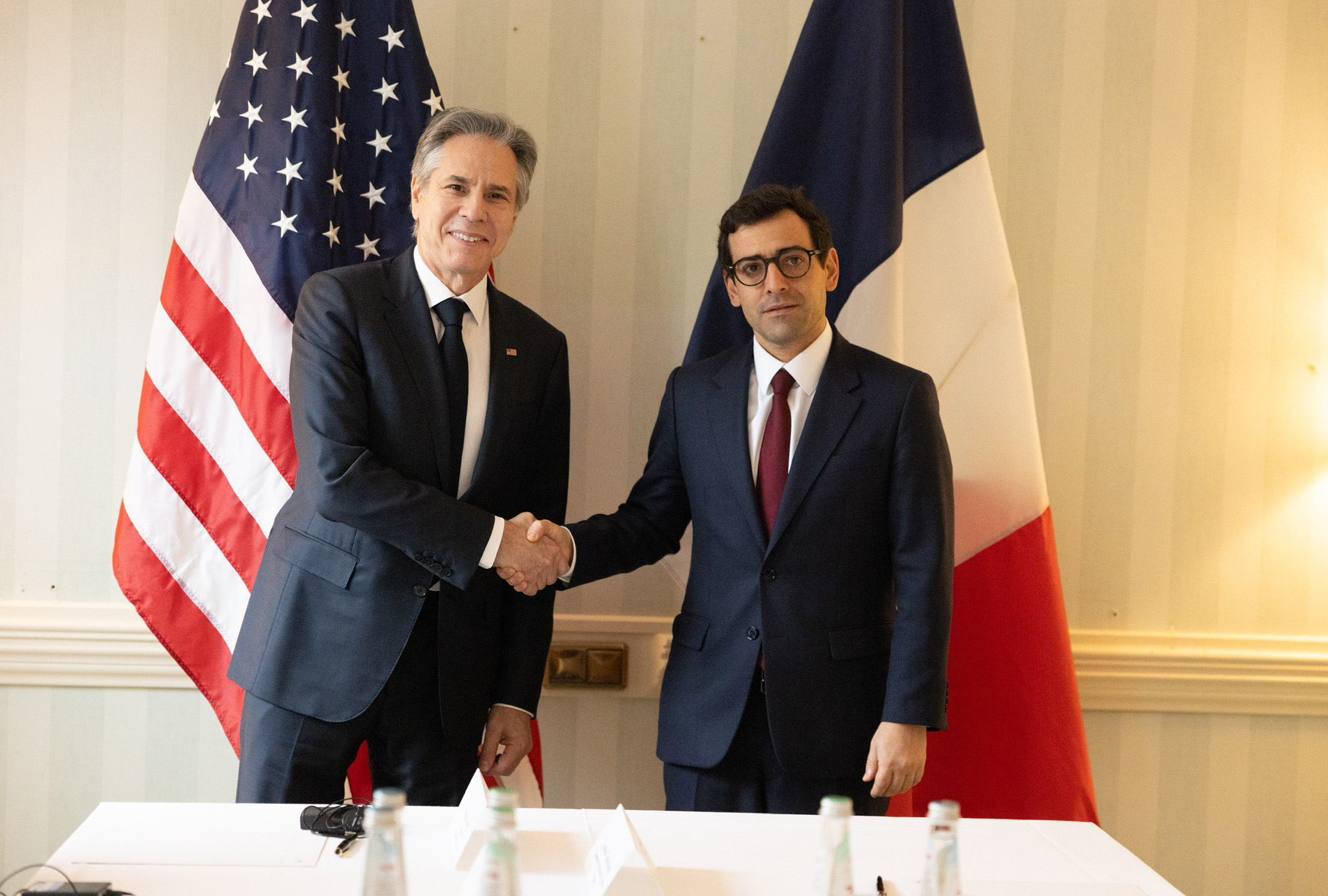
Séjourné with US Secretary of State Antony Blinken in February 2024

On 11 January 2024, Séjourné was appointed Minister for Europe and Foreign Affairs in Gabriel Attal's government. He became the youngest person to hold this position under the Fifth Republic. His first official foreign visit was to Germany for a meeting with his counterpart Annalena Baerbock.

Séjourné criticized South Africa's ICJ genocide case against Israel, saying "To accuse the Jewish state of genocide is to cross a moral threshold." Following Iran's attack on Israel in April 2024, he requested that the Iranian ambassador be summoned.

The same year, Séjourné stood for election in Hauts-de-Seine's 9th constituency.

=== European Commission, 2024–2029 ===
Following the resignation of Thierry Breton, Séjourné was nominated as France's candidate for the second Commission led by Ursula von der Leyen. He took office on 1 December 2024, as Executive Vice-President for Prosperity and Industrial Strategy, becoming Commissioner for Industry, SMEs and the Single Market.

In May 2025, he called on the Czech Republic to suspend a nuclear contract with Korea Electric Power Corporation (KEPCO), arguing that foreign subsidies could distort competition within the EU. The move sparked controversy and was interpreted by some as favoring the French Électricité de France (EDF).

== Personal life ==
Séjourné is openly gay and was in a civil union (PACS) with Gabriel Attal from 2017, a French politician who served as the Prime Minister of France from January to September 2024. In 2018, he was the victim of an outing on Twitter by Juan Branco. The relationship had ended by 2022. They got back together in 2024.

He has stated that he has suffered from very severe dyslexia since youth. This has resulted in him being criticized and mocked on social media for making grammatical errors several times when speaking. The Times reported that Alba Ventura, an influential commentator at RTL Radio, said that his grammatical mistakes are unacceptable, as the post requires the "correct use of French. He is representative of France, and to a certain extent the French language as well.".

Party political offices
Preceded by Dacian Cioloș	Leader of Renew Europe; 2021–2024	Succeeded by Valérie Hayer
Political offices
Preceded by Catherine Colonna	Minister for Europe and Foreign Affairs; 2024	Succeeded by Jean-Noël Barrot
Preceded by Thierry Breton	French European Commissioner; Since 2024	Incumbent
Preceded by Thierry Breton	European Commissioner for Prosperity and Industrial Strategy; Since 2024	Incumbent
