= Pierre-Henri Carbonnel =

French politician (born 1990)

Member of the French National Assembly for Tarn-et-Garonne's 1st constituency
- Incumbent
- Assumed office 12 October 2025
- Preceded by: Brigitte Barèges

Personal details
- Born: March 23, 1990 (age 36) Montauban, France
- Party: Union of the Right for the Republic

Pierre-Henri Carbonnel (born 23 March 1990) is a French politician serving as a member of the National Assembly since 2025. He is a municipal councillor of Saint-Cirq.
