= Jean-Pierre Cave =

French politician (1952–2017)

- Born: 20 February 1952; Montauban, France
- Died: 28 March 2017 (aged 65); Montauban, France
- Occupation: Politician
- Political party: Union for French Democracy

Jean-Pierre Cave (IPA: [ʒɑ̃ pjɛʁ kav]; 20 February 1952 – 28 March 2017) was a French politician. He served as a member of the National Assembly from 1993 to 1997, representing Tarn-et-Garonne.
