= Arnaud Sanvert =

French politician (born 1983)

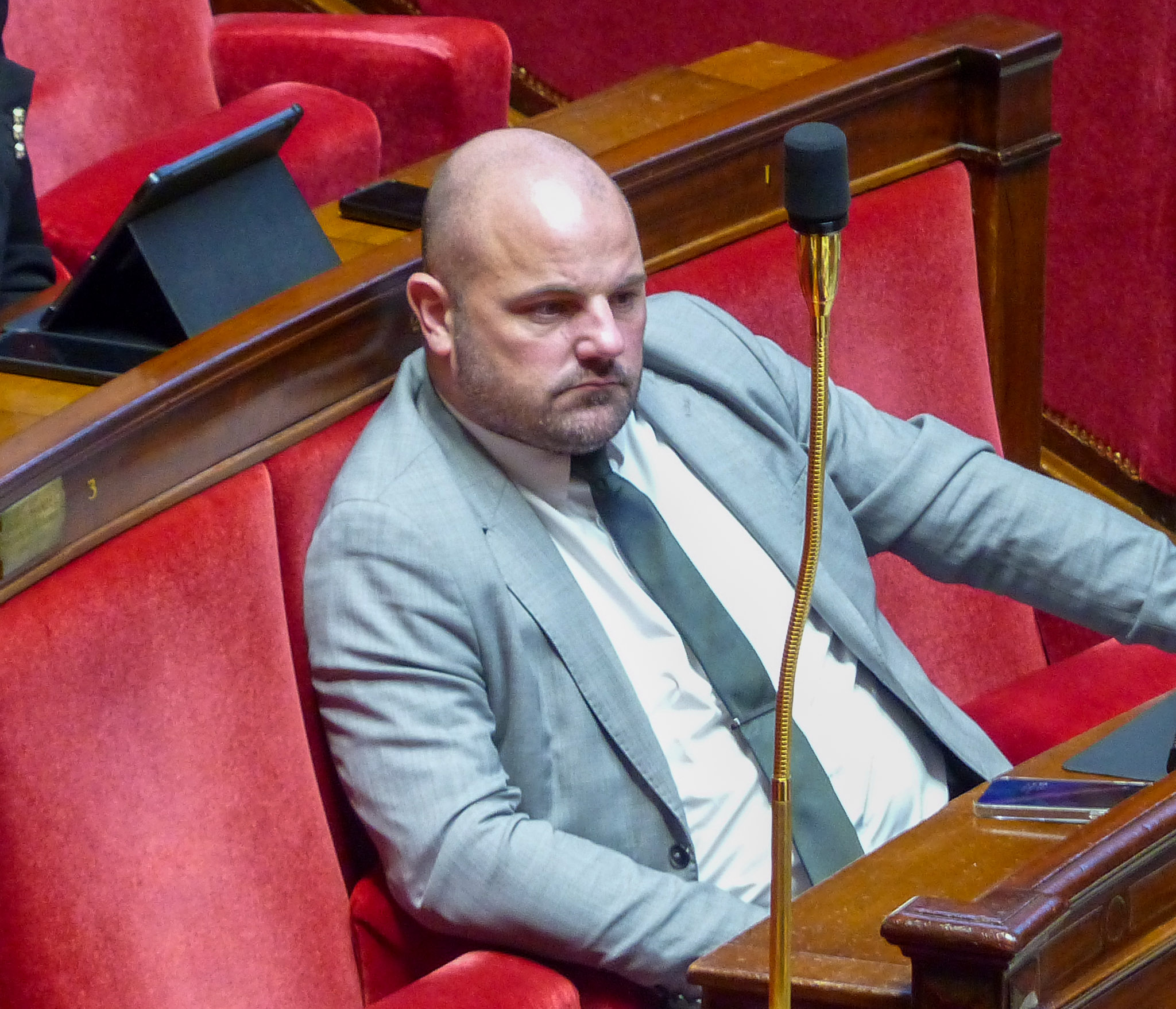
- Sanvert in 2025

Member of the National Assembly for Saône-et-Loire's 5th constituency
- In office 8 July 2024 – 7 March 2025
- Preceded by: Louis Margueritte
- Succeeded by: Sébastien Martin

Personal details
- Born: 3 August 1983 (age 42) Saint-Rémy, France
- Party: National Rally

Arnaud Sanvert (French pronunciation: [aʁno sɑ̃vɛʁ]; born 3 August 1983) is a French politician of the National Rally (RN). In the 2024 legislative election, he was elected to the National Assembly for the 5th constituency of the Saône-et-Loire department. He previously worked as a night porter at a hotel in Puligny-Montrachet, and was a candidate for the constituency in the 2022 legislative election.

His election is invalidated by the Constitutional Council due to irregularities in the first round. Sanvert was defeated by Sébastien Martin in the second round of the by-election on 25 May 2025.
