= Gilles Platret =

French politician (born 1973)

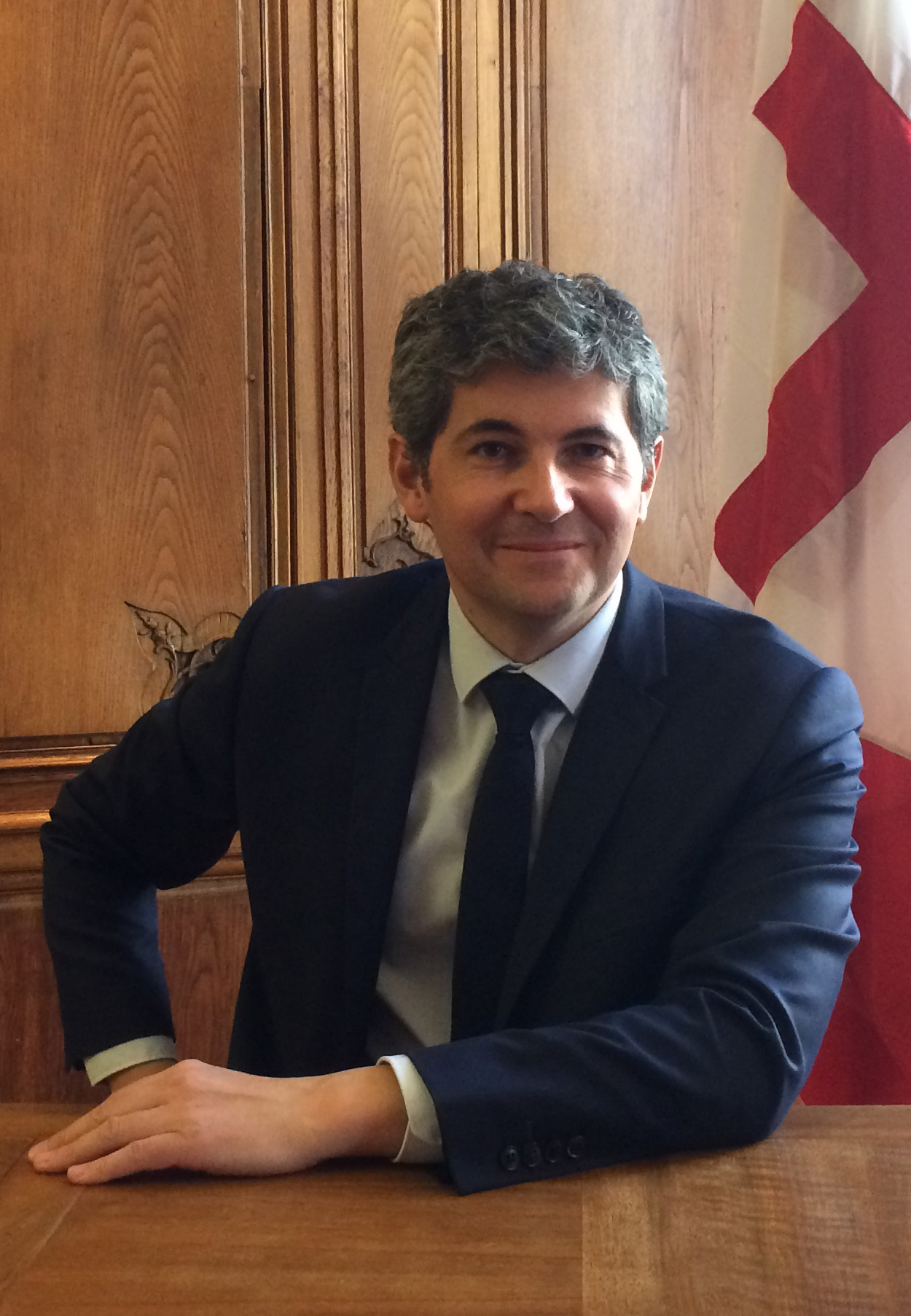
- Platret in 2017

Mayor of Chalon-sur-Saône
- Incumbent
- Assumed office 29 March 2014
- Preceded by: Christophe Sirugue

Member of the Regional Council of Bourgogne-Franche-Comté
- Incumbent
- Assumed office 4 January 2016

Personal details
- Born: 19 April 1973 (age 53) Saint-Rémy, France
- Party: Miscellaneous right (2024–present)
- Other political affiliations: Union for a Popular Movement (until 2015); The Republicans (2015–2024)
- Education: Sciences Po; Paris-Sorbonne University

Gilles Platret (French pronunciation: [ʒil platʁɛ]; born 19 April 1973) is a French politician who has served as Mayor of Chalon-sur-Saône since 2014. From 2019 to 2023, he served as a vice president of The Republicans (LR), after having been appointed a spokesperson for the party in 2017.

Platret has been a member of the Regional Council of Bourgogne-Franche-Comté since 2016, and was the lead candidate of The Republicans in the 2021 regional election. In 2017, 2022 and 2024, he unsuccessfully ran for the National Assembly in the 5th constituency of Saône-et-Loire.
