= Louis Margueritte =

French politician (born 1984)

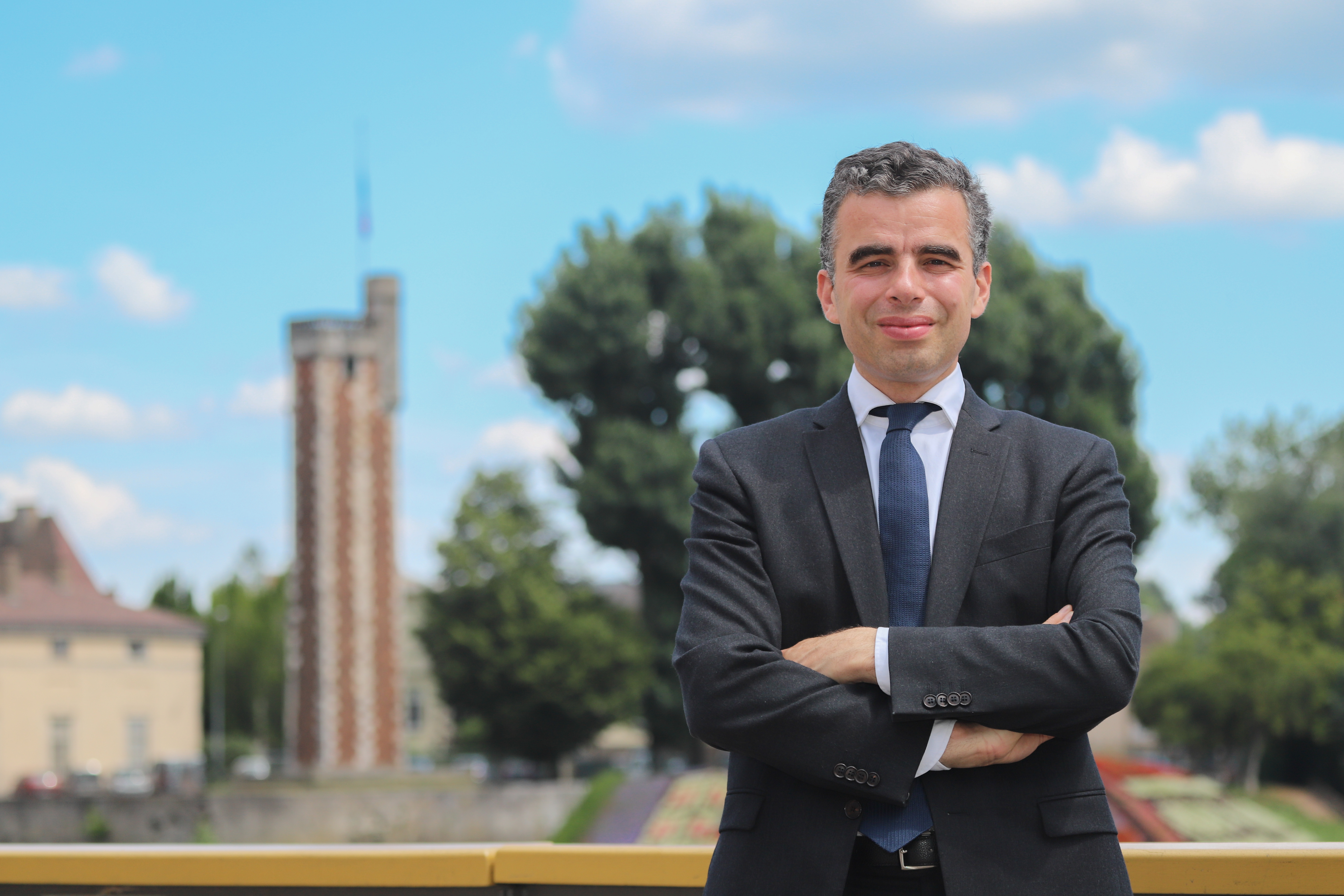

Member of the National Assembly for Saône-et-Loire's 5th constituency
- In office 20 June 2022 – 9 June 2024
- Preceded by: Raphaël Gauvain
- Succeeded by: Arnaud Sanvert

Personal details
- Born: 10 September 1984 (age 41) Paris, France
- Party: Renaissance
- Other political affiliations: Union for a Popular Movement; The Republicans (both formerly)
- Education: Lycée Louis-le-Grand
- Alma mater: École polytechnique
- Occupation: Civil servant

Louis Margueritte (French pronunciation: [lwi maʁɡəʁit]; born 10 September 1984) is a French politician and civil servant who represented the 5th constituency of the Saône-et-Loire department in the National Assembly from 2022 to 2024. He is a member of Renaissance (RE).

== Early career ==
Before entering politics, Margueritte worked at the French Treasury.

== Political career ==
In parliament, Margueritte served on the Finance Committee.

In 2025, Margueritte was appointed deputy chief of staff to Prime Minister François Bayrou.

== Political positions ==
Margueritte is considered to be part of his parliamentary group's conservative wing.

== See also ==
- List of deputies of the 16th National Assembly of France
