= Valérie Rabault =

French politician

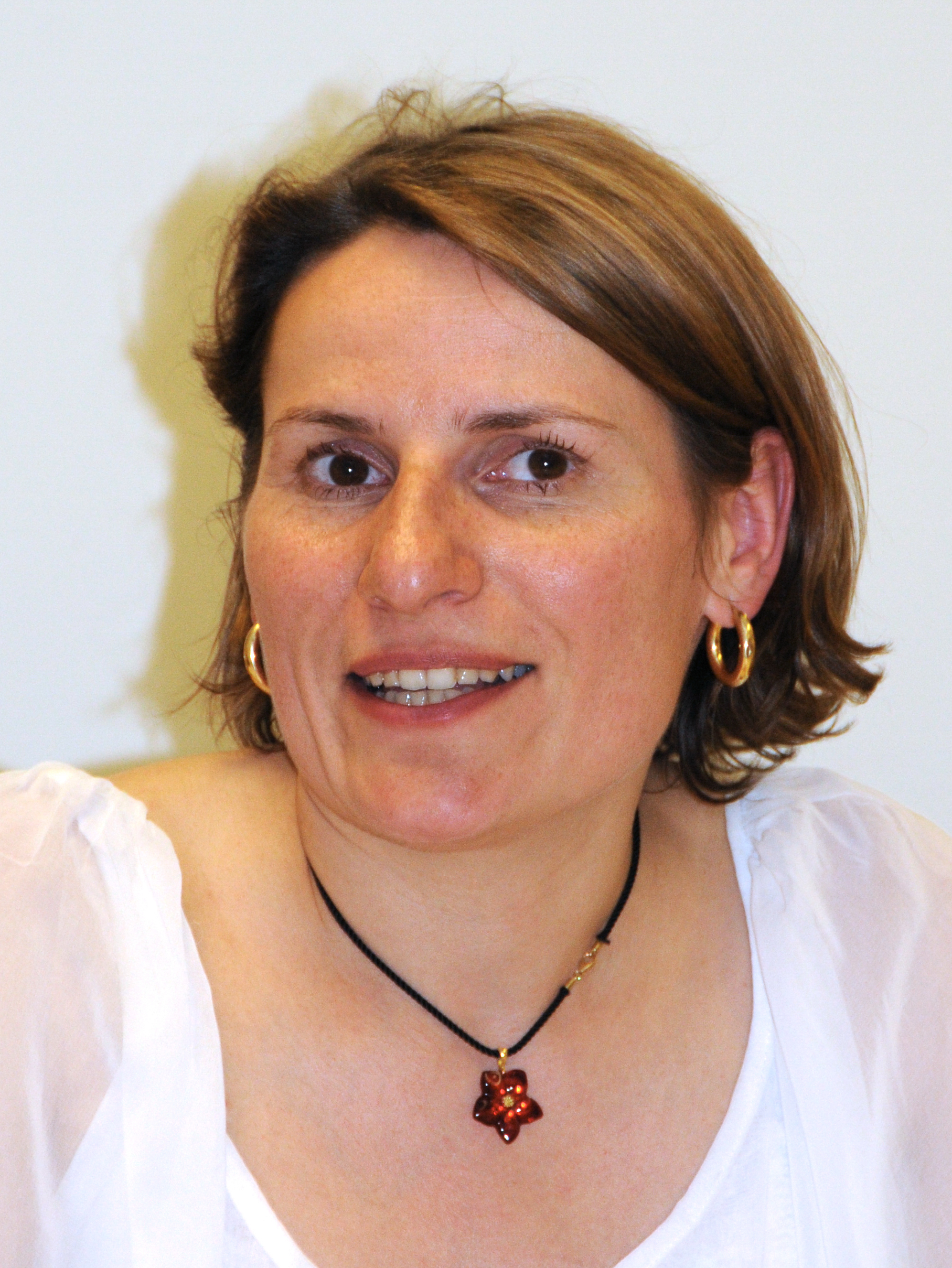
- Rabault in 2011

First Vice-president of the National Assembly
- In office 22 June 2022 – 9 June 2024
- President: Yaël Braun-Pivet
- Preceded by: Annie Genevard

Member of the National Assembly
- In office 20 June 2012 – 9 June 2024
- Preceded by: Brigitte Barèges
- Succeeded by: Brigitte Barèges
- Parliamentary group: SOC
- Constituency: Tarn-et-Garonne's 1st constituency

President of the Socialist group in the National Assembly
- In office 11 April 2018 – 21 June 2022
- Preceded by: Olivier Faure
- Succeeded by: Boris Vallaud

Budget General Reporter of the National Assembly
- In office 22 April 2014 – 20 June 2017
- Preceded by: Christian Eckert
- Succeeded by: Joël Giraud

Member of Departmental Council of Tarn-et-Garonne
- Incumbent
- Assumed office 1 July 2021
- Preceded by: Véronique Riols
- Constituency: Canton of Aveyron-Lère

Municipal councillor of Montauban and member of the Council of Grand Montauban
- In office 4 April 2014 – 5 July 2020

Personal details
- Born: 25 April 1973 (age 53) L'Haÿ-les-Roses, France
- Party: Socialist Party
- Education: Lycée Louis-le-Grand
- Alma mater: École des ponts ParisTech
- Occupation: Engineer

Valérie Rabault (French: [valeʁi ʁabo]; born 25 April 1973) is a French engineer and politician of the Socialist Party (PS) who has presided over the Socialists and affiliated group in the National Assembly since 2018. She has represented the 1st constituency of the Tarn-et-Garonne department in Parliament from 2012 to 2024. She was vice president of the National Assembly from 2022 to 2024.

== Early life and career ==
Rabault attended the École des ponts ParisTech from 1994 to 1998. At the same time, she obtained an MBA from the Collège des Ingénieurs in 1998.

Rabault entered the private sector as a construction manager and then became involved in project financing. She then practiced her professional activity in the banking sector by becoming an inspector at Société Générale, then in 2003, was recruited by BNP Paribas London in the risk monitoring teams. In 2005, she joined the Paris office; from 2010, she became head of risk planning in the equity and commodities division of BNP Paribas Investment Bank. She resigned in June 2012 following her election to the National Assembly.

== Political career ==
=== Career in local politics ===
Rabault became a member of the Socialist Party in 2000. From 2002 to 2005, she was a member of the London PS section. Back in France, she joined the federal council of PS section of Tarn-et-Garonne in 2006. In 2012, at the Toulouse congress, she was elected 1st federal secretary of the Socialist Party of Tarn-et-Garonne.

In the 2014 municipal election, Rabault was elected to be a member of Montauban's municipal council. Following the 2020 municipal election, she became a municipal councillor of Piquecos. In the 2021 departmental election, she was also elected to the Departmental Council of Tarn-et-Garonne for the canton of Aveyron-Lère.

=== Member of the National Assembly, 2012–2024 ===
After the vote of the militant base, Rabault was appointed by the Socialist Party as its candidate in the 2012 legislative election in the 1st constituency of Tarn-et-Garonne. She was elected to office on 17 June 2012 against Union for a Popular Movement candidate Brigitte Barèges. She is a member and elected in 2012 vice president of the Committee on Finance, General Economy and Budget of the National Assembly. In April 2014, she refused to enter the government of Prime Minister Manuel Valls as Secretary of State for Trade. Instead, she succeeded Christian Eckert as the Parliament's general rapporteur on the national budget, making her the first woman in that position.

In 2017, Rabault was in charge of the economy and finance policies of Vincent Peillon's campaign for the Socialist Party presidential primary. She was also a member of his political campaign committee. In the 2017 legislative election, Rabault was reelected as a deputy of Tarn-et-Garonne with over 55% of the second round vote against En Marche! candidate Pierre Mardegan. He had placed first in the first round. She supported Olivier Faure's candidacy for the position of first secretary of the Socialist Party's 2018 convention.

On 8 July 2017, Rabault joined the Socialist Party's national leadership team. On 11 April 2018, Rabault became chairwoman of the Socialist group in the National Assembly, becoming the first woman to hold the position permanently, as Seybah Dagoma held the office in an acting capacity in 2016 after the appointment of Bruno Le Roux as Minister of the Interior.

On 3 May 2022, it was reported that Rabault had turned down President Emmanuel Macron's offer to make her Prime Minister of France over policy differences.

In 2023, Rabault publicly endorsed Nicolas Mayer-Rossignol as candidate to succeed Olivier Faure at the Socialist Party's leadership.

== See also ==
- 2012 French legislative election
- 2017 French legislative election
- Tarn-et-Garonne's 1st constituency
