= Saône-et-Loire's 5th constituency =

Constituency of the French Fifth Republic

5th constituency of Saône-et-Loire
- inline Constituency of the National Assembly of France

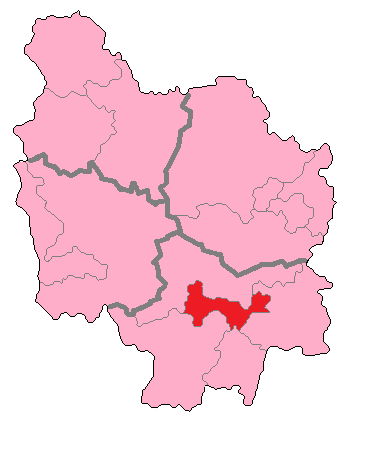
- Saône-et-Loire's 5th Constituency shown within Burgundy
- Deputy: Sébastien Martin; LR
- Department: Saône-et-Loire
- Cantons: Buxy, Chalon-sur-Saône-Centre, Chalon-sur-Saône-Ouest, Chalon-sur-Saône-Sud, Montceau-les-Mines-Nord, Montceau-les-Mines-Sud, Montcenis, Montchanin
- Registered voters: 89,981

The 5th constituency of the Saône-et-Loire is a French legislative constituency in the Saône-et-Loire département.

== Description ==
The 5th constituency of the Saône-et-Loire covers the centre of the department and includes the majority of Chalon-sur-Saône as well as the town of Montceau-les-Mines noted for its now closed coal mines. Montceau-les-Mines was only added to the seat following the 2010 redistricting of French legislative constituencies.

In 2002, Dominique Perben is appointed Minister, and is replaced by his substitute, Dominique Juillot.

The seat was won by Christophe Sirugue of the PS in 2007 ending 19 years of conservative control.

== Historic Representation ==
Election	Member	Party
1986	Proportional representation – no election by constituency	
1988	Dominique Perben	RPR
1993	Dominique Perben	RPR
1993	Jean-Paul Emorine	RPR
1995	André Gentien	RPR
1997	Dominique Perben	RPR
2002	Dominique Perben	UMP
2002	Dominique Juillot	UMP
2007	Christophe Sirugue	PS
2012	Christophe Sirugue	PS
2017	Raphaël Gauvain	LREM
2022	Louis Margueritte	LREM
2024	Arnaud Sanvert	RN

== Election results ==
=== 2025 by-election ===
Due to the invalidation in March 2025 of that of 2024, a partial legislative election took place on May 18, 2025 (with a second round on the 25th of the same month).

Candidate	Party and coalition	Alliance	First round		Second round	
Candidate	Party and coalition	Alliance	Votes	%	Votes	%
Arnaud Sanvert	RN	RN	8,797	31.92	11,018	41.40
Sébastien Martin	LR	DVD	7,056	25.60	15,596	58.60
Clément Mugnier	PS	PS	4,680	16.98		
Marie-Claude Jarrot	Horizons	ENS	3,436	12.47		
Fatima Kouriche	LFI	UG	2,260	8.20		
Alexandre Hinger	Parti de la France	DXD	570	2.07		
Pascal Dufraigne	Lutte Ouvrière	DXG	381	1.38		
Nathalie Szych	The Patriots	DXD	328	1.19		
Alain Cadiot	Independent	Ind	50	0.18		
Suffrages exprimés			27,558	97.78	26,614	94.09
Votes cast			27,558	97.78	26,614	94.09
Blank votes			412	1.46	1,090	3.85
Invalid votes			214	0.76	582	2.06
Total			28,184	100	28,286	100
Abstention			57,923	67.27	57,332	66.96
Registered / participation			86,109	32.73	85,618	33.04

=== 2024 ===
Legislative Election 2024: Saône-et-Loire's 5th constituency
Party	Candidate	Votes	%	±%
DVD	Gilles Platret	10,746	19.05	N/A
DVD	Alain Cadiot	125	0.22	N/A
LFI (NFP)	Fatima Kouriche	13,130	23.28	−0.32
LO	Pascal Dufraigne	888	1.57	N/A
RN	Arnaud Sanvert	19,807	35.12	+16.10
RE (Ensemble)	Louis Margueritte	11,699	20.74	−2.97
Turnout		56,395	97.38	+50.37
Registered electors		85,943		
2nd round result
RN	Arnaud Sanvert	22,657	40.57	N/A
LFI	Fatima Kouriche	17,591	31.50	−15.84
Turnout		55,841	95.28	+51.75
Registered electors		85,972		
RN gain from RE				

=== 2022 ===
Legislative Election 2022: Saône-et-Loire's 5th constituency
Party	Candidate	Votes	%	±%
LREM (Ensemble)	Louis Margueritte	9,578	23.71	-6.38
LFI (NUPÉS)	Eric Riboulet	9,534	23.60	-8.66
LR (UDC)	Gilles Platret	8,516	21.08	+1.42
RN	Arnaud Sanvert	7,682	19.02	+6.00
PRG	Tristan-Ludovic Bathiard	2,061	5.10	N/A
REC	Denis Goubeault	1,139	2.82	N/A
Others	N/A	1,885	-	−
Turnout		40,395	47.01	+1.06
2nd round result
LREM (Ensemble)	Louis Margueritte	17,893	52.66	-2.43
LFI (NUPÉS)	Eric Riboulet	16,085	47.34	N/A
Turnout		33,978	43.53	+8.86
LREM hold				

=== 2017 ===
Legislative Election 2017: Saône-et-Loire's 5th constituency
Party	Candidate	Votes	%	±%
LREM	Raphaël Gauvain	12,443	30.09	
LR	Gilles Platret	8,131	19.66	
PS	Christophe Sirugue	6,463	15.63	
FN	Nathalie Szych	5,382	13.02	
LFI	Eric Riboulet	4,721	11.42	
EELV	François Lotteau	1,139	2.75	
PCF	Nathalie Vermorel	1,017	2.46	
Others	N/A	2,053		
Turnout		41,349	45.95	
2nd round result
LREM	Raphaël Gauvain	17,189	55.09	
LR	Gilles Platret	14,012	44.91	
Turnout		31,201	34.67	
LREM gain from PS				

=== 2012 ===
Legislative Election 2012: Saône-et-Loire's 5th constituency
Party	Candidate	Votes	%	±%
PS	Christophe Sirugue	22,415	44.82	
PRV	Isabelle Dechaume	11,768	23.53	
FN	Christian Launay	8,804	17.60	
FG	Jacky Dubois	2,848	5.69	
AC	Karine Delorme	1,765	3.53	
EELV	Abdoulkader Atteye	1,216	2.43	
Others	N/A	1,194		
Turnout		50,010	54.89	
2nd round result
PS	Christophe Sirugue	27,430	59.26	
PRV	Isabelle Dechaume	18,857	40.74	
Turnout		46,287	50.80	
PS hold				

=== 2007 ===
Legislative Election 2007: Saône-et-Loire's 5th constituency
Party	Candidate	Votes	%	±%
UMP	Dominique Juillot	17,182	44.92	
PS	Christophe Sirugue	13,545	35.41	
MoDem	Jean-François Le Guen	2,370	6.20	
FN	Bernadette Bessire	1,573	4.11	
PCF	Marie-Pierre Lebeau	856	2.24	
Others	N/A	2,723	-	
Turnout		38,833	60.12	
2nd round result
PS	Christophe Sirugue	19,488	50.30	
UMP	Dominique Juillot	19,256	49.70	
Turnout		39,728	61.51	
PS gain from UMP				

=== 2002 ===
Legislative Election 2002: Saône-et-Loire's 5th constituency
Party	Candidate	Votes	%	±%
UMP	Dominique Perben	19,447	49.63	
PS	Bettina Laville	11,088	28.30	
FN	Bernadette Bessire	3,936	10.04	
PCF	Marie-Claude Martin	1,187	3.03	
LV	Marie-Claude Colin-Cordier	1,181	3.01	
MNR	Jean Coupat	775	1.98	
LO	Pascal Dufraigne	630	1.61	
PR	Samuel Brandily	456	1.16	
MEI	Guy Lefebvre	375	0.96	
DIV	Emmanuel Vidal-Soler	111	0.28	
Turnout		39,922	64.06	
2nd round result
UMP	Dominique Perben	20,503	59.59	
PS	Bettina Laville	13,903	40.41	
Turnout		35,779	57.42	
UMP hold				

=== 1997 ===
Legislative Election 1997: Saône-et-Loire's 5th constituency
Party	Candidate	Votes	%	±%
RPR	Dominique Perben	14,692	37.81	
PS	Bettina Laville	10,906	28.07	
FN	Jean Coupat	5,284	13.60	
PCF	Michel Chevalier	3,138	8.08	
LV	Alain Cordier	1,652	4.25	
LDI	Joël Juillet	1,299	3.34	
LO	Pascal Dufraigne	1,063	2.74	
GE	Patrick Tixidre	824	2.12	
Turnout		41,047	67.61	
2nd round result
RPR	Dominique Perben	20,782	51.04	
PS	Bettina Laville	19,938	48.96	
Turnout		43,148	71.08	
RPR hold				

== Sources ==
- Official results of French elections from 2002: "Résultats électoraux officiels en France" (in French).
