= Laurence Sailliet =

French politician (born 1973)

Laurence Sailliet MEP
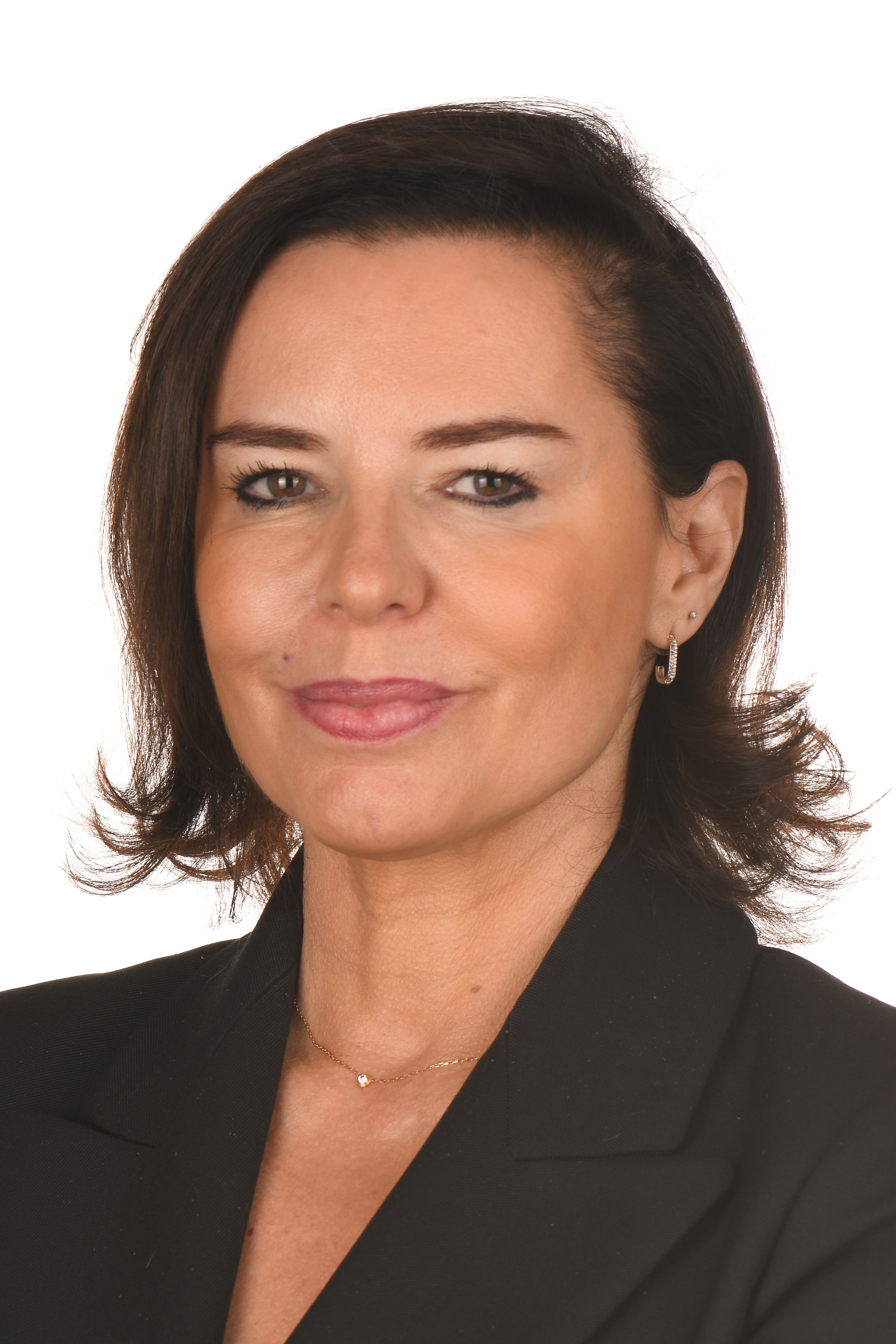

Member of the European Parliament for France
- In office 24 September 2023 – 2024
- Preceded by: Agnès Evren

Personal details
- Born: 1 March 1973 (age 53) Thionville, France
- Party: Republican

Laurence Sailliet (born 1 March 1973) is a French politician from The Republicans who briefly served as a Member of the European Parliament from 2023 to 2024. She replaced Agnès Evren.

== See also ==
- List of members of the European Parliament (2019–2024)
