= 2025 United States ballot measures =

- March 29 to November 4, 2025

Part of the 2025 United States elections

This article lists state and local ballot measures which were voted on during the 2025 calendar year.

Thirty statewide ballot measures were certified for the ballot as of August 16. According to Ballotpedia, the average number of statewide ballot measures held during each odd-numbered year was between 33 and 34.

== By state ==
=== California ===
Origin	Status	Measure	Description (Result of a "yes" vote)	Date	Yes	No
Legislature	Approved	Proposition 50	Amend the California Constitution to allow the state to use a new congressional district map for 2026 through 2030.	Nov 4	7,453,339; 64.42%	4,116,998; 35.58%

=== Colorado ===
Origin	Status	Measure	Description (Result of a "yes" vote)	Date	Yes	No
Legislature	Approved	Colorado Allow State to Retain Revenue From Proposition FF Measure	Allow for the state to retain and spend tax revenue collected above the $100,727,820 annual estimate for Proposition FF and continuing to dedicate revenue to the Healthy School Meals for All Program.	Nov 4	1,107,376; 66.15%	566,563; 33.85%
Legislature	Approved	Tax Deductions and Revenue for School Meals Measure	Lower the state income tax deduction limits for taxpayers earning $300,000 or more from $12,000 to $1,000 for single filers and from $16,000 to $2,000 for joint filers with the additional $95 million annual revenue applied towards the Healthy School Meals for All Program.	Nov 4	1,010,644; 59.73%	681,400; 40.27%

=== Louisiana ===
In Louisiana, ballot measures need a simple majority of the vote to pass.

Origin	Status	Measure	Description (Result of a "yes" vote)	Date	Yes	No
Legislature	Failed	Amendment 1	Gives the Louisiana Supreme Court original jurisdiction to discipline out-of-state lawyers; allows the state legislature to create courts with limited or specialized jurisdiction by a two-thirds vote.	Mar 29	221,355; 34.94%	412,108; 65.06%
Legislature	Failed	Amendment 2	Reduces the maximum income tax rate; increases income tax deductions for individuals 65 and older; establishes a government growth limit; and permanently increases teacher salaries.	Mar 29	224,109; 35.34%	410,107; 64.66%
Legislature	Failed	Amendment 3	Gives the state legislature the authority to determine which crimes can result in a juvenile being tried as an adult.	Mar 29	212,343; 33.61%	419,392; 66.39%
Legislature	Failed	Amendment 4	Requires that judicial vacancies be filled by special election at the earliest possible date; rather than current law requiring that vacancies be filled by special election within twelve months.	Mar 29	229,620; 36.38%	401,524; 63.62%

=== Maine ===
In Maine, ballot measures need a simple majority of the vote to pass.

Origin	Status	Measure	Description (Result of a "yes" vote)	Date	Yes	No
Citizens	Failed	Maine Question 1	Requires a voter to present photo identification to vote and curtails access to absentee voting.	Nov 4	175,751; 35.81%	315,008; 64.19%
Citizens	Approved	Maine Question 2	Allows residents to obtain an extreme risk protection order.	Nov 4	307,911; 62.90%	181,601; 37.10%

=== New York ===
In New York, ballot measures need a simple majority of the vote to pass.

Origin	Status	Measure	Description (Result of a "yes" vote)	Date	Yes	No
Legislature	Approved	Mount Van Hoevenberg Olympic Sports Complex Amendment	Authorizes the construction, operation, and maintenance of the Mount Van Hoevenberg Olympic Sports Complex on forest preserve land in Essex County, and increases the size of the forest preserve.	Nov 4	1,932,337; 52.09%	1,777,036; 47.91%

=== Ohio ===
In Ohio, ballot measures need a simple majority of the vote to pass.

Origin	Status	Measure	Description (Result of a "yes" vote)	Date	Yes	No
Legislature	Approved	Local Public Infrastructure Bond Amendment	Allows the state to issue up to $2.5 billion in general obligation bonds with a limit of $250 million in a year to assist local governments in funding public infrastructure projects.	May 6	593,691; 67.81%	281,862; 32.19%

=== Texas ===
In Texas, ballot measures need a simple majority of the vote to pass.

Origin	Status	Measure	Description (Result of a "yes" vote)	Date	Yes	No
Legislature	Approved	Texas Proposition 1, Establish Special Funds for State Technical College System Amendment	Amend the state constitution to establish the Permanent Technical Institution Infrastructure Fund (Permanent Fund) and the Available Workforce Education Fund (Available Fund) as special funds outside of the General Revenue fund to support the capital needs of the Texas State Technical College system.	Nov 4	2,054,008; 69.18%	915,238; 30.82%
Legislature	Approved	Texas Proposition 2, Prohibit Capital Gains Tax on Individuals, Estates, and Trusts Amendment	Amend the state constitution to prohibit the state legislature from enacting a tax on realized or unrealized capital gains of an individual, family, estate, or trust, including a tax on the sale or transfer of a capital asset.	Nov 4	1,952,360; 65.66%	1,021,001; 34.34%
Legislature	Approved	Texas Proposition 3, Denial of Bail for Certain Violent or Sexual Offenses Punishable as a Felony Amendment	Amend the state constitution to deny bail to individuals accused of certain violent or sexual offenses punishable as a felony.	Nov 4	1,822,342; 61.39%	1,145,919; 38.61%
Legislature	Approved	Texas Proposition 4, Allocate Portion of Sales Tax Revenue to Water Fund Amendment	Amend the state constitution to allocate the first $1 billion per fiscal year of sales tax revenue after it exceeds $46.5 billion to the state water fund and authorize the state legislature, by a two-thirds vote, to adjust the amount allocated.	Nov 4	2,088,099; 70.57%	870,688; 29.43%
Legislature	Approved	Texas Proposition 5, Property Tax Exemption on Retail Animal Feed Amendment	Amend the state constitution to authorize the state legislature to pass a property tax exemption on animal feed held by the property owner for retail sale.	Nov 4	1,860,575; 63.87%	1,052,678; 36.13%
Legislature	Approved	Texas Proposition 6, Prohibit Taxes on Certain Securities Transactions Amendment	Amend the state constitution to prohibit laws that impose an occupation tax on a registered securities market operator or a securities transaction tax.	Nov 4	1,594,875; 54.95%	1,307,789; 45.05%
Legislature	Approved	Texas Proposition 7, Establish Homestead Exemption for Surviving Spouses of Veterans Killed by a Service-Connected Disease Amendment	Amend the state constitution to authorize the state legislature to establish a property tax exemption on all or part of the market value of the homestead of a surviving spouse of a veteran who died from a service-connected disease.	Nov 4	2,562,264; 86.65%	394,767; 13.35%
Legislature	Approved	Texas Proposition 8, Prohibit Estate Taxes and New Taxes on Estate Transfers, Inheritances, and Gifts Amendment	Amend the state constitution to prohibit the state legislature from imposing a tax on a decedent’s property or the transfer of an estate, inheritance, legacy, succession, or gift.	Nov 4	2,147,644; 72.25%	824,871; 27.75%
Legislature	Approved	Texas Proposition 9, Authorize $125,000 Tax Exemption for Tangible Property Used for Income Production Amendment	Amend the state constitution to authorize the state legislature to exempt $125,000 of the market value of personal tangible property used for income production from taxes.	Nov 4	1,909,242; 65.30%	1,014,660; 34.70%
Legislature	Approved	Texas Proposition 10, Property Tax Exemption for Improvements to Homestead Destroyed by Fire Amendment	Amend the state constitution to authorize the state legislature to provide a temporary homestead exemption for improvements made to residences destroyed by fire.	Nov 4	2,640,028; 89.29%	316,585; 10.71%
Legislature	Approved	Texas Proposition 11, Increase Homestead Tax Exemption for Elderly and Disabled Amendment	Amend the state constitution to increase the property tax exemption from $10,000 to $60,000 of the market value for homesteads owned by elderly or disabled individuals.	Nov 4	2,301,919; 77.71%	660,143; 22.29%
Legislature	Approved	Texas Proposition 12, Change Membership and Authority of State Commission on Judicial Conduct Amendment	Amend the state constitution to make changes to the states judicial oversight policies regarding the composition of the 13-member state Commission on Judicial Conduct, the composition of the tribunal that reviews the commission's recommendations, and the authority and process for sanctioning and removing judges.	Nov 4	1,803,779; 61.97%	1,106,817; 38.03%
Legislature	Approved	Texas Proposition 13, Increase Homestead Property Tax Exemption Amendment	Amend the state constitution to increase the property tax exemption from $100,000 to $140,000 of the market value of a homestead.	Nov 4	2,357,587; 79.47%	609,126; 20.53%
Legislature	Approved	Texas Proposition 14, Establish Dementia Prevention and Research Institute of Texas Amendment	Amend the state constitution to establish the Dementia Prevention and Research Institute of Texas with $3 billion from the general fund.	Nov 4	2,017,935; 68.59%	924,022; 31.41%
Legislature	Approved	Texas Proposition 15, Parental Rights Amendment	Amend the state constitution to provide that parents have the right "to exercise care, custody, and control of the parent’s child, including the right to make decisions concerning the child’s upbringing" and the responsibility "to nurture and protect the parent's child."	Nov 4	2,072,942; 69.90%	892,457; 30.10%
Legislature	Approved	Texas Proposition 16, Citizenship Voting Requirement Amendment	Amend the state constitution to provide that "persons who are not citizens of the United States" cannot vote in Texas.	Nov 4	2,140,409; 72.01%	832,137; 27.99%
Legislature	Approved	Texas Proposition 17, Property Tax Exemption for Border Security Infrastructure Amendment	Allow the Texas State Legislature to exempt from property taxes increases in a property's value—located in a county bordering Mexico—that results from building or installing border security infrastructure.	Nov 4	1,673,961; 57.67%	1,228,823; 42.33%

=== Washington ===
In Washington, ballot measures need a simple majority of the vote to pass.

Origin	Status	Measure	Description (Result of a "yes" vote)	Date	Yes	No
Legislature	Approved	Allow Investment of Long-Term Services and Supports Trust Fund Amendment	Allow the Long-Term Services and Supports (LTSS) Trust Fund to be invested in stocks and equities rather than being limited to fixed-income securities.	Nov 4	1,105,304; 57.82%	806,299; 42.18%

=== Wisconsin ===
In Wisconsin, ballot measures need a simple majority of the vote to pass.

Origin	Status	Measure	Description (Result of a "yes" vote)	Date	Yes	No
Legislature	Approved	Require Voter Photo Identification Amendment	Amends the state constitution to include the state's photo ID requirement.	April 1	1,437,326; 62.78%	852,107; 37.22%
