= 2025 local electoral calendar =

Worldwide local elections held in 2025

This local electoral calendar for 2025 lists the subnational elections held in 2025. Referendums, recall and retention elections, and national by-elections (special elections) are also included.

== January ==
- 7 January: United States, Virginia
  - 26th House of Delegates district, special election
  - 10th Senate district, special election
  - 32nd Senate district, special election
- 12 January:
  - France, Isère's 1st constituency, National Assembly by-election (1st round)
  - Hungary, Tolna County 2nd constituency, National Parliament by-election
- 14 January: Antigua and Barbuda, St. Peter, Parliament by-election
- 17–18 January, Czech Republic, Brno-City, Senate by-election
- 18 January: Taiwan, Nantou County, Caotun, Mayor
- 19 January:
  - Austria, Burgenland, Landtag
  - France, Isère's 1st constituency, National Assembly by-election (2nd round)
- 23 January: India, Uttarakhand, local elections
- 26 January: Cambodia, Sihanoukville, City Council elections (Indirect)
- 28 January: United States
  - Iowa, 35th Senate district, special election
  - Minnesota, 60th Senate district, special election
- 29 January: Azerbaijan, municipal elections

== February ==
- 1 February: Thailand, Provincial Administrative Organization
- 2 February: France, Hauts-de-Seine's 9th constituency, National Assembly by-election (1st round)
- 5 February: India
  - Delhi, Legislative Assembly
  - Tamil Nadu, Erode East, by-election
  - Uttar Pradesh, Milkipur, by-election
- 8 February: Australia, Victoria
  - Prahran, Legislative Assembly by-election
  - Werribee, Legislative Assembly by-election
- 9 February:
  - France, Hauts-de-Seine's 9th constituency, National Assembly by-election (2nd round)
  - Switzerland
    - Canton ballot initiatives
    - Appenzell Ausserrhoden, Executive Council by-election
    - Glarus, Executive Council by-election
- 11 February:
  - India, Chhattisgarh, local elections
  - United States
    - New York, Westchester County Executive special election
    - Oklahoma, Norman, Mayor
- 15 February: United States
  - Delaware
    - 1st Senate district, special election
    - 5th Senate district, special election
  - Louisiana
    - 14th State Senate district, special election
    - 23rd State Senate district, special election
- 16 February: India, Gujarat, Junagadh, Municipal Corporation
- 21 February: India, Meghalaya
  - Jaintia Hills Autonomous District Council
  - Khasi Hills Autonomous District Council
- 25 February: United States
  - California
    - 32nd State Assembly district, special election
    - 36th Senate district, special election
  - Connecticut
    - 40th House of Representatives district, special election
    - 21st State Senate district, special election
  - Maine, 24th House of Representatives district, special election
- 27 February: Canada, Ontario, Legislative Assembly

== March ==
- 2 March:
  - Germany, Hamburg, Parliament
  - India, Haryana, local elections
  - Switzerland, Valais, Council of State and Grand Council
- 4 March:
  - Micronesia, Chuuk, Governor
  - United States
    - Colorado, Aspen, Mayor
    - Tennessee, Chattanooga, Mayor
    - Alabama, Tuscaloosa, Mayor
- 8 March: Australia, Western Australia, Legislative Assembly and Legislative Council
- 9 March:
  - India, Haryana, Panipat, Municipal Corporation
  - Switzerland, Solothurn, Executive Council and Cantonal Council (1st round)
- 11 March: United States
  - Iowa, 100th House of Representatives district, special election
  - Minnesota, House of Representatives District 40B, special election
- 13 March: Uganda, Kawempe North, Parliament by-election
- 15 March: Australia, New South Wales, Port Macquarie, Legislative Assembly by-election
- 16 March: Poland, Constituency 33 (Kraków IV), Senate by-election
- 17 March: Canada, Quebec, Terrebonne, provincial by-election
- 18 March: Canada, Manitoba, Transcona, provincial by-election
- 20 March: United Kingdom, City of London Corporation, Court of Common Council
- 23 March:
  - Hungary, Budapest 11th constituency, National Parliament by-election
  - Portugal, Madeira, Legislative Assembly
  - Switzerland, Neuchâtel, Council of State and Grand Council (1st round)
- 25 March: United States
  - Mississippi
    - 23rd House of Representatives district, special election (1st round)
    - 82nd House of Representatives district, special election (1st round)
  - New York, New York City, 44th City Council district, special election
  - Pennsylvania
    - 35th House of Representatives district, special election
    - 36th Senate district, special election
  - South Carolina, 113th House of Representatives district, special election
- 26 March: Antigua and Barbuda, Barbuda Council
- 29 March: United States, Louisiana, ballot measures
- 30 March:
  - Armenia, Shirak Province, Gyumri, City Council
  - France, Jura's 2nd constituency, National Assembly by-election (1st round)

== April ==
- 1 April:
  - Greenland, local elections
  - United States, off-year elections
    - Florida
      - 1st congressional district, special election
      - 6th congressional district, special election
    - Illinois, local elections
      - Aurora, Mayor
    - Wisconsin, Supreme Court, Superintendent of Public Instruction, ballot measure
- 2 April: India, Assam, Rabha Hasong Autonomous Council
- 5 April: Canada, British Columbia, Vancouver, City Council by-elections
- 6 April: France, Jura's 2nd constituency, National Assembly by-election (2nd round)
- 8 April: United States
  - California, San Diego County, Board of Supervisors special election (1st round)
  - Missouri, St. Louis, Mayor and City Council
- 13 April:
  - Argentina, Santa Fe, Constitutional Assembly
  - Finland, local elections and county elections
  - Switzerland, Solothurn, Executive Council and Cantonal Council (2nd round)
- 13–14 April: Italy, Friuli Venezia Giulia, local elections
- 15 April: United States
  - California, Oakland, Mayor special election
  - Mississippi, 18th Senate district, special election
- 19 April: Indonesia, Bengkulu, South Bengkulu, Regent repeat election
- 22 April:
  - Liberia, Nimba County, Senate by-election
  - United States
    - Connecticut, 113th House of Representatives district, special election
    - Mississippi
      - 23rd House of Representatives district, special election (2nd round)
      - 82nd House of Representatives district, special election (2nd round)
- 24 April: Isle of Man, local authority elections
- 26 April: Malaysia, Perak, Ayer Kuning, State Legislative Assembly by-election
- 27 April: Austria, Vienna, Parliament
- 29 April: United States
  - Iowa, 78th House of Representatives district, special election
  - Minnesota, 6th Senate district, special election
  - New York, New York City, 51st City Council district, special election

== May ==
- 1 May: United Kingdom
  - Local elections
  - Runcorn and Helsby, House of Commons by-election
- 2–7 May: Assam, local elections
- 3 May: United States
  - Louisiana, 67th House of Representatives district, special election
  - Texas
    - Fort Worth, Mayor
    - Garland, Mayor (1st round)
    - San Antonio, Mayor (1st round) and City Council
- 4 May:
  - Italy, Trentino Alto Adige, local elections
  - Lebanon
    - Mount Lebanon Governorate, municipal elections
    - Keserwan-Jbeil Governorate, municipal elections
  - Mauritius, municipal elections
- 6 May:
  - Sri Lanka, Municipal Councils, Urban Councils and Divisional Councils
  - United States, Ohio, ballot measure
- 11 May:
  - Argentina
    - Chaco, Chamber of Deputies
    - Jujuy, Chamber of Deputies
    - Salta, Chamber of Deputies and Senate
    - San Luis, Chamber of Deputies and Senate
  - Lebanon
    - North Governorate, municipal elections
    - Akkar Governorate, municipal elections
  - Thailand, municipal elections
  - Uruguay, municipal elections
- 12 May: Philippines, local elections
- 13 May: United States
  - Massachusetts, House of Representatives 6th Essex district, special election
  - Nebraska, Omaha, Mayor and City Council
  - Oklahoma, 8th Senate district, special election
- 18 May:
  - Argentina, Buenos Aires City, Legislature
  - Croatia, local elections (1st round)
    - Zagreb, Mayor (1st round), City Assembly
  - France, Saône-et-Loire's 5th constituency, National Assembly by-election (1st round)
  - Lebanon
    - Beirut Governorate, municipal elections
    - Beqaa Governorate, municipal elections
    - Baalbek-Hermel Governorate, municipal elections
  - Sweden, Sámi Parliament election
  - Switzerland, Thurgau, Executive Council by-election and referendum
- 20 May: United States, New York, 22nd State Senate district, special election
- 21 May: Barbados, St. James North, House of Assembly by-election
- 24 May: Australia, Tasmania
  - Montgomery, Legislative Council periodic election
  - Nelson, Legislative Council periodic election
  - Pembroke, Legislative Council periodic election
- 25 May:
  - France, Saône-et-Loire's 5th constituency, National Assembly by-election (2nd round)
  - Lebanon
    - South Governorate, municipal elections
    - Nabatieh Governorate, municipal elections
- 25–26 May: Italy, local elections (1st round)

== June ==
- 1 June: Croatia, local elections (2nd round)
  - Zagreb, City Assembly
- 3 June: United States
  - Mississippi, local elections
    - Jackson, Mayor
  - Maryland, Prince George's County, Executive special election
  - South Carolina, 50th House of Representatives district, special election
- 4 June: Solomon Islands, West Guadalcanal, by-election
- 5 June: United Kingdom, Scotland, Hamilton, Larkhall and Stonehouse, Scottish Parliament by-election
- 7 June:
  - Latvia, municipal elections
    - Riga, City Council
  - United States, Texas
    - Garland, Mayor (2nd round)
    - San Antonio, Mayor (2nd round)
- 8 June: Argentina, Misiones, Chamber of Deputies
- 8–9 June: Italy, local elections (2nd round)
- 10 June: United States
  - Florida
    - 3rd House of Representatives district, special election
    - 32nd House of Representatives district, special election
    - 19th Senate district, special election
  - Massachusetts, House of Representatives 3rd Bristol district, special election
  - Oklahoma
    - 71st House of Representatives district, special election
    - 74th House of Representatives district, special election
    - 97th House of Representatives district, special election
- 15 June: Switzerland, Zug, Executive Council by-election (1st round)
- 18 June: United Kingdom, Guernsey, States of Guernsey
- 19 June: India
  - Gujarat
    - Kadi, by-election
    - Visavadar, by-election
  - Kerala, Nilambur, by-election
  - Punjab, Ludhiana West, by-election
  - West Bengal, Kaliganj, by-election
- 22 June: Japan, Tokyo, Tokyo Prefectural Assembly
- 23 June: Canada, Alberta
  - Edmonton-Ellerslie, provincial by-election
  - Edmonton-Strathcona, provincial by-election
  - Olds-Didsbury-Three Hills, provincial by-election
- 24 June: United States
  - Alabama, 5th Senate district, special election
  - California, 63rd State Assembly district, special election (1st round)
  - New Hampshire, House of Representatives Strafford 12 district, special election
- 29 June: Argentina, Formosa, Chamber of Deputies and Constitutional Assembly

== July ==
- 1 July: United States, California, San Diego County, Board of Supervisors special election
- 13 July: Taiwan, Nantou County Council's 4th constituency, Councillor recall election
- 15 July: United States, District of Columbia, Ward 8, special election
- 19 July: Australia, Tasmania, House of Assembly
- 24–28 July: India, Uttarakhand, local elections
- 26 July: Taiwan
  - Legislative Yuan recall elections
  - Hsinchu, Mayor recall election

== August ==
- 3 August: Japan, Yokohama, Mayor
- 5 August: United States
  - Arizona, San Tan Valley, incorporation election
  - Delaware, 20th House of Representatives district, special election
  - Rhode Island, 4th Senate district, special election
- 6 August: Indonesia, Papua, Governor
- 10 August: Switzerland, Zug, Executive Council by-election (2nd round)
- 11 August: Canada, Quebec, Arthabaska, National Assembly by-election
- 12 August:
  - Canada, Prince Edward Island
    - Charlottetown-Hillsborough Park, Legislative Assembly by-election
    - Brackley-Hunter River, Legislative Assembly by-election
  - Liberia, Nimba-5, House of Representatives by-election
- 18 August: Canada, Battle River—Crowfoot, House of Commons by-election
- 23 August:
  - Australia, Northern Territory, local elections
  - Taiwan, Legislative Yuan recall elections
- 26 August:
  - Canada
    - Manitoba, Spruce Woods, Legislative Assembly by-election
  - United States
    - Alabama
      - 11th House of Representatives district, special election
      - Local elections
        - Birmingham
          - Mayor
          - City Council
        - Hoover, Mayor
        - Madison
          - Mayor
          - City Council
        - Mobile, Mayor
    - California, 63rd State Assembly district, special election (2nd round)
    - Georgia, 21st Senate district, special election (1st round)
    - Iowa, 1st Senate district, special election
- 27 August: Indonesia, repeat local elections
  - Bangka Belitung Islands
    - Pangkalpinang, Mayor repeat election
    - Bangka, Regent repeat election
- 31 August: Argentina, Corrientes, Governor, Chamber of Deputies, and Senate

== September ==
- 2 September: United States, Florida
  - 40th House of Representatives district, special election
  - 15th Senate district, special election
- 5 September: Papua New Guinea, Bougainville, President and House of Representatives
- 6 September: New Zealand, Tāmaki Makaurau, House of Representatives by-election
- 7 September: Argentina, Buenos Aires, Chamber of Deputies and Senate
- 8 September: Norway, Sámi Parliament
- 9 September: United States, Virginia, 11th congressional district, special election
- 13 September: Australia, New South Wales, Kiama, Legislative Assembly by-election
- 14 September:
  - Germany, North Rhine-Westphalia, local elections
  - Russia, regional elections
- 16 September: United States, Minnesota, House of Representatives District 34B, special election
- 21 September: France, Paris's 2nd constituency, National Assembly by-election (1st round)
- 23 September: United States
  - Arizona, 7th congressional district, special election
  - Georgia, 21st Senate district, special election (2nd round)
- 28 September:
  - France
    - Paris's 2nd constituency, National Assembly by-election (2nd round)
    - Fifth French legislative constituency for citizens abroad, National Assembly by-election (1st round)
  - Italy, Aosta Valley, Regional Council
  - United States, Puerto Rico, 31st House of Representatives district, special election
- 28–29 September: Italy, Marche, Regional Council
- 30 September: United States, Missouri, Jackson County, executive recall election

== October ==
- 2 October: Canada, Newfoundland and Labrador, municipal elections (excluding St. John's)
- 4 October: Georgia, local elections
- 5 October: France, Tarn-et-Garonne's 1st constituency, National Assembly by-election (1st round)
- 5–6 October: Italy, Calabria, Regional Council
- 6 October: Canada, New Brunswick, Miramichi West, Legislative by-election
- 8 October: Canada, Newfoundland and Labrador, municipal elections in St. John's (postponed from 2 October)
- 11 October:
  - New Zealand, local elections
    - Auckland, Mayor
    - Wellington, Mayor
    - Christchurch, Mayor
    - Referendums on Māori wards and constituencies
  - United States, Louisiana, New Orleans, Mayor
- 12 October:
  - France
    - Fifth French legislative constituency for citizens abroad, National Assembly by-election (2nd round)
    - Tarn-et-Garonne's 1st constituency, National Assembly by-election (2nd round)
  - Kosovo, local elections (1st round)
  - Portugal, local elections
    - Lisbon, City Council
    - Porto, City Council
- 12–13 October: Italy, Tuscany, Regional Council
- 14 October: Canada, Newfoundland and Labrador, House of Assembly
- 18 October: Australia, Western Australia, local elections
- 19 October:
  - Estonia, municipal elections
    - Tallinn, City Council
  - North Macedonia, Mayors and Municipal Councils (1st round)
  - Switzerland, Jura, Parliament
- 20 October: Canada, Alberta, municipal elections
  - Calgary, Mayor and City Council
  - Edmonton, Mayor and City Council
- 23 October: United Kingdom, Wales, Senedd, Caerphilly by-election
- 25 October: Maldives, Addu, Referendum
- 26 October:
  - Argentina
    - Catamarca, Chamber of Deputies and Senate
    - Chubut, Referendum
    - La Rioja, Chamber of Deputies
    - Mendoza, Chamber of Deputies and Senate
    - Santiago del Estero, Governor and Chamber of Deputies
  - Japan, Miyagi, Governor
- 27 October: Canada, Nunavut, Legislative Assembly
- 28 October: United States, Alabama, 12th House of Representatives district, special election

== November ==
- 2 November:
  - Canada, Quebec, municipal elections
    - Gatineau, Mayor and City Council
    - Laval, Mayor and City Council
    - Longueuil, Mayor and City Council
    - Montreal, Mayor and City Council
    - Quebec City, Mayor and City Council
  - North Macedonia, Mayors and Municipal Councils (2nd round)
- 3 November: Canada, Yukon, Legislative Assembly
- 4 November: United States, off-year elections
  - California, ballot measure
  - Colorado, ballot measures
  - Florida, Miami, Mayor (1st round)
  - Georgia
    - Public Service Commission, district 2 and 3 special election
    - 106th House of Representatives district, special election (1st round)
    - Atlanta, Mayor and City Council
  - Maine, ballot measures
  - Maryland, Annapolis, Mayor
  - Massachusetts, Boston, Mayor and City Council
  - Michigan
    - Detroit, Mayor
    - Dearborn, Mayor
    - Dearborn Heights, Mayor
    - Lansing, Mayor
  - Minnesota
    - Minnesota Senate, two special elections
    - Minneapolis, Mayor, City Council, and other municipal offices
    - Saint Paul, Mayor
  - Mississippi
    - State Senate, 11 special elections (1st round)
    - House of Representatives, 6 special elections
  - New Hampshire, House of Representatives Coos district 5, special election
  - New Jersey
    - Governor, Lieutenant Governor, and General Assembly
    - 35th legislative district, Senate special election
    - Atlantic City, Mayor
    - Hoboken, Mayor (1st round)
    - Jersey City, Mayor (1st round)
  - New Mexico
    - Albuquerque, Mayor (1st round)
    - Santa Fe, Mayor
  - New York
    - Ballot measure
    - 115th State Assembly district, special election
    - Albany, Mayor
    - Buffalo, Mayor
    - New York City, Mayor, City Council, Comptroller, Public Advocate, and borough presidents
    - Syracuse, Mayor
  - North Carolina
    - Charlotte, Mayor and City Council
    - Durham, Mayor
    - Greensboro, Mayor
  - Ohio
    - Cincinnati, Mayor
    - Cleveland, Mayor and City Council
    - Toledo, Mayor
  - Pennsylvania
    - Judicial elections
    - Allentown, Mayor
    - Pittsburgh, Mayor and City Council
  - South Carolina, Columbia, Mayor
  - Texas
    - Ballot measures
    - 18th congressional district, special election (1st round)
    - 9th Senate district, special election (1st round)
  - Virginia, Governor, Lieutenant Governor, Attorney General, and House of Delegates
  - Washington
    - Ballot measure
    - King County, Executive, County Council
    - Seattle, Mayor, City Attorney, City Council
    - State Senate, 5 special elections
    - House of Representatives, 4 special elections
- 6 November: India, Bihar, Legislative Assembly (1st phase)
- 9 November:
  - Albania, partial local elections
  - Kosovo, local elections (2nd round)
- 11 November: India, Bihar, Legislative Assembly (2nd phase)
- 18 November:
  - Denmark, local elections
  - United States, Georgia, 35th Senate district, special election (1st round)
- 23 November: Bosnia and Herzegovina, Republika Srpska, presidential election
- 23–24 November: Italy
  - Apulia, Regional Council
  - Campania, Regional Council
  - Veneto, Regional Council
- 26 November:
  - Namibia, local and regional
- 29 November:
  - Australia, Queensland, Hinchinbrook, Legislative Assembly by-election
  - Malaysia, Sabah, State Legislative Assembly

== December ==
- 2 December:
  - United States
    - Georgia, 106th House of Representatives district, special election (2nd round)
    - Mississippi, State Senate, 2 special elections (2nd round)
    - New Jersey
      - Hoboken, Mayor (2nd round)
      - Jersey City, Mayor (2nd round)
    - Tennessee, 7th congressional district, special election
- 7 December: Romania, Bucharest, mayoral election
- 8 December: Canada, Prince Edward Island, Georgetown-Pownal, Legislative Assembly by-election
- 9 December:
  - India, Kerala, Local Municipal elections (phase 1)
  - India, Kerala, Thiruvananthapuram
  - United States
    - Florida
      - 90th House of Representatives district, special election
      - 11th Senate district, special election
      - Miami, Mayor (2nd round)
    - Georgia
      - 23rd House of Representatives district, special election (1st round)
      - 121st House of Representatives district, special election
    - Iowa, 7th House of Representatives district, special election
    - New Mexico, Albuquerque, Mayor (2nd round)
- 11 December: India, Kerala, Local Municipal elections (phase 2)
- 15 December: India, Arunachal Pradesh, Itanagar, Municipal Corporation
- 16 December: United States
  - Georgia, 35th Senate district, special election (2nd round)
  - Kentucky, 37th Senate district, special election
- 21 December: Spain, Extremadura, Assembly
- 23 December: United States, South Carolina
  - 12th Senate district, special election
  - 21st House of Representatives district, special election
  - 88th House of Representatives district, special election
- 30 December: United States, Iowa, 16th Senate district, special election
