= List of elections in 2025 =

This is a list of elections that were held in 2025. The National Democratic Institute also maintains a calendar of elections around the world.

- 2025 national electoral calendar
- 2025 local electoral calendar

== International ==
- United Nations
  - 2025 United Nations Security Council election, 3 June

== Africa ==
- Ascension
  - 2025 Ascension general election, 3 July
- Burundi
  - 2025 Burundian parliamentary election, 5 June
- Cameroon
  - 2025 Cameroonian presidential election, 12 October
- Central African Republic
  - 2025 Central African general election, 28 December
- Comoros
  - 2025 Comorian parliamentary election, 12 January
- Egypt
  - 2025 Egyptian Senate election, 4–5 August (first round) & 27–28 August (second round)
  - 2025 Egyptian parliamentary election, 10-11 November (first round) & 3-4 December (second round)
- Gabon
  - 2025 Gabonese presidential election, 12 April
  - 2025 Gabonese parliamentary election, 27 September (first round), 11 October (second round) and 18 October (partial rerun)
- Guinea
  - 2025 Guinean presidential election, 28 December
- Guinea-Bissau
  - 2025 Guinea-Bissau general election, 23 November
- Ivory Coast
  - 2025 Ivorian presidential election, 25 October
  - 2025 Ivorian parliamentary election, 27 December
- Malawi
  - 2025 Malawian general election, 16 September
- Mauritius
  - 2025 Mauritian municipal elections, 4 May
- Namibia
  - 2025 Namibian local and regional elections, 26 November
- Saint Helena
  - 2025 Saint Helena general election, 3 September
- Seychelles
  - 2025 Seychellois general election, 27 September (first round) and 9–11 October (second round)
- Somalia
  - 2025 Somali parliamentary election
  - 2025 Mogadishu district council election, 25 December
- Tanzania
  - 2025 Tanzanian general election, 29 October
- Togo
  - 2025 Togolese Senate election, 15 February
  - 2025 Togolese presidential election, 3 May
  - 2025 Togolese municipal elections, 17 July
- Tristan da Cunha
  - 2025 Tristan da Cunha general election, 5 March

== Americas ==
- Anguilla
  - 2025 Anguillian general election, 26 February
- Argentina
  - 2025 Argentine legislative election, 26 October
  - 2025 Argentine provincial elections
- Belize
  - 2025 Belizean general election, 12 March
- Bermuda
  - 2025 Bermudian general election, 18 February
- Bolivia
  - 2025 Bolivian general election, 17 August (first round) and 19 October (second round)
- Canada
  - 2025 Ontario general election, 27 February
  - 2025 Canadian federal election, 28 April
  - 2025 Newfoundland and Labrador general election, 14 October
  - 2025 Nunavut general election, 27 October
  - 2025 Yukon general election, 3 November
- Cayman Islands
  - 2025 Caymanian general election, 30 April
- Chile
  - 2025 Chilean general election, 16 November (first round) & 14 December (second round)
- Curaçao
  - 2025 Curaçao general election, 21 March
- Ecuador
  - 2025 Ecuadorian general election, 9 February (first round) & 13 April (second round)
- Greenland
  - 2025 Greenlandic general election, 11 March
  - 2025 Greenlandic local elections, 1 April
- Guyana
  - 2025 Guyanese general election, 1 September
- Honduras
  - 2025 Honduran general election, 30 November
- Jamaica
  - 2025 Jamaican general election, 3 September
- Mexico
  - 2025 Mexican judicial elections, 1 June
- Saint Lucia
  - 2025 Saint Lucian general election, 1 December
- Saint Vincent and the Grenadines
  - 2025 Vincentian general election, 27 November
- Suriname
  - 2025 Surinamese general election, 25 May
- Trinidad and Tobago
  - 2025 Trinidad and Tobago general election, 28 April
- Turks and Caicos Islands
  - 2025 Turks and Caicos Islands general election, 7 February
- United States
  - 2025 United States elections, 4 November
    - 2025 United States gubernatorial elections
    - 2025 United States state legislative elections
- Uruguay
  - 2025 Uruguayan municipal elections, 11 May
- Venezuela
  - 2025 Venezuelan parliamentary election, 25 May
  - 2025 Venezuelan regional elections, 25 May
  - 2025 Venezuelan municipal elections, 27 July

== Asia ==
- Hong Kong
  - 2025 Hong Kong legislative election, 7 December
- India
  - 2025 elections in India
    - 2025 Delhi Legislative Assembly election, 5 February
    - 2025 Indian presidential election, 9 September
    - 2025 Bihar Legislative Assembly election, 6 November & 11 November
- Indonesia
  - 2025 Indonesian local elections, 27 August
- Iraq
  - 2025 Iraqi parliamentary election, 11 November
- Japan
  - 2025 Tokyo prefectural election, 22 June
  - 2025 Japanese House of Councillors election, 20 July
- Kyrgyzstan
  - 2025 Kyrgyz parliamentary election, 30 November
- Lebanon
  - 2022–2025 Lebanese presidential election
  - 2025 Lebanese municipal elections, May
- Macau
  - 2025 Macanese legislative election, 14 September
- Malaysia
  - 2025 Sabah state election, 29 November
- Myanmar
  - 2025–26 Myanmar general election, 28 December (first phase)
- Pakistan
  - 2025 Pakistani by-elections, 23 November
- Philippines
  - 2025 Philippine general election, 12 May
    - 2025 Philippine House of Representatives elections
    - 2025 Philippine Senate election
  - 2025 Philippine local elections, 12 May
- Singapore
  - 2025 Singaporean general election, 3 May
- South Korea
  - 2025 South Korean presidential election, 3 June
  - 2025 South Korean by-elections
- Sri Lanka
  - 2025 Sri Lankan local elections, 6 May
- Syria
  - 2025 Syrian parliamentary election, 5 October
- Thailand
  - 2025 Thai Provincial Administrative Organization election, 1 February
  - 2025 Thai local elections, 11 May
- Taiwan
  - 2025 Taiwanese recall votes, 26 July & 23 August (Note: Limited or no international recognition.)
- Tajikistan
  - 2025 Tajik parliamentary election, 2 March

== Europe ==
- Abkhazia
  - 2025 Abkhazian presidential election, 15 February (first round) & 1 March (second round)
- Albania
  - 2025 Albanian parliamentary election, 11 May
  - 2025 Albanian local elections, 9 November
- Austria
  - 2025 Burgenland state election, 19 January
  - 2025 Viennese state election, 27 April
- Belarus
  - 2025 Belarusian presidential election, 26 January
- Bosnia and Herzegovina
  - 2025 Republika Srpska presidential election, 23 November
- Croatia
  - 2024–25 Croatian presidential election, 12 January (second round)
  - 2025 Croatian local elections, 18 May (first round) & 1 June (second round)
- Czech Republic
  - 2025 Czech parliamentary election, 3–4 October
- Denmark
  - 2025 Danish local elections, 18 November
- Estonia
  - 2025 Estonian municipal elections, 19 October
- Finland
  - 2025 Finnish county elections, 13 April
  - 2025 Finnish municipal elections, 13 April
- Georgia
  - 2025 Georgian local elections, 4 October
- Germany
  - 2025 German federal election, 23 February
  - 2025 Hamburg state election, 2 March
- Greece
  - 2025 Greek presidential election, 25 January (first round) & 31 January (second round) & 6 February (third round) & 12 February (fourth round)
- Ireland
  - 2025 Seanad election, 29–30 January
  - 2025 Irish presidential election, 24 October
- Isle of Man
  - 2025 Manx local elections, 24 April
- Italy
  - 2025 Italian local elections, 25–26 May (first round) & 8–9 June (second round)
  - 2025 Italian regional elections, 28 September–24 November
    - 2025 Valdostan regional election, 28 September
    - 2025 Marche regional election, 28–29 September
    - 2025 Calabrian regional election, 5–6 October
    - 2025 Tuscan regional election, 12–13 October
    - 2025 Apulian regional election, 23–24 November
    - 2025 Campania regional election, 23–24 November
    - 2025 Venetian regional election, 23–24 November
- Kosovo
  - 2025 Kosovan parliamentary election, 9 February
  - 2025 Kosovan local elections, 12 October (first round) and 9 November (second round)
  - 2025 Kosovan parliamentary election, 28 December
- Latvia
  - 2025 Latvian municipal elections, 7 June
- Liechtenstein
  - 2025 Liechtenstein general election, 9 February
- Moldova
  - 2025 Moldovan parliamentary election, 28 September
- Montenegro
  - 2025 Montenegrin municipal elections, Unknown
- Netherlands
  - 2025 Dutch general election, 29 October
- Northern Cyprus
  - 2025 Northern Cypriot presidential election, 19 October
- North Macedonia
  - 2025 North Macedonian local elections, 19 October (first round) & 2 November (second round)
- Norway
  - 2025 Norwegian parliamentary election, 8 September
  - 2025 Norwegian Sámi parliamentary election, 8 September
- Poland
  - 2025 Polish presidential election, 18 May (first round) & 1 June (second round)
- Portugal
  - 2025 Madeiran regional election, 23 March
  - 2025 Portuguese legislative election, 18 May
  - 2025 Portuguese local elections, 12 October
- Romania
  - 2025 Romanian presidential election, 4 May (first round) & 18 May (second round)
  - 2025 Bucharest mayoral election, 7 December
- Russia
  - 2025 Russian elections, 14 September
- Spain
  - 2025 Extremaduran regional election, 21 December
- United Kingdom
  - 2025 United Kingdom local elections, 1 May
- Vatican City
  - 2025 papal conclave, 7–8 May

== Oceania ==
- Australia
  - 2025 Western Australian state election, 8 March
  - 2025 Australian federal election, 3 May
  - 2025 Tasmanian state election, 19 July
- Micronesia
  - 2025 Micronesian general election, 4 March
- Nauru
  - 2025 Nauruan parliamentary election, 11 October
- New Zealand
  - 2025 New Zealand local elections, 11 October
- Papua New Guinea
  - 2025 Bougainvillean general election, 5 September
- Samoa
  - 2025 Samoan general election, 29 August
- Tonga
  - 2025 Tongan general election, 20 November
- Vanuatu
  - 2025 Vanuatuan general election, 16 January

== See also ==
- List of elections in 2024
- List of elections in 2026
