= 2025 national electoral calendar =

- Countries with national elections or referendums: Executive Legislative Executive and Legislative Referendum Executive and Referendum Legislative and Referendum Executive, Legislative and Referendum Judicial

This national electoral calendar for 2025 lists the national/federal elections held in 2025 in all sovereign states and their dependent territories. By-elections are excluded, though national referendums are included.

== January ==
- 12 January:
  - Comoros, Parliament
  - Croatia, President (2nd round)
- 16 January: Vanuatu, Parliament
- 26 January: Belarus, President

== February ==
- 7 February: Turks and Caicos Islands, Parliament
- 9 February:
  - Ecuador, President (1st round) and Parliament
  - Kosovo, Parliament
  - Liechtenstein, Parliament
  - Switzerland, Referendums
- 15 February: Abkhazia, President (1st round)
- 18 February: Bermuda, House of Assembly
- 23 February: Germany, Bundestag
- 26 February: Anguilla, Parliament

== March ==
- 1 March: Abkhazia, President (2nd round)
- 2 March: Tajikistan, Assembly of Representatives
- 5 March: Tristan da Cunha, Chief Islander and Parliament
- 11 March: Greenland, Parliament
- 12 March: Belize, House of Representatives
- 21 March: Curaçao, Parliament

== April ==
- 12 April: Gabon, President
- 13 April: Ecuador, President (2nd round)
- 25 April: Marshall Islands, Constitutional Referendum
- 28 April:
  - Canada, House of Commons
  - Trinidad and Tobago, House of Representatives
- 30 April: Cayman Islands, Parliament and Referendum

== May ==
- 3 May:
  - Australia, House of Representatives and Senate
  - Singapore, Parliament
- 4 May: Romania, President (1st round)
- 11 May: Albania, Parliament
- 12 May: Philippines, House of Representatives and Senate
- 18 May:
  - Poland, President (1st round)
  - Portugal, Parliament
  - Romania, President (2nd round)
- 25 May:
  - Suriname, Parliament
  - Venezuela, Parliament

== June ==
- 1 June:
  - Mexico, Judicial
  - Poland, President (2nd round)
- 3 June: South Korea, President
- 5 June: Burundi, National Assembly
- 8–9 June: Italy, Referendum
- 18 June: Guernsey, States of Guernsey

== July ==
- 3 July: Ascension, Island Council
- 20 July: Japan, House of Councillors

== August ==
- 4–5 August: Egypt: Senate (1st round)
- 17 August: Bolivia, President (1st round), Chamber of Deputies and Senate
- 23 August: Taiwan, Referendum
- 27–28 August: Egypt: Senate (2nd round)
- 29 August: Samoa, Parliament

== September ==
- 1 September: Guyana, President and Parliament
- 3 September:
  - Jamaica, House of Representatives
  - Saint Helena, Legislative Council
- 8 September: Norway, Parliament
- 14 September: Macau, Parliament
- 16 September: Malawi, President and Parliament
- 21 September: Guinea, Constitutional Referendum
- 25–27 September: Seychelles, President (1st round) and Parliament
- 27 September: Gabon, National Assembly (1st round)
- 28 September:
  - Moldova, Parliament
  - Switzerland, Referendums

== October ==
- 3–4 October: Czech Republic, Chamber of Deputies
- 9–11 October: Seychelles, President (2nd round)
- 11 October:
  - Gabon, National Assembly (2nd round)
  - Nauru, Parliament and Referendum
- 12 October: Cameroon, President
- 19 October:
  - Bolivia, President (2nd round)
  - Northern Cyprus, President
- 24 October: Ireland, President
- 25 October: Ivory Coast, President
- 26 October: Argentina, Chamber of Deputies and Senate
- 29 October:
  - Netherlands, Parliament
  - Tanzania, President and Parliament

== November ==
- 5 November: Pitcairn Islands, Mayor and Island Council
- 10–11 November: Egypt, House of Representatives (1st round)
- 11 November: Iraq, Parliament
- 16 November:
  - Chile, President (1st round), Chamber of Deputies and Senate
  - Ecuador, Referendums
- 20 November: Tonga, Parliament
- 23 November:
  - Guinea-Bissau, President and Parliament
  - Slovenia, Referendum
- 24–25 November: Egypt, House of Representatives (2nd round)
- 27 November: Saint Vincent and the Grenadines, Parliament
- 30 November:
  - Honduras, President and Parliament
  - Kyrgyzstan, Parliament
  - Switzerland, Referendums
  - Transnistria, Parliament

== December ==
- 1 December: Saint Lucia, House of Assembly
- 7 December: Hong Kong, Legislative Council
- 11 December: Falkland Islands, Legislative Assembly
- 14 December: Chile, President (2nd round)
- 27 December: Ivory Coast, Parliament
- 28 December:
  - Central African Republic, President and National Assembly (first round)
  - Guinea, President
  - Kosovo, Parliament
  - Myanmar, Parliament (1st phase)

== Indirect elections ==
The following indirect elections of heads of state and the upper houses of bicameral legislatures took place through votes in elected lower houses, unicameral legislatures, or electoral colleges:

- 29 September 2022–9 January: Lebanon, President
- 25 January–12 February: Greece, President
- 29–30 January: Ireland, Seanad
- 15 February: Togo, Senate
- 25 February: Chad, Senate
- 4 March: Isle of Man, Legislative Council
- 9 March: Algeria, Council of the Nation
- 12 March: Switzerland, Federal Council
- 28 March: Tajikistan, National Assembly
- 3 May: Togo, President
- 7–8 May: Vatican City, Pope
- 19 June and 24 October: India, Council of States
- 6 July: Suriname, President
- 23 July: Burundi, Senate
- 23 July: India, President
- 9 September: India, Vice President
- 5 October: Syria, Parliament
- 7 October: Barbados, President
- 14 October: Nauru, President

== See also ==
- List of elections in 2025
