= 2025 Texas Proposition 8 =

- November 4, 2025
- Prohibit Taxes on a Decedent's Property or Estate Transfer Amendment

Results
Choice	Votes	%
Yes	2,147,644	72.25%
No	824,871	27.75%
Total votes	2,972,515	100.00%
County results
Yes
50–60%
60–70%
70–80%
80–90%
>90%
No
50–60%

Texas Proposition 8, officially the Prohibit Taxes on a Decedent's Property or Estate Transfer Amendment, is a legislatively referred constitutional amendment that appeared on the ballot in the U.S. state of Texas on November 4, 2025. The measure proposed amending the state constitution to prohibit the state legislature from imposing a tax on a deceased person's property or the transfer of an estate, inheritance, legacy, succession, or gift. It was widely approved by voters, passing in 253 of the state's 254 counties.

== Background ==
Until September 2015, Texas had an inheritance tax. It was repealed by the state legislature in Senate Bill 752. Texas is one of the 38 U.S. states that has no estate tax.

The measure was supported by the Libertarian Party of Texas and opposed by the Green Party of Texas, while the Republican Party of Texas remained neutral.

== Impact ==
Proposition 8 added a new section to Article 8 of the Texas Constitution, prohibiting the state legislature from:

- imposing a state tax on an estate or inheritance tax after an individual's death
- imposing a state tax on the transfer of an estate or inheritance from one individual or family to another
- increasing the rate of a transfer tax or expanding who the tax applies to

The measure also amended the state constitution to exempt gifts of motor vehicles or property taxes from the ban.

== Endorsements ==
Yes

Statewide officials

- Greg Abbott, governor of Texas (2015–present) (Republican)

State legislators

- Cesar Blanco, state senator from the 29th district (2021–present) (Democratic)

Organizations

- Texans for Fiscal Responsibility
- Texas Association of Builders
- Texas Association of Realtors
- Texas Farm Bureau

Political parties

- Libertarian Party of Texas

Newspapers

- The Dallas Morning News
No

Organizations

- Every Texan
- University Democrats

Political parties

- Green Party of Texas

Newspapers

- Austin American-Statesman
- The Austin Chronicle
- Houston Chronicle
- San Antonio Express-News
- Fort Worth Star-Telegram
Neutral

Political parties

- Republican Party of Texas

== Results ==
2025 Texas Question 8
Choice	Votes	%
For	2,147,644	72.25
Against	824,871	27.75
Total	2,972,515	100.00
Source: Texas Secretary of State
