= 2025 New York state elections =

- November 4, 2025

Elections in New York took place throughout 2025. The general election was held on November 4, 2025. A state primary election was held on June 24, 2025.

== Federal elections ==
No special elections to the United States Congress took place in 2025. A special election in New York's 21st congressional district was expected to take place sometime in 2025 due to Elise Stefanik's expected resignation to take an ambassadorship, but her nomination was withdrawn by President Trump, allowing her to keep her congressional seat.

== State elections ==
=== Senate District 22 special election ===
A special election for New York's 22nd State Senate district took place on May 20, 2025. Senate District 8 represents a portion of Kings County, which is coextensive with the borough of Brooklyn in New York City. The vacancy was caused by the resignation of Democratic senator Simcha Felder in April 2025. Democratic nominee Sam Sutton defeated Republican and Conservative nominee Nachman Caller by 35 points in a district handily won by Donald Trump in the 2024 general election, due in part to the prevalence of Orthodox Jewish bloc voting.

2025 New York Senate District 22 special election
Party	Candidate	Votes	%
Democratic	Sam Sutton	8,970	67.03%
Republican	Nachman Caller	3,736	27.92%
Conservative	Nachman Caller	536	4.01%
Total	Nachman Caller	4,272	31.92%
Write-in		140	1.05%
Total votes		13,382	100.00%
Turnout			~8%
Registered electors		155,468	

== County elections ==
=== Westchester County ===
==== February 2025 Executive special election ====
2025 Westchester County Executive special election
Party	Candidate	Votes	Percentage
Democratic	Kenneth W. Jenkins	60,020	63.70%
Republican	Christine Sculti	34,175	36.30%
Totals		92,288	100.00%
Democratic hold			

==== November 2025 Executive election ====
2025 Westchester County Executive general election November 4, 2025
Party	Candidate	Votes	%
Democratic	Ken Jenkins (incumbent)	125,011	67.64%
Republican	Christine Sculti	59,606	32.36%
Turnout		183,295	26.39%
Registered electors		694,659	

== Ballot Measures ==
- Use of Mount Van Hoevenberg Sports Complex Land and Acquisition of 2,500 Acres for Adirondack Park Amendment: a constitutional amendment that would authorize the Mount Van Hoevenberg Olympic Sports Complex in Essex County to occupy over 300 acres of Adirondack Forest Preserve land that is currently protected as "forever wild" under the state constitution.
