= 2025 Colorado Proposition MM =

- November 4, 2025
- Tax Deductions and Revenue for School Meals Measure

Results
Choice	Votes	%
Yes	1,010,644	59.73%
No	681,400	40.27%
Total votes	1,692,044	100.00%
Yes
70–80%
60–70%
50–60%
No
80–90%
70–80%
60–70%
50–60%

Colorado Proposition MM, officially the Tax Deductions and Revenue for School Meals Measure, is a legislatively referred state statute that appeared on the ballot in the U.S. state of Colorado on November 4, 2025. The measure passed by a wide margin.

== Background ==
In 2022, voters passed Proposition FF, which provided free breakfast and lunch to all students regardless of family income. To fund it, state income tax deductions were limited for those earning over $300,000 per year. Over $100 million was raised through the reduced deductions. Proposition MM was placed on the ballot with the intention to fully fund the program by further limiting income tax deductions. It was proposed alongside Proposition LL.

== Text ==
Shall state taxes be increased by $95 million annually by a change to the Colorado Revised Statutes to support access to healthy food for Colorado kids and families, including the Healthy School Meals for All program, and, in connection therewith, increasing state taxable income only for individuals who have a federal taxable income of $300,000 or more by limiting itemized or standard state income tax deductions to $1,000 for single tax return filers and $2,000 for joint tax return filers for the purposes of fully funding the Healthy School Meals for All program to continue paying for public schools to offer free breakfast and lunch to all public school students while also increasing wages for employees who prepare and serve school meals, helping schools use basic, nutritious ingredients, instead of processed products, and ensuring that Colorado grown and raised products are part of school meals; supporting the Supplemental Nutrition Assistance Program (SNAP) that helps low-income Colorado families afford groceries; and allowing the state to retain and spend as a voter-approved revenue change all additional tax revenue generated by these tax deduction changes?

== Impact ==
Proposition MM passed and it's anticipated that it will raise close to $95 million through increased taxes, with any excess funding going to SNAP benefits.

== Endorsements ==
Yes

Statewide officials

- Jared Polis, Governor of Colorado (2019–present) (Democratic)

State legislators

- 19 state senators, including:
  - Dafna Michaelson Jenet, state senator from the 21st district (2023–present) (Democratic)
  - Judy Amabile, state senator from the 18th district (2023–present) (Democratic)
- 31 state representatives, including:
  - Lorena Garcia, state representative from the 35th district (2023–present) (Democratic)
  - Katie Stewart, state representative from the 59th district (2025–present) (Democratic)
  - Rick Taggart, state representative from the 55th district (2023–present) (Republican)
No

State legislators

- Lori Sander, state representative from the 65th district (2025–present) (Republican)
