= 2025 Texas Proposition 16 =

- November 4, 2025
- Citizenship Voting Requirement Amendment

Results
| Choice | Votes | % |
|---|---|---|
| Yes | 2,140,409 | 72.01% |
| No | 832,137 | 27.99% |
| Total votes | 2,972,546 | 100.00% |
County results
Yes
>90%
80–90%
70–80%
60–70%
50–60%
No
50–60%

Texas Proposition 16, officially the Citizenship Voting Requirement Amendment, is a legislatively referred constitutional amendment that appeared on the ballot in the U.S. state of Texas on November 4, 2025. It was approved in all but one of the state's 254 counties.

== Background ==
In 2023, the state senate approved Senate Joint Resolution 35 – a resolution proposing the same constitutional amendments as the Proposition 16 – by a vote of 29-1. The resolution was then rejected by the state house in an 88-0 vote, with 54 members voting present and 7 absent.

In 2025, the amendment was reintroduced without changes as Senate Joint Resolution 37. The state senate passed it by a vote of 28-3, with unanimous Republican support. The three 'No' votes came from Democrats, though another 8 Democrats joined Republicans in supporting the resolution.

Prior to the proposition's passing, state law required voters to attest their citizenship when they first register to vote, and voting as a non-citizen was a second-degree felony.

== Impact ==
Proposition 16 amended Article 6 of the Texas Constitution to include non-citizens on the list of people prohibited from voting in the state's elections. The list previously included minors, convicted felons, and people determined by a court to be mentally incompetent.

In order to repeal the proposition, approval would be needed from two-thirds of the state legislature as well registered voters in a constitutional amendment.

== Endorsements ==
Yes

State officials

- Greg Abbott, governor of Texas (2015–present) (Republican)

State legislators

- Cesar Blanco, state senator from the 29th district (2021–present) (Democratic)

Organizations

- Texans for Fiscal Responsibility
- Texas Farm Bureau

Political parties

- Republican Party of Texas

Newspapers

- The Dallas Morning News
- Houston Chronicle
- Fort Worth Star-Telegram
No

Organizations

- Every Texan

Political parties

- Libertarian Party of Texas
- Green Party of Texas

Newspapers

- Austin American-Statesman
- The Austin Chronicle
- San Antonio Express-News
Neutral

Labor unions

- Texas Association of Realtors

== Results ==
2025 Texas Question 16
| Choice | Votes | % |
|---|---|---|
| For | 2,140,409 | 72.01 |
| Against | 832,137 | 27.99 |
| Total | 2,972,546 | 100.00 |
Source: Texas Secretary of State
