= Elections in New York =

Elections in New York may refer to:

- Elections in New York (state)
- Elections in New York City
