= 2025 Texas Proposition 15 =

Referendum declaring parental rights

- November 4, 2025
- "The constitutional amendment affirming that parents are the primary decision makers for their children."

Results
Choice	Votes	%
Yes	2,072,942	69.90%
No	892,457	30.10%
County results
Yes
>90%
80–90%
70–80%
60–70%
50–60%
No
50–60%

2025 Texas Proposition 15 was a proposed amendment to the Constitution of Texas to declare that parents have the responsibility to nurture and protect their children, and that they have a fundamental right to "exercise care, custody, and control" of their children, including decisions relating to the child's upbringing. Placed on the ballot by Senate Joint Resolution 34, the measure passed, receiving just under 70% of the vote, and the backing of all but one of Texas's 254 counties.

== Background ==
In November 2025, 26 U.S. states had adopted statewide policies enacting a Parents' Bill of Rights.

=== Legislation for Proposition 15 ===
Senate Joint Resolution 34 (S.J.R. 34) placed the amendment on the ballot. The resolution was introduced on February 7, 2025, by State Sen. Bryan Hughes. On March 11, 2025, the State Senate unanimously passed the measure 31–0, and on May 14, 2025, the State House passed an amended version in a 112–22 vote, with 16 legislators either absent or not voting. The State Senate concurred with the amended version unanimously on May 20, 2025.

The amended version removed a provision that would have restricted the state or a political subdivision from interfering with parental rights unless the interference was necessary to implement a compelling governmental interest and was narrowly tailored in order to reach that goal.

== Endorsements ==
Yes

State legislators

- Cesar Blanco, state senator from the 29th district (2021–present) (Democratic)
- James Frank, state representative from the 69th district (2013–present) (Republican)
- Brian Hughes, state senator from the 1st district (2017–present) (Republican)

Political parties

- Libertarian Party of Texas

Organizations

- Baptist General Convention of Texas Christian Life Commission
- Texans for Fiscal Responsibility
- Texans for Vaccine Choice
- Texas Eagle Forum
- Texas Public Policy Foundation

Newspapers

- The Dallas Morning News
- Fort Worth Star-Telegram
No

State legislators

- Ana-Maria Ramos, state representative from the 102nd district (2019–present) (Democratic)
- Molly Cook, state senator from the 15th district (2024–present) (Democratic)

Political parties

- Green Party of Texas

Newspapers

- Austin American-Statesman
- The Austin Chronicle
- San Antonio Express-News
- Houston Chronicle
Neutral

Labor unions

- Texas Association of Realtors
- Texas Farm Bureau

== Contents and amendment ==
=== Ballot wording ===
The amendment, which was decided by voters alongside the 2025 Texas constitutional amendment election on November 4, 2025, had the following information shown to voters for it:

STATE OF TEXAS PROPOSITION 15

"The constitutional amendment affirming that parents are the primary decision makers for their children."

(PROPUESTA NÚMERO 15 DEL ESTADO DE TEXAS)

("La enmienda constitucional que afirma que los padres son los principales responsables de la toma de decisiones para sus hijos.")

() For (A Favor)

() Against (En Contra)

=== Constitutional changes ===
The amendment added Section 37 and the following language to Article 1 of the Constitution of Texas:

Sec. 37. To enshrine truths that are deeply rooted in this nation's history and traditions, the people of Texas hereby affirm that a parent has the responsibility to nurture and protect the parent's child and the corresponding fundamental right to exercise care, custody, and control of the parent's child, including the right to make decisions concerning the child's upbringing.

== Results ==
2025 Texas Proposition 15
Choice	Votes	%
For	2,072,942	69.90
Against	892,457	30.10
Total	2,965,399	100.00
Source: Associated Press

Travis County, which contains Austin, the capital city of Texas, was the only county of the state to oppose the measure, with 58.4% voting against.
