= Texas Medical Association =

Physicians association

- Formation: 1853
- Type: Professional Association
- Headquarters: Austin, Texas
- Members: 60,000+
- President: Bradford Holland, MD
- Revenue: $28,604,082 (2023)
- Website: texmed.org

The Texas Medical Association (TMA) is a professional nonprofit organization representing over 60,000 physicians, residents, medical student and alliance members. It is located in Austin, has 110 component county medical societies around the state, and is the largest state medical society in the United States.

== History ==
The Texas Medical Association was established by 35 physicians in 1853 to provide medical and public health education for Texas physicians and their patients as well as legislative and regulatory advocacy and health policy research. The first president of TMA was Joseph Taylor and the current president is Bradford Holland, MD.

- 1853 – TMA founded in Austin with 35 members.
- 1893 – Women physicians join TMA as members.
- 1905 – Publication of the first issue of the Texas State Medical Journal (later Texas Medicine) in July.
- 1918 – Woman's Auxiliary to TMA established. This organization was renamed the Texas Medical Association Alliance (TMAA) in 1992. TMAA is a volunteer organization made up of physicians and physicians' spouses involved in health-related community service, legislation and political action.
- 1922 – TMA library established.
- 1951 – The Texas State Legislature grants a 50-year extension of the association's charter and their name officially changes from State Medical Association of Texas to Texas Medical Association on May 1.
- 1957 – TMA Anson Jones, MD, Awards created to recognize excellence in health care/medical news reporting in Texas.
- 1960 – TMA elects its first female president, May Owen, MD.
- 1962 – TEXPAC, the political arm of TMA, established. TEXPAC is a bi-partisan political action committee providing financial support to candidates for both state and federal offices.
- 1966 – TMA creates the Texas Medical Association Foundation, a 501(c)3 organization that funds the public health and science initiatives of TMA physicians.
- 1972 – Osteopathic physicians join TMA.
- 1973 – TMA incorporates medical students as members.
- 1991 – TMA establishes TMA's Hassle Factor Log that allows physicians to document payment hassles from insurance companies.
- 1994 – Hard Hats for Little Heads launched to reduce bicycle-related head injuries.
- 2000 – Border Health Caucus created to raise awareness of health care disparities existing along the U.S–Mexico border and their impact on border patients and their physicians.
- 2003 – TMA helps pass Texas' 2003 Tort Reform Act, which placed a cap of $250,000 for noneconomic damages on medical liability litigation, and supports Proposition 12, a constitutional amendment ensuring the cap could not be challenged in court. This cap can reach $750,000 if the liability for up to two hospitals involved in the care of the same patient is included.
- 2004 – Be Wise—Immunize program created to increase Texas' childhood immunization rate.
- 2013 – Joined the Choosing Wisely campaign.
- 2019 - TMA reaches over 53,000 members across the state.
- 2021 - TMA reaches over 55,000 members across the state.
- 2024 - TMA reaches over 57,000 members across the state.
- 2025 - TMA reaches over 59,000 members across the state.
- 2026 - TMA reaches over 60,000 members across the state.

== Political positions ==
The association opposes legislation expanding scope of practice for non-physicians. In March 2021, the group supported the Association of American Physicians and Surgeons and Physicians for Patient Protection in their opposition to Texas House Bill 2029, which was written to address the medical workforce shortage and improve public access to healthcare.

The group has expressed support for Proposition 14 in Texas, which would amend the constitution to establish a dementia prevention research institute using $3 billion USD from the state's general fund.

== History of Medicine Gallery ==
In 1991, TMA opened the History of Medicine Gallery on the ground floor of the TMA building. Items from the TMA archives and Collections are displayed in changing exhibits.

== Publications ==
The Texas Medical Association owns and publishes Texas Medicine, a monthly news magazine for TMA members that presents information on public health, medicolegal issues, medical economics, science, medical education, and legislative affairs affecting Texas physicians and their patients. TMA also publishes Texas Medicine Today, a daily e-newsletter that reports the latest information in the medical community.
