= 2025 Louisiana Amendment 4 =

- March 29, 2025
- Use Earliest Election Dates for Filling Judicial Vacancies Amendment

Results
Choice	Votes	%
Yes	229,597	36.38%
No	401,499	63.62%
Total votes	631,096	100.00%
Registered voters/turnout	2,980,408	21.17%
- Parish results No: 50–60% 60–70% 70–80% 80–90% 90–100% Yes: 50–60% 60–70%
- Unofficial results as of March 30, 2025

Louisiana Amendment 4 was a legislatively referred constitutional amendment that appeared on the ballot on March 29, 2025. If passed, the amendment would have required special elections to the Louisiana Supreme Court to occur at the earliest available date. The referendum failed.

== Background ==
Currently, judges to the Supreme Court are elected in partisan elections that are scheduled within 12 months after the day the vacancy occurs. The amendment would require the election to be scheduled at the soonest possible date.
