= 2025 Louisiana Amendment 3 =

- March 29, 2025
- Legislative Authority to Determine Crimes for Trying Juveniles as Adults Amendment

Results
Choice	Votes	%
Yes	212,343	33.61%
No	419,392	66.39%
Total votes	631,735	100.00%
Registered voters/turnout	2,980,408	21.2%
- Parish results No: 50–60% 60–70% 70–80% 80–90% 90–100% Yes: 50–60% 60–70%

Louisiana Amendment 3 was a legislatively referred constitutional amendment that appeared on the ballot on March 29, 2025. If passed, the amendment would have allowed the state legislature to determine in state law which specific felony crimes can result in a juvenile being tried as an adult. The referendum failed, with over two-thirds of voters rejecting the proposed amendment.

== Background ==
As outlined in the state constitution, the state legislature, could, by a two-thirds (66.67%) vote, choose to have a juvenile tried as an adult for crimes such as murder, rape and kidnapping. Under the proposed amendment, the section would have been removed from the constitution, and, instead, the legislature would have been authorized to determine in state law which crimes could result in a juvenile being tried as an adult.

The amendment was passed in the state legislature along partisan lines with support from all Republicans and a lone Democrat.

== Endorsements ==
Yes

Statewide officials

- Jeff Landry, governor of Louisiana (2024–present) (Republican)

State legislators

- Heather Cloud, state senator from the 28th district (2020–present) (Republican)
- Jay Morris, state senator from the 35th district (2020–present) (Republican)
- Debbie Villio, state representative from the 79th district (2020–present) (Republican)
No

Organizations

- ACLU of Louisiana
- Southern Poverty Law Center
- Vera Institute of Justice

Newspapers

- The Times-Picayune/The New Orleans Advocate

== Results ==
2024 Louisiana Amendment 3
Choice	Votes	%
For	212,343	33.61
Against	419,392	66.39
Total	631,735	100.00
Source: Ballotpedia
