= 2025 Ohio Issue 2 =

- May 6, 2025
- Local Public Infrastructure Bond Amendment

Results
Choice	Votes	%
Yes	588,251	67.76%
No	279,873	32.24%
Valid votes	868,124	100.00%
Invalid or blank votes	0	0.00%
Total votes	868,124	100.00%
- County results Yes: 50–60% 60–70% 70–80% No: 50–60%

Ohio Issue 2 was a legislatively referred constitutional amendment that appeared on the ballot in the U.S. State of Ohio on May 6, 2025.

== Background ==
Funding for the State Capital Improvement Program has been approved by voters three times, first in 1987. The amendment was passed as a bipartisan effort by the Ohio General Assembly.

== Impact ==
The 2025 measure would approve $250 million per year for ten years for the program. The money would go to projects relating to infrastructure, such as bridges, road, sewers, and water lines.

== Endorsements ==
Yes

State legislators

- Nickie J. Antonio, state senator from the 23rd district (Democratic)
- Brian Chavez, state senator from the 30th district (Republican)

Organizations

- Ohio Environmental Council

Political parties

- Ohio Democratic Party

Labor unions

- Ohio AFL-CIO

Newspapers

- The Blade
- The Plain Dealer
No

State Representatives

- Ron Ferguson, state representative from the 96th district (2021–present) (Republican)

== Results by county ==
Breakdown of voting by county
County	Yes, %	Yes, votes	No, %	No, votes
Adams	64.7%	547	35.3%	299
Allen	67.2%	5,323	32.8%	2,599
Ashland	61.7%	3,035	38.3%	1,885
Ashtabula	65.0%	5,402	35.0%	2,908
Athens	71.6%	2,684	28.4%	1,066
Auglaize	65.8%	2,244	34.2%	1,165
Belmont	67.8%	2,092	32.2%	992
Brown	59.0%	919	41.0%	638
Butler	64.9%	12,044	35.1%	6,512
Carroll	60.9%	960	39.1%	617
Champaign	59.6%	3,318	40.4%	2,248
Clark	59.9%	7,826	40.1%	5,251
Clermont	46.8%	9,043	53.2%	10,264
Clinton	62.4%	2,007	37.6%	1,208
Columbiana	57.6%	6,275	42.4%	4,615
Coshocton	49.7%	1,850	50.3%	1,874
Crawford	60.8%	2,226	39.2%	1,435
Cuyahoga	77.8%	74,323	22.2%	21,253
Darke	63.2%	1,743	36.8%	1,014
Defiance	73.1%	1,165	26.9%	428
Delaware	71.0%	15,569	29.0%	6,361
Erie	66.4%	3,088	33.6%	1,563
Fairfield	62.1%	6,364	37.9%	3,878
Fayette	61.3%	727	38.7%	459
Franklin	77.2%	57,641	22.8%	16,996
Fulton	64.2%	1,405	35.8%	783
Gallia	51.7%	403	48.3%	377
Geauga	57.7%	4,466	42.3%	3,275
Greene	59.1%	11,389	40.9%	7,874
Guernsey	57.8%	834	42.2%	610
Hamilton	75.0%	40,448	25.0%	13,495
Hancock	71.6%	6,794	28.4%	2,697
Hardin	61.1%	1,276	38.9%	811
Harrison	72.8%	514	27.2%	192
Henry	73.4%	994	26.6%	361
Highland	54.8%	1,227	45.2%	1,013
Hocking	58.7%	911	41.3%	642
Holmes	58.4%	654	41.6%	466
Huron	59.7%	2,390	40.3%	1,611
Jackson	63.5%	838	36.5%	482
Jefferson	74.4%	3,237	25.6%	1,117
Knox	59.4%	2,501	40.6%	1,711
Lake	71.1%	11,519	28.9%	4,686
Lawrence	56.5%	896	43.5%	690
Licking	57.7%	9,766	42.3%	7,159
Logan	63.0%	1,986	37.0%	1,167
Lorain	65.3%	21,192	34.7%	11,262
Lucas	64.2%	17,525	35.8%	9,776
Madison	57.4%	2,146	42.6%	1,596
Mahoning	66.1%	9,990	33.9%	5,121
Marion	64.6%	1,879	35.4%	1,031
Medina	63.2%	11,445	36.8%	6,671
Meigs	56.0%	736	44.0%	579
Mercer	66.0%	2,252	34.0%	1,160
Miami	65.1%	6,673	34.9%	3,581
Monroe	53.7%	438	46.3%	378
Montgomery	70.1%	26,082	29.9%	11,104
Morgan	64.9%	596	35.1%	323
Morrow	53.8%	1,350	46.2%	1,161
Muskingum	60.3%	2,313	39.7%	1,522
Noble	65.1%	501	34.9%	269
Ottawa	65.5%	3,009	34.5%	1,586
Paulding	68.8%	586	31.2%	266
Perry	56.1%	936	43.9%	732
Pickaway	50.0%	3,673	50.0%	3,677
Pike	66.5%	466	33.5%	235
Portage	69.3%	9,936	30.7%	4,393
Preble	56.9%	1,408	43.1%	1,065
Putnam	72.8%	1,447	27.2%	540
Richland	64.0%	4,472	36.0%	2,521
Ross	66.0%	1,945	34.0%	1,004
Sandusky	63.4%	2,563	36.6%	1,477
Scioto	69.1%	1,809	30.9%	809
Seneca	67.2%	2,043	32.8%	999
Shelby	58.4%	2,009	41.6%	1,429
Stark	64.0%	18,894	36.0%	10,614
Summit	72.1%	37,941	27.9%	14,710
Trumbull	70.5%	10,655	29.5%	4,462
Tuscarawas	60.0%	4,582	40.0%	3,060
Union	65.9%	8,060	34.1%	4,174
Van Wert	66.6%	1,017	33.4%	510
Vinton	58.0%	333	42.0%	241
Warren	60.8%	8,384	39.2%	5,401
Washington	62.0%	4,174	38.0%	2,558
Wayne	62.4%	5,517	37.6%	3,324
Williams	57.9%	1,353	42.1%	983
Wood	74.0%	11,938	26.0%	4,187
Wyandot	63.8%	1,120	36.2%	635
