= 2025 Argentine provincial elections =

Provincial elections were held in 15 of the country's 24 provinces in 2025. The elections renewed half of the provincial legislatures and elected governors in Corrientes and Santiago del Estero. According to incomplete official results, the opposition Homeland Force gained 13 more points compared to Javier Milei's La Libertad Avanza. The number of seats to be renewed varied by province. Some have bicameral legislatures, requiring the election of provincial deputies and senators, and others have unicameral legislatures. Chubut, Córdoba, Entre Ríos, La Pampa, Neuquén, Río Negro, San Juan, Santa Cruz, Santa Fe, Tierra del Fuego, and Tucumán did not elect any provincial institutions, although Chubut did hold a referendum.

== Provinces going for election ==
Provinces marked in bold have an page for their respective elections.

Province	Date	Elected governor	Party	Alliance	Deputies	Senators	Constitutional convention	Referendum
**Autonomous City of Buenos Aires**	7 September 2025				30			
(Buenos Aires Province) **Buenos Aires (province)**	18 May 2025				46	23		
(Catamarca Province) Catamarca	26 October 2025				21	8		
(Chaco Province) Chaco	11 May 2025				16			
(Chubut Province) Chubut	26 October 2025							Yes
(Corrientes Province) Corrientes	31 August 2025	Juan Pablo Valdés	UCR	United Provinces	15	5		
(Formosa Province) Formosa	29 June 2025				15		30	
(Jujuy Province) Jujuy	11 May 2025				24			
(La Rioja Province, Argentina) La Rioja	26 October 2025				18			
(Mendoza Province) Mendoza	26 October 2025				24	19		
(Misiones Province) Misiones	8 June 2025				20			
(Salta Province) Salta	11 May 2025				30	12		
(San Luis Province) San Luis	11 May 2025				23	4		
(Santa Fe Province) Santa Fe	13 April 2025						Yes	
(Santiago del Estero Province) **Santiago del Estero**	26 October 2025	Elías Suárez	UCR	Civic Front for Santiago	40			

== Results ==
Juan Pablo Valdés of the Civic Radical Union (UCR) was elected governor of Corrientes with 51,9% of the votes by the ruling coalition Vamos Corrientes. La Libertad Avanza consolidated politically, winning Buenos Aires City and Chaco (in alliance with the UCR), and finishing second in several provinces. The provincial parties demonstrated their relevance by winning in Santa Fe, Salta, Jujuy, San Luis, Misiones, and Corrientes. The Homeland Force had poor results in most provinces but won Formosa and Buenos Aires Province by a wide margin.

=== By province ===
- 2025 Buenos Aires City elections
- 2025 Buenos Aires provincial elections
- 2025 Santiago del Estero provincial elections

== See also ==
- 2025 Argentine legislative election
- Elections in Argentina
