= 2025 Colorado Proposition LL =

- November 4, 2025
- Allow State to Retain Revenue From Proposition FF Measure

Results
Choice	Votes	%
Yes	1,107,376	66.15%
No	566,563	33.85%
Total votes	1,673,939	100.00%
Yes
80–90%
70–80%
60–70%
50–60%
No
70–80%
60–70%
50–60%

Colorado Proposition LL, officially the Allow State to Retain Revenue From Proposition FF Measure, is a legislatively referred state statute that appeared on the ballot in the U.S. state of Colorado on November 4, 2025.

== Background ==
In 2022, voters passed Proposition FF, which provided free breakfast and lunch to all students regardless of family income. To fund it, state income tax deductions were limited for those earning over $300,000 per year. Over $100 million was raised through the reduced deductions. As state law requires tax increases to be approved by voters, Proposition LL was placed on the ballot.

== Text ==
Without raising taxes, may the state keep and spend all revenue generated by the 2022 voter-approved state tax deduction limits on individuals with incomes of $300,000 or more and maintain these deduction limits in order to continue funding the healthy school meals for all program, which pays for public schools to offer free breakfast and lunch to all students in kindergarten through twelfth grade.

== Impact ==
If passed, it would allow the state to spend over $12 million raised through those deductions.

== Endorsements ==
Yes

Statewide officials

- Jared Polis, Governor of Colorado (2019–present) (Democratic)

State legislators

- 19 state senators, including:
  - Dafna Michaelson Jenet, state senator from the 21st district (2023–present) (Democratic)
  - Judy Amabile, state senator from the 18th district (2023–present) (Democratic)
- 31 state representatives, including:
  - Lorena Garcia, state representative from the 35th district (2023–present) (Democratic)
  - Katie Stewart, state representative from the 59th district (2025–present) (Democratic)
  - Rick Taggart, state representative from the 55th district (2023–present) (Republican)
No

State legislators

- Lori Sander, state representative from the 65th district (2025–present) (Republican)

== See also ==
- 2022 Colorado Proposition FF
