= 2025 Santiago del Estero provincial elections =

Provincial election in Argentina

- Gubernatorial election
- 26 October 2025
- Registered: 826 887
- Turnout: 72.97% (▼3.9pp)
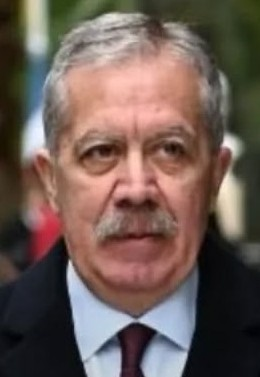

Nominee	Elías Suárez	Alejandro Parnás	Ítalo Cioccolani
Party	UCR	UCR	LLA
Alliance	Civic Front for Santiago	Despierta Santiago	-
Running mate	Carlos Silva; Neder	Emilio Rached	Marie Gau
Popular vote	437,556	65,018	61,584
Percentage	73.85%	10.97%	10.39%
Governor before election
Gerardo Zamora
UCR
Elected Governor
Elías Suárez
UCR
- Legislature
- 26 October 2025
- All 40 seats in the Chamber of Deputies of Santiago del Estero
- Turnout: 72.84%
Party	Leader	Vote %	Seats	+/–
FCS	Juan Beltramino	41.84	18	+2
FP	Gerardo Montenegro	31.91	14	+2
Despierta Santiago	Facundo Carletti	10,73	4	−1
LLA	Norma Luján	10.45	4	New
This lists parties that won seats. See the complete results below.

Provincial elections were held on 26 October 2025 in the Argentine province of Santiago del Estero to elect the Governor and the Chamber of Deputies. Incumbent Governor Gerardo Zamora, who had been serving since 2017, having previously served between 2005 and 2013, did not stand for re-election. Elías Suárez, Zamora's chief of staff, won a landslide victory, being elected with over 73% of the vote.

== Electoral System ==
The 40 seats of the Chamber of Deputies of Santiago del Estero are elected through party-list proportional representation in a single province-wide constituency using the D'hondt method for a term of 4 years.

== Results ==
=== Governor and Vice-governor ===
Candidate	Running mate	Party	Votes	%
Elías Suárez	Carlos Neder	Civic Front for Santiago	437,556	73.83
Alejandro Parnás	Emilio Rached	Radical Civic Union	65,018	10.97
Ítalo Cioccolani	Marie Gau	La Libertad Avanza	61,584	10.39
Verónica Larcher	Oscar Nieva	Renewal Front	9,577	1.62
Roger Nediani	Silvina González	Unite for the future	7,401	1.25
5 other candidates	-	-	11,527	1.94
Total			592,663	100.00
Valid votes			592,663	98.20
Invalid votes			3,700	0.61
Blank votes			7,146	1.18
Total votes			603,509	100.00
Registered voters/turnout			826,887	72.99
Source: El Liberal

=== Legislature ===
Party	Votes	%	+/–	Seats	+/–
Civic Front for Santiago	247,035	41.84	▲5.59	18	▲2
Homeland Force	188,435	31.91	▲4.68	14	▲2
Despierta Santiago	63,386	10.73	▼1.54	4	▼1
La Libertad Avanza	61,724	10.45	NEW	4	NEW
Renewal Front	9,855	1.67	▼9.37	0	▼4
Unite for the future	7,264	1.23	Steady	0	Steady
Other parties	12,771	2.16	▼11.03	0	▼3
Total	590,470	100.00	–	40	0
Valid votes	590,470	98.04			
Invalid votes	3,819	0.63			
Blank votes	8,015	1.33			
Total votes	602,304	100.00			
Registered voters/turnout	826,887	72.84			
Source: El Liberal
