= 2025 Birmingham, Alabama City Council election =

Local election in Alabama, U.S.

- August 26, 2025; October 7, 2025

The 2025 Birmingham, Alabama City Council election was held on August 26, 2025, to elect all nine members of the Birmingham, Alabama City Council. Runoff elections were held on October 7, 2025.

== District 1 ==
=== Candidates ===
==== Declared ====
- Priscilla Edwards
- Willie C. Goldsmith
- Tara Nix
- Clinton Woods, incumbent councilor

=== Results ===
2025 Birmingham City Council election, district 1
Candidate	Votes	%
Clinton Woods (incumbent)	2,765	68.31
Tara Nix	699	17.27
Willie C. Goldsmith	425	3.93
Priscilla Edwards	159	1.50
Total votes	4,048	100.00

== District 2 ==
=== Candidates ===
==== Declared ====
- Hunter Williams, incumbent councilor

=== Results ===
2025 Birmingham City Council election, district 2
Candidate	Votes	%
Hunter Williams (incumbent)	Unopposed	100.00

== District 3 ==
=== Candidates ===
==== Declared ====
- Ryan Jones, perennial candidate
- Josh Vasa, nonprofit employee

==== Declined ====
- Valerie Abbott, incumbent councilor

=== Results ===
2025 Birmingham City Council election, district 3
Candidate	Votes	%
Josh Vasa	2,292	80.20
Ryan Jones	566	19.80
Total votes	2,858	100.00

== District 4 ==
=== Candidates ===
==== Declared ====
- Brian Gunn, member of the city planning commission
- Joseph Jordan Holt
- J. T. Moore, incumbent councilor
- Darryl Williams, candidate for mayor in 2021

=== Results ===
2025 Birmingham City Council election, district 4
Candidate	Votes	%
Brian Gunn	1,429	41.03
J. T. Moore (incumbent)	1,109	31.84
Joseph Jordan Holt	754	21.65
Darryl Williams	191	5.48
Total votes	3,483	100.00

=== Runoff ===
==== Results ====
2025 Birmingham City Council runoff election, district 4
Candidate	Votes	%
Brian Gunn	676	67.67
J. T. Moore (incumbent)	323	32.33
Total votes	999	100.00

== District 5 ==
=== Candidates ===
==== Declared ====
- Darrell O'Quinn, incumbent councilor

=== Results ===
2025 Birmingham City Council election, district 5
Candidate	Votes	%
Darrell O'Quinn (incumbent)	Unopposed	100.00

== District 6 ==
=== Candidates ===
==== Declared ====
- Crystal Smitherman, incumbent councilor
- Keith Williams

=== Results ===
2025 Birmingham City Council election, district 6
Candidate	Votes	%
Crystal Smitherman (incumbent)	2,605	82.25
Keith Williams	562	17.75
Total votes	3,167	100.00

== District 7 ==
=== Candidates ===
==== Declared ====
- Wardine Alexander, incumbent councilor
- Lonnie Franklin Malone

=== Results ===
2025 Birmingham City Council election, district 7
Candidate	Votes	%
Wardine Alexander (incumbent)	2,263	57.54
Lonnie Franklin Malone	1,670	42.46
Total votes	3,933	100.00

== District 8 ==
=== Candidates ===
==== Declared ====
- Eric Delk
- Jonathan Hatten
- Susan Palmer
- Joe May
- David Rivers
- Justin Smith, activist
- Sonja Q. Smith
- Adlai M. Trone
- April Myers Williams, former Birmingham City Schools board member

==== Declined ====
- Carol Clarke, incumbent councilor

=== Results ===
2025 Birmingham City Council election, district 8
Candidate	Votes	%
April Myers Williams	1,408	32.18
Sonja Q. Smith	1,389	31.75
Jonathan Hatten	334	7.63
Adlai M. Trone	332	7.59
David Rivers	309	7.06
Joe May	218	4.98
Justin Smith	165	3.77
Susan Palmer	153	3.50
Eric Delk	67	1.53
Total votes	4,382	100.00

=== Runoff ===
==== Results ====
2025 Birmingham City Council runoff election, district 8
Candidate	Votes	%
Sonja Q. Smith	867	55.61
April Myers Williams	692	44.39
Total votes	1,559	100.00

== District 9 ==
=== Candidates ===
==== Declared ====
- Beatrice Collins
- Richard Franklin Jr.
- John Hilliard, former councilor (2017–2021)
- LaTonya Tate, incumbent councilor

=== Results ===
2025 Birmingham City Council election, district 9
Candidate	Votes	%
LaTonya Tate (incumbent)	2,063	44.54
John Hilliard	1,344	29.02
Richard E. Franklin Jr.	799	17.25
Beatrice Collins	426	9.20
Total votes	4,632	100.00

=== Runoff ===
==== Results ====
2025 Birmingham City Council runoff election, district 9
Candidate	Votes	%
LaTonya Tate (incumbent)	921	55.65
John Hilliard	734	44.35
Total votes	1,655	100.00
