= 2025 Texas Proposition 14 =

- November 4, 2025
- Establish Dementia Prevention and Research Institute of Texas Amendment

Results
Choice	Votes	%
Yes	2,017,935	68.59%
No	924,022	31.41%
Total votes	2,941,957	100.00%
County results
Yes
50–60%
60–70%
70–80%
80–90%
No
50–60%

Texas Proposition 14, officially the Establish Dementia Prevention and Research Institute of Texas Amendment, is a legislatively referred constitutional amendment that appeared on the ballot in the U.S. state of Texas on November 4, 2025. It was approved voters with over two thirds in favor.

A lawsuit was filed after the election claiming that the voting machines used in the election were not certified. The funding mechanism for the Research Institute has been halted pending the results of the case.

== Background ==
The proposition was approved for the ballot by the Texas Legislature as a bipartisan effort. It passed in the House on April 28, 2025 with unanimous support from voting Democrats and 85.4% support from voting Republicans. On May 12, 2025, it passed in the Senate with unanimous bipartisan support.

The proposition is similar to one passed by voters in 2007 to establish the Cancer Prevention and Research Institute of Texas. The Alzheimer's Association supported the legislation.

== Impact ==
The amendment allocates $3 billion from the budget to the Dementia Prevention and Research Institute of Texas, which was established in early 2025.

== Endorsements ==
Yes

Statewide officials

- Dan Patrick, lieutenant governor of Texas (2015–present) (Republican)

State legislators

- Joan Huffman, state senator from the 17th district (2008–present) (Republican)
- Tom Craddick, state representative from the 82nd district (1993–present) (Note: Craddick first assumed office in 1969 representing the 70th district. He has also represented the 68th and 76th districts, serving for a combined 29 terms.) (Republican)
- Senfronia Thompson, state representative from the 141st district (1983–present) (Note: Thompson previously represented the 89th district from 1973 to 1983.) (Democratic)

Party chapters

- Collin County Democratic Party
- Montgomery County Democratic Party
- Tarrant County Democratic Party
- Travis County Democratic Party
- Dallas County Democratic Party
- Harris County Democratic Party

Organizations

- Alzheimer's Association
- AARP Texas
- Texas Medical Association
- Baylor Scott & White Health
- Houston Methodist Hospital
- Texas Children's Hospital
- Texas Medical Center
- The Michael J. Fox Foundation

Newspapers

- Austin American-Statesman
- Houston Chronicle
- San Antonio Express-News
- The Austin Chronicle
No

Local officials

- Brian Harrison, state representative from the 10th district (2021–present) (Republican)

Party chapters

- Brazoria County Democratic Party

Political parties

- Libertarian Party of Texas
Neutral

Party chapters

- Bell County Democratic Party
- Bexar County Democratic Party

Organizations

- Texas Association of Realtors

== Results ==
2025 Texas Question 14
Choice	Votes	%
For	2,017,935	68.59
Against	924,022	31.41
Total	2,941,957	100.00
Source: Texas Secretary of State
