= 2025 Texas constitutional amendment election =

- November 4, 2025

The 2025 Texas constitutional amendment election took place on November 4, 2025. Texas voters statewide voted on 17 proposed amendments to the Texas Constitution.

Proposed amendments are legislatively referred on to the ballot, requiring approval as a joint resolution by at least two-thirds of both the Texas House of Representatives and Texas State Senate. At 17 proposed amendments, this is the most amendments on a ballot in Texas since 2003. All 17 were approved by the voters, a majority of them passing with over 60% of the votes in favor.

== Proposition 1 ==
(SJR 59) "The constitutional amendment providing for the creation of the permanent technical institution infrastructure fund and the available workforce education fund to support the capital needs of educational programs offered by the Texas State Technical College System."

Yes The measure passed.

Texas Proposition 1
Choice	Votes	%
For	2,054,008	69.18
Against	915,238	30.82
Total	2,969,246	100.00

=== Endorsements ===
Yes

Newspapers and publications

- Austin American-Statesman
- Houston Chronicle

== Proposition 2 ==
(SJR 18) "The constitutional amendment prohibiting the imposition of a tax on the realized or unrealized capital gains of an individual, family, estate, or trust."

Yes The measure passed.

Texas Proposition 2
Choice	Votes	%
For	1,952,360	65.66
Against	1,021,001	34.34
Total	2,973,361	100.00

=== Endorsements ===
No

Newspapers and publications

- Austin American-Statesman
- Houston Chronicle

== Proposition 3 ==
(SJR 5) "The constitutional amendment requiring the denial of bail under certain circumstances to persons accused of certain offenses punishable as a felony."

Yes The measure passed.

Texas Proposition 3
Choice	Votes	%
For	1,822,342	61.39
Against	1,145,919	38.61
Total	2,968,261	100.00

=== Endorsements ===
Yes

Newspapers and publications

- Houston Chronicle
No

Newspapers and publications

- Austin American-Statesman

== Proposition 4 ==
(HJR 7) "The constitutional amendment to dedicate a portion of the revenue derived from state sales and use taxes to the Texas water fund and to provide for the allocation and use of that revenue."

Yes The measure passed.

Texas Proposition 4
Choice	Votes	%
For	2,088,099	70.57
Against	870,688	29.43
Total	2,958,787	100.00

=== Endorsements ===
Yes

Newspapers and publications

- Austin American-Statesman
- Houston Chronicle

== Proposition 5 ==
(HJR 99) "The constitutional amendment authorizing the legislature to exempt from ad valorem taxation tangible personal property consisting of animal feed held by the owner of the property for sale at retail."

Yes The measure passed.

Texas Proposition 5
Choice	Votes	%
For	1,860,575	63.87
Against	1,052,678	36.13
Total	2,913,253	100.00

=== Endorsements ===
Yes

Newspapers and publications

- Austin American-Statesman
No

Newspapers and publications

- Houston Chronicle

== Proposition 6 ==
(HJR 4) "The constitutional amendment prohibiting the legislature from enacting a law imposing an occupation tax on certain entities that enter into transactions conveying securities or imposing a tax on certain securities transactions."

Yes The measure passed.

Texas Proposition 6
Choice	Votes	%
For	1,594,875	54.95
Against	1,307,789	45.05
Total	2,902,664	100.00

=== Endorsements ===
No

Newspapers and publications

- Austin American-Statesman
- Houston Chronicle

== Proposition 7 ==
(HJR 133) "The constitutional amendment authorizing the legislature to provide for an exemption from ad valorem taxation of all or part of the market value of the residence homestead of the surviving spouse of a veteran who died as a result of a condition or disease that is presumed under federal law to have been service-connected."

Yes The measure passed.

Texas Proposition 7
Choice	Votes	%
For	2,562,264	86.65
Against	394,767	13.35
Total	2,957,031	100.00

=== Endorsements ===
Yes

Newspapers and publications

- Austin American-Statesman
- Houston Chronicle

== Proposition 8 ==
(HJR 2) "The constitutional amendment to prohibit the legislature from imposing death taxes applicable to a decedent's property or the transfer of an estate, inheritance, legacy, succession, or gift."

Yes The measure passed.

Texas Proposition 8
Choice	Votes	%
For	2,147,644	72.25
Against	824,871	27.75
Total	2,972,515	100.00

== Proposition 9 ==
(HJR 1) "The constitutional amendment to authorize the legislature to exempt from ad valorem taxation a portion of the market value of tangible personal property a person owns that is held or used for the production of income."

Yes The measure passed.

Texas Proposition 9
Choice	Votes	%
For	1,909,242	65.30
Against	1,014,660	34.70
Total	2,923,902	100.00

=== Endorsements ===
No

Newspapers and publications

- Austin American-Statesman
- Houston Chronicle

== Proposition 10 ==
(SJR 84) "The constitutional amendment to authorize the legislature to provide for a temporary exemption from ad valorem taxation of the appraised value of an improvement to a residence homestead that is completely destroyed by a fire."

Yes The measure passed.

Texas Proposition 10
Choice	Votes	%
For	2,640,028	89.29
Against	316,585	10.71
Total	2,956,613	100.00

=== Endorsements ===
Yes

Newspapers and publications

- Austin American-Statesman
- Houston Chronicle

== Proposition 11 ==
(SJR 85) "The constitutional amendment authorizing the legislature to increase the amount of the exemption from ad valorem taxation by a school district of the market value of the residence homestead of a person who is elderly or disabled."

Yes The measure passed.

Texas Proposition 11
Choice	Votes	%
For	2,301,919	77.71
Against	660,143	22.29
Total	2,962,062	100.00

=== Endorsements ===
Yes

Newspapers and publications

- Austin American-Statesman
- Houston Chronicle

== Proposition 12 ==
(SJR 27) "The constitutional amendment regarding the membership of the State Commission on Judicial Conduct, the membership of the tribunal to review the commission's recommendations, and the authority of the commission, the tribunal, and the Texas Supreme Court to more effectively sanction judges and justices for judicial misconduct."

Yes The measure passed.

Texas Proposition 12
Choice	Votes	%
For	1,803,779	61.97
Against	1,106,817	38.03
Total	2,910,596	100.00

=== Endorsements ===
No

Newspapers and publications

- Austin American-Statesman
- Houston Chronicle

== Proposition 13 ==
(SJR 2) "The constitutional amendment to increase the amount of the exemption of residence homesteads from ad valorem taxation by a school district from $100,000 to $140,000."

Yes The measure passed.

Texas Proposition 13
Choice	Votes	%
For	2,357,587	79.47
Against	609,126	20.53
Total	2,966,713	100.00

=== Endorsements ===
Yes

Newspapers and publications

- Austin American-Statesman
- Houston Chronicle

== Proposition 14 ==
"The constitutional amendment providing for the establishment of the Dementia Prevention and Research Institute of Texas, establishing the Dementia Prevention and Research Fund to provide money for research on and prevention and treatment of dementia, Alzheimer's disease, Parkinson's disease, and related disorders in this state, and transferring to that fund $3 billion from state general revenue."

Yes The measure passed.

Texas Proposition 14
Choice	Votes	%
For	2,017,935	68.59
Against	924,022	31.41
Total	2,941,957	100.00

A lawsuit was filed after the election alleging that the voting machines used had not been certified. The funding mechanism for the Research Fund was halted pending the outcome of the case.

== Proposition 15 ==
(SJR 34) "The constitutional amendment affirming that parents are the primary decision makers for their children."

Yes The measure passed.

Texas Proposition 15
Choice	Votes	%
For	2,072,942	69.90
Against	892,457	30.10
Total	2,965,399	100.00

== Proposition 16 ==
(SJR 37) "The constitutional amendment clarifying that a voter must be a United States citizen."

The amendment, filed by Republican state senator Brian Birdwell, would affirm that only U.S. citizens are permitted to vote; a ban on noncitizen voting is already codified in state and federal law.

Yes The measure passed.

Texas Proposition 16
Choice	Votes	%
For	2,140,409	72.01
Against	832,137	27.99
Total	2,972,546	100.00

== Proposition 17 ==
(HJR 34) "The constitutional amendment to authorize the legislature to provide for an exemption from ad valorem taxation of the amount of the market value of real property located in a county that borders the United Mexican States that arises from the installation or construction on the property of border security infrastructure and related improvements."

Yes The measure passed.

Texas Proposition 17
Choice	Votes	%
For	1,673,961	57.67
Against	1,228,823	42.33
Total	2,902,784	100.00

=== Endorsements ===
No

Newspapers and publications

- Austin American-Statesman
- Houston Chronicle

== See also ==
- 2025 Texas elections
