= Elections in New York City =

Political elections for public offices in New York City

New York City (5 boroughs) presidential election results
Year	Democratic		Republican	
2024	68.10%	1,903,344	30.01%	838,838
2020	76.19%	2,321,759	22.70%	691,682
2016	79.95%	2,191,869	17.04%	467,254
2012	81.19%	1,995,241	17.78%	436,889
2008	79.29%	2,074,159	20.06%	524,787
2004	74.99%	1,828,015	24.10%	587,534
2000	77.90%	1,703,364	18.23%	398,726
1996	77.10%	1,512,248	17.31%	339,537
1992	68.72%	1,458,784	24.00%	509,423
1988	66.17%	1,340,795	32.84%	665,407
1984	60.96%	1,343,875	38.66%	852,317
1980	54.88%	1,052,178	37.51%	719,278
1976	66.37%	1,423,380	32.95%	706,663
1972	51.46%	1,342,996	48.27%	1,259,873
1968	60.56%	1,582,681	33.94%	886,959
1964	73.02%	2,183,646	26.81%	801,877
1960	62.62%	1,936,323	37.04%	1,145,205
1956	51.10%	1,617,701	48.90%	1,548,132
1952	54.54%	1,861,930	43.79%	1,495,493
1948	49.47%	1,596,545	34.34%	1,108,288
1944	61.64%	2,042,500	38.36%	1,271,287
1940	61.18%	1,966,083	38.82%	1,247,624
1936	75.40%	2,041,347	24.60%	665,951
1932	67.31%	1,455,176	27.02%	584,056
1928	62.06%	1,167,971	37.94%	714,144
1924	35.02%	489,199	44.83%	626,131
1920	27.34%	345,001	62.29%	785,947
1916	52.95%	353,235	47.05%	313,813
1912	49.76%	312,386	20.16%	126,582
1908	48.52%	284,190	51.48%	301,568
1904	53.05%	326,900	46.95%	289,345
1900	52.47%	309,524	47.53%	280,343

Since the creation of the City of Greater New York in 1898, New York City has been a stronghold of the Democratic Party. The city as a whole has only been carried by a Republican in three presidential elections that being William Howard Taft in 1908, Warren G. Harding in 1920, and President Calvin Coolidge in 1924. The boroughs of Manhattan and the Bronx were only carried by a Republican in 1920 and 1924. Brooklyn was carried by a Republican just six times (1896 through 1908, 1920, and 1924), while Queens has been carried by a Republican on the presidential level once since 1960 (in 1972). Meanwhile, Staten Island remains strongly Republican having been carried by a Democrat four times since 1940 (in 1964, 1996, 2000, and 2012).

As of 2024, New York City is split between 14 of the state's 26 congressional districts, covering the 3rd through 16th congressional districts. All but one are held by Democrats, the only exception is the Staten Island-based 11th district. Due almost entirely to the Democrats' near-total dominance at the local level, the Democrats have held a majority of the state's congressional seats since 1965.

Historically, the most conservative district in the city is that based in Staten Island and southern Brooklyn; until 2013 called New York's 13th congressional district. The district has been a reliably red bastion in a deep blue city, sending a Republican to Congress in every election since 1980 except 2008 and 2018. With former city councilman Michael McMahon's 2008 election victory in the district, Democrats took all of the city's congressional seats for the first time in 76 years. The status would be short-lived as Republican Michael Grimm defeated McMahon 2 years later to retake the seat in the 2010 midterms. Renamed in 2013 as New York's 11th congressional district, the seat would flip once more when Democrat Max Rose unseated Republican incumbent Dan Donovan in the 2018 midterm election. However, Democratic gain in the district proved ephemeral yet again. In the 2020 election, Republican Assemblywoman Nicole Malliotakis has reclaimed the GOP's sole House seat in New York City, again defeating a freshman Democratic incumbent, by a margin of 53% to 47%.

Following the 2020 census, New York's 3rd district, which is primarily located in Nassau County, was redrawn to include portions of northeast Queens. In the subsequent 2022 election, George Santos defeated Robert Zimmerman to become the district's representative, joining Malliotakis as the only other Republican to represent any of the five boroughs in Congress. However, Santos was expelled and replaced by Democrat Tom Suozzi in February 2024.

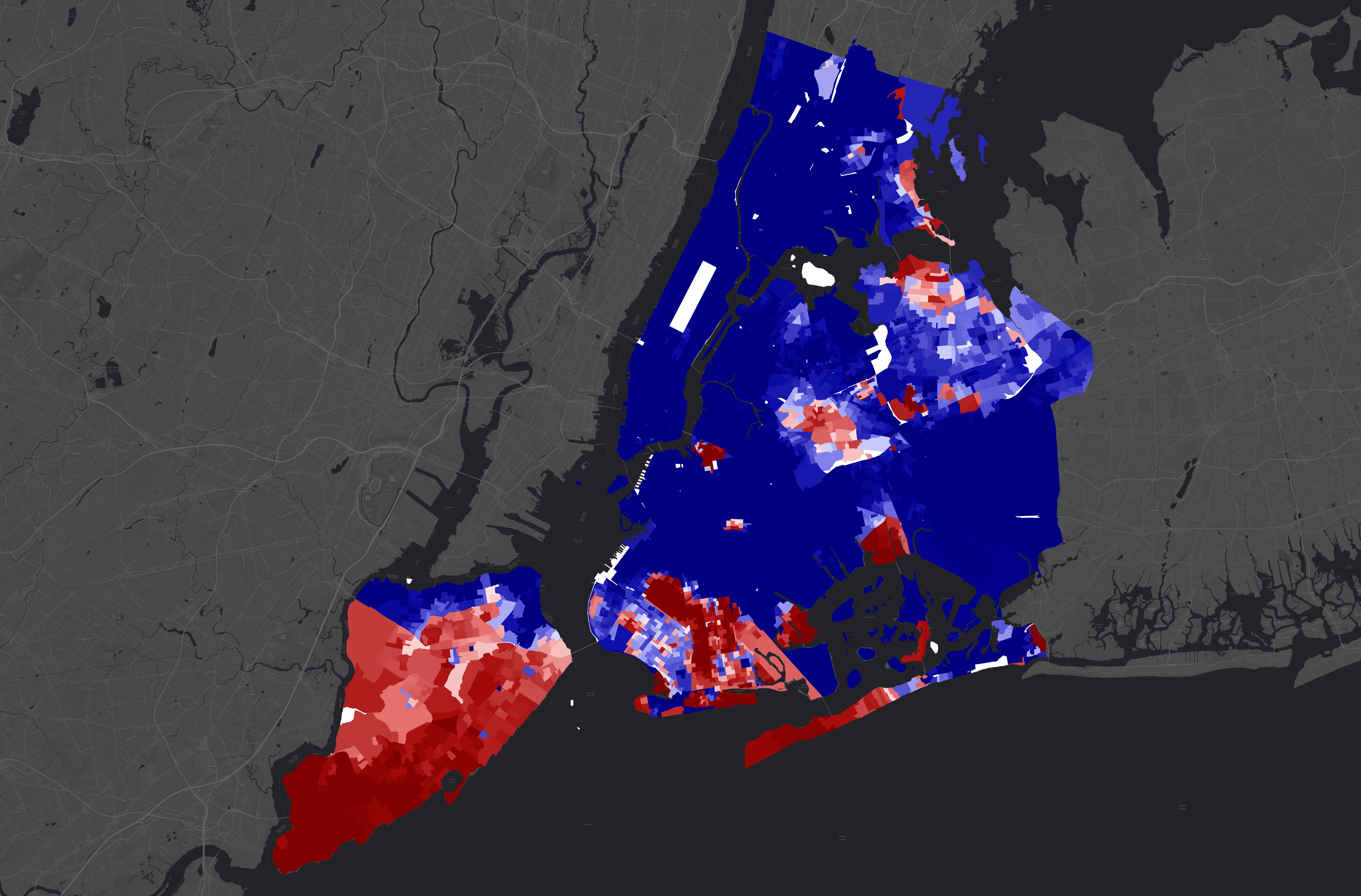
In the image above, the 2020 presidential results are displayed in New York City for each electoral precinct. The blue represents precincts won by Democrat Joe Biden, while precincts won by Republican Donald Trump are colored in red.

== Political influence ==
The Flushing Remonstrance signed by colonists in 1657 is considered a precursor to the United States Constitution's provision on freedom of religion in the Bill of Rights. The signers protested the Dutch colonial authorities' persecution of Quakers in what is today the borough of Queens.

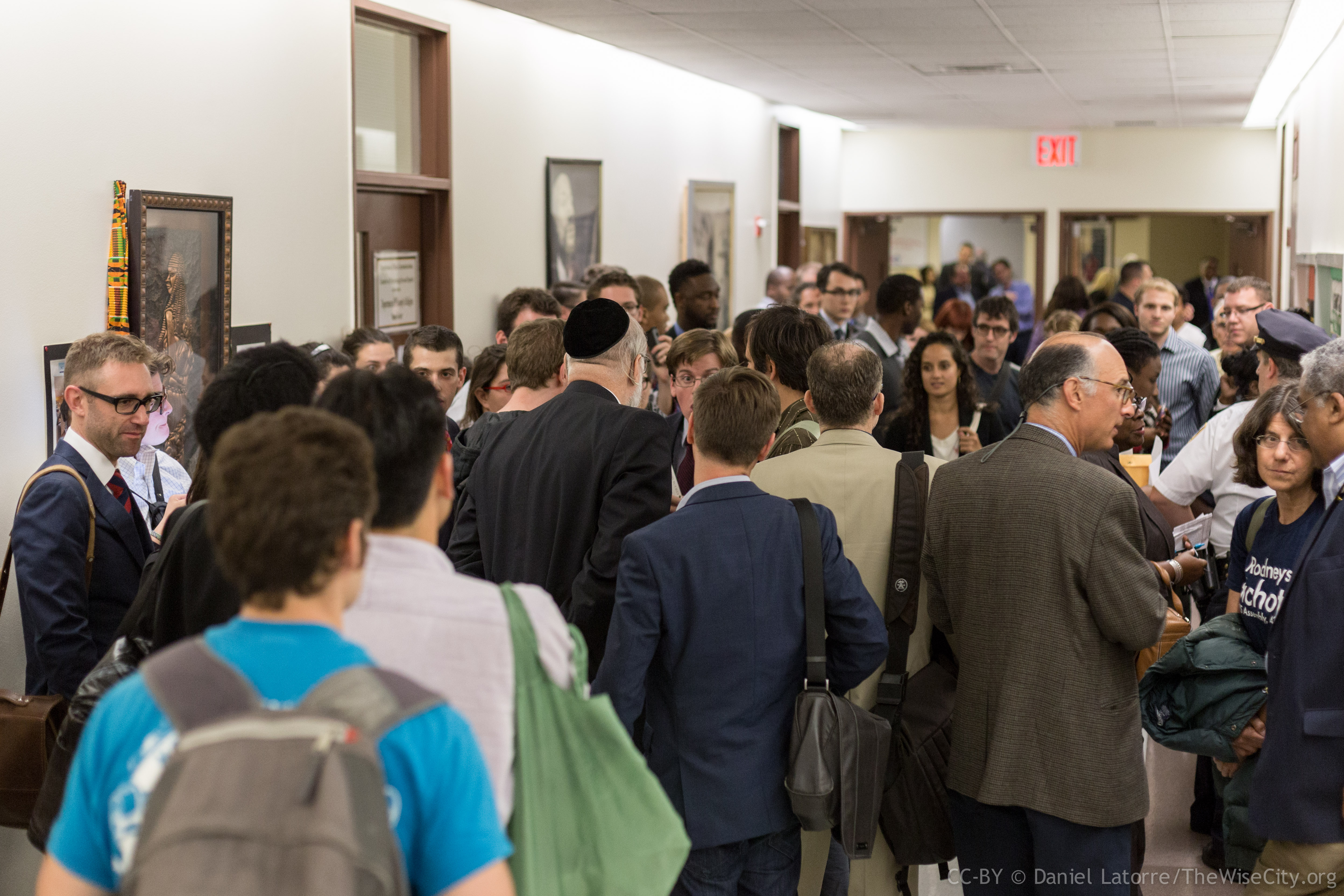
2014 Brooklyn Democratic Party meeting

New York City politicians often exert influence outside the city in response to the city's diverse ethnic constituencies. For example, in 1984 the New York City Comptroller’s Office under the direction of then-Comptroller Harrison J. Goldin developed with Irish Nobel Peace laureate Seán MacBride the MacBride Principles, which call on companies operating in Northern Ireland to increase employment opportunities for members of underrepresented religious groups, ban the display of provocative sectarian emblems in the workplace, promote security for minority employees and abolish hiring criteria that discriminate based on religion or ethnicity. A 2006 report by the New York City Comptroller's Office found that 88 US and Canadian corporations operating in Northern Ireland had agreed to independent monitoring of their compliance with the MacBride Principles.

Four of the top five zip codes in the United States for political contributions are in Manhattan. The top zip code, 10021 on the Upper East Side, generated the most money for the 2004 presidential campaigns of both George W. Bush and John Kerry.

== Operations ==
In 2008, New York City and London announced the Innovation Exchange Programme, in which the two cities will share best practices in government innovation. The program involves not only the formal exchange of ideas but also the transfer of personnel between the cities. It will focus on transparency and accountability, efficiency, transport, policy, education and skills, and environmental policy.
