= Every Texan =

American-based think tank

- Established: 1985
- Executive Director: Ann Beeson
- Budget: Revenue: $2,791,375; Expenses: $2,708,855 (FYE October 2015)
- Address: 7020 Easy Wind Drive, Suite 200; Austin, Texas 78752
- Location: Austin, Texas
- Website: everytexan.org

Every Texan, formerly known as the Center for Public Policy Priorities (CPPP), is an Austin-based, nonpartisan, nonprofit policy institute.

== Origin ==
The Congregation of Benedictine Sisters in Boerne, Texas, founded CPPP in 1985 to improve health care access for the poor. The center became an independent nonprofit corporation 1999. The Nation called CPPP an example of "sophisticated independent policy experts" and a state-level "force to be reckoned with." And according to The Dallas Morning News, the center "has emerged as the primary source for detailed analysis on almost any legislative issue affecting low- to moderate-income Texans." In May 2020, CPPP changed its name to Every Texan.

== Current research ==
The center provides research and policy analysis on issues such as:

- economic opportunity, including workforce and economic development;
- the state’s social services safety net, including health care, nutrition, and Temporary Assistance for Needy Families; and
- fiscal analysis of state taxes and budgets; the center provides tax and budget analysis from the perspective of low-income Texans.

The center is also home to the Texas KIDS COUNT Project, which tracks the well-being of children county by county.

== Board and staff ==
The center has a current staff of thirty-three. Senior staff includes Anne Dunkelberg, associate director, named 2007 Consumer Health Care Advocate of the Year by Families USA, and Dick Lavine, senior fiscal analyst, named Best Lobbyist for the Little Guy by Texas Monthly in 1999.

In June 2020 Every Texan United was formed and is affiliated with the Nonprofit Professional Employees Union (NPEU), a local of the International Federation of Professional and Technical Engineers. On August 16 2021 the first contract was ratified, the first NPEU in a right to work state.

Former board members include:

- Flora Brewer of Ft. Worth, former chair of the board of directors
- William P. Hobby Jr., the longest-serving lieutenant governor of Texas.
- F. Scott McCown retired as a state district judge in 2002 to become the executive director, who then left the center in 2013.
- Polly Ross Hughes
- Ann Beeson, executive director, starting in 2013

== National affiliations ==
CPPP is a member of several national networks:

- State Priorities Partnership
- KIDS COUNT Network
