= Elections in Switzerland =

Switzerland elects on national level a collective head of state, the Federal Council, and a legislature, the Federal Assembly.

== Background ==
The Federal Assembly (German: Bundesversammlung; French: Assemblée fédérale; Italian: Assemblea federale; Romansh: Assamblea federala) has two chambers. The National Council (German: Nationalrat; French: Conseil national; Italian: Consiglio nazionale; Romansh: Cussegl naziunal) has 200 members, elected for a four-year term by proportional representation in multi-seat constituencies, the cantons.

The Council of States (German: Ständerat; French: Conseil des Etats; Italian: Consiglio degli Statil Romansh: Cussegl dals Stadis) has 46 members, elected for four years in 20 two-seat (for full cantons) and 6 single-seat (for half-cantons) constituencies.

Under the Swiss Federal Constitution, the mode of election to the Council of States is left to the cantons, the provision being that it must be a democratic method. All cantons now provide for the councilors to be chosen by popular election, although historically it was typically the cantons' legislatures that elected representatives to Bern.

Despite this freedom the Constitution provides the cantons, with the exception of the cantons of Neuchâtel and Jura (which use proportional representation to elect their councilors), councilors are elected through an up to two-round system of voting. In the first round of voting, candidates must obtain an absolute majority of the vote in order to be elected. If no candidate receives an absolute majority in the first round of voting then a second round is held in which a simple plurality is sufficient to be elected. The top two finishing candidates in the second round are elected.

One of the members of the Federal Council assumes the honorific title of President of the Confederation for a one-year term.

Elections to the National Council conclude on the penultimate Sunday of October. In most cantons, the first round of the election for the Council of States is held alongside the National Council election, while runoff stages are held 3 to 6 weeks later. The new Federal Assembly takes office at the start of the following year.

Switzerland has a multi-party system with numerous parties. A highly unique characteristic of Switzerland is that all executives, from the federal level to even the smallest town at the municipal level, are led by a collective body of individuals (versus a single President or Prime Minister as in other countries). These executives often include members from several political parties.

== Federal elections ==
=== 2023 federal election ===
Federal elections were held in Switzerland on 22 October 2023 to elect all members of the National Council and Council of States (first round). There was a second round for the Council of States on 12 and 19 November. The elections were followed by elections to the Federal Council, Switzerland's government and collegial presidency, on 13 December.

==== National Council ====
Party	Votes	%	Seats	+/–
Swiss People's Party	713,471	27.93	62	+9
Social Democratic Party	466,714	18.27	41	+2
The Liberals	364,053	14.25	28	−1
The Centre	359,075	14.06	29	+1
Green Party	249,891	9.78	23	−5
Green Liberal Party	192,944	7.55	10	−6
Evangelical People's Party	49,828	1.95	2	−1
Federal Democratic Union	31,513	1.23	2	+1
Swiss Party of Labour	18,435	0.72	0	−1
Ticino League	14,160	0.55	1	0
Geneva Citizens' Movement	13,019	0.51	2	+2
Left-Alternative Greens	4,343	0.17	0	0
Christian Social Party	2,397	0.09	0	0
Swiss Democrats	2,030	0.08	0	0
Other parties	72,609	2.84	0	0
Total	2,554,482	100.00	200	–
Registered voters/turnout		46.6	+1.5	
Source: FSO

==== Council of States ====
31 of the 46 seats of the Council of States were filled in the first round, on 22 October 2023, with the remaining 15 seats filled in the second round, on 12 and 19 November.

Party	Seats		
Party	1st round	2nd round	Total
The Centre	10	5	15
The Liberals	9	2	11
Social Democratic Party	5	4	9
Swiss People's Party	4	2	6
Green Party	3		3
Geneva Citizens' Movement		1	1
Green Liberal Party		1	1
Total	31	15	46
Source: FSO

== See also ==
- Swiss Federal Council election
- Zauberformel
