= 2025 Manx local elections =

The 2025 Manx Local Authority elections were held on 24 April 2025. The elections were held in three local authorities (Castletown, Patrick and Peel) and two electoral wards of local authorities (Douglas South Ward and Ramsey South Ward). Elected representatives will serve a term of four years.

In all the other local authorities and wards, there were not enough candidates to require a contested election. In five electoral areas (Ballaugh parish commissioners; Douglas Central ward; Jurby parish commissioners; Port Erin village commissioners; Ramsey North ward), there were not enough candidates to fill the vacancies, and a by-election will be required to fill the remaining vacancies.

== Background ==
Nominations of candidates closed on 26 March 2025. Polling stations opened at 8am and closed at 8pm.

== Results ==
Successful candidates are shown in bold.

Castletown

7 commissioners were elected:

- **Tony Brown - 738**
- Beth Cannan
- **John Cringle -** **634**
- **William Galley - 345**
- Colin Leather
- **Alan Leonard - 490**
- **Mahendrakumar Patel - 599**
- **Carol Quine - 282**
- **Laurence Watterson - 457**

Patrick

5 commissioners were elected:

- **Robert Anderson - 221**
- Henry Bridson - 85
- **Gordon Clague - 250**
- **Paul Craker - 208**
- **Leo Cussons - 176**
- **Simon Mellor - 228**

== See also ==
- Elections in the Isle of Man
- Local government in the Isle of Man
- 2025 United Kingdom local elections
