= Elections in the Isle of Man =

The Isle of Man partially elects its legislature at the national level. The High Court of Tynwald consists of two chambers. The House of Keys has 24 members, elected in a general election for a five-year term in 12 two-seat constituencies. Each voter has two votes (but may choose to vote for only one candidate) and in each constituency the two candidates with the most votes are elected. The Legislative Council has 11 members: three ex-officio members and eight other members who are elected by the House of Keys for a five-year term. Political parties do not play an important role on the Island. The Isle of Man lowered its voting age from 18 to 16 in 2006.

== General elections ==
The House of Keys has 24 members, elected in a General Election for a five-year term in 12 two-seat constituencies. The Legislative Council has 11 members: three ex-officio members and eight other members who are elected by the House of Keys for a four-year term.

== Local elections ==
Local authorities and sheadings

There are elections for commissioners and councillors for the 21 local authorities on the Isle of Man, consisting of 4 town authorities, 2 district authorities, 2 village authorities, and 13 parish authorities.

- 2016 Manx Local Authority elections
- 2021 Manx Local Authority elections
  - 2021 Douglas borough council election
- 2025 Manx Local Authority elections

== Board of Education elections ==
Elections took place for the Board of Education until this was dissolved in 2009.

== Recent general elections ==
- 2001 Manx general election
- 2006 Manx general election
- 2011 Manx general election
- 2016 Manx general election
- 2021 Manx general election
- 2026 Manx general election

== Historic general elections ==
- 1971 Manx general election
- 1976 Manx general election
- 1981 Manx general election
- 1986 Manx general election
- 1991 Manx general election
- 1996 Manx general election

== See also ==
- House of Keys constituencies
- Electoral calendar
- Electoral system
