= 2025 Ascension general election =

A general election took place on Ascension Island on 3 July 2025 to elect members to the Ascension Island Council.

== Electoral system ==
The Island Council consists of either five or seven elected members, depending on the number of candidates. If there are eight or more candidates, seven members would be elected; if there were fewer than eight candidates, only five would be elected.

The five seats will be elected for three years terms by plurality-at-large voting. Voters are able to cast up to five votes.

== Results ==
Candidate	Votes	%	Notes
Eugene Leroy Bennett	145	15.71	Elected
Thomas Tyson George Hickling	140	15.17	Elected
Laura Marie Shearer	130	14.08	Re-elected
Thomas Barnes	119	12.89	Elected
Michael Duncan Ross Ellick	116	12.57	Elected
Alan Herbert Nicholls	111	12.03	Re-elected
Ethan Duncan Bally	89	9.64	Elected
Andrew Barry Newsom	73	7.91	
Total	923	100.00	
Total votes	207	–	
Registered voters/turnout	546	37.91	
Source: Government of Ascension Island
