= 2025 New York Proposal 1 =

- November 4, 2025
- Use of Mount Van Hoevenberg Sports Complex Land and Acquisition of 2,500 Acres for Adirondack Park Amendment

Results
Choice	Votes	%
Yes	1,932,337	52.09%
No	1,777,036	47.91%
Total votes	3,709,373	100.00%
Yes
70–80%
60–70%
50–60%
No
60–70%
50–60%

New York Proposal 1, officially the Use of Mount Van Hoevenberg Sports Complex Land and Acquisition of 2,500 Acres for Adirondack Park Amendment, is a legislatively referred constitutional amendment that appeared on the ballot in the U.S. state of New York on November 4, 2025, concurrent with the 2025 United States elections.

== Background ==
The Mount Van Hoevenberg Olympic Sports Complex has hosted various Olympic events, and serves as a training center for winter sports. Since it was built on state forest preserve land, it violated Article 14 of the New York Constitution, which states that "lands of the state, now owned or hereafter acquired, constituting the forest preserve as now fixed by law, shall be forever kept as wild forest lands." Protect the Adirondacks, an organization in support of the measure, pushed for this constitutional amendment to remedy the constitutional violation "after-the-fact." It was officially placed on the 2025 ballot after passing the New York State Legislature in a near-unanimous vote.

== Impact ==
If passed, the constitutional violation would be remedied, and New York State would be required to buy an additional 2,500 acres to be added into Adirondack Park. It would also allow the continued development of the Olympic venue on over 300 acres of land.

== Endorsements ==
Yes

Executive branch officials

- Andrew Cuomo, former Secretary of Housing and Urban Development (1997–2001) and governor of New York (2011–2021)

State legislators

- Peter Harckham, state senator from the 40th district (2019–present) (Democratic)
- Dan Stec, state senator from the 45th district (2021–present) (Republican)
- Zohran Mamdani, former state assemblymember from the 36th district (2021–2025) (Democratic)
- Billy Jones, former state assemblymember from the 115th district (2017–2025) (Democratic)

Organizations

- Citizens Union
- New York League of Conservation Voters
- Olympic Regional Development Authority
- Sierra Club Atlantic

Newspapers

- The East Hampton Star
- Newsday
- Pirate Wires
- Syracuse Post-Standard
No

Local officials

- Robert Holden, New York City councilmember from the 30th district (2018–present) (Democratic)

Individuals

- Curtis Sliwa, founder of the Guardian Angels

Labor unions

- United Federation of Teachers
- Hotel and Gaming Trades Council
- SEIU 32BJ

Organizations

- New York Young Republican Club
Declined to endorse

Labor unions

- Professional Staff Congress

Organizations

- Jews for Racial and Economic Justice
- League of Women Voters New York City

== Results ==
The proposal performed generally well across the state, winning 58 counties out of 62. However, all the remaining four were a part of New York City; the referendum fell in the Bronx, Queens, Kings and Richmond counties while winning in Manhattan. Overall, 54.5% of the votes cast in NYC were against, which represented 48.3% of the total votes in the election.

Use of Mount Van Hoevenberg Sports Complex Land and Acquisition of 2,500 Acres for Adirondack Park
Choice	Votes	%
For	1,999,703	51.94
Against	1,850,582	48.06
Total	3,850,285	100.00
Source: New York State Board of Elections
