= 2022 Colorado Proposition FF =

Proposition FF
- Reduce Income Tax Deduction Amounts to Fund School Meals Program Measure

Results
Choice	Votes	%
Yes	1,384,852	56.75%
No	1,055,583	43.25%
Valid votes	2,440,435	100.00%
Invalid or blank votes	0	0.00%
Total votes	2,440,435	100.00%
Registered voters/turnout	3,833,468	63.66%

For
80–90%
70–80%
60–70%
50–60%
Against
90–100%
80–90%
70–80%
60–70%
50–60%
Other
Tie
No data

Proposition FF is a statewide ballot measure that was passed in Colorado on November 8, 2022. If passed, the measure would create a program to provide access to free meals to all public school students in Colorado using funds from increased taxes on households with more than $300,000 in federal adjusted gross income.

== Contents ==
The measure appeared on the ballot as follows:

Shall state taxes be increased $100,727,820 annually by a change to the Colorado Revised Statutes that, to support healthy meals for public school students, increases state taxable income only for individuals who have federal taxable income of $300,000 or more by limiting itemized or standard state income tax deductions to $12,000 for single tax return filers and $16,000 for joint tax return filers, and, in connection therewith, creating the healthy school meals for all program to provide free school meals to students in public schools; providing grants for participating schools to purchase Colorado grown, raised, or processed products, to increase wages or provide stipends for employees who prepare and serve school meals, and to create parent and student advisory committees to provide advice to ensure school meals are healthy and appealing to all students; and creating a program to assist in promoting Colorado food products and preparing school meals using basic nutritious ingredients with minimal reliance on processed products?
