= Texas Farm Bureau =

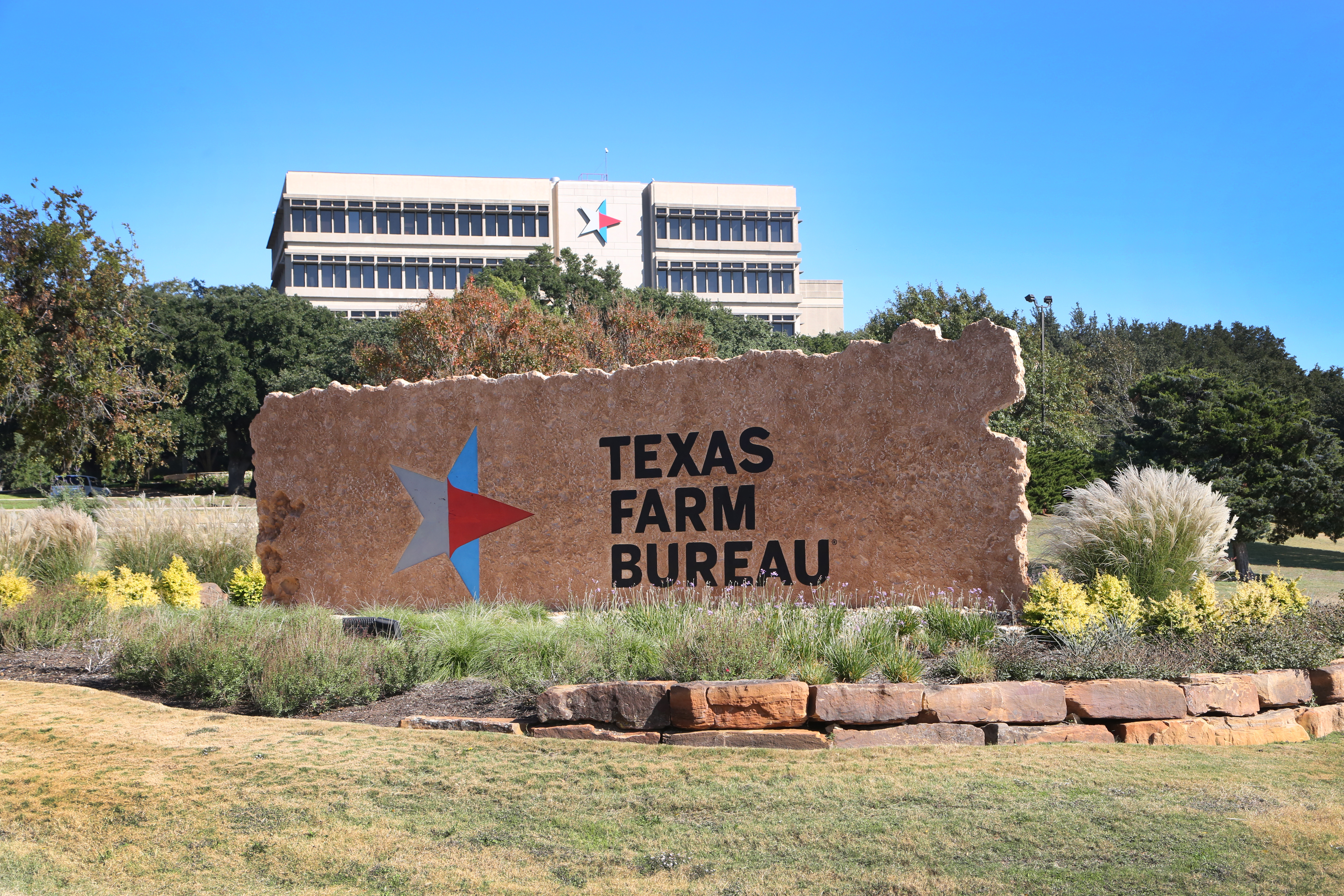
Texas Farm Bureau state office in Waco, Texas

Texas Farm Bureau, Texas's largest farm organization, represents the interests of agricultural producers and rural communities across Texas as the "Voice of Texas Agriculture." Texas Farm Bureau's grassroots structure begins in local communities across the state of Texas. The non-profit organization's direction and decision making are dictated by its members.

Farm Bureau supports farmers and ranchers and advocates for a safe and affordable American food supply. Members create and shape the organization's position on policy, and organization leadership works to implement the policy to benefit Texas agriculture.

== Texas agriculture ==
Texas leads the nation in cattle, cotton, sheep and wool, goats and mohair, and hay production. Texas also has the most farms and ranches and the highest value of farm real estate in the United States. A total of 127,036,184 acres (514,097.20 km^{2}) in Texas are occupied by the state's 248,416 farms and ranches.

Texas agriculture yields $24.92 billion annually in cash receipts. The most profitable commodities, according to the 2017 Census of Agriculture, are: cattle, poultry, eggs, cotton and cottonseed, dairy, grains, oil seeds and dry beans, nursery, greenhouse, horticulture and hay.

The agriculture industry is evolving rapidly to keep up with an expanding global population. Farmers and ranchers have adopted technologies to improve their efficiency and produce more food on the same amount of land.

In 1940, the American farmer produced enough food to feed 19 people each year.

Seven decades later, in 2010, the American farmer fed 155 people annually.

== Structure ==
Texas Farm Bureau consists of 205 independent, self-governed county Farm Bureaus. Each county Farm Bureau elects its own board of directors and officers. Texas Farm Bureau members are not required to be agricultural producers. Membership is open to anyone interested in supporting Texas’ rural communities and agricultural operations. Farm Bureau members pay annual dues, which cover a variety of member services and benefits.

County Farm Bureaus are organized into 13 districts across Texas. Each district elects a director to serve on the board of the state organization. State directors may be elected to a maximum of three two-year terms.

At the state level, members elect a president each year at the organization's annual meeting. The president serves on the state board of directors and guides volunteer leadership. Texas Farm Bureau also is led by an executive director, who is employed by the organization to oversee the daily operations of Texas Farm Bureau and Affiliated Companies. Historically, both the president and executive director have had extensive experience in the agricultural industry.

Texas Farm Bureau members convene each year at the annual meeting, where they vote on proposed resolutions to be included in the organization's policy book. All approved resolutions are included in member-directed policy, which governs the organization's response to current agricultural and rural issues.

Nationally, Texas Farm Bureau is affiliated with the American Farm Bureau Federation—a network of more than 6 million members across all 50 states.

== History ==
The Texas Farm Bureau was established in 1933. During the Great Depression, Texas Farm Bureau was reorganized as the “Texas Agricultural Association” on March 6, 1934, in Dallas. In 1938, Texas Agricultural Association members voted to move the headquarters 90 miles (140 km) south to Waco. The organization operated for seven years under that name until members voted to restore the organization back to “Texas Farm Bureau” in 1941.

Over the next 70 years, Texas Farm Bureau grew from 15,630 member families to more than 500,000 member families.

During its history, the organization has helped bring electricity and phone service to rural communities, establish a successful farm-to-market road system in Texas and enact effective national farm policy.

== Services ==
Texas Farm Bureau works with legislators in Austin and Washington, D.C., as well as frequently addresses issues in the courts and in the regulatory process, to support the needs of farmers and ranchers in rural Texas.

The organization's communications products keep members informed of current legislation and issues that affect their daily operations. Texas Farm Bureau produces two member publications: Texas Agriculture for agricultural producers and Texas Neighbors for non-producing members. News services also include a television program, “Voices of Agriculture,” on RFD-TV, and the “Texas Farm Bureau Radio Network,” which has more than 60 affiliate radio stations across Texas.

The organization also connects with its statewide membership through its website and by participating in social media, including Facebook, Twitter and Instagram. TFB also has a consumer-oriented blog, Texas Table Top, and a weekly editorial, Your Texas Agriculture Minute.

Several programs and services are offered to Texas Farm Bureau members. Many focus on developing rural youth and educating the public about agriculture, such as Ag in the Classroom; the Planet Agriculture exhibit; AgLead and FarmLead; youth scholarships; and the Young Farmers and Ranchers program. Additional member services include insurance and other financial services; estate planning; trespassing rewards; and commodity market information.

== Drought in Texas ==
In 2011, Texas farmers and ranchers experienced one of the worst droughts on record. As of August 2011, the state's economic losses to agriculture totaled $5.2 billion as a result of extreme drought conditions. The 2011 Southern US drought spread across the entire lower-third of the United States, and in Texas, 213 of the 254 counties were declared primary natural disaster areas. Scarce water supplies are destroying crops and livestock herds throughout the region.

Extreme drought conditions spurred wildfires, which burned almost 3.5 million acres (14,000 km^{2}) of land in Texas since the fire season began on Nov. 15, 2010. Farmers and ranchers, as well as rural Texas residents, have relied on the Texas Forest Service, volunteer fire departments and other federal and state agencies to protect their homes and land from the 18,300 fires reported. Farmers and ranchers can receive assistance during the drought from their county Farm Bureau office, as well as from the state organization through the Texas Farm Bureau drought website.

== See also ==
- American Farm Bureau Federation
- Texas rice production
