= 2026 Jefferson County, Alabama Commission election =

Alabama local election

2026 Jefferson County Commission election
- November 3, 2026

All 5 seats up for election 3 seats needed for a majority
Party	Republican	Democratic
Current seats	3	2
Seats needed	Steady	▲1
- Incumbents: Democratic incumbent Republican incumbent

The 2026 Jefferson County Commission election was held on November 3, 2026, to elect all five members of the Jefferson County Commission. Primary elections were held on May 19.

== Background ==
=== McClure et al. v. Jefferson County Commission ===
In 2023, a lawsuit was filed against the commission alleging racial gerrymandering. The case went to trial on January 13, 2025. On September 16, 2025, Madeline Haikala, a district judge of the United States District Court for the Northern District of Alabama, ruled that the map violated the Fourteenth Amendment, ordering a new one to be drawn with an additional Black-majority district. Haikala denied an appeal by the county on September 25. The United States Court of Appeals for the Eleventh Circuit paused Haikala's ruling, meaning that the maps will stay in place for the 2026 election.

== District 1 ==
=== Democratic primary ===
==== Candidates ====
===== Nominee =====
- Lashunda Scales, incumbent commissioner

===== Eliminated in primary =====
- Clinton Woods, member of the Birmingham City Council (2019–present)

===== Did not file =====
- Shonae Eddins-Bennett, Birmingham parks and recreation director

==== Results ====
Democratic primary
Party	Candidate	Votes	%
Democratic	Lashunda Scales (incumbent)	17,110	60.19
Democratic	Clinton Woods	11,316	39.81
Total votes		28,426	100.00

=== General election ===
==== Results ====
2026 Jefferson County Commission election, district 1
Party	Candidate	Votes	%
Democratic	Lashunda Scales (incumbent)		
Write-in			
Total votes			100.00

== District 2 ==
=== Democratic primary ===
==== Candidates ====
===== Nominee =====
- Sheila Tyson, incumbent commissioner

=== General election ===
==== Results ====
2026 Jefferson County Commission election, district 2
Party	Candidate	Votes	%
Democratic	Sheila Tyson (incumbent)		
Write-in			
Total votes			100.00

== District 3 ==
=== Republican primary ===
==== Nominee ====
- Jimmie Stephens, incumbent commissioner

=== Democratic primary ===
==== Candidates ====
===== Nominee =====
- Camara Blue, pastor and former firefighter

===== Eliminated in primary =====
- Dock Scott

==== Results ====
Democratic primary
Party	Candidate	Votes	%
Democratic	Camara Blue	11,759	84.73
Democratic	Dock Scott	2,119	15.27
Total votes		13,878	100.00

=== General election ===
==== Results ====
2026 Jefferson County Commission election, district 3
Party	Candidate	Votes	%
Republican	Jimmie Stephens (incumbent)		
Democratic	Camara Blue		
Write-in			
Total votes			100.00

== District 4 ==
=== Republican primary ===
==== Candidates ====
===== Nominee =====
- Joe Knight, incumbent commissioner

=== General election ===
==== Results ====
2026 Jefferson County Commission election, district 4
Party	Candidate	Votes	%
Republican	Joe Knight (incumbent)		
Write-in			
Total votes			100.00

== District 5 ==
=== Republican primary ===
==== Candidates ====
===== Nominee =====
- Mike Bolin, incumbent commissioner and former Supreme Court of Alabama associate justice

=== General election ===
==== Results ====
2026 Jefferson County Commission election, district 5
Party	Candidate	Votes	%
Republican	Mike Bolin (incumbent)		
Write-in			
Total votes			100.00
