= 2022 Jefferson County, Alabama Commission election =

Alabama local election

2022 Jefferson County Commission election
- November 8, 2022

All 5 seats up for election
	Majority party	Minority party
Party	Republican	Democratic
Seats before	3	2
Seats after	3	2
Seat change	Steady	Steady
Popular vote	88,024	60,784
Percentage	55.9%	38.6%
Swing	▲5.2%	▼7.8%

The 2022 Jefferson County Commission election was held on November 8, 2022, to elect all members to the Jefferson County, Alabama Commission. Primary elections were held on May 22, 2022.

== District 1 ==
=== Democratic primary ===
==== Candidates ====
===== Nominee =====
- Lashunda Scales, incumbent commissioner

=== General election ===
==== Results ====
Jefferson County Commission District 1
Party	Candidate	Votes	%
Democratic	Lashunda Scales	31,208	98.78
Write-in		384	1.22
Total votes		31,592	100.00

== District 2 ==
=== Democratic primary ===
==== Candidates ====
===== Nominee =====
- Sheila Tyson, incumbent commissioner

===== Eliminated in primary =====
- Steve Small Jr., former commissioner

==== Results ====
Democratic primary
Party	Candidate	Votes	%
Democratic	Sheila Tyson	13,042	86.50
Democratic	Steve Small Jr.	2,036	13.50
Total votes		15,078	100.00

=== General election ===
==== Results ====
Jefferson County Commission District 2
Party	Candidate	Votes	%
Democratic	Sheila Tyson	29,576	98.99
Write-in		302	1.01
Total votes		29,878	100.00

== District 3 ==
=== Republican primary ===
==== Candidates ====
===== Nominee =====
- Jimmie Stephens, incumbent commissioner

=== Libertarian convention ===
==== Nominee ====
- Devin Cordell, defense contractor

=== General election ===
==== Results ====
Jefferson County Commission District 3
Party	Candidate	Votes	%
Republican	Jimmie Stephens	29,302	82.88
Libertarian	Devin Cordell	5,709	16.15
Write-in		342	0.97
Total votes		35,353	100.00

== District 4 ==
=== Republican primary ===
==== Candidates ====
===== Nominee =====
- Joe Knight, incumbent commissioner

=== General election ===
==== Results ====
Jefferson County Commission District 4
Party	Candidate	Votes	%
Republican	Joe Knight (incumbent)	28,347	96.31
Write-in		1,086	3.69
Total votes		29,433	100.00

== District 5 ==
=== Republican primary ===
==== Candidates ====
===== Nominee =====
- Steve Ammons, incumbent commissioner

=== General election ===
==== Results ====
Jefferson County Commission District 5
Party	Candidate	Votes	%
Republican	Steve Ammons	30,375	97.18
Write-in		883	2.82
Total votes		31,258	100.00
