= 2021 Birmingham, Alabama, mayoral election =

2021 Birmingham mayoral election
- August 24, 2021
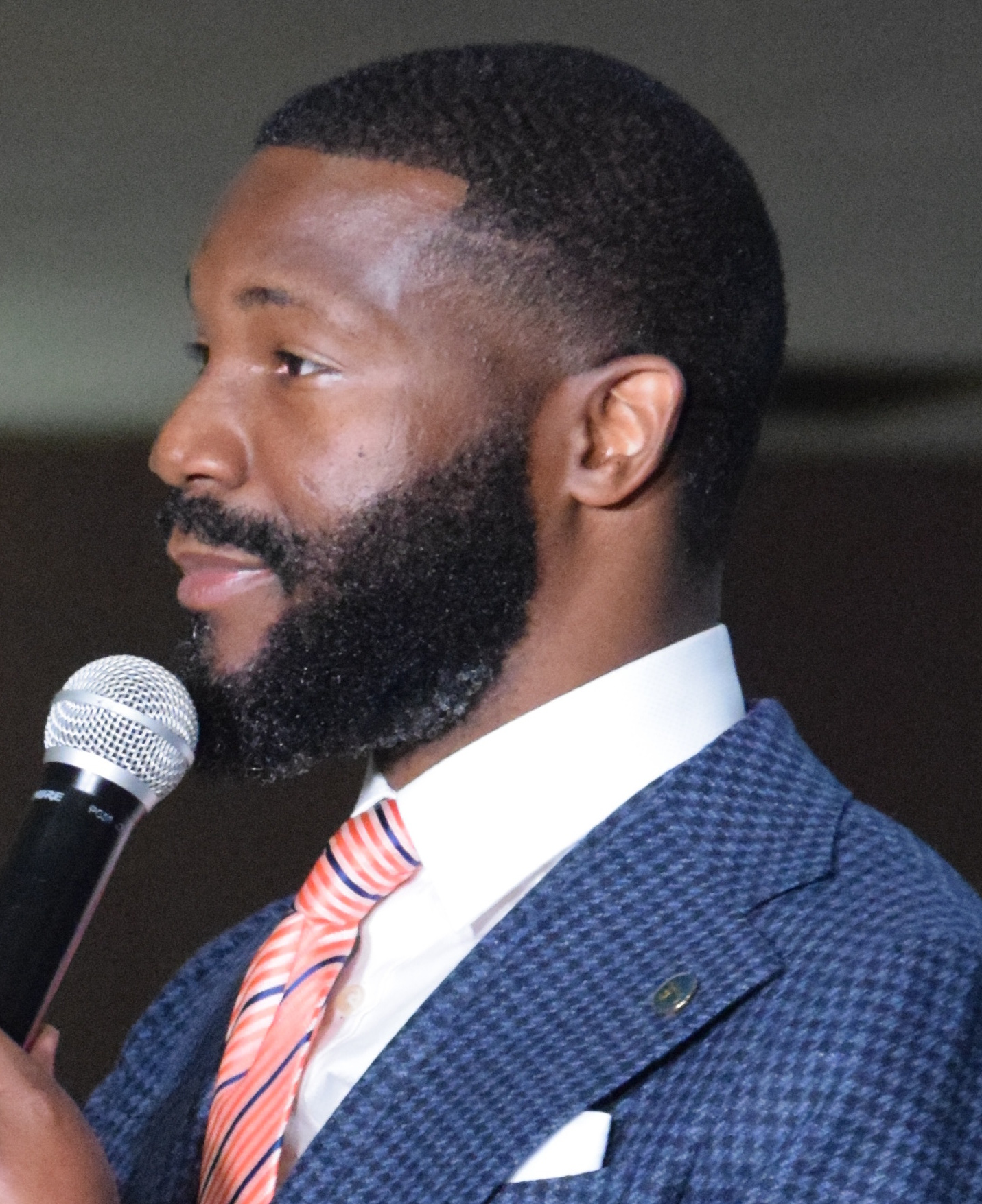

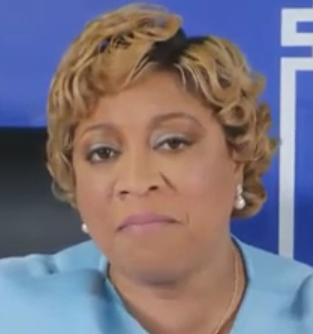

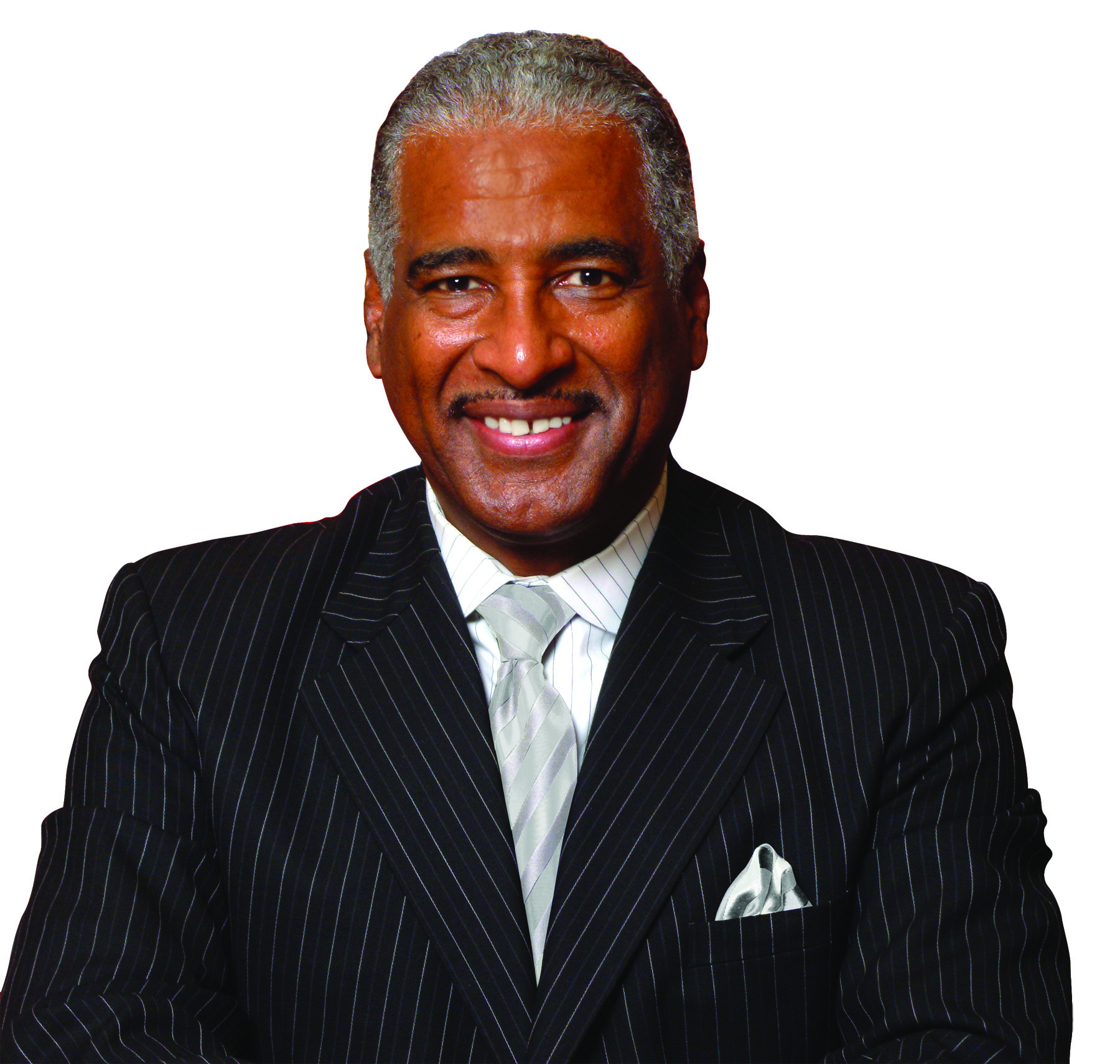
Candidate	Randall Woodfin	Lashunda Scales	William Bell
Party	Nonpartisan	Nonpartisan	Nonpartisan
Popular vote	23,616	7,625	3,354
Percentage	64.3%	20.8%	9.1%
Mayor before election
Randall Woodfin
Democratic
Elected Mayor
Randall Woodfin
Democratic

The 2021 Birmingham mayoral election was held on August 24, 2021, to elect the mayor of Birmingham, Alabama. Incumbent Democratic mayor Randall Woodfin was re-elected to a second term.

== Background ==
Woodfin was first elected in 2017, defeating incumbent mayor William Bell in a runoff. He was a keynote speaker at the 2020 Democratic National Convention. During his first term, he faced criticism for furloughing some city employees during the COVID-19 pandemic, committing $3 million per year to the Protective Stadium, creating a city-funded scholarship program, and replacing Birmingham's police chief, though he has defended all the aforementioned decisions. In his reelection campaign, Woodfin primarily touted his accomplishments in renovating several dilapidated areas of the city and reforming the city's police department. A primary issue in the campaign was the results of the 2020 United States census, which showed that Huntsville had surpassed Birmingham as Alabama's most populous city. Woodfin believed that Birmingham's population loss was due to a brain drain, and pointed out that the aforementioned scholarship program could help keep high school graduates in the city.

== Candidates ==
=== Confirmed ===
- Cerissa Brown, mental health advocate
- William Bell, former mayor
- Napoleon Gonzalez
- Philemon Hill, mechanical engineer and candidate for mayor in 2017
- Lashunda Scales, President pro tempore of the Jefferson County commission
- Darryl Williams, house refurbisher
- Randall Woodfin, incumbent mayor
- Chris Woods, businessman, former National Football League player, nephew of Abraham Woods, and candidate for mayor in 1995 and 2017

== Endorsements ==
Cerissa Brown

PACs

- American Youth for Climate Action
- Future Generations PAC
Lashunda Scales

State legislators

- John Rogers, state representative

Individuals

- Buck Johnson, former professional basketball player
Randall Woodfin

U.S. Presidents

- Joe Biden, 46th President of the United States, former 47th Vice President of the United States (2009–2017), former U.S. Senator from Delaware (1973–2009)

U.S. Senators

- Cory Booker, U.S. Senator from New Jersey (2015–president) and candidate for president in 2020
- Doug Jones, former U.S. Senator from Alabama (2018–2021)

State legislators

- Stacey Abrams, founder of Fair Fight Action and former Minority Leader of the Georgia House of Representatives
- Rolanda Hollis, state representative

Local officials

- Richard Arrington, former mayor of Birmingham
- Sheila Tyson, Jefferson County commissioner
- Hunter Williams, Birmingham city councillor

Individuals

- Nina Turner, activist, former Ohio State Senator and candidate for OH-11 in 2021

Organizations

- Alabama New South Coalition
- Central Alabama Labor Coalition
- College Democrats of Alabama
- High School Democrats of Alabama
- Human Rights Campaign

Labor unions

- Central Alabama AFL–CIO
- Communications Workers of America

PACs

- The Collective PAC
Chris Woods

Judges

- U. W. Clemon, former justice on the U.S. District Court for the Northern District of Alabama

== Polling ==
Poll source	Date(s) administered	Sample size	Margin of error	Randall Woodfin	William Bell	Lashaunda Scales	Others	Undecided
Birmingham Times	May 11–June 4, 2021	250 (LV)	± 6.2%	52%	10%	11%	4% (Note: Cerissa Brown and Chris Woods with 2%, Philemon Hill and Darryl Williams with 0%)	23%
Chism Strategies	April 1–5, 2021	662 (LV)	± 3.9%	49%	14%	12%	21%	–

== Debates ==
2021 Birmingham mayoral election debates
No.	Date & Time	Host(s)	Moderator(s)	Link	Participants							
Key: P Participant N Non-invitee I Invitee					Brown	Bell	Gonzalez	Hill	Scales	Williams	Woodfin	Woods
1	August 13, 2021	WVTM; WATV	Lisa Crane	Video	N	P	N	N	P	N	P	P
2	August 17, 2021; 6:30 p.m. CDT	Birmingham Times; Summit Media; CBS 42; WBHM; Birmingham Association of Black Journalists	Janae Pierre	Video	P	P	N	P	P	P	P	N

=== Results ===
General election results
Candidate	Votes	%
Randall Woodfin (incumbent)	23,616	64.33
Lashaunda Scales	7,625	20.77
William Bell	3,354	9.14
Chris Woods	1,562	4.23
Cerissa Brown	236	0.64
Philemon Hill	149	0.41
Darryl Williams	120	0.33
Napoleon Gonzalez	47	0.13
Total votes	36,709	100.00
