= 2020 United States presidential election in Alabama =

- November 3, 2020
- Turnout: 63.1% (▼3.7)

Nominee	Donald Trump	Joe Biden
Party	Republican	Democratic
Home state	Florida	Delaware
Running mate	Mike Pence	Kamala Harris
Electoral vote	9	0
Popular vote	1,441,170	849,624
Percentage	62.03%	36.57%

Trump
40–50%
50–60%
60–70%
70–80%
80–90%
90–100%
Biden
40–50%
50–60%
60–70%
70–80%
80–90%
90–100%
Tie/No Data
President before election
Donald Trump
Republican
Elected President
Joe Biden
Democratic

The 2020 United States presidential election in Alabama took place on Tuesday, November 3, 2020, as part of the 2020 United States presidential election in which all 50 states and the District of Columbia participated. Alabama voters chose nine electors to represent them in the Electoral College via a popular vote pitting incumbent Republican President Donald Trump and his running mate, incumbent Vice President Mike Pence, against Democratic challenger and former Vice President Joe Biden and his running mate, United States Senator Kamala Harris of California. Also on the ballot was the Libertarian nominee, psychology lecturer Jo Jorgensen and her running mate, entrepreneur and podcaster Spike Cohen. Write-in candidates were permitted without registration, and their results were not individually counted.

Prior to the election, all 14 news organizations making predictions considered this a state Trump would win, or otherwise a safe red state. Trump won the state with 62.03% of the vote to Biden's 36.57%.

== Primary elections ==
The primary elections were held on Super Tuesday, March 3, 2020.

=== Republican primary ===
As one of the Super Tuesday states, little campaigning has been done here, and the focus had been on the highly competitive Republican senatorial primary, which was expected to boost turnout.

Former Massachusetts Governor Bill Weld challenged incumbent president Donald Trump in the Republican primary in Alabama. Trump received 96.22% of the vote and all 50 delegates, while Weld received only 1.52% of the vote. Uncommitted votes made up the other 2.27%.

2020 Alabama Republican presidential primary
Candidate	Popular vote		Delegates
Candidate	Count	Percentage	Delegates
Donald Trump (incumbent)	695,470	96.22%	50
Bill Weld	10,962	1.52%	0
Uncommitted	16,378	2.27%	0
Total	722,809	100%	50

=== Democratic primary ===
Biden won the Alabama primary with 63.28% of the vote, winning 44 delegates. Bernie Sanders came in second place with 16.54% of the vote, getting 8 delegates. No other candidates won any delegates from Alabama.

Popular vote share by county Biden—40–50% Biden—50–60% Biden—60–70% Biden—70–80%

2020 Alabama Democratic presidential primary
Candidate	Votes	%	Delegates
Joe Biden	286,065	63.28	44
Bernie Sanders	74,755	16.54	8
Michael Bloomberg	52,750	11.67	
Elizabeth Warren	25,847	5.72	
Michael Bennet (withdrawn) (Note: Candidate withdrew after the New Hampshire primary when absentee voting had already begun.)	2,250	0.50	
Pete Buttigieg (withdrawn) (Note: Candidate withdrew shortly before the primary when absentee voting had already begun.)	1,416	0.31	
Tom Steyer (withdrawn)	1,048	0.23	
Tulsi Gabbard	1,038	0.23	
Amy Klobuchar (withdrawn)	907	0.20	
Andrew Yang (withdrawn)	875	0.19	
Cory Booker (withdrawn) (Note: Candidate withdrew during the first days of the absentee voting period.)	740	0.16	
John Delaney (withdrawn)	294	0.07	
Marianne Williamson (withdrawn)	224	0.05	
Julian Castro (withdrawn)	184	0.04	
Uncommitted	3,700	0.82	
Total	452,093	100%	52

== General election ==
=== Predictions ===
Source	Ranking	As of
The Cook Political Report	Safe R	November 3, 2020
Inside Elections	Safe R	November 3, 2020
Sabato's Crystal Ball	Safe R	November 3, 2020
Politico	Safe R	November 3, 2020
RCP	Safe R	November 3, 2020
Niskanen	Safe R	November 3, 2020
CNN	Safe R	November 3, 2020
The Economist	Safe R	November 3, 2020
CBS News (Note: CBS News' presidential election ratings uniquely do not contain a category for Safe/Solid races.)	Likely R	November 3, 2020
270towin	Safe R	November 3, 2020
ABC News	Safe R	November 3, 2020
NPR (Note: NPR's presidential election ratings uniquely do not contain a category for Safe/Solid races.)	Likely R	November 3, 2020
NBC News	Safe R	November 3, 2020
538	Safe R	November 3, 2020

=== Polling ===
View source data.

Aggregate polls

Source of poll aggregation	Dates administered	Dates updated	Joe Biden Democratic	Donald Trump Republican	Other/ Undecided (Note: Calculated by taking the difference of 100% and all other candidates combined.)	Margin
270 to Win	September 1 – October 13, 2020	October 27, 2020	38.0%	58.0%	4.0%	Trump +20.0
FiveThirtyEight	until November 2, 2020	November 3, 2020	37.8%	57.4%	4.8%	Trump +19.5
Average			37.9%	57.7%	4.4%	Trump +19.8

Polls

Poll source	Date(s) administered	Sample size (Note: Key: A – all adults RV – registered voters LV – likely voters V – unclear)	Margin of error	Donald Trump Republican	Joe Biden Democratic	Jo Jorgensen Libertarian	Other	Undecided
SurveyMonkey/Axios	Oct 20 – Nov 2, 2020	1,808 (LV)	± 3.5%	62% (Note: Overlapping sample with the previous SurveyMonkey/Axios poll, but more information available regarding sample size)	36%	–	–	–
Swayable	Oct 27 – Nov 1, 2020	330 (LV)	± 7.9%	55%	38%	7%	–	–
Data for Progress	Oct 27 – Nov 1, 2020	1,045 (LV)	± 3%	58%	38%	3%	1%	0% (Note: "Other candidate or write-in" with 0%)
Auburn University At Montgomery	Oct 23–28, 2020	853 (LV)	± 4.4%	58%	39%	–	3%	–
SurveyMonkey/Axios	Oct 1–28, 2020	3,363 (LV)	–	61%	37%	–	–	–
Swayable	Oct 23–26, 2020	266 (LV)	± 7.8%	56%	37%	7%	–	–
Moore Information (R) (Note: Poll sponsored by Tommy Tuberville's campaign.)	Oct 11–14, 2020	504 (LV)	± 4.5%	55%	38%	–	–	–
Auburn University at Montgomery	Sep 30 – Oct 3, 2020	1,072 (RV)	± 4.0%	57%	37%	–	6%	–
SurveyMonkey/Axios	Sep 1–30, 2020	1,354 (LV)	–	59%	39%	–	–	2%
SurveyMonkey/Axios	Aug 1–31, 2020	1,220 (LV)	–	65%	33%	–	–	2%
Tyson Group/Consumer Energy Alliance (Note: The Consumer Energy Alliance is a pro-Keystone XL lobbying group)	Aug 17–19, 2020	600 (LV)	± 4%	48%	44%	0%	0% (Note: "Refused" with 0%)	7%
Morning Consult	Jul 24 – Aug 2, 2020	609 (LV)	± 4.0%	58%	36%	–	2% (Note: "Someone else" with 2%)	4%
SurveyMonkey/Axios	Jul 1–31, 2020	1,583 (LV)	–	63%	35%	–	–	2%
Auburn University at Montgomery	Jul 2–9, 2020	567 (RV)	± 5.1%	55%	41%	–	4%	1%
SurveyMonkey/Axios	Jun 8–30, 2020	649 (LV)	–	63%	35%	–	–	2%
FM3 Research/Doug Jones (Note: Poll sponsored by Doug Jones' campaign)	May 14–18, 2020	601 (LV)	± 4%	53%	39%	–	–	–
Mason-Dixon	Feb 4–6, 2020	625 (RV)	± 4%	58%	38%	–	–	4%
WPA Intelligence	Jan 7–9, 2020	500 (LV)	–	59%	38%	–	–	3%

Former candidates

Donald Trump vs. Michael Bloomberg

Poll source	Date(s) administered	Sample size	Margin of error	Donald Trump (R)	Michael Bloomberg (D)	Undecided
Mason-Dixon	Feb 4–6, 2020	625 (RV)	± 4%	54%	40%	6%

Donald Trump vs. Pete Buttigieg

Poll source	Date(s) administered	Sample size	Margin of error	Donald Trump (R)	Pete Buttigieg (D)	Undecided
Mason-Dixon	Feb 4–6, 2020	625 (RV)	± 4%	58%	37%	5%

Donald Trump vs. Bernie Sanders

Poll source	Date(s) administered	Sample size	Margin of error	Donald Trump (R)	Bernie Sanders (D)	Undecided
Mason-Dixon	Feb 4–6, 2020	625 (RV)	± 4%	60%	37%	3%
WPA Intelligence	Jan 7–9, 2020	500 (LV)	–	59%	37%	4%

Donald Trump vs. Elizabeth Warren

Poll source	Date(s) administered	Sample size	Margin of error	Donald Trump (R)	Elizabeth Warren (D)	Undecided
Mason-Dixon	Feb 4–6, 2020	625 (RV)	± 4%	62%	35%	3%

Hypothetical polling

With generic opponent

Poll source	Date(s) administered	Sample size	Margin of error	Donald Trump (R)	Generic opponent	Undecided
JMC Analytics	Dec 16–18, 2019	525 (LV)	± 4.3%	54%	42% (Note: "Trump does not deserve to be re-elected" with 42% as opposed to "Trump deserves to be re-elected")	3%

=== Fundraising ===
According to the Federal Election Commission, in 2019 and 2020, Donald Trump and his interest groups raised $4,412,645.01, Joe Biden and his interest groups raised $2,412,420.93, and Jo Jorgensen raised $8,172.29 from Alabama-based contributors.

=== Candidate ballot access ===
- Donald Trump / Mike Pence, Republican
- Joe Biden / Kamala Harris, Democratic
- Jo Jorgensen / Spike Cohen, Libertarian

In addition, write-in candidates were allowed without registration, and their votes were not counted individually.

=== Electoral slates ===
The voters of Alabama cast their ballots for electors, or representatives to the Electoral College, rather than directly for the President and Vice President. Alabama is allocated 9 electors because it has 7 congressional districts and 2 senators. All candidates who appear on the ballot or qualify to receive write-in votes must submit a list of 9 electors who pledge to vote for their candidate and their running mate. Whoever wins the most votes in the state is awarded all 9 electoral votes. Their chosen electors then vote for president and vice president. Although electors are pledged to their candidate and running mate, they are not obligated to vote for them. An elector who votes for someone other than their candidate is known as a faithless elector. In the state of Alabama, a faithless elector's vote is counted and not penalized.

The electors of each state and the District of Columbia met on December 15, 2020, to cast their votes for president and vice president. All 9 pledged electors from Alabama cast their votes for President Donald Trump and Vice President Mike Pence. The Electoral College itself never meets as one body. Instead, the electors from each state and the District of Columbia met in their respective capitols. The electoral vote was tabulated and certified by Congress in a joint session on January 6, 2021, per the Electoral Count Act.

These electors were nominated by each party in order to vote in the Electoral College should their candidate win the state:

Donald Trump and Mike Pence Republican Party	Joe Biden and Kamala Harris Democratic Party	Jo Jorgensen and Spike Cohen Libertarian Party
Jacquelyn Gay; Jeana S. Boggs; Joseph R. Fuller; John H. Killian; J. Elbert Peters; Joan Reynolds; Rick Pate; Dennis H. Beavers; John Wahl	Brooke Tanner Battle; Linda Coleman-Madison; Earl Hilliard Jr. Sigfredo Rubio; Lashunda Scales; James Box Spearman; Patricia Todd; Sheila Tyson; Ralph Young	Pascal Bruijn; Lorelei Koory; Shane A. Taylor; Jason Matthew Shelby; Elijah J. Boyd; Dennis J. Knizley; Laura Chancey Lane; Anthony G. Peebles; Franklin R. Dillman

=== Results ===
State senate district results: Trump 50–60% 60–70% 70–80% 80–90% / Biden 50–60% 60–70% 70–80% 80–90%

2020 United States presidential election in Alabama
Party	Candidate	Votes	%	±%
Republican	Donald Trump (incumbent) Mike Pence (incumbent)	1,441,170	62.03	−0.05
Democratic	Joe Biden Kamala Harris	849,624	36.57	+2.21
Independent (Note: Jorgensen and Cohen were nominated by the Libertarian Party of Alabama but placed on the ballot as independents because the party did not have ballot access.)	Jo Jorgensen Spike Cohen	25,176	1.08	−1.01
Write-in		7,312	0.31	−0.71
Total votes		2,323,282	100.00	N/A

==== By county ====
County	Donald Trump Republican		Joe Biden Democratic		Various candidates Other parties		Margin		Total
County	#	%	#	%	#	%	#	%	Total
Autauga	19,838	71.44%	7,503	27.02%	429	1.54%	12,335	44.42%	27,770
Baldwin	83,544	76.17%	24,578	22.41%	1,557	1.42%	58,966	53.76%	109,679
Barbour	5,622	53.45%	4,816	45.79%	80	0.76%	806	7.66%	10,518
Bibb	7,525	78.43%	1,986	20.70%	84	0.88%	5,539	57.73%	9,595
Blount	24,711	89.57%	2,640	9.57%	237	0.86%	22,071	80.00%	27,588
Bullock	1,146	24.84%	3,446	74.70%	21	0.46%	-2,300	-49.86%	4,613
Butler	5,458	57.53%	3,965	41.79%	65	0.69%	1,493	15.74%	9,488
Calhoun	35,101	68.85%	15,216	29.85%	666	1.31%	19,885	39.00%	50,983
Chambers	8,753	57.27%	6,365	41.64%	166	1.09%	2,388	15.62%	15,284
Cherokee	10,583	86.03%	1,624	13.20%	94	0.76%	8,959	72.83%	12,301
Chilton	16,085	83.30%	3,073	15.91%	152	0.79%	13,012	67.38%	19,310
Choctaw	4,296	57.56%	3,127	41.89%	41	0.55%	1,169	15.66%	7,464
Clarke	7,324	55.76%	5,755	43.81%	56	0.43%	1,569	11.95%	13,135
Clay	5,601	80.82%	1,267	18.28%	62	0.89%	4,334	62.54%	6,930
Cleburne	6,484	89.72%	675	9.34%	68	0.94%	5,809	80.38%	7,227
Coffee	16,899	75.87%	5,076	22.79%	300	1.35%	11,823	53.08%	22,275
Colbert	19,203	68.86%	8,343	29.92%	340	1.22%	10,860	38.94%	27,886
Conecuh	3,442	53.44%	2,966	46.05%	33	0.51%	476	7.39%	6,441
Coosa	3,631	66.27%	1,796	32.78%	52	0.95%	1,835	33.49%	5,479
Covington	14,586	83.68%	2,721	15.61%	123	0.71%	11,865	68.07%	17,430
Crenshaw	4,864	73.51%	1,700	25.69%	53	0.80%	3,164	47.82%	6,617
Cullman	36,880	88.12%	4,478	10.70%	493	1.18%	32,402	77.42%	41,851
Dale	14,303	72.46%	5,170	26.19%	265	1.34%	9,133	46.27%	19,738
Dallas	5,524	30.92%	12,230	68.46%	110	0.62%	-6,706	-37.54%	17,864
DeKalb	24,767	84.37%	4,281	14.58%	308	1.05%	20,486	69.78%	29,356
Elmore	30,164	73.52%	10,367	25.27%	499	1.22%	19,797	48.25%	41,030
Escambia	10,869	68.32%	4,918	30.91%	123	0.77%	5,951	37.40%	15,910
Etowah	35,528	74.44%	11,567	24.24%	633	1.33%	23,961	50.20%	47,728
Fayette	7,300	83.28%	1,395	15.91%	71	0.81%	5,905	67.36%	8,766
Franklin	10,376	82.49%	2,086	16.58%	116	0.92%	8,290	65.91%	12,578
Geneva	10,848	86.47%	1,595	12.71%	102	0.81%	9,253	73.76%	12,545
Greene	875	18.32%	3,884	81.34%	16	0.34%	-3,009	-63.02%	4,775
Hale	3,192	40.41%	4,663	59.03%	45	0.57%	-1,471	-18.62%	7,900
Henry	6,607	71.06%	2,606	28.03%	85	0.91%	4,001	43.03%	9,298
Houston	32,618	70.64%	12,917	27.98%	638	1.38%	19,701	42.67%	46,173
Jackson	19,670	83.22%	3,717	15.73%	249	1.05%	15,953	67.49%	23,636
Jefferson	138,843	42.61%	181,688	55.76%	5,317	1.63%	-42,845	-13.15%	325,848
Lamar	6,174	85.83%	978	13.60%	41	0.57%	5,196	72.24%	7,193
Lauderdale	31,721	71.54%	11,915	26.87%	703	1.59%	19,806	44.67%	44,339
Lawrence	12,322	76.86%	3,562	22.22%	147	0.92%	8,760	54.64%	16,031
Lee	42,221	59.09%	27,860	38.99%	1,368	1.91%	14,361	20.10%	71,449
Limestone	34,640	70.36%	13,672	27.77%	923	1.87%	20,968	42.59%	49,235
Lowndes	1,836	26.86%	4,972	72.74%	27	0.40%	-3,136	-45.88%	6,835
Macon	1,541	17.67%	7,108	81.49%	74	0.85%	-5,567	-63.82%	8,723
Madison	102,780	52.77%	87,286	44.82%	4,701	2.41%	15,494	7.96%	194,767
Marengo	5,343	49.02%	5,488	50.35%	69	0.63%	-145	-1.33%	10,900
Marion	12,205	88.40%	1,463	10.60%	139	1.01%	10,742	77.80%	13,807
Marshall	33,191	83.70%	5,943	14.99%	521	1.31%	27,248	68.71%	39,655
Mobile	101,243	55.27%	79,474	43.39%	2,447	1.34%	21,769	11.88%	183,164
Monroe	6,147	57.62%	4,455	41.76%	66	0.62%	1,692	15.86%	10,668
Montgomery	33,311	33.60%	64,529	65.09%	1,299	1.31%	-31,218	-31.49%	99,139
Morgan	39,664	73.83%	13,234	24.63%	824	1.53%	26,430	49.20%	53,722
Perry	1,339	25.60%	3,860	73.80%	31	0.59%	-2,521	-48.20%	5,230
Pickens	5,594	57.86%	4,022	41.60%	52	0.54%	1,572	16.26%	9,668
Pike	8,042	58.10%	5,636	40.72%	163	1.18%	2,406	17.38%	13,841
Randolph	8,559	78.98%	2,203	20.33%	75	0.69%	6,356	58.65%	10,837
Russell	9,864	46.25%	11,228	52.64%	237	1.11%	-1,364	-6.40%	21,329
Shelby	79,700	69.33%	33,268	28.94%	1,982	1.72%	46,432	40.39%	114,950
St. Clair	36,166	81.38%	7,744	17.43%	531	1.19%	28,422	63.95%	44,441
Sumter	1,598	25.40%	4,648	73.88%	45	0.72%	-3,050	-48.48%	6,291
Talladega	22,235	62.35%	13,138	36.84%	290	0.81%	9,097	25.51%	35,663
Tallapoosa	14,963	71.28%	5,859	27.91%	169	0.81%	9,104	43.37%	20,991
Tuscaloosa	51,117	56.69%	37,765	41.88%	1,290	1.43%	13,352	14.81%	90,172
Walker	26,002	83.42%	4,834	15.51%	334	1.07%	21,168	67.91%	31,170
Washington	6,564	73.95%	2,258	25.44%	54	0.61%	4,306	48.51%	8,876
Wilcox	1,833	31.05%	4,048	68.58%	22	0.37%	-2,215	-37.52%	5,903
Winston	10,195	90.35%	974	8.63%	115	1.02%	9,221	81.72%	11,284
Totals	1,441,170	62.03%	849,624	36.57%	32,488	1.40%	591,546	25.46%	2,323,282

==== By congressional district ====
Trump won six of seven congressional districts. Trump's 81.1% in Alabama's 4th district was his best showing of any congressional district in the nation.

District	Trump	Biden	Elected representative
1st	64%	35%	Jerry Carl
2nd	64%	35%	Barry Moore
3rd	65%	33%	Mike Rogers
4th	81%	18%	Robert Aderholt
5th	62%	36%	Mo Brooks
6th	67%	31%	Gary Palmer
7th	28%	71%	Terri Sewell

== Analysis ==
A socially conservative Bible Belt state, Alabama has voted for the Republican presidential candidate in every election starting in 1980, and has done so by double-digit margins in all of them except 1980, 1992, and 1996. Most analysts expected the state to be uncompetitive.

Biden only won Jefferson County and 12 counties in the Black Belt; Trump won all other counties.

This election coincided with the 2020 U.S. Senate election in Alabama, where incumbent Democrat Doug Jones – who was elected by a 21,924 vote margin in a 2017 special election – ran for a full six-year term but was defeated by Republican football coach Tommy Tuberville. Despite losing, Jones outperformed Biden by 5.1 percentage points.

=== Exit polls ===
==== Edison ====
The following are estimates from exit polls conducted by the Edison Research for the National Election Pool (encompassing ABC News, CBS News, CNN, and NBC News) interviewing 1,201 Alabama voters, adjusted to match the actual vote count.

2020 presidential election in Alabama by subgroup (Edison exit polling)
Demographic subgroup	Biden	Trump	% of total vote
Total vote	36.57	62.03	99
Ideology
Liberals	91	8	14
Moderates	54	44	36
Conservatives	8	92	50
Party
Democrats	95	5	26
Republicans	2	97	53
Independents	49	44	21
Gender
Men	35	63	45
Women	39	61	55
Race/ethnicity
White	21	77	74
Black	89	11	22
Hispanic or Latino	–	–	3
Asian	–	–	0
Other	–	–	1
Age
18–29 years old	54	44	15
30–44 years old	40	57	23
45–64 years old	37	62	37
65 and older	23	77	25
Sexual orientation
LGBT	–	–	5
Heterosexual	32	66	95
Education
Never attended college	26	73	20
Some college education	40	60	25
Associate degree	29	70	17
Bachelor's degree	40	57	23
Postgraduate degree	52	47	14
Income
Less than $50,000	35	65	37
$50,000 to $99,999	38	60	31
$100,000 or more	33	67	32
Issue regarded as most important
Racial inequality	93	5	18
Coronavirus	–	–	7
Economy	8	91	49
Crime and safety	–	–	15
Health care	–	–	7
Region
North	29	70	24
North Central	26	72	26
Birmingham/South Central	56	42	28
South	33	66	22
Area type
Urban	58	39	25
Suburban	27	72	56
Rural	37	61	20
Family's financial situation today
Better than four years ago	17	82	60
Worse than four years ago	67	33	11
About the same	64	34	27

==== Associated Press ====
The following are estimates from exit polls conducted by the University of Chicago for the Associated Press interviewing 1,905 likely voters in Alabama, adjusted to match the actual vote count.

2020 presidential election in Alabama by subgroup (Associated Press exit polling)
Demographic subgroup	Biden	Trump	Jorgensen	% of total vote
Total vote	36.57	62.03	1.08	100
Ideology
Liberals	86	13	1	20
Moderates	55	42	2	28
Conservatives	7	92	1	51
Party
Democrats or lean Democrat	96	3	1	33
Republicans or lean Republican	4	94	1	63
Independents	54	40	4	4
Type of vote
Election Day	31	67	1	83
Mail	62	37	1	17
Vote in 2016
Hillary Clinton	97	2	1	27
Donald Trump	3	96	1	53
Someone else	54	30	12	4
Did not vote	41	57	1	16
Gender
Men	32	66	1	46
Women	40	59	1	53
Race/ethnicity
White	20	78	1	75
Black	91	8	1	22
Hispanic or Latino	–	–	–	1
Asian	–	–	–	<1
American Indian, Native American, or Alaska Native	–	–	–	<1
Native Hawaiian or other Pacific Islander	–	–	–	<1
Other	–	–	–	1
Age
18–24 years old	50	45	3	6
25–29 years old	39	59	1	6
30–39 years old	37	60	2	14
40–49 years old	44	55	1	15
50–64 years old	35	64	1	30
65 and older	30	69	<1	29
Religion
Protestant	23	75	1	40
Catholic	40	59	1	7
Mormon	–	–	–	1
Other Christian	35	63	1	26
Jewish	–	–	–	1
Muslim	–	–	–	<1
Something else	56	43	1	11
None	60	38	2	13
White evangelical or white-born again Christian
Yes	12	88	<1	53
No	52	46	1	47
Marital status
Married	31	68	1	52
Not married	48	52	1	48
Sexual orientation
LGBT	–	–	–	9
Heterosexual	35	64	1	91
Education
High school or less	33	66	<1	33
Some college education or associate degree	36	63	1	36
College graduate	39	58	3	20
Postgraduate degree	44	53	1	11
Total household income (2019)
Under $25,000	48	51	1	21
$25,000–$49,999	36	63	1	27
$50,000–$74,999	33	66	<1	18
$75,000–$99,999	30	68	2	14
Over $100,000	32	66	1	19
Union households
Yes	–	–	–	8
No	35	63	2	92
Veteran households
Yes	30	69	<1	32
No	36	62	1	68
Issue regarded as most important
Economy and jobs	9	89	2	32
Healthcare	54	46	<1	9
Immigration	–	–	–	5
Abortion	–	–	–	3
Law enforcement	–	–	–	5
Climate change	–	–	–	1
Foreign policy	–	–	–	1
COVID-19 pandemic	58	40	1	33
Racism	68	29	1	10
Area type
Urban	59	40	<1	13
Suburban	42	55	2	32
Small town	34	64	1	26
Rural	23	77	<1	30

== See also ==
- United States presidential elections in Alabama
- 2020 United States elections
- 2020 United States presidential election
- 2020 Democratic Party presidential primaries
- 2020 Democratic Party presidential debates
- 2020 Democratic Party presidential forums
- Results of the 2020 Democratic Party presidential primaries
- 2020 Republican Party presidential primaries
- 2020 Republican Party presidential debates
- Results of the 2020 Republican Party presidential primaries
- 2020 United States Senate election in Alabama
- 2020 United States House of Representatives elections
- Elections in Alabama

== Notes ==
Partisan clients
