= Chris Woods (gridiron football) =

American gridiron football player (born 1962)

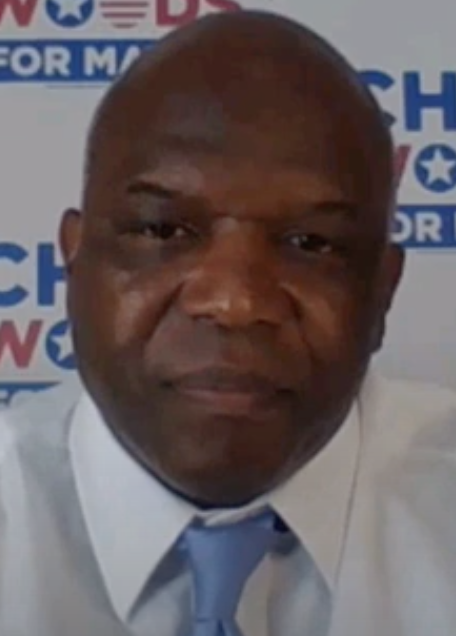
- Woods in 2021

No. 74, 85, 88
- Position: Wide receiver

Personal information
- Born: July 19, 1962 (age 64); Birmingham, Alabama, U.S.
- Listed height: 5 ft 11 in (1.80 m)
- Listed weight: 190 lb (86 kg)

Career information
- High school: A. H. Parker (Birmingham)
- College: Auburn (1980–1983)
- Supplemental draft: 1984: 1st round, 28th overall pick

Career history
- Edmonton Eskimos (1984–1985); Toronto Argonauts (1986); Los Angeles Raiders (1987–1988); Cleveland Browns (1989)*; Denver Broncos (1989)
- * Offseason or practice squad member only
- Stats at Pro Football Reference

Christopher Wyatt Woods (born July 19, 1962) is an American former professional football wide receiver who played three seasons in the National Football League (NFL) with the Los Angeles Raiders and Denver Broncos. He played college football at Auburn University. Woods also played for the Edmonton Eskimos and Toronto Argonauts of the Canadian Football League (CFL).

== Early life and college ==
Christopher Wyatt Woods was born on July 19, 1962, in Birmingham, Alabama. He attended A. H. Parker High School in Birmingham.

Woods was a four-year letterman for the Auburn Tigers of Auburn University from 1980 to 1983. He caught three passes for 26 yards as a freshman in 1980. In 1981, he recorded 13 receptions for 213 yards and one touchdown, seven carries for 72 yards, and 11 punt returns for 60 yards. Wood caught 21 passes for 406 yards and two touchdowns in 1982 and 15 passes for 227 yards and two touchdowns in 1983.

== Professional career ==
Woods signed with the Edmonton Eskimos of the Canadian Football League (CFL) on March 5, 1984. In June 1984, he was selected by the Los Angeles Raiders in the first round, with the 28th overall pick, of the 1984 NFL supplemental draft of USFL and CFL players. During the 1984 CFL season, he totaled 38 receptions for 837 yards and six touchdowns, three carries for 60 yards, 18 kickoff returns for 442 yards, and 31 punt returns for 303 yards and one touchdown. Woods dressed in 13 games in 1985, catching 41 passes for 779 yards and six touchdowns while also returning ten kickoffs for 239 yards and 36 punts for 366 yards.

In May 1986, Wood was traded to the Toronto Argonauts for future considerations. He dressed in 17 games for the Argonauts in 1986, recording 61 receptions for 1,163 yards and six touchdowns, eight kickoff returns for 152 yards, and 64 punt returns for 595 yards. He became a free agent after the 1986 season.

Woods signed with the Los Angeles Raiders on April 17, 1987. He was placed on injured reserve on September 7 and was activated on October 31, 1987. He played in nine games, starting one, for the Raiders during the 1987 season, totaling one catch for 14 yards, 26 punt returns for 189 yards, and three kick returns for 55 yards. Woods played in two games in 1988, returning one kick for 20 yards, before being placed on injured reserve again on September 14, 1988. He became a free agent after the 1988 season.

Woods was signed by the Cleveland Browns on March 28, 1989. He was later released on August 29, 1989.

Woods signed with the Denver Broncos on November 8, 1989. He played in one game for the Broncos, returning one kick for 17 yards and two punts for six yards, before being released on November 14, 1989.

== Personal life ==
Woods was a candidate for mayor of his hometown of Birmingham, Alabama in 1995. He ran again in 2017, finishing third with 18% of the vote behind Randall Woodfin and incumbent William A. Bell. Woods also ran for mayor in the 2021 election, finishing fourth in the voting.

Woods is the president and CEO of C.W. Woods Contracting. His uncle, Abraham Woods, was a civil rights activist.
