= Gregory Cook (judge) =

American judge (born 1962)

Greg Cook

Judge of the United States District Court for the Northern District of Alabama
- Designate
- Assuming office TBD
- Appointed by: Donald Trump
- Succeeding: R. David Proctor

Associate Justice of the Alabama Supreme Court
- Incumbent
- Assumed office January 17, 2023
- Preceded by: Michael F. Bolin

Personal details
- Born: Gregory Carl Cook; 1962 (age 63–64) Travis Air Force Base, California, U.S.
- Party: Republican
- Education: Duke University (BA); Harvard University (JD)

Military service
- Branch/service: United States Air Force
- Rank: Captain

Gregory Carl Cook (born 1962) is an American lawyer from Alabama who is the designate to serve as a United States district judge of the United States District Court for the Northern District of Alabama. He has served as an associate justice of the Alabama Supreme Court since January 2023.

== Early life and education ==
Cook was born on Travis Air Force Base in California. He received a Bachelor of Arts from Duke University, magna cum laude, in 1984, while attending on an Air Force Reserve Officer Training Corps scholarship, and a Juris Doctor from Harvard Law School, magna cum laude, in 1991, where he was an editor on the Harvard Journal of Law and Public Policy.

== Career ==
After graduating law school, Cook moved to Birmingham to practice law. He is also a United States Air Force veteran, reaching the rank of captain. Cook was a partner with the law firm Balch & Bingham for 30 years. In late 2000, Cook served as a volunteer attorney for the Bush v. Gore legal battle in Florida, where he supervised the hand recounting of hanging-chad ballots.

=== Political involvement ===
Cook served on the Jefferson County Republican Steering Committee and the Alabama Republican Party Executive Committee. For 15 years, he served as legal counsel to the Alabama GOP – including four years as general counsel – at both the county and state levels.

=== Alabama Supreme Court ===
In 2021, Cook announced his candidacy for the Republican nomination to a seat on the Supreme Court of Alabama. Cook ran to replace retiring Justice Michael F. Bolin and faced Calhoun County Circuit Court Judge Debra Jones in the primary. Debra Jones was by trial lawyers and Cook was primarily supported by business groups. Cook went on to win the primary with 54.3% of the vote. Cook then won the November 8, 2022, general election, receiving 67.4% of the vote. Cook's investiture ceremony, where he took his oath of office, was held on January 13, 2023. Cook formally took office on January 17, 2023.

=== Nomination to U.S. district court ===
On June 29, 2026, President Donald Trump announced his intention to nominate Cook to an undesignated seat on the United States District Court for the Northern District of Alabama. On September 24, 2026, his nomination was reported from the Judiciary Committee by a 12–10 party-line vote. On November 12, the Senate invoked cloture on his nomination by a 50–27 vote. Later that day, his nomination was confirmed by a 49–27 vote. He is awaiting his judicial commission.

== Personal life ==
Cook has been married to his wife Kimberly B. Cook since 1988. They have three children. He has been a member of Dawson Baptist Church since 1991, where he is an ordained deacon. Cook was also an active adult leader in the Boy Scouts of America prior to taking the bench, receiving the Silver Beaver Award, a Council's highest honor for adult volunteers, in 2021.

== Election results ==
Republican primary for Alabama Supreme Court
Year	Republican	Votes	Pct	Republican	Votes	Pct
2022	Debra Jones	256,227	44.6%	Greg Cook	317,705	55.4%

Supreme Court - Place 5
Year	Democrat	Votes	Pct	Republican	Votes	Pct
2022	Anita Kelly	451,538	32.6%	Greg Cook	931,706	67.4%

Legal offices
Preceded by Michael F. Bolin	Associate Justice of the Alabama Supreme Court; 2023–present	Incumbent
Preceded by R. David Proctor	Judge of the United States District Court for the Northern District of Alabama; Taking office 2026	Designate
