= 2025 Birmingham, Alabama mayoral election =

Local election in Alabama, US

- August 26, 2025
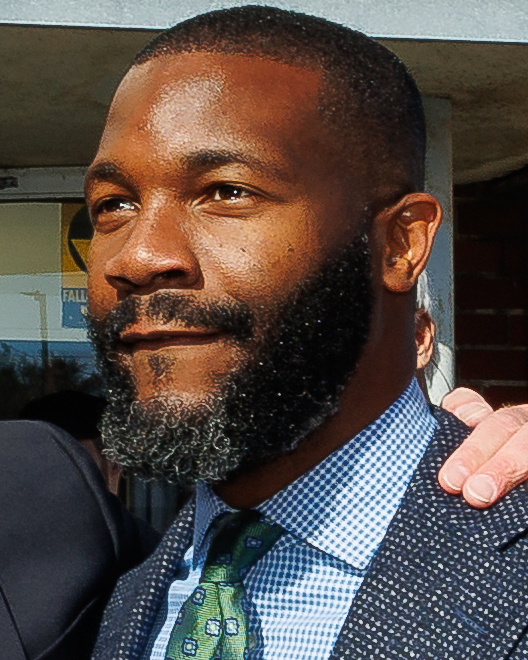

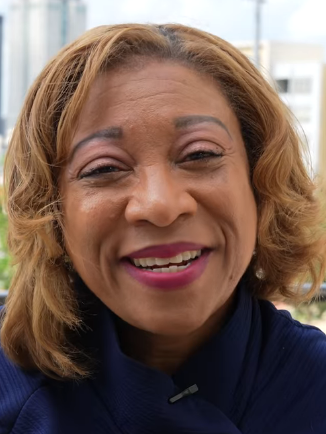
Candidate	Randall Woodfin	Lashunda Scales
Popular vote	24,564	4,781
Percentage	74.9%	14.5%
Mayor before election
Randall Woodfin
Democratic
Elected Mayor
Randall Woodfin
Democratic

The 2025 Birmingham mayoral election was held on August 26, 2025. Municipal elections in Alabama are officially nonpartisan.

Incumbent Democratic mayor Randall Woodfin was re-elected to a third term in office.

== Candidates ==
=== Declared ===
- Kamau Afrika, real estate investor and perennial candidate
- Juandalynn Givan, state representative from the 60th district (2010–present) and candidate for Alabama's 2nd congressional district in 2024
- Marilyn James-Johnson
- Jerimy Littlepage, forklift operator
- Brian Rice, engineer
- David Russell
- Lashunda Scales, Jefferson County commissioner and candidate for mayor in 2021
- Randall Woodfin, incumbent mayor
- Frank Woodson, nonprofit executive

== General election ==
=== Endorsements ===
Randall Woodfin

Federal officials

- Pete Buttigieg, former U.S. Secretary of Transportation (2021–2025)

U.S. senators

- Doug Jones, former U.S. senator from Alabama (2018–2021)

State legislators

- Merika Coleman, state senator from the 19th district (2022–present)

Municipal officials

- Daniel Christiansen, at-large Birmingham Planning Commissioner (2025–present)
- Svante Myrick, former mayor of Ithaca, New York (2012–2022)
- Sheila Tyson, Jefferson County Commissioner from the 2nd district (2018–present) and former Birmingham City Councilor from the 6th district (2013–2018)

Labor unions

- Central Alabama AFL-CIO
- International Brotherhood of Electrical Workers Local 136

Organizations

- Alabama Cannabis Coalition
- Birmingham Association of Realtors
- Black Economic Alliance PAC
- People For the American Way
- Southern Poverty Law Center Action Fund

=== Results ===
2025 Birmingham, Alabama mayoral election
Candidate	Votes	%
Randall Woodfin	24,564	74.87%
Lashunda Scales	4,781	14.57%
Juandalynn Givan	1,396	4.26%
Frank Woodson	999	3.04%
Brian Rice	650	1.98%
Jeremy Littlepage	189	0.58%
Kamau Afrika	106	0.32%
David Russell	71	0.22%
Marilyn James-Johnson	52	0.16%
Total votes	32,808	100.00

== See also ==
- List of mayors of Birmingham, Alabama
