= 2022 Alabama Supreme Court election =

- November 8, 2022

The 2022 Alabama Supreme Court election was held on November 8, 2022, to elect two justices to the Alabama Supreme Court. Primary elections were held on May 24, 2022.

== Place 5 ==
2022 Alabama Supreme Court place five election
- November 8, 2022
Nominee	Greg Cook	Anita Kelly
Party	Republican	Democratic
Popular vote	943,177	454,878
Percentage	67.40%	32.51%
- Cook: 50–60% 60–70% 70–80% 80–90% >90% Kelly: 50–60% 60–70% 70–80%
Justice before election
Mike Bolin
Republican
Elected Justice
Greg Cook
Republican

=== Republican primary ===
Incumbent Justice Mike Bolin chose not to seek re-election.

==== Candidates ====
===== Nominee =====
- Greg Cook, attorney.

===== Eliminated in primary =====
- Debra H. Jones, circuit judge for the Seventh Judicial Circuit of Alabama.

==== Polling ====
Poll source	Date(s) administered	Sample size (Note: Key: A – all adults RV – registered voters LV – likely voters V – unclear)	Margin of error	Greg Cook	Debra Jones	Undecided
Cygnal (R)	March 16–17, 2022	600 (LV)	± 4.0%	11%	7%	82%
Cygnal (R)	May 6–7, 2022	600 (LV)	± 4.0%	29%	14%	56%

==== Results ====
Republican primary
Party	Candidate	Votes	%
Republican	Greg Cook	318,366	55.35
Republican	Debra Jones	256,827	44.65
Total votes		575,193	100.00

=== Democratic primary ===
==== Candidates ====
===== Nominee =====
- Anita Kelly, Montgomery County circuit judge.

=== General election ===
==== Results ====
2022 Alabama Supreme Court place 5 election
Party	Candidate	Votes	%
Republican	Greg Cook	943,177	67.40
Democratic	Anita Kelly	454,878	32.51
Write-in		1,271	0.09
Total votes		1,399,326	100.00
Republican hold			

==== By county ====
County	Greg Cook Republican		Anita Kelly Democratic		Write-in Various		Margin		Total
County	#	%	#	%	#	%	#	%	Total
Autauga	13,445	76.61%	4,085	23.28%	19	0.11%	9,360	53.34%	17,549
Baldwin	59,619	82.33%	12,700	17.54%	99	0.14%	46,919	64.79%	72,418
Barbour	3,752	58.21%	2,691	41.75%	3	0.05%	1,061	16.46%	6,446
Bibb	4,796	82.26%	1,029	17.65%	5	0.09%	3,767	64.61%	5,830
Blount	15,249	92.55%	1,218	7.39%	10	0.06%	14,031	85.16%	16,477
Bullock	775	29.63%	1,840	70.34%	1	0.04%	-1,065	-40.71%	2,616
Butler	3,695	63.78%	2,098	36.22%	0	0.00%	1,597	27.57%	5,793
Calhoun	22,121	74.14%	7,688	25.77%	29	0.10%	14,433	48.37%	29,838
Chambers	5,868	65.19%	3,118	34.64%	15	0.17%	2,750	30.55%	9,001
Cherokee	6,935	89.41%	817	10.53%	4	0.05%	6,118	78.88%	7,756
Chilton	10,619	87.86%	1,457	12.06%	10	0.08%	9,162	75.81%	12,086
Choctaw	3,074	61.19%	1,949	38.79%	1	0.02%	1,125	22.39%	5,024
Clarke	5,238	58.68%	3,686	41.29%	3	0.03%	1,552	17.39%	8,927
Clay	3,615	86.57%	557	13.34%	4	0.10%	3,058	73.23%	4,176
Cleburne	4,190	92.29%	350	7.71%	0	0.00%	3,840	84.58%	4,540
Coffee	11,279	81.51%	2,530	18.28%	28	0.20%	8,749	63.23%	13,837
Colbert	12,693	74.49%	4,333	25.43%	15	0.09%	8,360	49.06%	17,041
Conecuh	2,511	57.25%	1,873	42.70%	2	0.05%	638	14.55%	4,386
Coosa	2,692	71.03%	1,095	28.89%	3	0.08%	1,597	42.14%	3,790
Covington	9,794	87.57%	1,385	12.38%	5	0.04%	8,409	75.19%	11,184
Crenshaw	3,532	79.00%	937	20.96%	2	0.04%	2,595	58.04%	4,471
Cullman	23,691	91.47%	2,187	8.44%	21	0.08%	21,504	83.03%	25,899
Dale	9,379	78.93%	2,487	20.93%	17	0.14%	6,892	58.00%	11,883
Dallas	3,790	33.88%	7,393	66.08%	5	0.04%	-3,603	-32.20%	11,188
DeKalb	15,075	88.93%	1,862	10.98%	15	0.09%	13,213	77.94%	16,952
Elmore	20,411	79.80%	5,144	20.11%	22	0.09%	15,267	59.69%	25,577
Escambia	7,213	75.28%	2,366	24.69%	3	0.03%	4,847	50.58%	9,582
Etowah	20,645	79.78%	5,216	20.16%	18	0.07%	15,429	59.62%	25,879
Fayette	4,744	86.85%	716	13.11%	2	0.04%	4,028	73.75%	5,462
Franklin	6,456	88.11%	865	11.81%	6	0.08%	5,591	76.31%	7,327
Geneva	7,026	89.11%	856	10.86%	3	0.04%	6,170	78.25%	7,885
Greene	585	19.89%	2,352	79.97%	4	0.14%	-1,767	-60.08%	2,941
Hale	2,248	44.10%	2,842	55.75%	8	0.16%	-594	-11.65%	5,098
Henry	4,935	74.93%	1,646	24.99%	5	0.08%	3,289	49.94%	6,586
Houston	21,039	76.93%	6,282	22.97%	27	0.10%	14,757	53.96%	27,348
Jackson	11,510	87.13%	1,686	12.76%	14	0.11%	9,824	74.37%	13,210
Jefferson	92,780	47.43%	102,694	52.50%	132	0.07%	-9,914	-5.07%	195,606
Lamar	3,895	89.62%	448	10.31%	3	0.07%	3,447	79.31%	4,346
Lauderdale	19,884	77.76%	5,668	22.17%	19	0.07%	14,216	55.59%	25,571
Lawrence	8,467	80.47%	2,045	19.44%	10	0.10%	6,422	61.03%	10,522
Lee	26,819	66.93%	13,222	33.00%	27	0.07%	13,597	33.93%	40,068
Limestone	23,462	75.95%	7,408	23.98%	23	0.07%	16,054	51.97%	30,893
Lowndes	1,269	31.80%	2,714	68.00%	8	0.20%	-1,445	-36.21%	3,991
Macon	1,117	20.95%	4,211	78.99%	3	0.06%	-3,094	-58.04%	5,331
Madison	70,052	58.99%	48,593	40.92%	105	0.09%	21,459	18.07%	118,750
Marengo	3,734	52.00%	3,444	47.96%	3	0.04%	290	4.04%	7,181
Marion	7,645	92.06%	656	7.90%	3	0.04%	6,989	84.16%	8,304
Marshall	21,174	88.44%	2,760	11.53%	9	0.04%	18,414	76.91%	23,943
Mobile	63,706	60.05%	42,268	39.84%	113	0.11%	21,438	20.21%	106,087
Monroe	4,233	60.64%	2,745	39.32%	3	0.04%	1,488	21.31%	6,981
Montgomery	22,456	39.27%	34,614	60.53%	114	0.20%	-12,158	-21.26%	57,184
Morgan	25,497	80.22%	6,257	19.69%	28	0.09%	19,240	60.54%	31,782
Perry	876	27.80%	2,273	72.14%	2	0.06%	-1,397	-44.34%	3,151
Pickens	4,175	64.25%	2,322	35.73%	1	0.02%	1,853	28.52%	6,498
Pike	5,217	64.73%	2,838	35.21%	5	0.06%	2,379	29.52%	8,060
Randolph	5,481	84.09%	1,036	15.89%	1	0.02%	4,445	68.20%	6,518
Russell	5,953	51.95%	5,492	47.92%	15	0.13%	461	4.02%	11,460
Shelby	52,098	75.24%	17,039	24.61%	102	0.15%	35,059	50.63%	69,239
St. Clair	23,522	84.89%	4,156	15.00%	31	0.11%	19,366	69.89%	27,709
Sumter	1,123	29.26%	2,714	70.71%	1	0.03%	-1,591	-41.45%	3,838
Talladega	14,369	66.81%	7,128	33.14%	11	0.05%	7,241	33.67%	21,508
Tallapoosa	10,395	77.16%	3,070	22.79%	7	0.05%	7,325	54.37%	13,472
Tuscaloosa	31,867	62.27%	19,259	37.63%	48	0.09%	12,608	24.64%	51,174
Walker	15,480	87.40%	2,226	12.57%	5	0.03%	13,254	74.83%	17,711
Washington	4,476	76.88%	1,343	23.07%	3	0.05%	3,133	53.81%	5,822
Wilcox	1,311	34.84%	2,450	65.11%	2	0.05%	-1,139	-30.27%	3,763
Winston	6,405	93.37%	449	6.55%	6	0.09%	5,956	86.82%	6,860
Totals	943,177	67.40%	454,878	32.51%	1,271	0.09%	488,299	34.90%	1,399,326

==== By congressional district ====
Cook won six of seven congressional districts.

District	Cook	Kelly	Representative
1st	69%	31%	Jerry Carl
2nd	70%	30%	Barry Moore
3rd	72%	28%	Mike Rogers
4th	85%	15%	Robert Aderholt
5th	68%	32%	Mo Brooks (117th Congress)
5th	68%	32%	Dale Strong (118th Congress)
6th	70%	30%	Gary Palmer
7th	37%	63%	Terri Sewell

== Place 6 ==
=== Republican primary ===
==== Candidates ====
===== Nominee =====
- Kelli Wise, incumbent justice

=== General election ===
==== Results ====
2022 Alabama Supreme Court election, Place 6
Party	Candidate	Votes	%
Republican	Kelli Wise (incumbent)	998,043	97.51
Write-in		25,490	2.49
Total votes		1,023,533	100.00
