= 2018 Jefferson County, Alabama Commission election =

Alabama local election

2018 Jefferson County Commission election
- November 6, 2018

All 5 seats up for election
	Majority party	Minority party
Party	Republican	Democratic
Seats before	3	2
Seats after	3	2
Seat change	Steady	Steady
Popular vote	106,524	99,654
Percentage	50.7%	47.4%

The 2018 Jefferson County Commission election was held on November 6, 2018, to elect all members to the Jefferson County, Alabama Commission. Primary elections were held on June 5, 2018.

== District 1 ==
=== Democratic primary ===
==== Nominee ====
- Lashunda Scales, Birmingham city councilor

==== Eliminated in runoff ====
- George Bowman, incumbent commissioner

==== Eliminated in primary ====
- Eric Major, former state representative
- Gary Richardson, mayor of Midfield

==== Results ====
Democratic primary
Party	Candidate	Votes	%
Democratic	Lashunda Scales	8,452	42.29
Democratic	George F. Bowman Sr. (incumbent)	4,971	24.87
Democratic	Gary Richardson	3,683	18.43
Democratic	Eric Major	2,879	14.41
Total votes		20,085	100.00

==== Runoff ====
===== Results =====
Democratic primary runoff
Party	Candidate	Votes	%
Democratic	Lashunda Scales	6,826	59.41
Democratic	George F. Bowman Sr. (incumbent)	4,664	40.59
Total votes		11,490	100.00

=== General election ===
==== Results ====
2018 Jefferson County Commission election, District 1
Party	Candidate	Votes	%
Democratic	Lashunda Scales	40,513	98.7
Write-in		534	1.3
Total votes		41,047	100.00

== District 2 ==
=== Democratic primary ===
==== Candidates ====
===== Nominee =====
- Sheila Tyson, Birmingham city councilor

===== Eliminated in runoff =====
- Sandra Little Brown, incumbent commissioner

===== Eliminated in primary =====
- Richard Dickerson

==== Results ====
Alabama Democratic primary
Party	Candidate	Votes	%
Democratic	Sandra Little Brown (incumbent)	9,246	46.51
Democratic	Sheila Tyson	9,188	46.22
Democratic	Richard A. Dickerson	1,444	7.26
Total votes		19,878	100.00

==== Runoff ====
===== Results =====
Democratic primary runoff
Party	Candidate	Votes	%
Democratic	Sheila Tyson	6,274	52.58
Democratic	Sandra Little Brown (incumbent)	5,659	47.42
Total votes		11,933	100.00

=== General election ===
==== Results ====
2018 Jefferson County Commission election, District 2
Party	Candidate	Votes	%
Democratic	Sheila Tyson	40,344	99.1
Write-in		386	0.9
Total votes		40,730	100.00

== District 3 ==
=== Republican primary ===
==== Candidates ====
===== Nominee =====
- Jimmie Stephens, incumbent commissioner

===== Eliminated in primary =====
- Rodney Watson

==== Results ====
Republican primary
Party	Candidate	Votes	%
Republican	Jimmie Stephens (incumbent)	10,656	80.51
Republican	Rodney Watson	2,579	19.49
Total votes		23,235	100.00

=== General election ===
==== Results ====
2018 Jefferson County Commission election, District 3
Party	Candidate	Votes	%
Republican	Jimmie Stephens	36,800	95.8
Write-in		1,614	4.2
Total votes		38,414	100.00

== District 4 ==
=== Republican primary ===
==== Candidates ====
===== Nominee =====
- Joe Knight, incumbent commissioner

=== Democratic primary ===
==== Candidates ====
===== Nominee =====
- J. T. Smallwood

=== General election ===
==== Results ====
2018 Jefferson County Commission election, District 4
Party	Candidate	Votes	%
Republican	Joe Knight (incumbent)	31,020	62.2
Democratic	J.T. Smallwood	18,797	37.7
Write-in		15	0.0
Total votes		49,832	100.00

== District 5 ==
=== Republican primary ===
==== Candidates ====
===== Nominee =====
- Steve Ammons, former Vestavia Hills city councilor

===== Eliminated in primary =====
- Jack Williams, state representative

==== Results ====
Republican primary
Party	Candidate	Votes	%
Republican	Steve Ammons	7,980	62.23
Republican	Jack Williams	4,843	37.77
Total votes		12,823	100.00

=== General election ===
==== Results ====
2018 Jefferson County Commission election, District 5
Party	Candidate	Votes	%
Republican	Steve Ammons	38,704	96.4
Write-in		1,456	3.6
Total votes		40,160	100.00
