= 2017 Birmingham, Alabama, mayoral election =

2017 Birmingham, Alabama mayoral election
- October 3, 2017
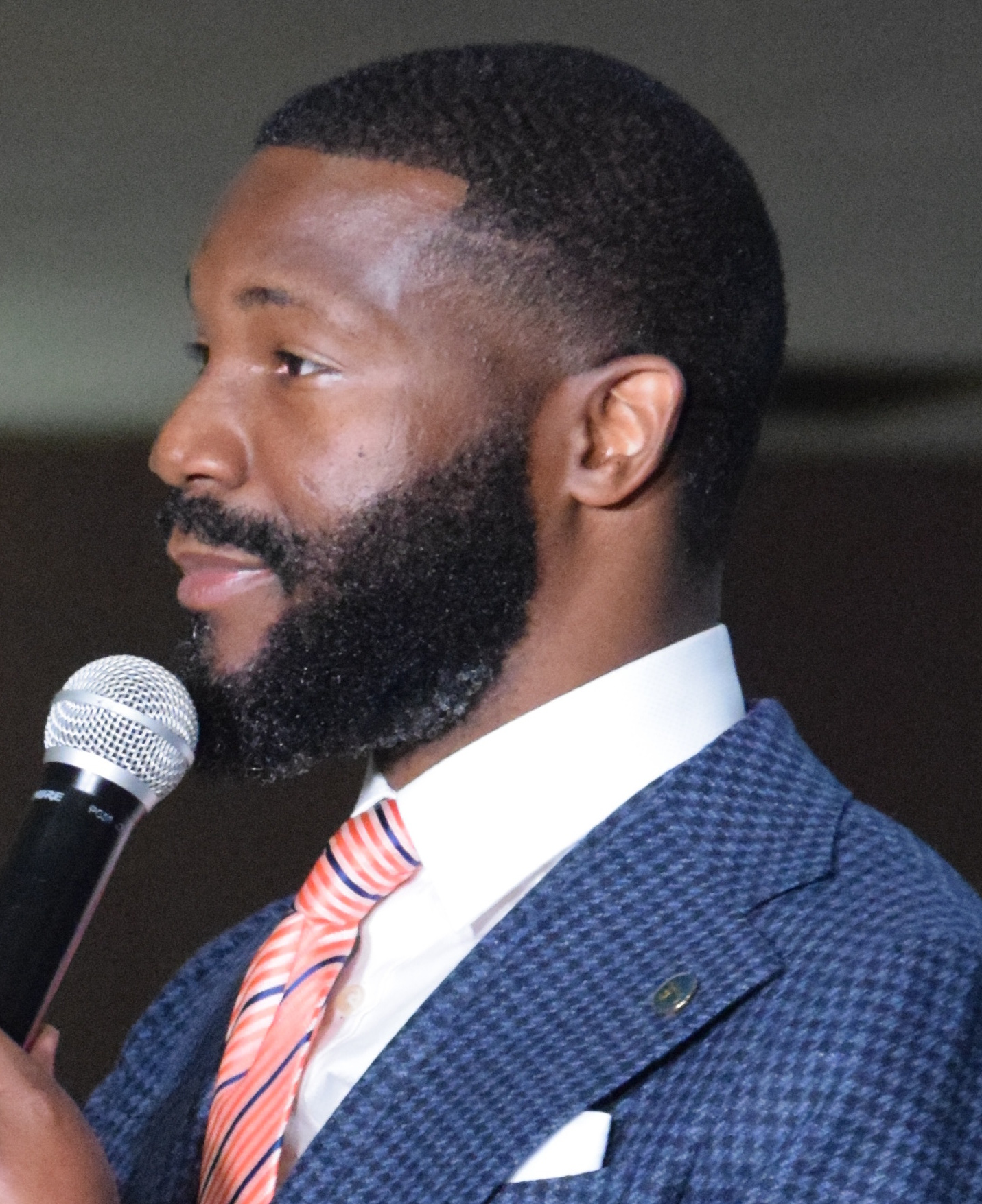

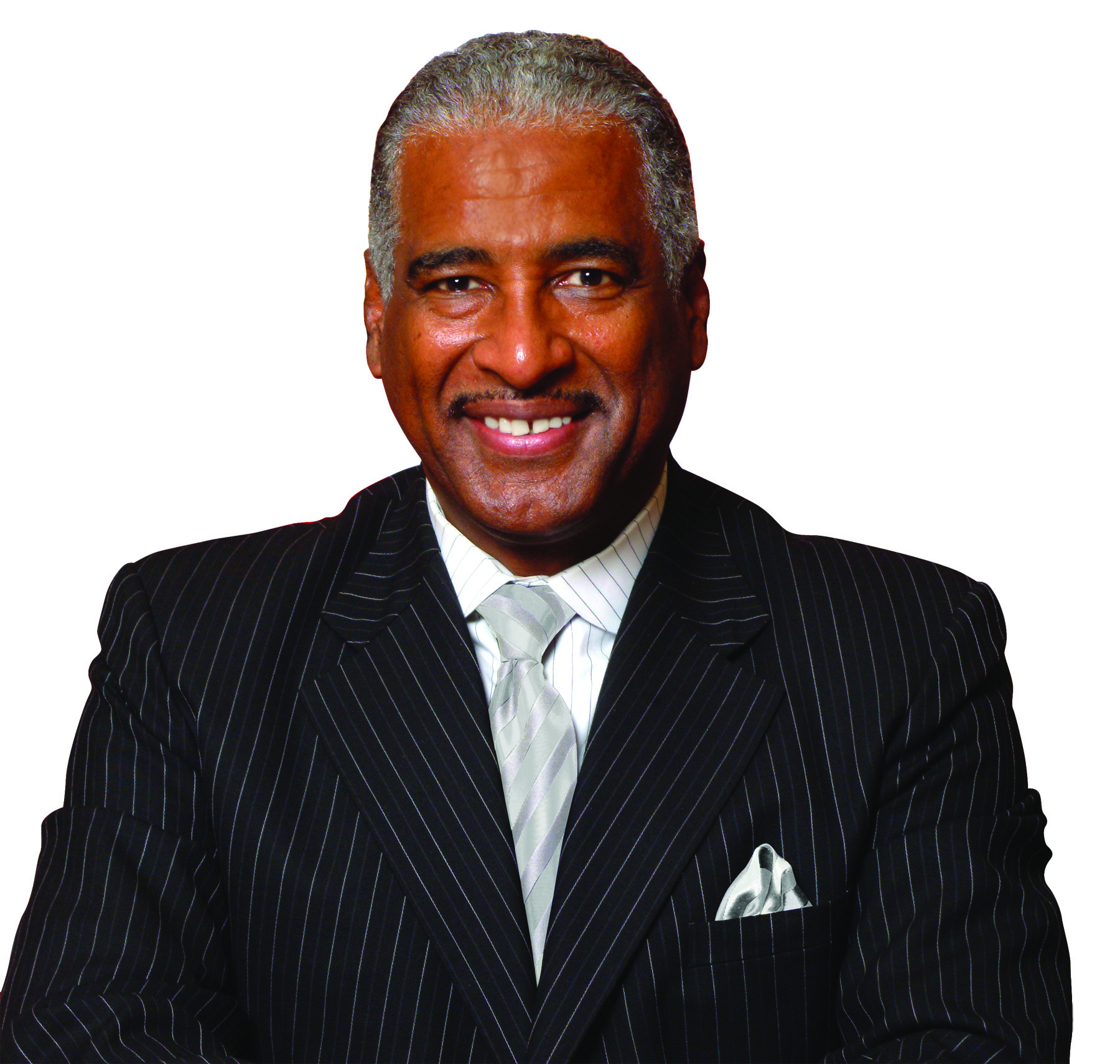

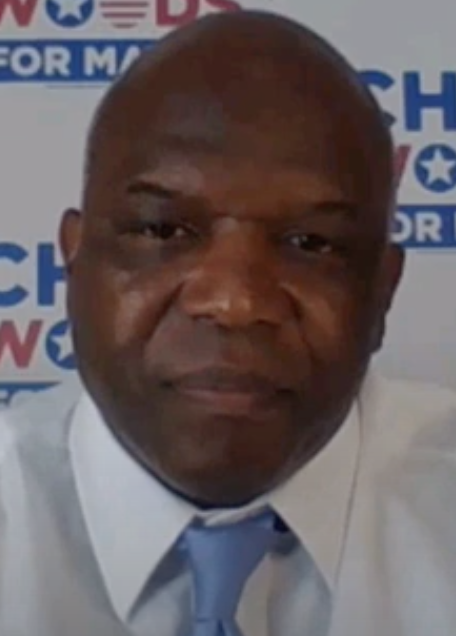
Candidate	Randall Woodfin	William A. Bell	Chris Woods
Party	Democratic	Democratic	Democratic
First round	15,668; 40.85%	14,025; 36.55%	6,961; 18.14%
Second round	24,922; 58.95%	17,357; 41.05%	Eliminated
Mayor before election
William A. Bell
Democratic
Elected Mayor
Randall Woodfin
Democratic

The 2017 mayoral election in Birmingham, Alabama, took place on August 22, 2017, alongside municipal races for the Birmingham City Council and Birmingham Board of Education. In a field of twelve candidates, Randall Woodfin came in first ahead of incumbent William A. Bell. As neither reached the 50 percent threshold, a runoff election was held on October 3, 2017, when Woodfin was elected with over 58 percent of the vote.

== Results ==
Runoff mayoral election, October 3, 2017
Party	Candidate	Votes	%
Democratic	Randall Woodfin	24,922	58.95
Democratic	William A. Bell (incumbent)	17,357	41.05
Total votes		42,279	100.00

General mayoral election, August 22, 2017
Party	Candidate	Votes	%
Democratic	Randall Woodfin	15,668	40.84
Democratic	William A. Bell (incumbent)	14,025	36.55
Democratic	Chris Woods	6,961	18.14
Democratic	Frank Matthews	532	1.39
Democratic	Patricia Bell	264	0.69
Democratic	Randy Davis	256	0.67
Democratic	E. Philemon Hill	205	0.53
Democratic	Fernandez Sims	170	0.44
Democratic	Trudy Hunter	165	0.43
Democratic	Carl Jackson	50	0.13
Democratic	Lanny Jackson	41	0.11
Democratic	Donald Lomax	29	0.08
Total votes		38,366	100.00
