= Jimmie Stephens =

American politician

President of the Jefferson County Commission
- Incumbent
- Assumed office November 12, 2014
- Preceded by: David Carrington

Member of the Jefferson County Commission from the 3rd district
- Incumbent
- Assumed office November 10, 2010
- Preceded by: Bobby Humphryes

Personal details
- Born: April 11, 1951 (age 75) Bessemer, Alabama
- Party: Republican
- Education: Samford University

James A. Stephens (born March 17, 1951) is an American politician who has served on the Jefferson County, Alabama, Commission since 2010. He is a member of the Alabama Republican Party.

== Early life and education ==
Stephens grew up near Bessemer, Alabama, and attended Bessemer High School. He graduated from Samford University in 1975 with a Bachelor of Science in Business Administration and a Master of Business Administration.

== Political career ==
Stephens served on the Bessemer City Council from 2006 to 2010.

=== Jefferson County Commission ===
Stephens first ran for a seat on the Jefferson County Commission in 2010 against incumbent Republican commissioner Bobby Humphryes. He defeated Humphryes in the Republican primary runoff election. In November, he won the general election with 68% of the vote. After winning re-election in 2014, he was elected as the president of the county commission unanimously. He was then re-elected in 2018 and 2022.

In January 2025, he announced that he would again run for re-election in the 2026 election.

== Personal life ==
Stephens announced in December 2024 that he was diagnosed with cancer. He completed treatment in June 2025.
