= Birmingham Times =

Newspaper in Birmingham, Alabama

The Birmingham Times
- front page of BT, August 15, 2020
- Type: Weekly newspaper
- Publisher: Samuel Martin
- Editor: Barnett Wright
- Founded: 1964
- Headquarters: 115 3rd Avenue West Birmingham, Alabama
- Website: birminghamtimes.com

The Birmingham Times is a weekly African-American newspaper published in Birmingham, Alabama.

== History ==
The newspaper was founded in 1964 by Jesse Lewis Sr. in order to give the local Black community a greater voice during the civil rights struggle. Lewis wanted to provide an alternative to the News and Post-Herald, which only mentioned Black people in a negative light, and the Birmingham World, which Lewis felt only focused on discrimination. The paper did not own its own printing press and sometimes struggled with getting their printer to print the paper because of its anti-segregation stance. Lewis stated that he wanted the Times to be "committed to covering the fullness and totality of life, not just the controversial and political."

The paper was sold to Lewis's son James in 1998 with Cheryl Eldridge staying on as the editor in chief. In 2019 the paper was sold to The Foundation for Progress in Journalism (FPJ), a non-profit created honoring Lewis, with the aim to promote minorities advancement in journalism.
