= Sheila Tyson =

American politician

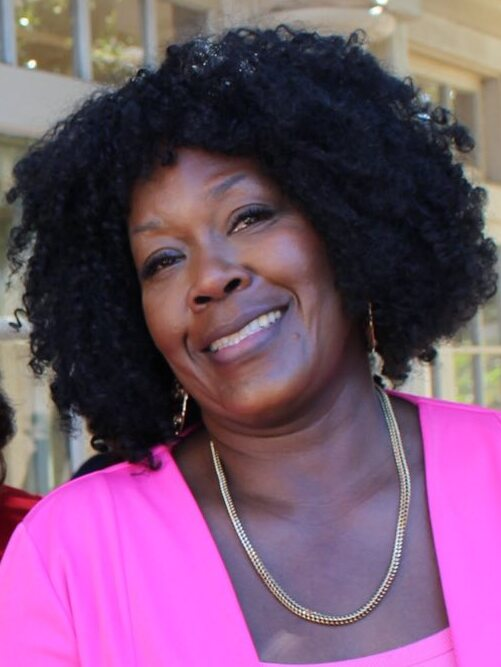
- Tyson in 2025

Member of the Jefferson County Commission from the 2nd district
- Incumbent
- Assumed office November 13, 2018
- Preceded by: Sandra Little Brown

Personal details
- Born: April 8, 1961 (age 64)
- Party: Democratic

Sheila Tyson (born March 8, 1961) is an American politician who has served on the Jefferson County, Alabama, Commission since 2018. She is a member of the Alabama Democratic Party

== Political career ==
=== Birmingham City Council ===
Tyson was first elected to the Birmingham City Council as a representative for district six and began her term in 2008. She left office in 2018 after her election to the Jefferson County Commission.

=== Jefferson County Commission ===
Tyson first announced that she was running for the Jefferson County Commission in 2018. She ran against incumbent commissioner Sandra Little Brown in the Democratic primary. On June 5, she advanced to a primary runoff election after no candidate received a majority of the vote. On July 17, she defeated Brown with 52% of the vote, becoming the Democratic nominee. She won the general election unopposed.

She spoke on the importance of all individuals participating in the 2020 United States census.

After state representative Juandalynn Givan blamed mayor Randall Woodfin and Birmingham police for rising crime, Tyson responded by stating, "police do not stop folks from killing from each other!"

=== 2024 U.S. House campaign ===
In October 2023, Tyson announced her campaign to represent Alabama's 2nd congressional district in the United States House of Representatives. She did not appear on the primary election ballot.

== Political positions ==
Tyson criticized the Birmingham Water Works board in 2024, stating that they failed to adequately answer questions from the public when considering a rate hike.

=== Endorsements ===
She supported Randall Woodfin in his re-election to a third term as mayor of Birmingham in 2025.
