= Lashunda Scales =

American politician (born 1971)

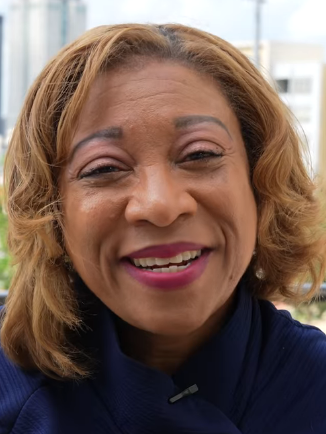
- Scales in 2025

Member of the Jefferson County Commission from the 1st district
- Incumbent
- Assumed office November 13, 2018
- Preceded by: George Bowman

Member of the Birmingham City Council from the 1st district
- In office 2009 – November 13, 2018

Personal details
- Born: February 17, 1971 (age 55)
- Party: Democratic
- Education: Stillman College; Jefferson State Community College

Lashunda Scales (born February 17, 1971) is an American politician who has served on the Jefferson County, Alabama, Commission since 2018. A member of the Alabama Democratic Party, she previously served on the Birmingham City Council from 2009 to 2018. She unsuccessfully ran for mayor of Birmingham in 2021 and 2025.

== Education ==
Scales attended Stillman College, where she received an Honorary Doctorate of Humane Letters. She also attended Jefferson State Community College, where she received an associate degree in applied science.

== Career ==
=== Birmingham City Council ===
Scales first ran for city council in 2009, against incumbent Joel Montgomery. She went on to defeat Montgomery in the election. In 2013, she was charged with two felony indictments and six counts of using her position for personal gain and voter intimidation. The charges came from a 2011 ethics complaint by a former business associate. She agreed to a plea deal, and was placed on probation.

In 2014, she demanded that the Railroad Park Foundation director resign following an argument. She resigned her position in 2018 after being elected to the Jefferson County Commission.

=== Jefferson County Commission ===
Scales defeated incumbent commissioner George Bowman in a primary runoff election in July 2018. She faced no opposition in the November general election. In 2023, she voted to extend the county's support for the Magic City Classic for another year, though she had hoped to pass a three-year extension.

=== Mayoral campaigns ===
Scales launched her first campaign for mayor of Birmingham in January 2021. She was defeated by incumbent mayor Randall Woodfin on August 24, finishing in second place and receiving 20% of the vote.

She launched her second campaign in May 2025, stating that "help is on the way." She was again defeated by Woodfin on August 26, finishing in second place and receiving 14% of the vote. She conceded the race, but expressed concerns with the voting machines in her concession speech.
