= Abraham Woods =

American civil rights leader

Abraham Lincoln Woods Jr. (October 7, 1928 – November 7, 2008) was an American civil rights leader, who helped coordinate the 1963 March on Washington for Jobs and Freedom and stood behind Martin Luther King Jr. during his historic "I Have a Dream" speech.

== Early life ==
Woods was born on October 7, 1928, in Birmingham, Alabama. He was one of 11 children born to his parents, Rev. Abraham Woods Sr. and the former Maggie Wallace. He attended Morehouse College with Martin Luther King Jr., and later received a Bachelor of Theology at Birmingham Baptist College, a bachelor's degree in sociology at Miles College and a master's degree from the University of Alabama in American history.

== Civil rights movement ==
Woods had been pastor of the First Metropolitan Baptist Church in the early 1960s and led the St. Joseph Baptist Church starting in 1967 as its pastor.

In addition to his service as the president of the Birmingham chapter of the Southern Christian Leadership Conference, Woods would often lead community marches to protest community violence, police shootings and slumlords. Woods was one of the coordinators of the 1963 March on Washington for Jobs and Freedom and stood behind Martin Luther King Jr. during his "I Have a Dream" speech on August 28, delivered to a crowd of 250,000 from the steps of the Lincoln Memorial.

Little more than two weeks after Dr. King's speech, Woods was at the site of the 16th Street Baptist Church bombing minutes after the explosion resulted in the deaths of four girls. "They found shoes. Finally they found bodies. You could smell the human flesh", he told The New York Times. While Ku Klux Klan member Robert Chambliss had been convicted in 1977, a new investigation spurred by Rev. Woods' efforts led to the conviction of Thomas Blanton and Bobby Frank Cherry, two other Klan members, who were found guilty by state juries of all four murders and sentenced to life in prison.

== Later life ==
Woods helped bring attention to the issue of segregation at country clubs, staging protests that the 1990 PGA Championship, one of professional golf's four major tournaments, was going to be played at the Shoal Creek Golf and Country Club near Birmingham, which at the time had no black members. The PGA considered moving the tournament to a new site but reached a compromise with the club in which a local insurance executive was invited to become an honorary member with full membership privileges. The PGA and USGA changed rules regarding course selection, requiring clubs that hosted events to meet inclusive membership requirements.

In 1997, Woods had been invited to a Promise Keepers luncheon that had been extended to him by a white Federal Bureau of Investigation agent, but was reluctant to attend as he perceived it to be "a white male organization". He attended despite his misgivings and was impressed by the number of the organization's top officers who were black.

Introducing himself at a 2004 news conference staged to protest an unjust police shooting, Woods stated that he had "sometimes been called a troublemaker in the city of Birmingham, an agitator," but turned the word around by noting that he didn't resent the title of "agitator" because he could recall that "the little old lady said if a washing machine didn't have an agitator, then it wouldn't get the clothes clean."

Woods died at age 80 on November 7, 2008, at Princeton Baptist Medical Center in Birmingham, having battled cancer for several years.

He is buried in Elmwood Cemetery and Mausoleum.
