= Joe Knight (politician) =

American politician

Member of the Jefferson County Commission from the 4th district
- Incumbent
- Assumed office November 10, 2010
- Preceded by: Betye Collins

Personal details
- Born: October 27, 1954 (age 71)
- Party: Republican
- Education: Mississippi Gulf Coast Community College; University of Southern Mississippi; University of Alabama at Birmingham (BS); Birmingham School of Law (JD)

Joe Knight (born October 27, 1954) is an American politician who has served on the Jefferson County, Alabama, Commission since 2010. He is a member of the Alabama Republican Party.

== Early life and education ==
Knight was born in Miami, Florida, before moving to Pascagoula, Mississippi, and attending Pascagoula High School. For college, he attended the Mississippi Gulf Coast Community College, the University of Southern Mississippi, the University of Alabama at Birmingham, and the Birmingham School of Law.

== Career ==
=== Jefferson County Commission ===
==== Elections ====
Knight first ran for county commission in 2010, announcing his bid in February. Knight finished first in the Republican primary election on June 1, and advanced to a runoff election against businessman Ronnie Dixon. Knight was endorsed by all three candidates eliminated in the first round ahead of his runoff election. He won the runoff election and easily won the general election on November 2. He defeated Libertarian nominee Ron Bishop in 2014.

In 2018, Knight ran against J.T. Smallwood, the county tax collector. He defeated Smallwood with 62% of the vote in November.

==== Tenure ====
In 2011, Knight announced plans to form an advisory panel on stormwater. He held a meeting with three mayors from the county and various environmental group representatives. When the county considered declaring bankruptcy, Knight said that he did not believe it could. He was concerned with the lack of prior precedent and advised that funds should be cut elsewhere.

He spoke in September 2024 about the Northern Beltline, a project that would complete the bypass interstate around Birmingham. He said that he has heard the criticism, but dismissed it.
