= Mike Bolin =

American judge (born 1948)

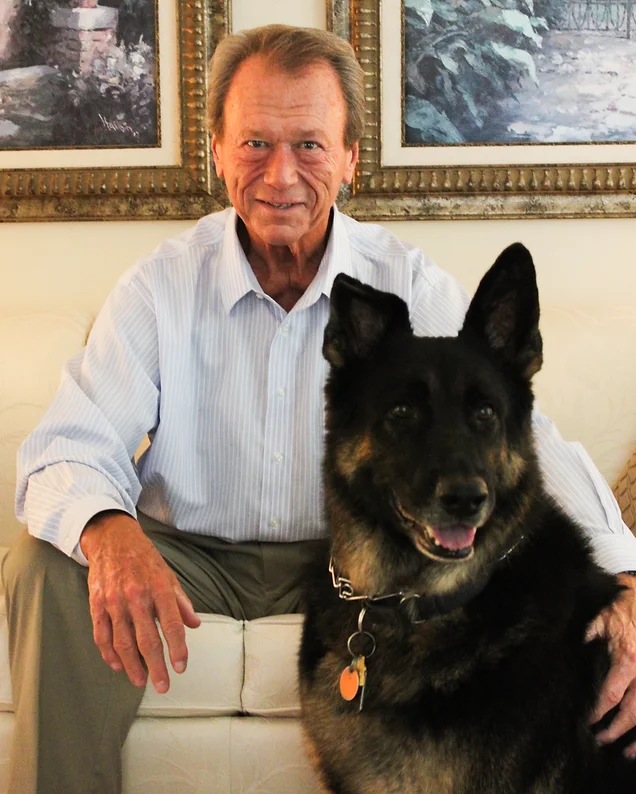
- Bolin in 2023

Member of the Jefferson County Commission from the 5th district
- Incumbent
- Assumed office July 31, 2023
- Preceded by: Steve Ammons

Associate Justice of the Supreme Court of Alabama Place 1
- In office January 14, 2005 – January 13, 2023
- Preceded by: Douglas I. Johnstone
- Succeeded by: Greg Cook

Judge of the Jefferson County Probate Court
- In office 1988–2005
- Preceded by: George R. Reynolds
- Succeeded by: Mark L. Gaines
- Constituency: Place 1 (1988-2000); Place 2 (2000-2005)

Personal details
- Born: Michael Franklyn Bolin; October 1, 1948 (age 78) Birmingham, Alabama
- Education: Samford University (BS, JD)
- Website: Office website

Michael Franklyn Bolin (born October 1, 1948) is an American lawyer and jurist from Alabama. He served as an associate justice of the Alabama Supreme Court from 2005 to 2023.

== Early life and education ==
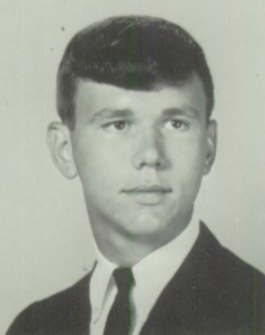
Bolin in 1966.

Bolin was born in Jefferson County, Alabama in 1948. He attended elementary school in Birmingham, being accepted into the first magnet school for scholastic achievement. He then attended Homewood Junior High School.

== Career ==
Bolin was a practicing attorney in Birmingham from 1973 through 1988, when he was elected as Probate Judge of Jefferson County. He was re-elected to that position in 1994 and 2000. He served in that position until his election to the Alabama Supreme Court in 2004, and began serving as an associate justice beginning January 14, 2005.
