= Randall Woodfin =

American lawyer and politician (born 1981)

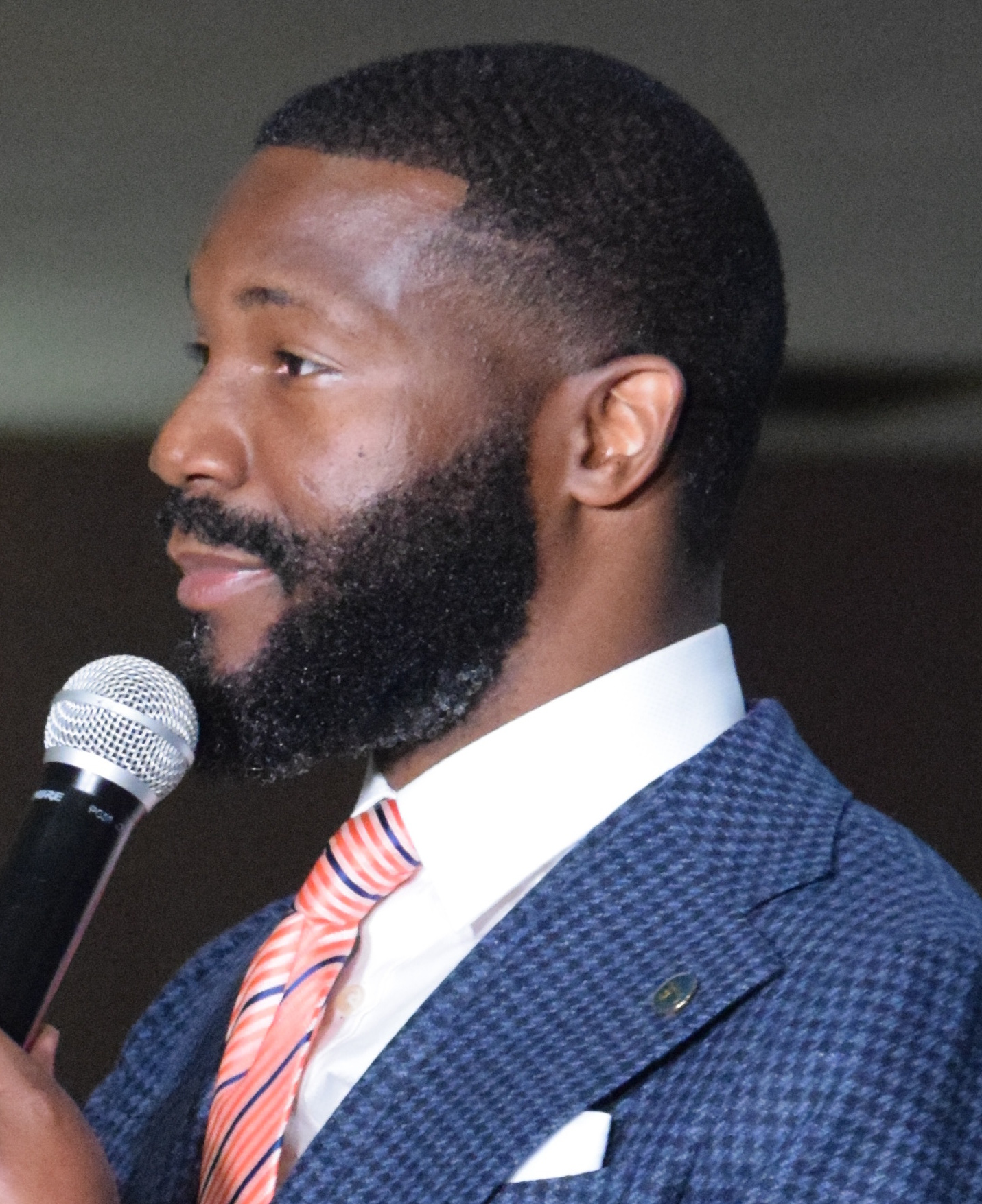
- Woodfin in 2019

34th Mayor of Birmingham, Alabama
- Incumbent
- Assumed office November 28, 2017
- Preceded by: William A. Bell

Personal details
- Born: May 29, 1981 (age 45) Birmingham, Alabama, U.S.
- Party: Democratic
- Education: Morehouse College (BA); Samford University (JD)
- Website: Campaign website

Randall Woodfin (born May 29, 1981) is an American lawyer and politician who has served as the 34th and current Mayor of Birmingham, Alabama since 2017. He won the October 3, 2017, runoff election against incumbent William A. Bell.

He previously served as president of the Birmingham City School Board (2013–2015) and as a city attorney for Birmingham from 2009 to 2017.

== Early life and education ==
Woodfin was born and raised in the North Birmingham and Crestwood neighborhoods of Birmingham, Alabama. He attended North Birmingham Elementary School, Putnam Middle School, and Shades Valley High School.

He graduated from Morehouse College, where he majored in political science and served as student government association president.

Woodfin earned a Juris Doctor from the Cumberland School of Law at Samford University.

== Career ==
=== Early career ===
Between college and law school, Woodfin worked for the Birmingham City Council, the Mayor's Office Division of Youth Services, and the Jefferson County Committee on Economic Opportunity.

He ran unsuccessfully for the Birmingham Board of Education's District 3 seat in 2009, finishing third in a four-person race.

In 2009, Woodfin became an assistant city attorney for Birmingham, a position he held until his election as mayor in 2017.

In 2013, he was elected to the Birmingham Board of Education and was appointed board president shortly after taking office. He served as president until 2015 and remained on the board until 2017.

He has served on several community boards, including the Alabama Campaign to Prevent Teen Pregnancy, Birmingham Botanical Gardens, and the Hispanic Interest Coalition of Alabama. He is a former board member of Birmingham Change Fund, the American Red Cross, Birmingham Education Foundation, Birmingham Cultural Alliance, S.T.A.I.R., and served as president of the Birmingham chapter of the Morehouse College Alumni Association. He is a graduate of Leadership Birmingham (2014) and Leadership Alabama (2016), and was a speaker at TEDx Birmingham 2017.

Woodfin served as Alabama state director for Hillary Clinton’s 2016 presidential campaign.

=== 2017 mayoral campaign ===
Woodfin announced his candidacy for mayor of Birmingham in August 2016, challenging incumbent William Bell alongside 10 other candidates.

In the 2017 general election, held on August 22, Woodfin won 40% of the vote, triggering a runoff with Bell, who placed second. Woodfin won the October 3 runoff with 58.95% of the vote, becoming the city’s youngest mayor in over 120 years.

During the campaign, Woodfin criticized Bell’s record on improving residents’ quality of life and pledged to focus on revitalizing Birmingham’s neighborhoods. Bell criticized Woodfin’s fundraising, including out-of-state donations, which Woodfin defended as necessary to compete with the incumbent’s donor base.

Woodfin received support from Vermont Senator Bernie Sanders, who recorded a robocall endorsing him, and from representatives of Our Revolution, who campaigned in Birmingham.

=== As mayor ===
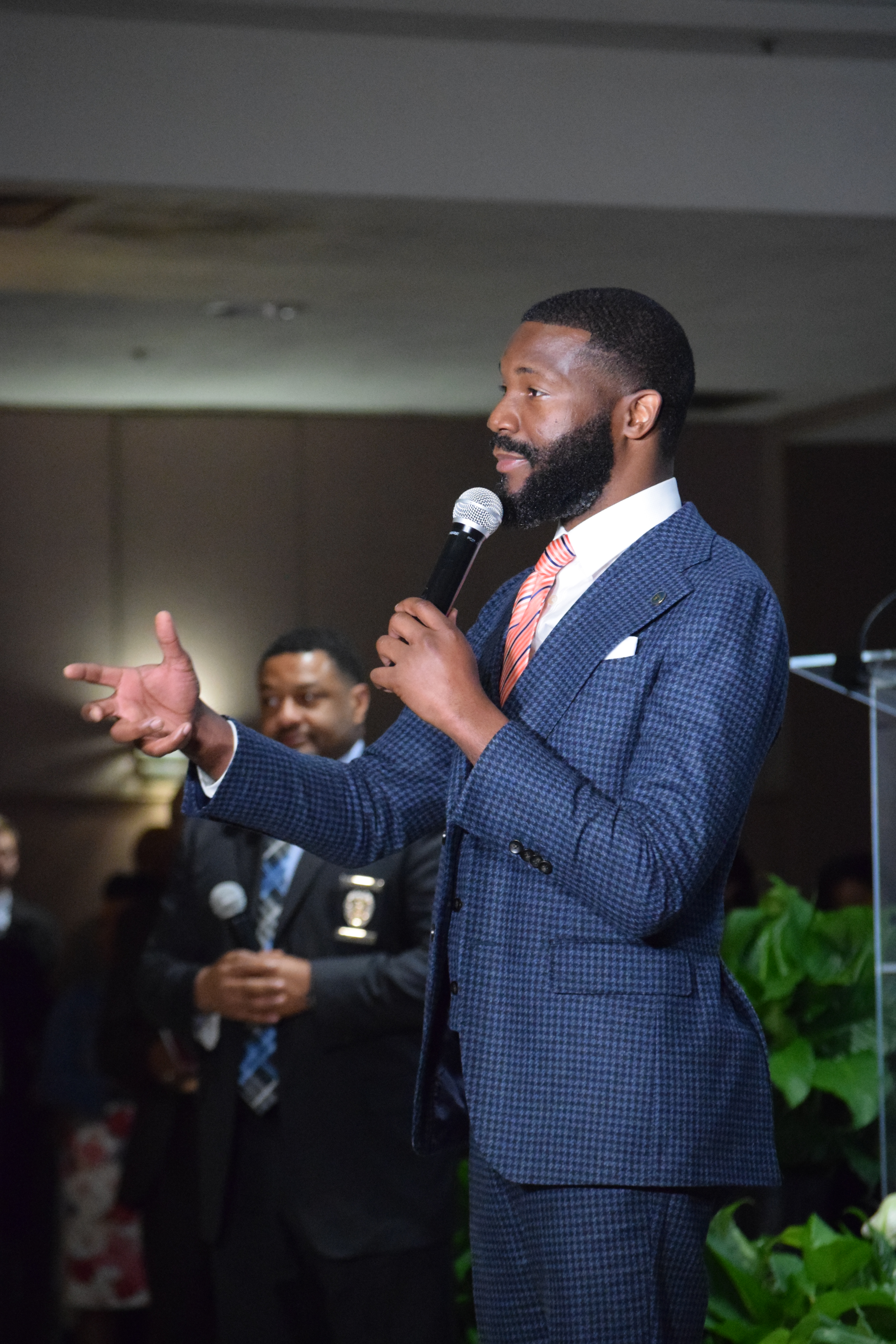
Woodfin speaking at a town hall meeting in January 2019.

Woodfin initially promised a forensic audit of city finances but instead commissioned a performance audit after taking office.

In 2018, his transition committee identified long-term underfunding in the city pension system. The administration increased pension contributions in subsequent budgets, claiming to have met full obligations for the first time in over a decade.

His administration has faced criticism regarding public records transparency, with some commentators alleging delays in fulfilling information requests.

==== Neighborhood revitalization ====
In his first two years, Woodfin allocated funding for street resurfacing, blight removal, and demolition of abandoned structures as part of neighborhood revitalization efforts.

He has stated that addressing urban blight was a central priority, arguing that previous efforts were insufficient.

Crime reduction has also been a major focus of his tenure. His nephew was killed in 2017 shortly before his election, and shortly after taking office he appointed a new police chief following the resignation of the previous chief.

His administration later launched the “PEACE” campaign, featuring public service announcements from families affected by gun violence.

Reported homicide totals in Birmingham fluctuated during his tenure, with some years reaching multi-decade highs, while the administration has cited reductions in certain categories of violent crime and increased firearm seizures.

==== Food deserts ====
One of Woodfin’s early campaign promises was to address food deserts in Birmingham.

==== COVID-19 response ====
In 2020, Woodfin and the Birmingham City Council implemented a COVID-19 response plan that included funding for emergency services, small business relief, and public health measures such as shelter-in-place and mask mandates.

==== Confederate monuments ====
Following protests in 2020, Woodfin ordered the removal of the Confederate Soldiers and Sailors Monument in Linn Park and issued emergency measures including a temporary curfew and restrictions on public gatherings. The action later resulted in legal challenges under the Alabama Memorial Preservation Act.

== National politics ==
Woodfin endorsed Joe Biden in the 2020 Democratic presidential primary, despite having previously received support from Bernie Sanders during his 2017 mayoral campaign. Woodfin said: "We need somebody on the top of that ticket who can not only help down-ballot candidates be competitive, but also someone who can expand the map across the nation."

Woodfin was selected as one of seventeen speakers to jointly deliver the keynote address at the 2020 Democratic National Convention.

== Political views ==
Woodfin identifies as a political leftist and has supported policies including criminal justice reform, free college tuition, and marijuana legalization.

In a 2019 interview with The Root, Woodfin said that while he supports many progressive policies, he also believes electoral success requires broad coalition-building and engagement with moderate voters.

During his 2017 mayoral campaign, Woodfin pledged to make Birmingham a "sanctuary city," but later shifted toward describing the city as a "welcoming city" in office.

Woodfin has also acknowledged climate change and signed the Alabama Mayors for 100% Sustainable Energy pledge in 2018. His administration has supported initiatives related to environmental resilience and flood mitigation.

== Personal life ==
Woodfin grew up with three siblings. His older brother, Ralph, was killed by gun violence in 2011. His nephew, Ralph Woodfin III, was also killed in August 2017.

He is married and has two daughters. He is a Christian and attends Sixth Avenue Baptist Church in Birmingham. He is a fan of Mannie Fresh, Dr. Dre, The Neptunes, and Big K.R.I.T.

Political offices
Preceded by William A. Bell	Mayor of Birmingham; 2017–present	Incumbent
Party political offices
Preceded by Elizabeth Warren	Keynote Speaker of the Democratic National Convention; 2020; Served alongside: Stacey Abrams, Raumesh Akbari, Colin Allred, Brendan Boyle, Yvanna Cancela, Kathleen Clyde, Nikki Fried, Robert Garcia, Malcolm Kenyatta, Marlon Kimpson, Conor Lamb, Mari Manoogian, Victoria Neave, Jonathan Nez, Sam Park, Denny Ruprecht	Succeeded by Joe Biden
