= May 2026 Alabama Amendment 1 =

2026 referendum

- May 19, 2026
- Add to List of Non-Bailable Offenses Amendment

Results
Choice	Votes	%
Yes	691,002	81.58%
No	155,985	18.42%
Valid votes	846,987	100.00%
Invalid or blank votes	0	0.00%
Total votes	846,987	100.00%
- County results Yes: 50–60% 60–70% 70–80% 80–90% 90–100%

Alabama Amendment 1, also known as the Add to List of Non-Bailable Offenses Amendment, is a legislatively referred constitutional amendment that appeared on the ballot in the U.S. state of Alabama on May 19, 2026. The amendment passed.

== Background ==
Following the killing of Aniah Blanchard, the Alabama Legislature passed Aniah's Law, a law that reformed the bail system in Alabama. It created a list of offenses that judges could deny the opportunity for bail and was approved by voters in 2022. In April 2025, the Alabama House of Representatives passed a bill that would expand the list of offenses. The same bill passed the Alabama Senate in February.

== Impact ==
The amendment resulted in the addition of the following crimes:

- Solicitation, attempt, or conspiracy to commit murder
- Firing a gun into an occupied dwelling, building, railroad locomotive, railroad car, aircraft, automobile, truck, or watercraft.

== Endorsements ==
Yes

Statewide officials

- Kay Ivey, governor of Alabama (2017–present) (Republican)
- Steve Marshall, attorney general of Alabama (2017–present) (Republican)

State legislators

- Will Barfoot, SD-25 (2018–present) (Republican)
- Chip Brown, HD-105 (2018–present) (Republican)

Local officials

- Ron Anders Jr., mayor of Auburn (2018–present)
- Ranae Bartlett, mayor of Madison (2025–present)
- Tommy Battle, mayor of Huntsville (2008–present)
- Spiro Cheriogotis, mayor of Mobile (2025–present)
- Nick Derzis, mayor of Hoover (2025–present)
- Walt Maddox, mayor of Tuscaloosa (2005–present)
- Steven Reed, mayor of Montgomery (2019–present)
- Randall Woodfin, mayor of Birmingham (2017–present)

== Results ==
Alabama Amendment 1
Choice	Votes	%
For	691,002	81.58
Against	155,985	18.42
Total	846,987	100.00
Source: Secretary of State of Alabama
