= 2025 Hoover mayoral election =

Alabama local election

- August 26, 2025
Candidate	Nick Derzis	Frank Brocato
Party	Nonpartisan	Nonpartisan
Popular vote	9,672	7,743
Percentage	55.5%	44.5%
Mayor before election
Frank Brocato
Elected mayor
Nick Derzis

The 2025 Hoover mayoral election was held on August 26, 2025, to elect the mayor of Hoover, Alabama. Incumbent mayor Frank Brocato lost re-election to a third consecutive term, finishing in second behind police chief Nick Derzis.

== Candidates ==
=== Declared ===
- Frank Brocato, incumbent mayor
- Nick Derzis, Hoover police chief

=== Declined ===
- Gene Smith, former city council president (running for city council)

== Endorsements ==
Frank Brocato

Local officials

- Lindsey Allison, member of the Shelby County Commission
- Ron Anders Jr., mayor of Auburn
- Walt Maddox, mayor of Tuscaloosa
- Sandy Stimpson, mayor of Mobile
Nick Derzis

Statewide officials

- Steve Marshall, Attorney General of Alabama (2017–present)

Local officials

- Mike Bolin, member of the Jefferson County Commission from the 5th district
- Danny Carr, District Attorney of Jefferson County

Individuals

- Andy Kennedy, UAB Blazers men's basketball head coach

== Results ==
2025 Hoover mayoral election
Candidate	Votes	%
Nick Derzis	9,672	55.54
Frank Brocato (incumbent)	7,743	44.46
Total votes	17,415	100.00

== See also ==
- List of mayors of Hoover, Alabama
