= 2025 Madison, Alabama municipal election =

- August 26, 2025 (general); September 23, 2025 (runoff)

The 2025 Madison, Alabama municipal election was held on August 26, 2025, to select the next mayor and city council members of Madison, Alabama. Runoff elections were held on September 23, 2025.

== Mayoral election ==
=== Candidates ===
==== Declared ====
- Ranae Bartlett, city councilor from the 5th district
- Margi Daly, former city and county commissioner in New Jersey
- Steve Smith, city administrator

==== Declined ====
- Paul Finley, incumbent mayor

=== Results ===
2025 Madison mayoral election
Candidate	Votes	%
Ranae Bartlett	4,581	56.09
Steve Smith	2,620	32.08
Margi Daly	966	11.83
Total votes	8,167	100.00

== City council election ==
=== District 1 ===
==== Candidates ====
===== Declared =====
- Maura Wroblewski, incumbent councilor

=== Results ===
2025 Madison City Council election, district 1
Candidate	Votes	%
Maura Wroblewski (incumbent)	Unopposed	100.00

=== District 2 ===
==== Candidates ====
===== Declared =====
- David Bier, entrepreneur

===== Declined =====
- Connie Spears, incumbent councilor

=== Results ===
2025 Madison City Council election, district 2
Candidate	Votes	%
David Bier	Unopposed	100.00

=== District 3 ===
==== Candidates ====
===== Declared =====
- Billie Goodson, chair of the Madison Police Advisory Committee

===== Declined =====
- Teddy Powell, incumbent councilor

=== Results ===
2025 Madison City Council election, district 3
Candidate	Votes	%
Billie Goodson	Unopposed	100.00

=== District 4 ===
==== Candidates ====
===== Declared =====
- Rachel Homolak, conservative activist
- Michael McKay, fraud examiner

===== Declined =====
- Greg Shaw, incumbent councilor

==== Results ====
2025 Madison City Council election, district 4
Candidate	Votes	%
Michael McKay	656	73.21
Rachel Homolak	240	26.79
Total votes	896	100.00

=== District 5 ===
==== Candidates ====
===== Declared =====
- Alice Lessmann, school board member

===== Declined =====
- Ranae Bartlett, incumbent councilor (running for mayor)

=== Results ===
2025 Madison City Council election, district 5
Candidate	Votes	%
Alice Lessmann	Unopposed	100.00

=== District 6 ===
==== Candidates ====
===== Declared =====
- Karen Denzine, incumbent councilor
- Scott Harbour, businessman
- Erica White, electrical engineer

==== Results ====
2025 Madison City Council election, district 6
Candidate	Votes	%
Erica White	715	45.69
Scott Harbour	537	34.31
Karen Denzine (incumbent)	313	20.00
Total votes	1,565	100.00

==== Runoff ====
===== Results =====
2025 Madison City Council runoff election, district 6
Candidate	Votes	%
Erica White	751	62.32
Scott Harbour	454	37.68
Total votes	1,205	100.00

=== District 7 ===
==== Candidates ====
===== Declared =====
- John Seifert, incumbent councilor
- Kenneth Jackson, educator and volunteer

==== Results ====
2025 Madison City Council election, district 7
Candidate	Votes	%
Kenneth Jackson	707	53.72
John Seifert (incumbent)	609	46.28
Total votes	1,316	100.00

== See also ==
- List of mayors of Madison, Alabama
