= List of mayors of Madison, Alabama =

The following is a list of mayors of the city of Madison, Alabama, United States.

Former city hall building in Madison, Alabama (photo 2010)

- C.A. Strong, c.1915-1916
- J.L. Brewer, c.1923
- D.S. Lanier, c.1948
- C.H. Tribble, c.1951-1955
- E.J. Anderson, c.1959-1963
- E.O. Batson Jr., c.1967
- Burwell L. "Sonny" Wilbanks, 1969-1988
- (Nancy) Teague Cuddeback, c.1988-1991
- Ann van Leeuwen, c.1991-1992
- Charles "Chuck" Yancura, c.1992-2000
- Jan Wells, c.2000-2004
- Arthur S. "Sandy" Kirkindall, c.2004-2007
- Paul Finley, 2008-2012, 2016-2025
- Troy Trulock, 2012-2016
- Ranae Bartlett, 2025-present

== See also ==
- 2025 Madison, Alabama municipal election
- Madison history
