= Huntsville International Airport =

Airport in Alabama, US

Huntsville International Airport Carl T. Jones

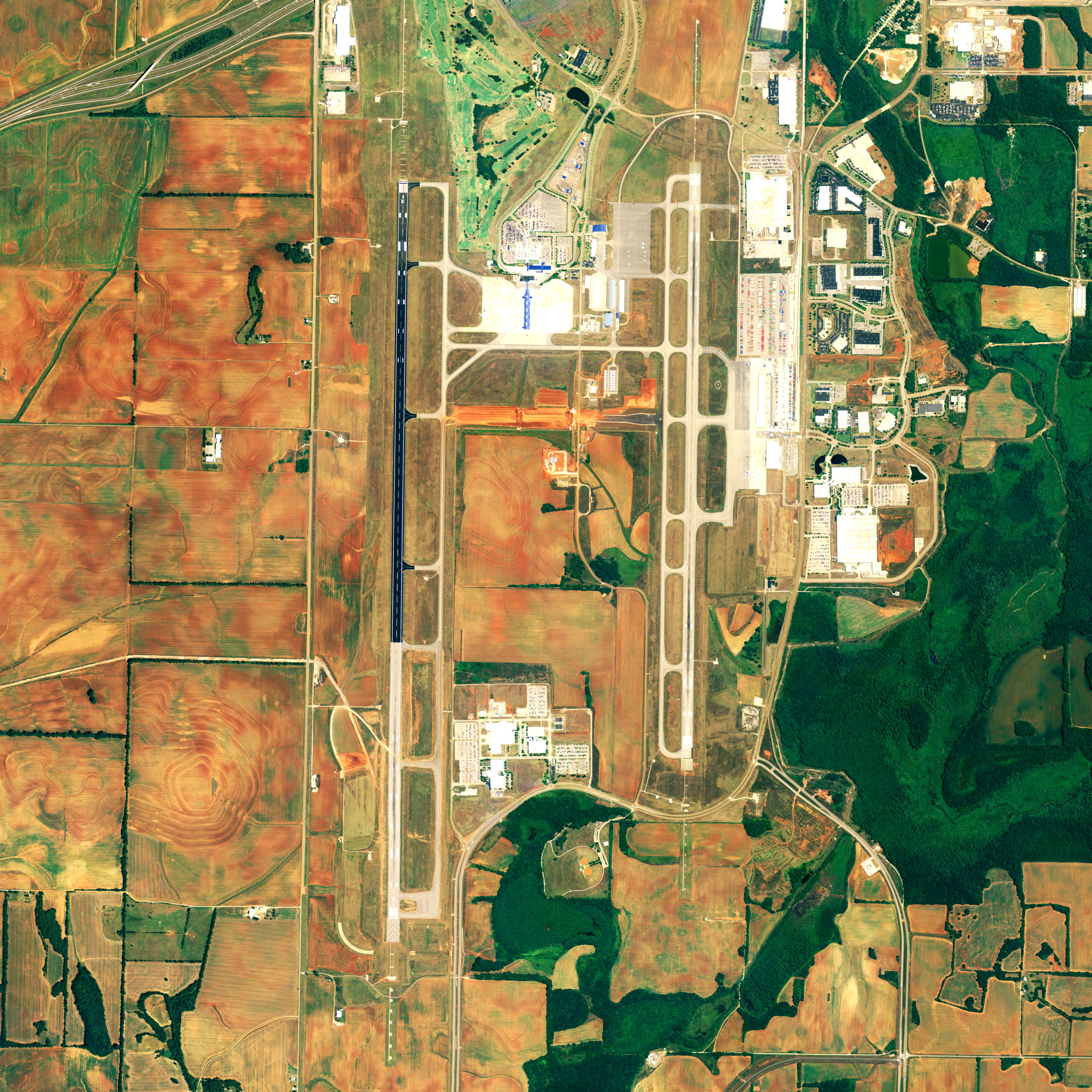
- NAIP 2006 orthophoto
- IATA: HSV; ICAO: KHSV; FAA LID: HSV; WMO: 72323

Summary
- Airport type: Public
- Owner: Huntsville / Madison County Airport Authority
- Serves: Huntsville, Alabama
- Elevation AMSL: 629 ft (192 m)
- Coordinates: 34°38′14″N 86°46′30″W
- Website: flyhuntsville.com

Maps
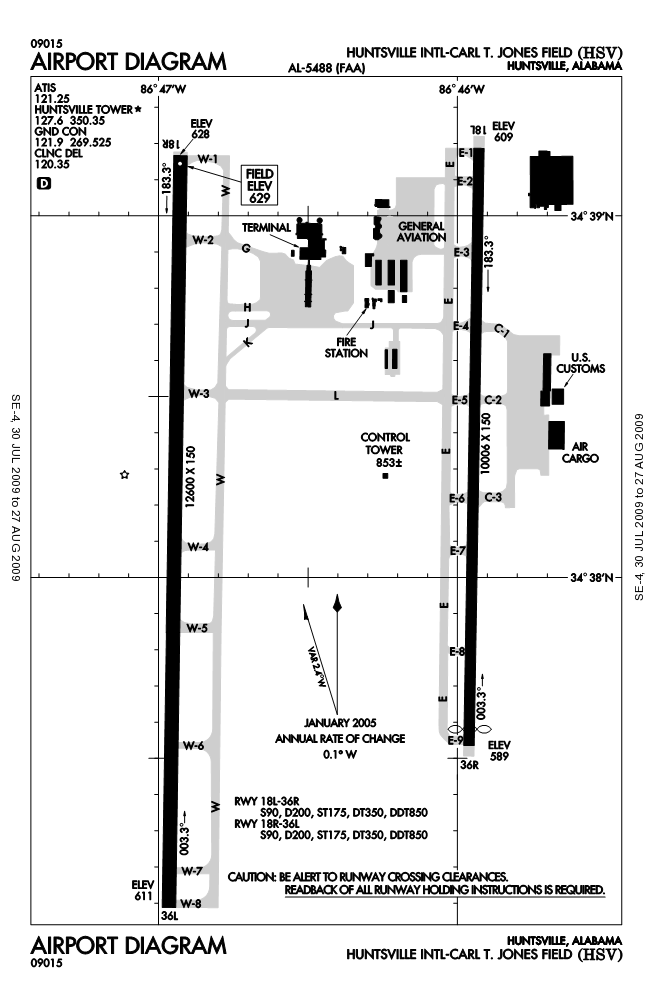
- FAA airport diagram
- Interactive map of Huntsville International Airport

Runways
Direction	Length		Surface
Direction	ft	m	Surface
18R/36L	12,600	3,840	Asphalt
18L/36R	10,001	3,048	Asphalt

Statistics (2025)
- Total Passengers: 1,722,857
- Aircraft operations (2024): 59,632
- Source: Federal Aviation Administration

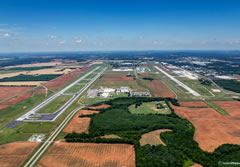
Drone Shot, HSV International Airport

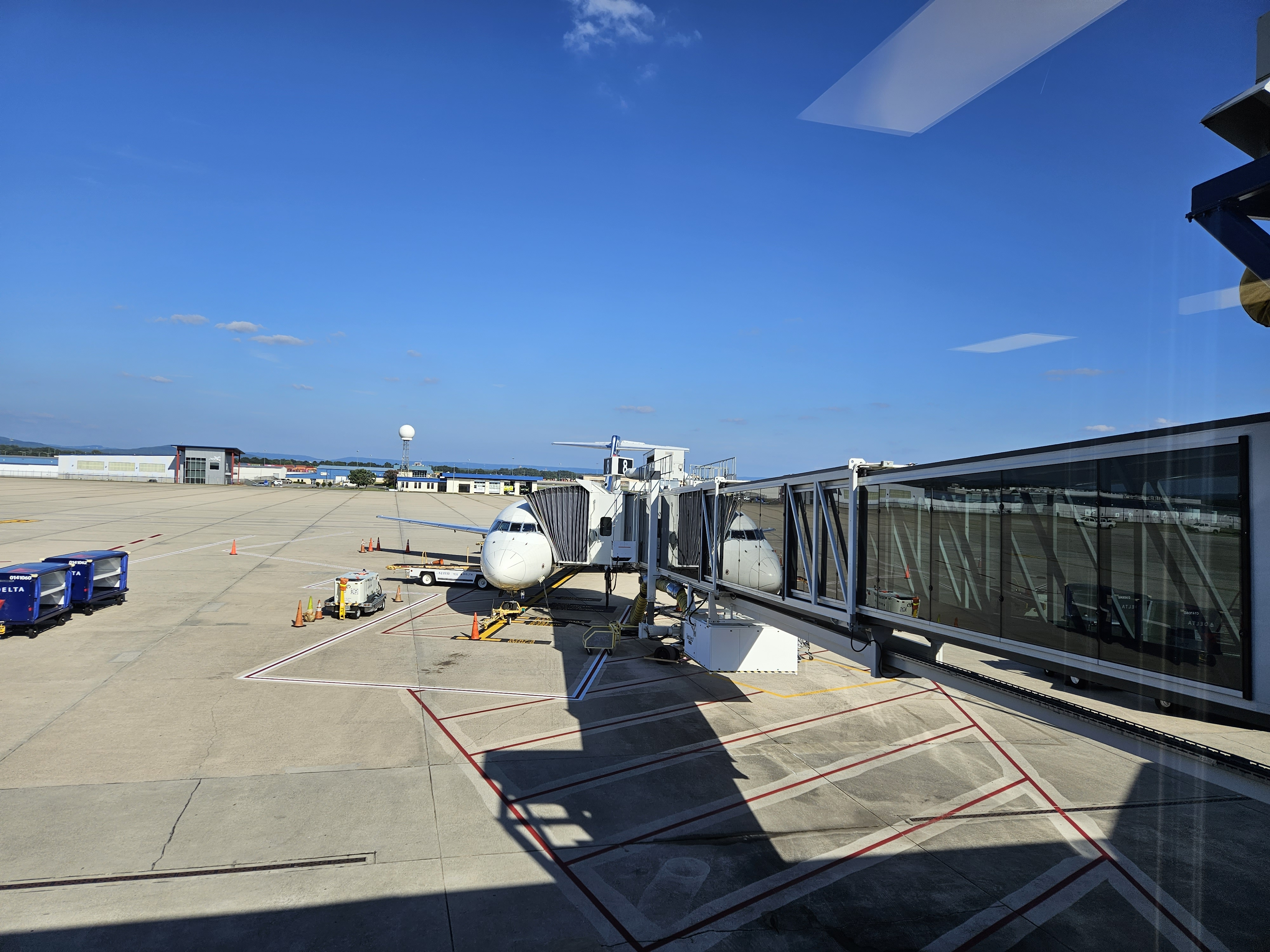
Picture inside the Terminal, HSV Airport

Huntsville International Airport (IATA: HSV, ICAO: KHSV, FAA LID: HSV) (Carl T. Jones) is a public airport and spaceport ten miles southwest of downtown Huntsville, in Madison County, Alabama, United States. The FAA has designated the Huntsville International Airport as a Re-entry site for the Dream Chaser, a spaceplane operated by Sierra Space to make reentries from Low Earth Orbit (LEO).

The airport is part of the Port of Huntsville (along with the International Intermodal Center and Jetplex Industrial Park), and serves the Huntsville-Decatur area. Opened in October 1967 as the Huntsville Jetport, it was the third airport for Huntsville. The airport has 12 gates with restrooms, shops, restaurants, phones and murals depicting aviation and space exploration scenes. The airport also has a 3-star hotel on the premises. The Four Points by Sheraton is located above the ticketing area and lobby, (adjacent to the terminal is a parking garage and to opposite sides are the control tower and a golf course).

The airport's west runway, at 12,600 ft (3,800 m), is the second longest commercial runway in the southeastern United States, being 416 ft (127 m) shorter than the longest runway at Miami International Airport. Huntsville is frequently used as a diversion airport from larger hubs in the Southeast, such as Atlanta, due to its long runways and sophisticated snow removal and de-icing equipment.

The airport's "Fly Huntsville" marketing campaign encourages passengers to depart from Huntsville instead of driving to Birmingham or Nashville. An August 2009 report by the Bureau of Transportation Statistics for the first quarter of 2009 revealed that Huntsville passengers paid, on average, was the highest airfares in the United States. However, the airport reported that commercial airline passenger traffic increased 2.3% in January 2010 over the previous year.

The National Plan of Integrated Airport Systems for 2011–2015 called it a primary commercial service airport. Federal Aviation Administration records say the airport had 612,690 passenger boardings (enplanements) in calendar year 2008, 572,767 in 2009 and 606,127 in 2010.

== History ==
The original airport, Huntsville Flying Field/Mayfair Airport, was south of the city. It had sod runways, no lighting and opened in the early 1930s. By 1934 the airport had four dirt/sod runways, southwest of today's intersection of Whitesburg Drive and Bob Wallace Avenue.

A second airport south of downtown opened in 1941 with two paved runways, Runway 18/36 being 4,000' long. The terminal building was a wooden shack at the northeast end of Runway 5/23; the National Weather Service opened at the municipal airport in 1958. The second airport was near today's intersection of Memorial Parkway and Airport Road; traces of runways and terminal facilities can be seen from the air.

Huntsville's first scheduled jets were United 727s in 1966. Carl T. Jones Field opened in 1967, west of the city along Highway 20 and County Line Road. A ribbon cutting ceremony was held 15 September 1968 with Dr. Wernher von Braun and Senator John Sparkman in attendance.

On May 21, 2021, Breeze Airways announced that Huntsville International Airport would be one of the airline’s original 16 launch destinations, with nonstop service beginning later that year using the Airbus A220 and Embraer E190/E195 aircraft. The announcement marked the arrival of a low-cost carrier at the airport, following Frontier's departure, and positioned Huntsville as an early partner in Breeze’s national network launch.

== Airport facilities ==
The airport covers 6,000 acres (2,428 ha) at an elevation of 629 feet (192 m). It has two asphalt runways: 18R/36L is 12,600 by 150 feet (3,840 x 46 m) and 18L/36R is 10,001 by 150 feet (3,048 x 46 m).

== Airlines and destinations ==
Huntsville International Airport is served by five passenger airlines including: Allegiant Air, American Airlines, Breeze Airways, United Airlines, and Delta Air Lines. Huntsville passenger airlines represent the biggest three international airline alliances in the world. Some services are flown by regional affiliates via code sharing agreements.

Huntsville International Airport serves eight cargo airlines including: Cargolux, Latam Cargo, Atlas Air, DSV, Fedex Express, Qatar Airways Cargo, UPS and Kerry Logistics Network.

=== Passenger ===
Airlines	Destinations
Allegiant Air	Fort Lauderdale, Orlando/Sanford, St. Petersburg/Clearwater Seasonal: Gulf Shores
American Airlines	Seasonal: Dallas/Fort Worth
American Eagle	Charlotte, Chicago–O'Hare, Dallas/Fort Worth, Washington–National; Seasonal: Miami
Breeze Airways	Fort Lauderdale, Las Vegas, Orlando, Tampa
Delta Air Lines	Atlanta
Delta Connection	Atlanta, Detroit, New York–LaGuardia
United Express	Chicago–O'Hare, Denver, Houston–Intercontinental, Washington–Dulles

=== Cargo ===
Airlines	Destinations
FedEx Feeder operated by Baron Aviation	Memphis

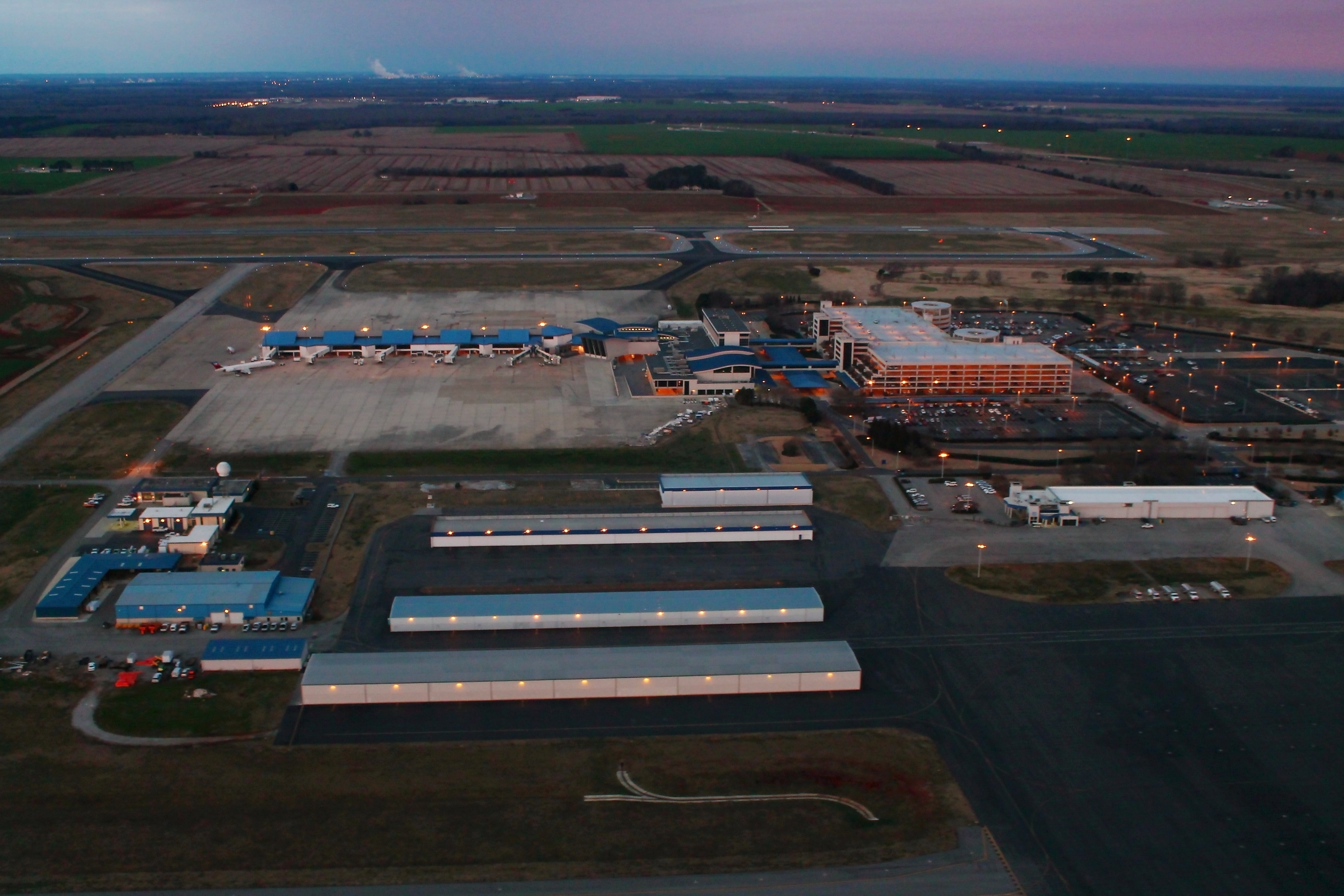
Aerial Photo, HSV Airport

== Statistics ==
=== Top destinations ===
Busiest domestic routes from HSV (August 2025 – July 2026)
Rank	Airport	Passengers	Carriers
1	Atlanta, Georgia	256,210	Delta
2	Dallas/Fort Worth, Texas	129,340	American
3	Charlotte, North Carolina	83,140	American
4	Washington–National, Virginia	64,000	American
5	Chicago–O'Hare, Illinois	63,410	American, United
6	Houston–Intercontinental, Texas	62,470	United
7	Denver, Colorado	47,000	United
8	Washington–Dulles, Virginia	44,000	United
9	Detroit, Michigan	31,050	Delta
10	Orlando, Florida	29,210	Breeze

=== Other statistics ===
HSV Airport Annual Passengers 2010–Present
	Passengers	Change from previous year
2010	1,247,475	▲6.5%
2011	1,263,272	▲1.3%
2012	1,187,710	▼6.0%
2013	1,040,278	▼12.4%
2014	1,075,713	▲3.4%
2015	1,069,830	▼0.5%
2016	1,079,028	▲0.9%
2017	1,063,538	▼1.4%
2018	1,184,374	▲11.4%
2019	1,445,365	▲20.9%
2020	559,420	▼61.3%
2021	940,830	▲122.8%
2022	1,201,105	▲27.7%
2023	1,473,629	▲22.7%
2024	1,591,139	▲11.1%
2025	1,722,857	▲5.3%

Airline Market Share August (August 2025 – July 2026)
Rank	Airline	Passengers	Market Share
1	Delta	440,000	25.19%
2	CommuteAir	211,000	12.10%
3	PSA	207,000	11.86%
4	SkyWest	206,000	11.81%
5	Envoy	171,000	9.77%
	Other	511,000	29.27%

== Past airline service ==
In 1969–80, Huntsville had nonstop or direct flights to Los Angeles, Florida and Texas during the U.S. space program. These flights served the NASA Marshall Space Flight Center in Huntsville.

In June 1967, Eastern Airlines introduced "The Space Corridor" linking Huntsville with St. Louis, Seattle and the NASA Kennedy Space Center in Florida. In the June 13, 1967, timetable, Eastern Boeing 727-100s flew to St. Louis and on to Seattle, and nonstop to Orlando continuing to Melbourne, Florida, near the Kennedy Space Center. Eastern flew direct Douglas DC-9-30s to Houston, home of the NASA Johnson Space Center, via New Orleans in the late 1960s. Eastern had direct jets to Chicago during the early 1970s via Nashville. In April 1975, Eastern served Nashville, Orlando and St. Louis nonstop from Huntsville on 727s and DC-9s.

In November 1967, Eastern scheduled nine departures each weekday from the new airport while United had four and Southern had 17.

United Airlines started nonstop Boeing 727-100s to Los Angeles in 1969. United first served Huntsville in 1961 when it acquired Capital Airlines which had scheduled Vickers Viscounts nonstop from Huntsville's old airport (at 34.686°N 86.589°W) (1949 diagram) to Memphis, Knoxville and Washington, D.C., and direct to New York (LaGuardia and Newark) and Philadelphia. Until 1967, United used the same Viscounts, then introduced Boeing 727-100s into Huntsville in 1966. In April 1975, United served Greensboro, Knoxville, Los Angeles and Washington, D.C., nonstop from Huntsville on 727s and 737s. Raleigh/Durham service was added by 1979. In August 1982, United had direct 727s to Los Angeles, San Francisco and Denver and nonstop Boeing 737-200s to Washington, D.C.

Southern Airways also served Huntsville. In the late 1960s, Southern introduced 75-seat Douglas DC-9-10s into their fleet which had consisted of 40-seat Martin 4-0-4. Southern's timetable in September 1968 listed nonstop jets to Atlanta, Memphis, New Orleans and Muscle Shoals, AL; Southern was still flying Martin 4-0-4s from Huntsville. In April 1975, Southern DC-9s flew nonstop to Atlanta, Chattanooga, Memphis, Montgomery, Muscle Shoals, Nashville, New Orleans and Orlando. Southern had direct DC-9s to New York City (LaGuardia Airport), Washington, D.C. (Dulles International Airport), Denver, St. Louis, Detroit and Wichita. In 1979, Southern merged with North Central Airlines to form Republic Airlines which continued to serve Huntsville, by that time having dropped Chattanooga and Montgomery service and having added Greenville/Spartanburg and Mobile/Pascagoula service. Republic was acquired by Northwest Airlines which later merged with Delta Air Lines.

Service to Atlanta hit a high point in early 1985 when 17 nonstops a day flew HSV to ATL on four airlines, three flying "main line" jets. In the February 15, 1985, Official Airline Guide, Eastern Airlines had Boeing 727-100s and Douglas DC-9-50s, Republic Airlines was flying Douglas DC-9-10s, DC-9-30s and DC-9-50s, United Airlines flew 727-100s and Delta Connection, operated by Atlantic Southeast Airlines (ASA, which became ExpressJet), had de Havilland Canada DHC-7s and Shorts 360s. Today, Delta Air Lines and affiliate Delta Connection are the only airlines between Huntsville and Atlanta.

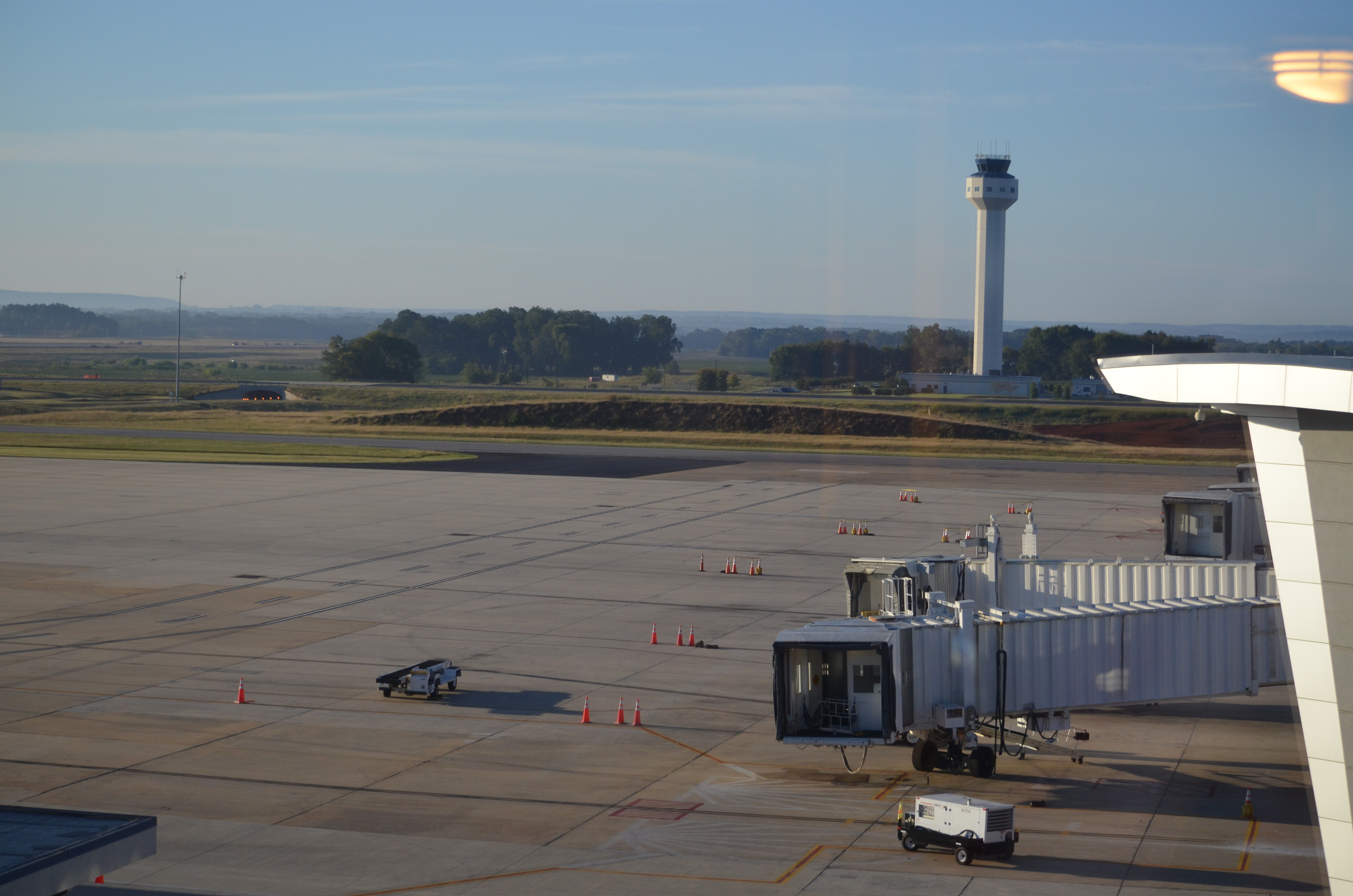
View of the new control tower

By 1989, the airport was linked to major airline hubs: Delta served Atlanta and Dallas/Fort Worth, Eastern served Atlanta, American served Dallas/Fort Worth and Nashville, Northwest served Memphis, and United served Chicago and Washington Dulles. United and American flew nonstop to Birmingham, United continued to fly nonstop to Knoxville, and Delta had a daily flight to Memphis. United pulled out entirely by 1995, while USAir entered the market in the early 1990s with daily flights to Charlotte.

Only Delta Air Lines operates regular service on main line jets to the airport now. American Airlines serves the airport with mainline jets seasonally. Frontier previously had Airbus A320 service nonstop to Denver and Orlando. Delta operates Boeing 717 and Boeing 737-800 and 900ER aircraft to Atlanta. The airline previously flew Douglas DC-9-50s nonstop to Atlanta with some flights being flown by ExpressJet Canadair CRJ-700 and CRJ-200s as Delta Connection service to ATL; however, all services to ATL have been switched to mainline jets. The airport had service to New Orleans on GLO Airlines, but that ended after the airline filed for bankruptcy in 2017. Frontier Airlines ended service in 2022.

== Expansion ==
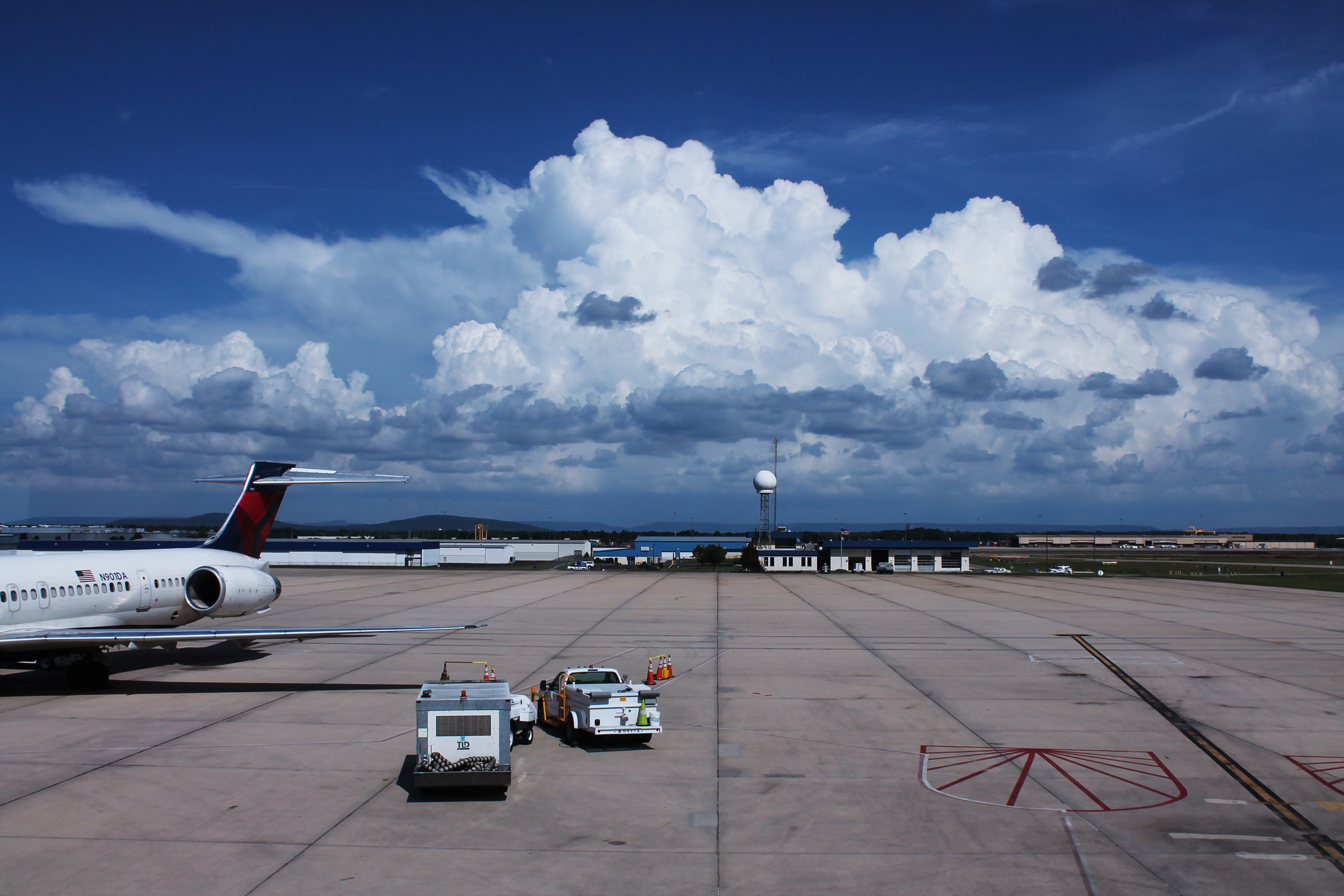
View of the ramp

In 1989, Huntsville International became the first airport in the United States to install an ASR-9 dual-channel airport surveillance radar system. and became one of five airports in the United States to use glass-walled jet bridges. In 2015, Thyssenkrupp Airport Systems manufactured and installed new glass jet bridges, making Huntsville International Airport the first in the Southeast to enhance its facility by using all glass jet bridges.

Currently, Huntsville International is undergoing major renovations on its runways and concourse facilities to meet the expected future demand and flow of passengers and goods.

Huntsville International Airport will potentially be expanded to provide three additional runways that would be built to the west of County Line Road. This project is one of many projects that are included in the Huntsville area Metropolitan Planning Organization's TRIP (Transportation Regionally Innovative Projects) 2045 plan. This project would also include a new loop around the airport, replacing County Line Road and Boeing Boulevard.

== Accidents and incidents ==
- On October 17, 1965, a United Airlines Douglas DC-6 (N37519) After accelerating through the V1 speed during takeoff the captain raised the front landing gear from the runway. Suddenly the nose undercarriage retracted and the aircraft sank back, contacting the runway with its nose. The captain retarded the throttles and the plane slid to a stop 272 feet beyond the runway end. All passengers and crew survived. The aircraft was destroyed and written off.
- On June 18, 2014, an IAI Westwind corporate aircraft crashed upon takeoff, killing all three on board.

== See also ==
- List of airports in Alabama
