= Tony Petelos =

American politician (born 1953)

Personal details
- Born: July 22, 1953 (age 73) Birmingham, Alabama, U.S.
- Party: Republican
- Education: University of Alabama, Birmingham

Tony Petelos is an Alabama politician, having served as a state legislator, the mayor of Hoover, Alabama, and the county manager for Jefferson County.

== Political career ==
A Republican, Petelos served in the Alabama House of Representatives from 1986 to 1997. After his career in the legislature, he served as the state's Commissioner of the Department of Human Resources after his appointment by Governor Fob James in 1997.

Petelos was mayor of Hoover, Alabama. He was elected to the office in September 2004.

Petelos was selected by the county commission to serve as commissioner of Jefferson County in September 2011.

He sat on the human resources state board, having been appointed by Governor Bob Riley.

== Personal life ==
Petelos grew up in Birmingham's Ensley neighborhood.

He is married to the former Teresa Bearden, a circuit judge in neighboring Bessemer. They met while both were students at the University of Alabama at Birmingham.

== See also ==
- List of mayors of Hoover, Alabama
