= Madison, Alabama =

City in Alabama, United States

- City
- City of Madison
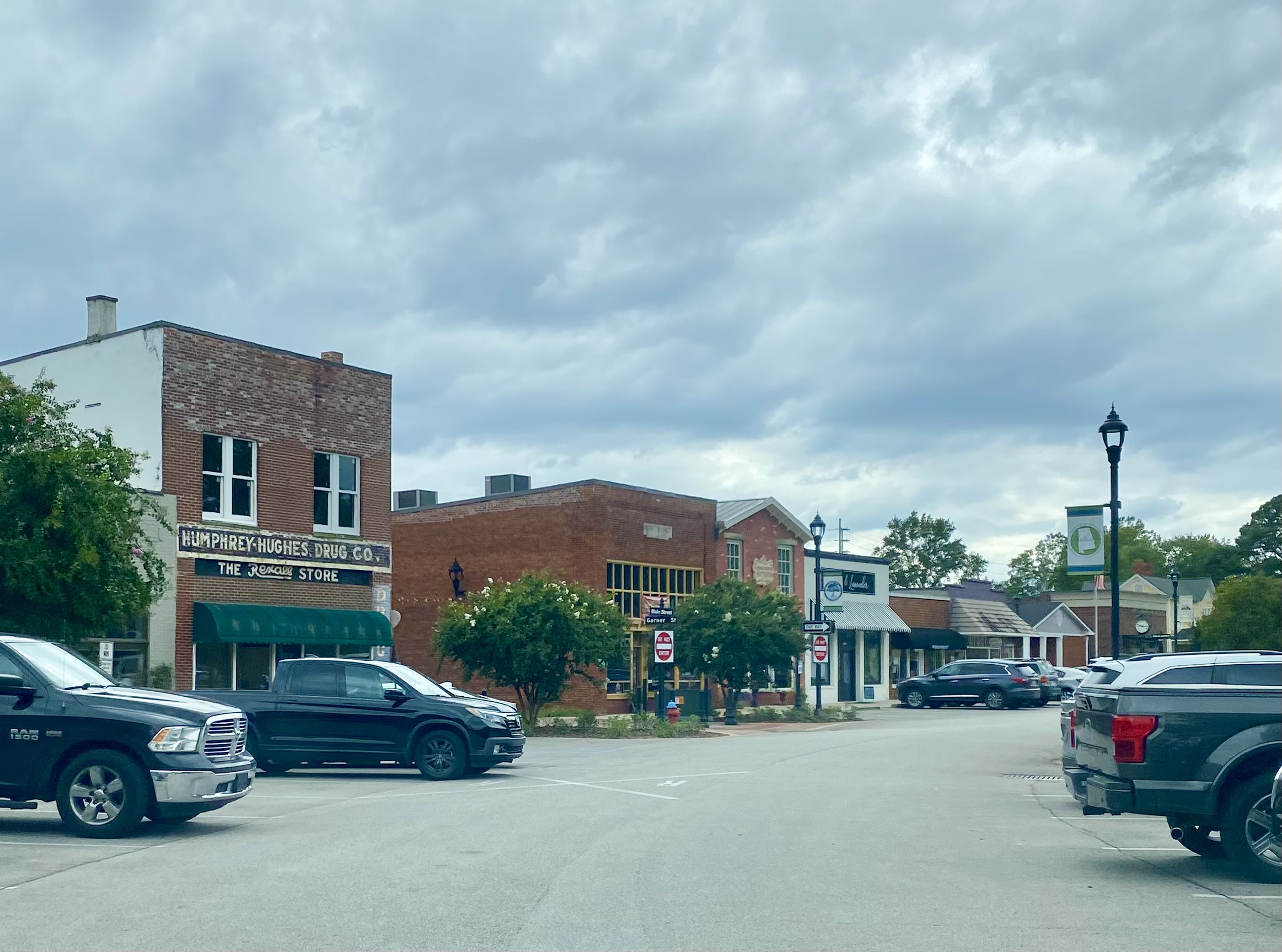
- The Madison Historic District was added to the National Register of Historic Places on March 29, 2006.

- Seal Logo
- Motto: "Plant Your Roots"
- Interactive map of Madison, Alabama
- Coordinates: 34°42′40″N 86°43′52″W
- Country: United States
- State: Alabama
- Counties: Madison, Limestone
- Founded: 1818
- Incorporated: December 2, 1869

Government
  - Mayor: Ranae Bartlett

Area
  - City: 30.694 sq mi (79.497 km^{2})
  - Land: 30.563 sq mi (79.159 km^{2})
  - Water: 0.131 sq mi (0.339 km^{2})
- Elevation: 686 ft (209 m)

Population (2020)
  - City: 56,933
  - Estimate (2024): 64,029
  - Rank: US: 649th AL: 9th
  - Density: 2,086/sq mi (805/km^{2})
  - Urban: 329,066 (US: 122nd)
  - Urban density: 1,532/sq mi (591.6/km^{2})
  - Metro: 514,465 (US: 109th)
  - Metro density: 378/sq mi (145.9/km^{2})
  - Combined: 879,315 (US: 68th)
  - Combined density: 255.3/sq mi (98.57/km^{2})
- Time zone: UTC−6 (Central (CST))
  - Summer (DST): UTC−5 (CDT)
- ZIP Codes: 35756, 35757, 35758
- Area codes: 256 and 938
- FIPS code: 01-45784
- GNIS feature ID: 2404989
- Website: madisonal.gov

Madison is a city located primarily in Madison County, near the northern border of the U.S. state of Alabama. Madison extends west into neighboring Limestone County. The city is included in the Huntsville Metropolitan Area, the second-largest in the state, and is also included in the merged Huntsville-Decatur Combined Statistical Area. The population was 56,933 at the 2020 census. Madison is an enclave of Huntsville, which surrounds it on all sides, though there are some small unincorporated lands within Madison in Madison and Limestone counties and along the border with Huntsville.

Madison was mostly a small city for many years, with its population being around 400-500 for much of its history until the Redstone Arsenal was established to the southeast, which attracted many people to the area for jobs. This rapidly increased the city's population and stimulated economic growth. Many of Madison's residents work in Research Park or the Redstone Arsenal. Madison has been one of the fastest-growing cities in Alabama, as well as one of the wealthiest in the state. In 2022 census estimates, Madison was the ninth-largest city in Alabama, the eighth-densest city in Alabama, and the second-largest city in North Alabama after Huntsville.

== History ==
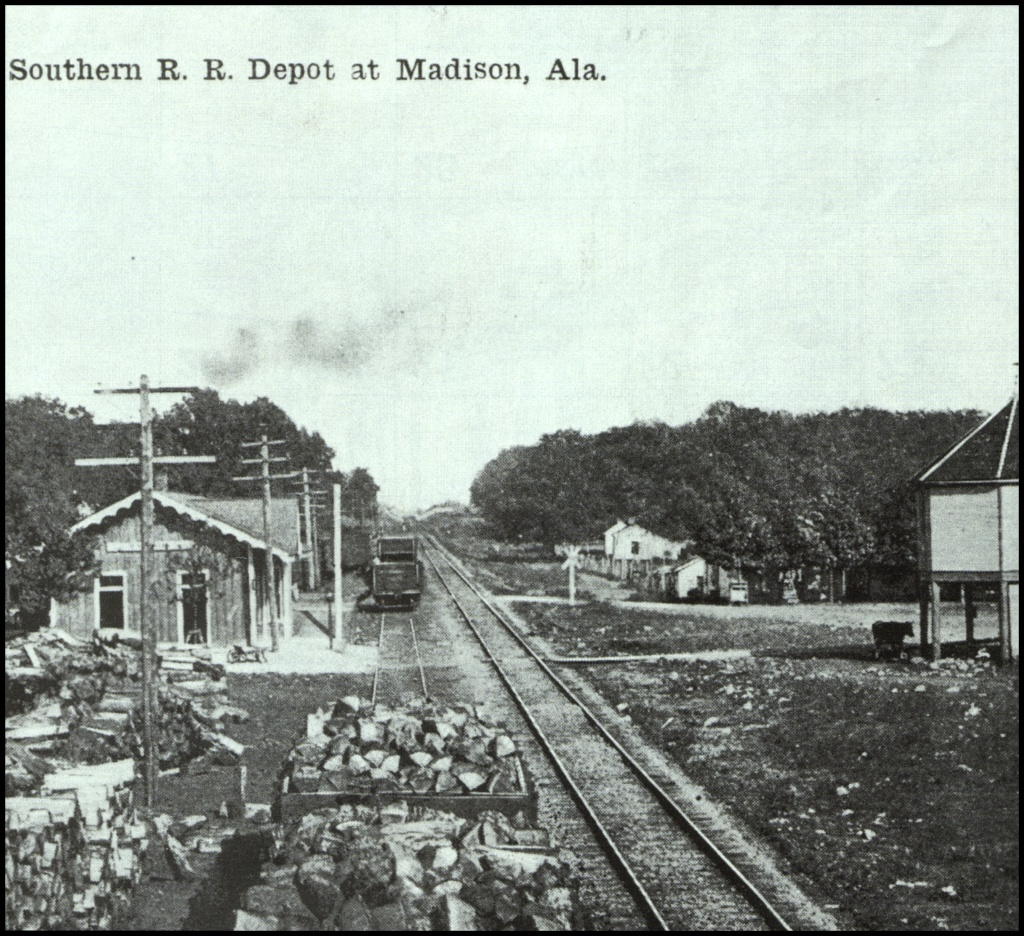
Southern Railroad Depot, Madison

The area was occupied historically by the Koasati (also known as Coushatta), a Muskogean-speaking people. Before them were thousands of years of indigenous cultures.

Madison's first European-American resident was John Cartwright, who settled in the area in 1818. The city was originally known as "Madison Station", as it developed in the 1850s around a stop of the Memphis & Charleston Railroad. Textile mills were built in the area in the late 19th century for processing and manufacture of cotton products.

Madison was the site of a battle in the American Civil War. On May 17, 1864, Col. Josiah Patterson's 5th Alabama Cavalry, supported by Col. James H. Stuart's cavalry battalion and a section of horse artillery, drove Col. Adam G. Gorgas's 13th Illinois Infantry Regiment from the city. Patterson's men captured the 13th Illinois Regiment's wagon train, taking 66 prisoners. They also burned Union supplies and tore up the railroad tracks before retreating. Portions of the 5th Ohio Cavalry, the 59th Indiana Infantry, and the 5th Iowa Infantry were sent in pursuit from Huntsville. They skirmished with Patterson's rear guard that evening at Fletcher's Ferry on the Tennessee River south of Madison.

The town was incorporated on December 2, 1869. From 1880 to 1950, rural Madison had a population of some 400-500 residents.

In World War II and the postwar period, military and NASA operations were moved to Huntsville, stimulating an increase in population in the region. Subsidized highways stimulated suburbanization, attracting residents to outlying areas where new homes were built. By 1980, Madison's population was 4,057. In the late 20th century, Madison's population increased rapidly as it developed as a suburb of Huntsville. In 1986, Madison voters overwhelmingly voted to remain independent by not merging with Huntsville. By 2010, its population had grown to 42,938, and over the following ten years it grew to a population of 56,933.

== Geography ==
According to the United States Census Bureau, the city has a total area of 30.694 square miles (79.50 km^{2}), of which 30.563 square miles (79.16 km^{2}) is land and 0.131 square miles (0.34 km^{2}), is water.

Madison is located at 34°42′54″N 86°44′23″W (34.711236, -86.731024), primarily within Madison County, while extending west into Limestone County. Downtown Huntsville is 11 miles (18 km) east of the center of Madison, although Huntsville also borders Madison to the south and west. Athens is 17 miles (27 km) to the northwest, and Decatur is 16 miles (26 km) to the southwest, across the Tennessee River.

== Demographics ==
Historical population
Census	Pop.	Note	%±
1880	410		—
1900	412		—
1910	426		3.4%
1920	435		2.1%
1930	431		−0.9%
1940	455		5.6%
1950	530		16.5%
1960	1,435		170.8%
1970	3,086		115.1%
1980	4,057		31.5%
1990	14,904		267.4%
2000	29,329		96.8%
2010	42,938		46.4%
2020	56,933		32.6%
2025 (est.)	67,968	▲	19.4%
U.S. Decennial Census; 2020 Census

=== 2020 census ===
As of the 2020 census, Madison had a population of 56,933, with 20,787 households and 15,540 families. The population density was 1,875.1 inhabitants per square mile (724/km^{2}).

The median age was 37.3 years. 27.2% of residents were under the age of 18 and 11.6% of residents were 65 years of age or older. For every 100 females there were 95.7 males, and for every 100 females age 18 and over there were 92.8 males age 18 and over.

99.7% of residents lived in urban areas, while 0.3% lived in rural areas.

Of these households, 41.1% had children under the age of 18 living in them. Of all households, 60.4% were married-couple households, 14.4% were households with a male householder and no spouse or partner present, and 21.8% were households with a female householder and no spouse or partner present. About 21.8% of all households were made up of individuals and 7.2% had someone living alone who was 65 years of age or older.

There were 21,980 housing units, of which 5.4% were vacant. The homeowner vacancy rate was 1.0% and the rental vacancy rate was 8.6%.

Racial composition as of the 2020 census
Race	Number	Percent
White	37,930	66.6%
Black or African American	8,455	14.9%
American Indian and Alaska Native	265	0.5%
Asian	4,437	7.8%
Native Hawaiian and Other Pacific Islander	76	0.1%
Some other race	1,103	1.9%
Two or more races	4,667	8.2%
Hispanic or Latino (of any race)	3,288	5.8%

=== 2010 census ===
As of the 2010 census, there were 42,938 people, 16,111 households and 11,770 families residing in the city. The population density was 1,450.9 inhabitants per square mile (560/km^{2}). There were 17,203 housing units. The average household size was 2.65, while the average family size was 3.16. 30.8% of the population was age 19 or younger, 61.0% was 20–64, and 8.2% was 65 or older. The median age was 37.0 years. The population was 49.3% male and 50.7% female.

The racial makeup of the city was 74.0% White, 14.6% Black or African American, 0.5% Native American, 7.0% Asian, 0.1% Pacific Islander, 1.3% from other races, and 2.6% from two or more races. 4.6% of the population were Hispanic or Latino of any race.

According to the Madison Chamber of Commerce, Madison was the fastest-growing city in Alabama as of 2010.

== Economy ==
=== Personal income ===
The median income for a household in the city was $134,655, and the per capita income for the city was $56,185. About 4.3% of the population are below the poverty line, including 5.9% of those under age 18 and 3.4% of those age 65 or over.

=== Industry ===
Madison's largest employer is Intergraph, a computer software company. It is a subsidiary of Hexagon, a Swedish software company that bought Intergraph in 2008 and invested in the city and area to improve it. Currently, they are working on a streetlight maintenance program for Madison. Thousands of Madison residents commute to jobs at Cummings Research Park and Redstone Arsenal in nearby Huntsville, about 12 miles away. The high-tech and academic positions in the area have attracted numerous highly educated, professional residents.

== Education ==
The Madison City Schools, formed in 1998, serves over 13,300 students from the city of Madison and town of Triana. NICHE's 2027 Best School Districts ranking places Madison City Schools at 4th in the state.

The school system currently has seven elementary schools serving grades K-5 (Columbia Elementary School, Heritage Elementary School, Horizon Elementary School, Madison Elementary School, Mill Creek Elementary School, Rainbow Elementary School, Midtown Elementary School, and Russell Branch Elementary School), three middle schools serving grades 6-8 (Discovery Middle School, Journey Middle School, and Liberty Middle School), and two high schools serving grades 9-12 (Bob Jones High School and James Clemens High School). There was formerly an additional elementary school, West Madison Elementary; however, it is permanently closed and planned to be adapted as a pre-K center. Madison Elementary, built about 1936, is the oldest school in the system while Russell Branch is the newest, opening in 2026.

In 2019, Madison residents approved a voluntary property tax increase in order to fund school growth and expansion. These funds were used to build Midtown Elementary School (completed in 2020) and were also used to construct Journey Middle School, opening for the 2023–2024 school year.

== Government ==
Madison has a mayor–council government. The Madison City Council has a member from each of seven districts. Every member and the mayor are elected every four years.

The 2025 Madison, Alabama municipal election, on August 26, elected Ranae Bartlett as mayor and the following council:

Madison City Council
District	Councillor
1	Maura Wroblewski
2	David Bier
3	Billie Goodson
4	Michael McKay
5	Alice Lessmann
6	Erica White
7	Kenneth Jackson

== Media ==
The Madison Record and the Madison County Record have been newspapers for the city since 1967. The Madison Weekly News was another local newspaper.

== Infrastructure ==
=== Roads ===
Madison is served by Interstate 565, US 72 (University Drive), and Madison Boulevard (Alabama State Route 20, and Alt. US 72) and Gillespie Road, as main routes for east–west traffic. Slaughter Road, Hughes Road, Wall Triana Highway, and County Line Road serve as main north–south roads in the city.

=== Rail and airline ===
The Norfolk Southern railway has the main line and a spur running through Madison. The Port of Huntsville, an intermodal center that includes Huntsville International Airport and a rail cargo center, is located just south of the city.

=== Transit ===
Dial-a-ride transit service is provided by Transportation for Rural Areas of Madison County (TRAM).

== Culture and entertainment ==
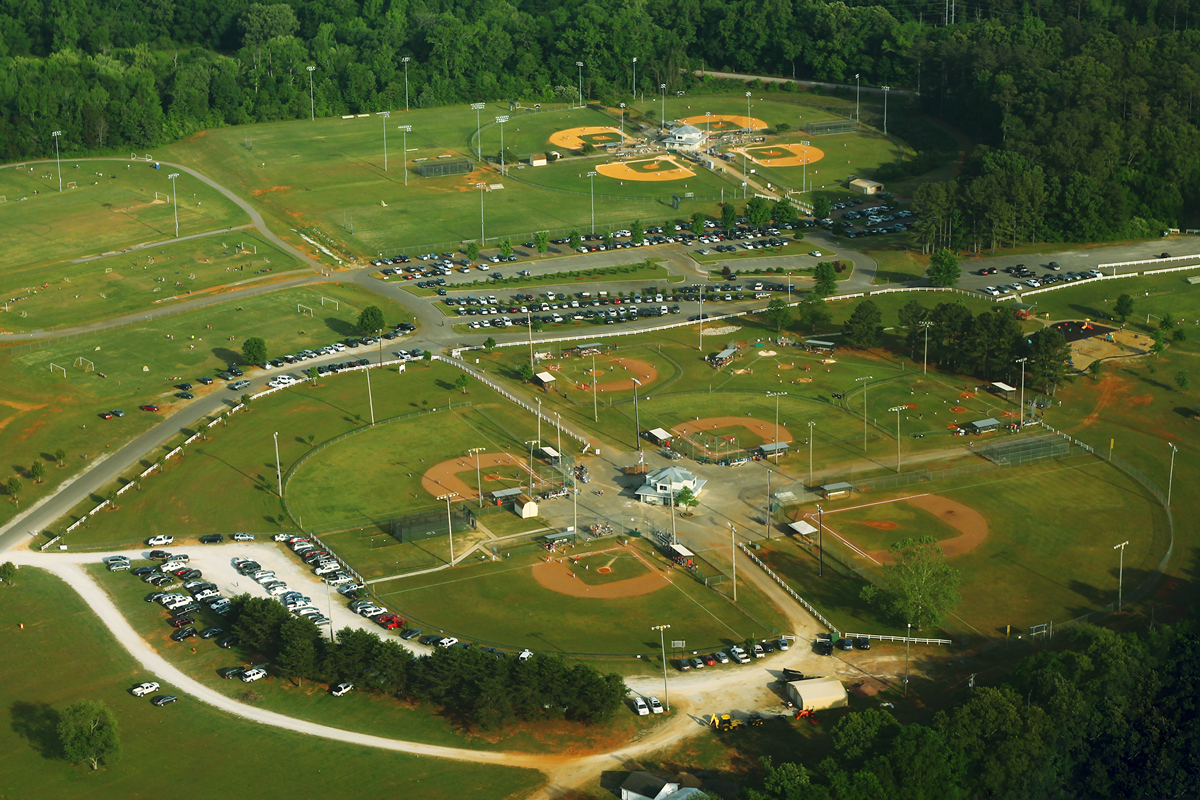
Palmer Park in Madison

=== Sports ===
The Rocket City Trash Pandas (formerly Mobile BayBears) is a Double A Southern League affiliate of the Los Angeles Angels that moved from Mobile, Alabama to Madison. The team was to begin play in Madison at Toyota Field beginning in April 2020, but coronavirus concerns delayed the team's debut until May 11, 2021.

=== Parks and greenways ===
The City of Madison has several greenways and parks within city limits.

Madison is working with the nearby cities of Huntsville and Decatur to create a 70-mile bicycling and walking trail.

== Notable people ==
- Mike Ball, politician and member of the Alabama House of Representatives
- Grant Dayton, Major League baseball pitcher
- Lewie Hardage, American football player and coach, baseball coach
- Robert Hoffman, actor, dancer, and choreographer
- Bill Holtzclaw, politician and Republican member of the Alabama State Senate
- Kerron Johnson, professional basketball player
- Kerryon Johnson, professional football player free agent
- Walter Jones, former offensive lineman at Florida State and a Hall of Famer for the Seattle Seahawks
- Chip Lindsey, college football coach for Troy University
- Will Mastin, entertainer and member of the Will Mastin Trio
- Reggie Ragland, American football linebacker
- Levi Randolph, basketball player for Hapoel Jerusalem of the Israeli Basketball Premier League
