= List of mayors of Hoover, Alabama =

The following is a list of mayors of the city of Hoover, Alabama, United States.

- Don Watts, c.1967
- Edward Ernest, c.1968-1969
- O.E. Braddock, 1969-1975
- John Hodnett, c.1975
- Frank Skinner, c.1980-1999
- Brian L. Skelton, 1999-2000
- Barbara McCollum c.2000-2004
- Tony Petelos, c.2004-2011
- Gary Ivey, 2011-2016
- Frank Brocato, 2016-2025
- Nick Derzis (2025- present)

== See also ==
- 2025 Hoover mayoral election
- Hoover history
