= 2025 Hoover City Council election =

Alabama local election

- August 26, 2025

The 2025 Hoover City Council election was held on August 26, 2025, to elect all seven members of the Hoover, Alabama, City Council. Runoff elections were held on September 23.

== Place 1 ==
=== Candidates ===
==== Declared ====
- Tanveer Patel, entrepreneur
- Robin Schultz, candidate for place 7 in 2016 and place 2 in 2020

==== Declined ====
- Curt Posey, incumbent councilor (endorsed Schultz)

=== Racist threats ===
Tanveer Patel received racist messages, including death threats on social media throughout her campaign. Her attorney is working with the Hoover Police Department and the FBI to locate individuals who made the threats. In a press conference, she stated that "hate will not win." Mayor Frank Brocato also responded to the threats, stating, "We will not let hate win."

=== Results ===
2025 Hoover City Council election, place 1
Candidate	Votes	%
Robin Schultz	10,815	64.94
Tanveer Patel	5,838	35.06
Total votes	16,653	100.00

== Place 2 ==
=== Candidates ===
==== Declared ====
- Clint Bircheat, member of the Shelby County Republican Party Executive Committee
- Kenneth Cox Jr., former Birmingham–Southern College cross country and track and field head coach
- Copeland Johnson, pre-law student
- Gene Smith, former councilor and candidate for mayor in 2020

==== Declined ====
- Sam Swiney, incumbent councilor

=== Results ===
2025 Hoover City Council election, place 2
Candidate	Votes	%
Kenneth Cox Jr.	5,411	33.30
Gene Smith	4,876	30.01
Clint Bircheat	3,966	24.41
Copeland Johnson	1,997	12.29
Total votes	16,250	100.00

=== Runoff ===
==== Results ====
2025 Hoover City Council election, place 2 runoff
Candidate	Votes	%
Gene Smith	4,644	53.71
Kenneth Cox Jr.	4,002	46.29
Total votes	8,646	100.00

== Place 3 ==
=== Candidates ===
==== Declared ====
- Liz Lane, artist and community advocate
- Ashley Lovell, resident
- Robert Williams

==== Declined ====
- John Lyda, incumbent councilor

=== Results ===
2025 Hoover City Council election, place 3
Candidate	Votes	%
Ashley Lovell	8,148	49.84
Liz Lane	4,695	28.72
Robert L. Williams	3,506	21.44
Total votes	16,349	100.00

=== Runoff ===
==== Results ====
2025 Hoover City Council election, place 3 runoff
Candidate	Votes	%
Ashley Lovell	6,351	73.07
Liz Lane	2,341	26.93
Total votes	8,692	100.00

== Place 4 ==
=== Candidates ===
==== Declared ====
- Christian Coleman, writer
- Khristi Driver, incumbent councilor
- Donna Mazur, former councilor

=== Results ===
2025 Hoover City Council election, place 4
Candidate	Votes	%
Khristi Driver (incumbent)	9,620	60.58
Christian Coleman	4,134	26.03
Donna Mazur	2,125	13,38
Total votes	15,879	100.00

== Place 5 ==
=== Candidates ===
==== Declared ====
- Steve Lawrence, risk management and commercial insurance professional
- Derrick Murphy, incumbent councilor

=== Results ===
2025 Hoover City Council election, place 5
Candidate	Votes	%
Derrick Murphy	10,065	61.86
Steve Lawrence	6,205	38.14
Total votes	16,270	100.00

== Place 6 ==
=== Candidates ===
==== Declared ====
- Casey Middlebrooks, incumbent councilor

=== Results ===
2025 Hoover City Council election, place 6
Candidate	Votes	%
Casey Middlebrooks (incumbent)	Unopposed	100.00

== Place 7 ==
=== Candidates ===
==== Declared ====
- Steve McClinton, incumbent councilor

=== Results ===
2025 Hoover City Council election, place 7
Candidate	Votes	%
Steve McClinton (incumbent)	Unopposed	100.00
