= Port of Huntsville =

Coordinates: 34°38′41″N 86°45′52″W

The Port of Huntsville is an inland port located in Huntsville, Alabama that consists of the:

- Huntsville International Airport
- International Intermodal Center
- Jetplex Industrial Park
