= LATAM Cargo =

LATAM Cargo can refer to a number of airlines, all members of the LATAM Airlines Group, based in Santiago, Chile, with subsidiaries across the rest of Latin America:

- LATAM Cargo Brasil
- LATAM Cargo Chile
- LATAM Cargo Colombia
- LATAM Cargo Mexico
