= Nick Derzis =

American politician

Mayor of Hoover
- Incumbent
- Assumed office November 3, 2025
- Preceded by: Frank Brocato

Personal details
- Born: Berlin, Germany
- Education: Samford University

Nicholas C. Derzis is an American politician and police officer who has served as the mayor of Hoover, Alabama, since 2025. He previously served as the city police chief.

== Early life and education ==
Derzis was born in Berlin, Germany. His father was a colonel in the United States Army, so Derzis lived in different places across the world throughout his early life. He lived in Arlington, Virginia, for nine years until he moved to Alabama. He received a bachelor's degree in criminal justice from Samford University.

== Career ==
Derzis worked as a police officer throughout most of his life. He served as the police chief of Hoover from 2005 to 2025, when he announced that he would be taking a leave of absence to run for mayor. He selected Norman McDuffey to replace him at an acting capacity in June.

== Mayor of Hoover ==
=== 2025 election ===
Derzis qualified to run in the 2025 mayoral election in June 2025. He ran against incumbent mayor Frank Brocato, and stated that Hoover needed a change in leadership. His campaign promises included transparency and fiscal responsibility. He defeated Brocato on August 26, 2025, with 55% of the vote.

=== Tenure ===
Derzis announced his transition team in September 2025, two months before he took office. He was sworn in on November 3, 2025. In January 2026, he gave his first State of the City address.
