= Ranae Bartlett =

Korean-American politician

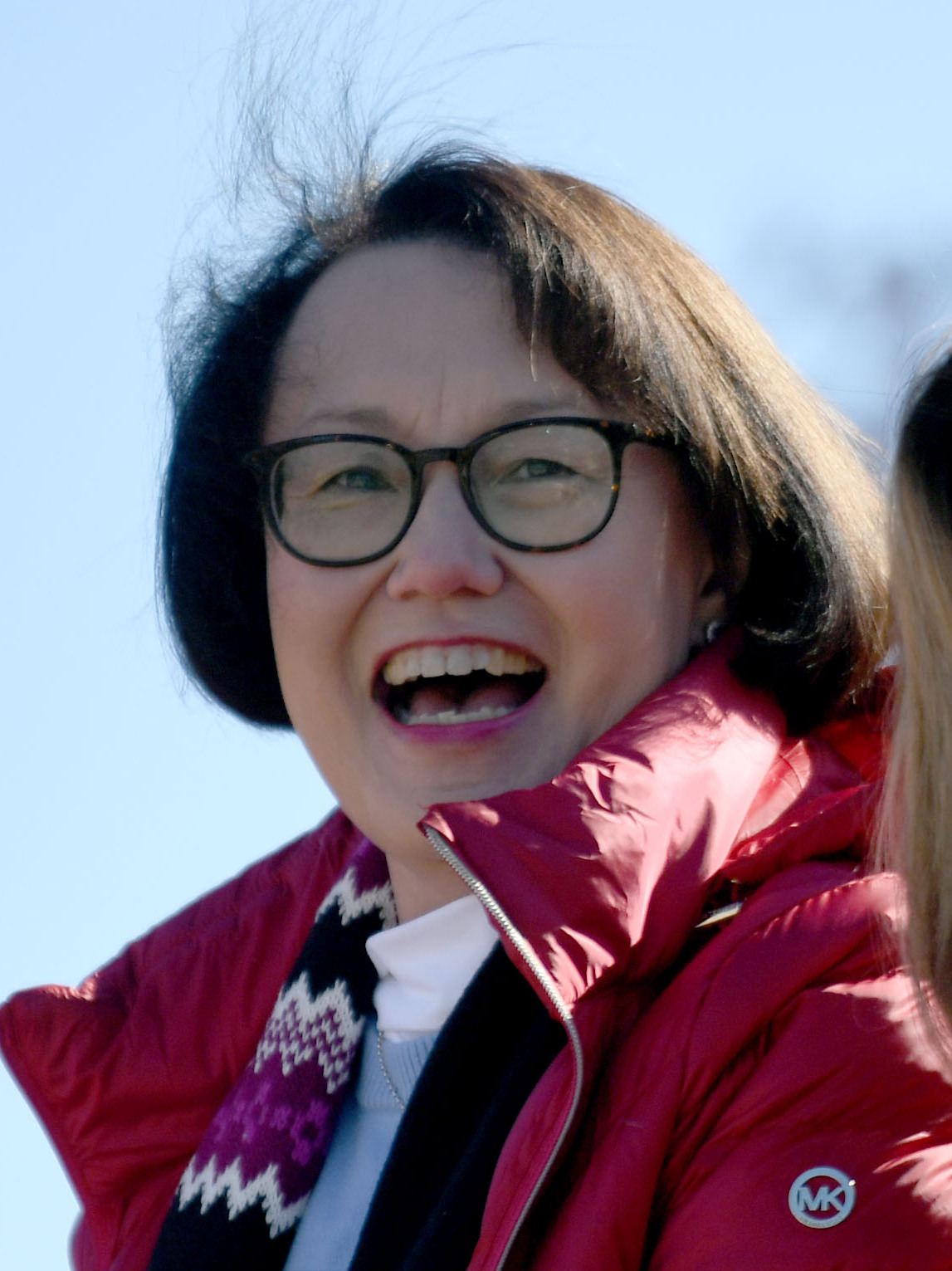
- Bartlett in 2025

Mayor of Madison, Alabama
- Incumbent
- Assumed office November 3, 2025
- Preceded by: Paul Finley

Member of the Madison City Council for the 5th district
- In office November 2, 2020 – November 3, 2025
- Succeeded by: Alice Lessmann

Personal details
- Born: Chuncheon, South Korea
- Education: University of Central Arkansas (BS); University of Arkansas (JD)

Ranae Bartlett is an American politician who has served as the mayor of Madison, Alabama, since 2025. She previously served on the Madison City Council from 2020 to 2025. She is noted as the state's first Asian-American mayor.

== Early life and education ==
Bartlett was born in Chuncheon, South Korea, to Mi Ja Kim and U.S. Air Force member Chester Bartlett. When she was four years old, she and her family moved to the Ozarks region of Arkansas. She attended the University of Arkansas School of Law, earning a Juris Doctor degree. She moved to Madison in 2003.

== Career ==
Bartlett was appointed to the Madison Board of Education in 2010. She served as the president from 2017 to 2020, after which she retired to run for city council. She was elected to the city council, representing district 5. She also worked as the executive director for the United States Chess Federation.

=== Mayor of Madison ===
==== 2025 election ====
After incumbent mayor Paul Finley announced that he would not be seeking re-election, Bartlett announced that she would be running for the position on March 6, 2025. In her campaign, she focused on cooperation with businesses and addressing issues posed by the growth of the city. She defeated two other opponents on August 26, with 56% of the vote, avoiding a runoff election.

==== Tenure ====
Speaking with WAFF prior to being sworn in, Bartlett stated that her first priorities would be ensuring Madison City Schools received proper funding, as well as addressing traffic and infrastructure issues. She was sworn in on November 3, 2025.
