= 2014 local electoral calendar =

Worldwide local elections held in 2014

This local electoral calendar for 2014 lists the subnational elections held in 2014. Referendums, retention elections, and national by-elections (special elections) are also included.

== January ==
- 7 January: Israel, Regional Head (2nd phase 2nd round)
- 10–11 January: Czech Republic, Zlín district 80, Senate by-election (1st round)
- 11 January: Nigeria, Anambra, Local Government Councils and Chairmen
- 14 January: Tuvalu, Nanumanga, Parliament by-election
- 17–18 January: Czech Republic, Zlín district 80, Senate by-election (2nd round)
- 18 January:
  - Maldives, City Councils, Atoll Councils and Island Councils (1st round)
  - Nigeria, Jigawa, Local Government Councils and Chairmen
- 23 January:
  - Pakistan, NA-69, National Assembly by-election
  - United Kingdom, Scotland, Cowdenbeath, Scottish Parliament by-election
- 26 January: Bangladesh, Narayanganj-5, House of the Nation by-election

== February ==
- 1 February: United States, New Orleans, Mayor and City Council (1st round)
- 2 February:
  - Japan, Nagasaki, Governor
  - Moldova, Gagauzia, Referendums on Self-Determination and Joining the EACU or EU
- 8 February: Australia, Griffith, House of Representatives by-election
- 9 February:
  - Japan, Tokyo, Governor
  - Switzerland
    - Basel-Landschaft, referendum
    - Basel-Stadt, referendums
    - Bern, referendum
    - Fribourg, referendums
    - Geneva, referendums
    - Glarus, Executive Council
    - Grisons, referendum
    - Lucerne, referendum
    - Solothurn, referendum
    - Ticino, referendum
    - Uri, referendum
    - Zürich, referendum
      - Zürich City, Council
- 11 February: United States, San Diego, Mayor special election (2nd round)
- 13 February: United Kingdom, Wythenshawe and Sale East, House of Commons by-election
- 15 February: Maldives, City Councils, Atoll Councils and Island Councils (2nd round)
- 16 February: Italy, Sardinia, Regional Council
- 19 February:
  - Bangladesh, Sub-district Councils (1st phase)
  - Cook Islands, Murienua, Parliament by-election
- 20 February: Bangladesh, Rangpur-6, House of the Nation by-election
- 23 February:
  - Ecuador, Provincial Prefects, Mayors, Municipal Councils and Parish Boards
  - Japan, Yamaguchi, Governor
  - Kosovo, North Kosovo, North Mitrovica, Mayor
- 24 February: India, Meghalaya
  - Jaintia Hills Autonomous District, Council
  - Khasi Hills Autonomous District, Council
- 25 February:
  - Nigeria, Plateau, Local Government Councils and Chairmen
  - Zambia, Katuba, Parliament by-election
- 27 February: Bangladesh, Sub-district Councils (2nd phase)

== March ==
- 2 March: Nicaragua
    - North Caribbean Coast Autonomous Region, Regional Council
    - South Caribbean Coast Autonomous Region, Regional Council
- 4 March: United States, Oklahoma City, Mayor
- 5 March:
  - Indonesia, Padang, Mayor (2nd round)
  - Jersey, Saint Helier No. 1 and 2, Parliament by-elections
- 9 March:
  - Austria, Salzburg, Mayors (1st round) and Municipal Councils
  - Switzerland, Obwalden, Executive Council and Cantonal Council
- 11 March: United States, Florida's 13th congressional district, U.S. House of Representatives special election
- 15 March:
  - Australia
    - South Australia, House of Assembly and Legislative Council
    - Tasmania, House of Assembly
  - Bangladesh, Sub-district Councils (3rd phase)
  - United States, New Orleans, City Council (2nd round)
- 16 March:
  - Germany, Bavaria, District Presidents, District Councils, Mayors and Municipal Councils (1st round)
    - Munich, Lord Mayor (1st round), City Council and Borough Councils
    - Nuremberg, Mayor and City Council
  - Japan, Ishikawa, Governor
  - Serbia, Belgrade, City Assembly
  - Tanzania, Kalenga, Parliament by-election
- 18 March: Switzerland, Appenzell Ausserrhoden, referendum
- 19 March: Netherlands, Municipal Councils
- 22 March: Nigeria, Nasarawa, Local Government Councils and Chairmen
- 23 March:
  - Austria, Salzburg, Mayors (2nd round)
  - Bangladesh, Sub-district Councils (4th phase)
  - Belarus, Regional Councils, District Councils and Municipal Councils
  - France
    - Municipal Councils (1st round)
    - Marseille, Municipal Council (1st round)
    - Paris, Council (1st round)
    - French Polynesia, Municipal Councils (1st round)
    - New Caledonia, Municipal Councils (1st round)
    - Saint Pierre and Miquelon, Municipal Council
  - Japan, Osaka, Mayor
  - Switzerland, Nidwalden, Executive Council and Landrat
- 29 March:
  - Bangladesh, Tangail-8, House of the Nation by-election
  - Sri Lanka, Southern and Western, Provincial Councils
- 30 March:
  - France
    - Municipal Councils (2nd round)
    - Marseille, Municipal Council (2nd round)
    - Paris, Council (2nd round)
    - French Polynesia, Municipal Councils (2nd round)
    - New Caledonia, Municipal Councils (2nd round)
  - Germany, Bavaria, District Presidents and Mayors (2nd round)
    - Munich, Lord Mayor (2nd round)
  - India, Andhra Pradesh, Municipal Corporations and Municipal Councils
  - Switzerland, Bern, Executive Council and Grand Council
    - Bernese Jura, Council
  - Turkey, Mayors and Municipal Councils
    - Istanbul, Mayor
- 31 March:
  - Bangladesh, Sub-district Councils (5th phase)
  - China, Wukan, Village Chief and Village Committee

== April ==
- 1 April:United States, Anchorage, Assembly
- 5 April:
  - Afghanistan, Provincial Councils
  - Australia, Western Australia, Australian Senate (revote)
  - Nigeria, Ilaje–Ese Odo, House of Representatives by-election
- 6 April:
  - India, Andhra Pradesh, District Councils and Township Councils
  - Japan, Kyoto, Governor
  - Russia, Novosibirsk, Mayor special election
  - Tanzania, Chalinze, Parliament by-election
- 7 April: Canada, Quebec, National Assembly
- 8 April: United States, Long Beach, Mayor and City Council (1st round)
- 9 April:
  - India, Arunachal Pradesh, Legislative Assembly
  - Indonesia, Lampung, Governor
- 10 April: India, Odisha, Legislative Assembly (1st phase)
- 12 April: India, Sikkim, Legislative Assembly
- 16 April: Bangladesh, Tangail-8, House of the Nation by-election (revote in 1 constituency)
- 17 April: India, Odisha, Legislative Assembly (2nd phase)
- 19 April: Libya, Municipal Councils (1st phase)
- 26 April: Libya, Municipal Councils (2nd phase)
- 27 April:
  - Japan, Kagoshima 2nd district, House of Representatives by-election
  - Switzerland, Appenzell Innerrhoden, Landsgemeinde
- 30 April:
  - India, Telangana, Legislative Assembly
  - Iraq, Kurdistan Region, Provincial Councils

== May ==
- 3 May:
  - Australia, Tasmania, (Huon and Rosevears) Legislative Council
  - Libya, Municipal Councils (3rd phase)
- 4 May:
  - Panama, Mayors and Municipal Councils
  - Switzerland, Glarus, Landsgemeinde
- 6 May:
  - Canada, Nunatsiavut, Assembly
  - Pakistan, NA-202, National Assembly by-election
- 7 May:
  - India, Andhra Pradesh, Legislative Assembly
  - South Africa, Provincial Legislatures
- 10 May:
  - Libya, Municipal Councils (4th phase)
  - United States, Arlington, City Council
- 11 May: New Caledonia, Provincial Assemblies
- 12 May: Pakistan, NA-46, National Assembly by-election
- 14–20 May: France, Consular Advisors and Consular Delegates (online vote)
- 17 May: Nigeria, Kano, Local Government Councils and Chairmen
- 18 May:
  - Greece, Regional Councils and Municipal Councils (1st round)
  - Switzerland
    - Aargau, referendum
    - Basel-Landschaft, referendums
    - Basel-Stadt, referendums
    - Bern, referendums
    - Geneva, referendums
    - Glarus, Council of States by-election
    - Grisons, Executive Council and Grand Council (1st round)
    - Lucerne, referendum
    - Neuchâtel, referendums
    - Schaffhausen, referendum
    - Solothurn, referendums
    - St. Gallen, referendums
    - Ticino, referendums
    - Vaud, referendum
    - Zürich, referendums
- 19 May: Bangladesh, Sub-district Councils (6th phase)
- 20 May:
  - Malawi, Local Councils
  - United States
    - Arkansas, Supreme Court
    - Idaho, Supreme Court
    - Portland, City Commission
- 22 May:
  - Tonga, Niuas Nobles' constituency, Parliament by-election
  - Uganda, Luweero, Parliament by-election
  - United Kingdom
    - England, Metropolitan Borough Councils, Unitary Authorities, District Councils and Mayors
      - Birmingham, City Council
      - Leeds, City Council
      - Liverpool, City Council
      - London, Mayors and Borough Councils
      - Manchester, City Council
    - Northern Ireland, District Councils
- 23 May: Ireland
  - City and County Councils
  - Dublin West and Longford–Westmeath, Assembly by-elections
- 24–25 May: France, Consular Advisors and Consular Delegates (in-person vote)
- 25 May:
  - Belgium
    - Brussels-Capital Region, Brussels Parliament
    - Eastern Belgium, German-speaking Community Parliament
    - Flanders, Flemish Parliament
    - Wallonia, Walloon Parliament
  - France, Haute-Garonne's 3rd constituency, National Assembly by-election (1st round)
  - Germany
    - Baden-Württemberg, County Councils, Municipal Councils and Local Councils
      - Stuttgart Region, Regional Assembly
        - Stuttgart, City Council and Borough Councils
    - Berlin, Tempelhofer Feld referendum
    - Brandenburg, District Councils, Municipal Councils and Village Councils
    - Hamburg, Borough Assemblies
    - Lower Saxony, Hanover Region, President (1st round)
    - Mecklenburg-Vorpommern, County Councils and Municipal Councils
    - North Rhine-Westphalia, District Administrators, District Councils, Mayors and Municipal Councils (1st round)
      - Cologne, City Council and Borough Councils
      - Dortmund, Lord Mayor (1st round), City Council and Borough Councils
      - Duisburg, City Council and Borough Councils
      - Düsseldorf, Lord Mayor (1st round), City Council and Borough Councils
      - Essen, City Council and Borough Councils
    - Rhineland-Palatinate, County Councils, Mayors, Municipal Councils, Local Councils (1st round)
      - Palatinate District Association, District Council
    - Saarland, District Administrators, District Councils, Mayors and Municipal Councils
    - Saxony, District Councils, Municipal Councils and Local Councils
      - Dresden, City Council and Borough Councils
      - Leipzig, City Council and Borough Councils
    - Saxony-Anhalt, District Councils, Municipal Councils and Local Councils
    - Thuringia, County Councils, Mayors, Municipal Councils, Local Mayors and Local Councils
  - Greece, Regional Councils and Municipal Councils (2nd round)
  - Italy
    - Mayors and Municipal Councils (1st round)
    - Abruzzo, Regional Council
    - Piedmont, Regional Council
  - Malaysia, Bukit Gelugor, House of Representatives by-election
  - Poland, Kraków, 2022 Olymopics, Bicycle Paths, CCTV and Metro referendums
  - Ukraine
    - Ivano-Frankivsk constituency No. 83, Parliament by-election
    - City Mayors, Town Mayors, Village Mayors, City Councils, Urban-District Councils, Town Councils and Village Councils (1st phase)
      - Kyiv, Mayor and City Council
- 29 May: Pakistan, Balochistan, Metropolitan Corporations, Municipal Corporations, Municipal Committees, District Councils and Unions Councils (2nd phase)
- 31 May:
  - Iceland, Municipal Councils
  - Malaysia, Teluk Intan, House of Representatives by-election

== June ==
- 1 June:
  - France, Haute-Garonne's 3rd constituency, National Assembly by-election (2nd round)
  - Switzerland, Glarus, Landrat
  - Turkey, Ağrı and Yalova, Mayors and Municipal Councils (revote)
- 3 June: United States
  - Fresno, City Council (1st round)
  - Long Beach, Mayor and City Council (2nd round)
  - Los Angeles County, Board of Supervisors (1st round)
  - Riverside County, Board of Supervisors
  - Sacramento, City Council (1st round)
  - San Bernardino County, Board of Supervisors (1st round)
  - San Diego County, Board of Supervisors
    - San Diego, City Council (1st round) and Referendums
  - Santa Clara County, Board of Supervisors
    - San Jose, Mayor and City Council (1st round)
- 4 June: South Korea, Governors, Provincial Councils, Mayors, Municipal Councils and School Boards
  - Busan, Mayor
  - Incheon, Mayor
  - Seoul, Mayor
- 5 June: United Kingdom, Newark, House of Commons by-election
- 8 June:
  - Germany, Rhineland-Palatinate, Mayors (2nd round)
  - Italy, Mayors and Municipal Councils (2nd round)
- 12 June: Canada, Ontario, Legislative Assembly
- 14 June: France, French Polynesia's 1st constituency, National Assembly by-election (1st round)
- 15 June:
  - Bangladesh, Barisal-5, House of the Nation by-election
  - Georgia, Mayors and Municipal Councils
  - Germany
    - Lower Saxony, Hanover Region, President (2nd round)
    - North Rhine-Westphalia, District Administrators and Mayors (2nd round)
      - Dortmund, Lord Mayor (2nd round)
      - Düsseldorf, Lord Mayor (2nd round)
  - Switzerland, Grisons, Grand Council (2nd round)
- 18 June: India, Uttarakhand, District Councils, Block Councils and Village Councils (1st phase)
- 21 June:
  - India, Uttarakhand, District Councils, Block Councils and Village Councils (2nd phase)
  - Nigeria, Ekiti, Governor
- 22 June: France, Nord's 21st constituency, National Assembly by-election (1st round)
- 23 June: Kenya, Bonchari, National Assembly by-election
- 24 June:
  - India, Uttarakhand, District Councils, Block Councils and Village Councils (3rd phase)
  - United States
    - Florida's 19th congressional district, U.S. House of Representatives special election
    - Tulsa, City Council (1st round)
- 26 June: Kuwait, Second District, Third District and Fourth District, National Assembly by-elections (5 seats)
- 28 June: France, French Polynesia's 1st constituency, National Assembly by-election (2nd round)
- 29 June:
  - France
    - Nord's 21st constituency, National Assembly by-election (2nd round)
    - Saint-Pierre-et-Miquelon's 1st constituency, National Assembly by-election
  - Northern Cyprus, Mayors, Municipal Councils, Village Heads and Village Councils
  - Senegal, Regional Councils, Mayors and Commune Councils
- 30 June: Canada, Fort McMurray—Athabasca, Macleod, Trinity—Spadina and Scarborough—Agincourt, House of Commons by-elections

== July ==
- 3–16 July: Germany, Bavaria, Free Choice of 8- or 9- Years of High School referendum
- 6 July:
  - Mexico, State elections
    - Coahuila, Congress
    - Nayarit, Congress, Mayors and Municipal Councils
  - Switzerland, Grisons, Grand Council (3rd round)
- 13 July: Japan, Shiga, Governor
- 15 July: India, Tripura, District Councils, Township Councils and Village Councils
- 30 July: South Korea, Busan Haeundae–Gijang 1, Daejeon Daedeok, Gwangju Gwangsan 2, Gyeonggi Gimpo, Gyeonggi Pyeongtaek 2, Gyeonggi Suwon 2, Gyeonggi Suwon 3, Gyeonggi Suwon 4, North Chungcheong Chungju, Seoul Dongjak 2, South Chungcheong Seosan–Taean, South Jeolla Damyang–Hampyeong–Yeonggwang–Jangseong, South Jeolla Naju–Hwasun, South Jeolla Suncheon–Gokseong and Ulsan Nam 2, National Assembly by-elections

== August ==
- 2 August: Nigeria, Katsina, Local Government Councils and Chairmen
- 5 August: United States
  - Michigan, Eliminate Commercial and Industrial Property Tax referendum
  - Missouri, Farmers' and Ranchers' Rights, Protect Electronic Data from Unreasonable Searches and Seizures, and Right to Bear Arms constitutional referendums
- 7 August: United States, Tennessee, Supreme Court, Court of Appeals and Court of Criminal Appeals retention elections
- 9 August:
  - Nigeria, Osun, Governor
  - United States, Honolulu, City Council (1st round)
- 10 August: Japan, Nagano, Governor
- 15 August: Samoa, Gagaʻifomauga, Parliament by-election
- 19 August:
  - United States, Alaska, Oil Tax Cuts Veto referendum
  - Zambia, Mangango, Parliament by-election
- 26 August: United States
  - Orange County, CA, Board of Supervisors (1st round)
  - Mesa, Mayor and City Council
  - Miami-Dade County, County Commission
- 29 August: Madagascar, Ambanja, Belo sur Tsiribihina, Marovoay and Sainte Marie, National Assembly by-elections
- 31 August:
  - Germany, Saxony, Parliament
  - Japan, Kagawa, Governor

== September ==
- 7 September: Poland, senatorial constituencies No. 47, 73 and 82, Senate by-elections
- 11 September: Zambia, Kasenengwa, Mkushi South, Solwezi Central, Vubwi and Zambezi West, Parliament by-elections
- 13 September: India, Mainpuri, Medak and Vadodara, House of the People by-elections
- 14 September:
  - Germany
    - Brandenburg, Parliament
    - Thuringia, Parliament
  - Russia, Federal Subject Heads, Federal Subject Legislatures, Municipal Heads, Municipal Councils, District Councils, Village Councils and Local referendums
    - Altai Krai, Governor
    - Altai Republic, Head and State Assembly
    - Astrakhan Oblast, Governor
    - Bashkortostan, President special election
    - Bryansk Oblast, Duma
    - Chelyabinsk Oblast, Governor special election
    - Crimea, State Council
    - Ivanovo Oblast, Governor special election
    - Kabardino-Balkaria, Parliament
    - Kalmykia, Head special election
    - Karachay-Cherkessia, People's Assembly
    - Khabarovsk Krai, Legislative Duma
    - Kirov Oblast, Governor
    - Komi Republic, Head
    - Krasnoyarsk Krai, Governor special election
    - Kurgan Oblast, Governor
    - Kursk Oblast, Governor special election
    - Lipetsk Oblast, Head of Administration special election
    - Mari El, State Assembly
    - Moscow, City Duma
    - Murmansk Oblast, Governor special election
    - Nenets Autonomous Okrug, Governor and Assembly of Deputies
    - Nizhny Novgorod Oblast, Governor special election
    - Novosibirsk Oblast, Governor special election
    - Orenburg Oblast, Governor special election
    - Oryol Oblast, Governor
    - Primorsky Krai, Governor special election
    - Pskov Oblast, Governor
    - Saint Petersburg, Governor special election
    - Sakha, Head special election
    - Samara Oblast, Governor special election
    - Sevastopol, Legislative Assembly
    - Stavropol Krai, Governor special election
    - Tatarstan, State Council
    - Tula Oblast, Duma
    - Tuva, Great Parliament
    - Tyumen Oblast, Governor special election
    - Udmurtia, Head
    - Volgograd Oblast, Governor special election and Duma
    - Vologda Oblast, Governor special election
    - Voronezh Oblast, Governor
  - Sweden, County Councils and Municipal Councils
- 18 September: United Kingdom, Scotland, Independence Referendum
- 19 September: Tuvalu, Nanumea, Parliament by-election
- 19–20 September: Czech Republic, Prague 10, Senate by-election (1st round)
- 20 September: Sri Lanka, Uva, Provincial Council
- 21 September: Austria, Vorarlberg, Parliament
- 22 September: Canada, New Brunswick, Legislative Assembly
- 26–27 September: Czech Republic, Prague 10, Senate by-election (2nd round)
- 28 September:
  - Republic of the Congo, Departmental Councils and Municipal Councils
  - Switzerland
    - Aargau, referendum
    - Basel-Landschaft, referendums
    - Basel-Stadt, referendums
    - Geneva, referendum
    - Grisons, referendum
    - Jura, referendum
    - Nidwalden, referendum
    - Obwalden, referendum
    - Schaffhausen, referendums
    - Solothurn, referendum
    - St. Gallen, referendums
    - Ticino, referendums
    - Uri, referendums
    - Zürich, referendum

== October ==
- 5 October:
  - Brazil, Governors (1st round) and Legislative Assemblies
  - Peru, Governors, Regional Councils, Mayors and Municipal Councils (1st round)
  - Slovenia, Mayors (1st round) and Municipal Councils
  - Switzerland, Zug, Executive Council and Cantonal Council
- 7 October: Malawi, Blantyre North and Thyolo East, Parliament by-elections
- 9 October: United Kingdom, Clacton and Heywood and Middleton, House of Commons by-elections
- 10 October: Ireland, Dublin South-West and Roscommon–South Leitrim, Assembly by-elections
- 10–11 October: Czech Republic, Municipal Councils
- 11 October: Nigeria, Adamawa, Governor by-election
- 12 October:
  - Bosnia and Herzegovina
    - Federation of Bosnia and Herzegovina, House of Representatives and Cantonal Assemblies
    - Republika Srpska, President and National Assembly
  - Hungary, Mayors, County Assemblies and Municipal Assemblies
    - Budapest, Mayor and Assembly
  - São Tomé and Príncipe, District Councils
    - Príncipe, Regional Assembly
- 14–28 October: Australia, Tasmania, Mayors, Deputy Mayors and Local Councils
- 15 October:
  - India
    - Beed and Kandhamal, House of the People by-elections
    - Haryana, Legislative Assembly
    - Maharashtra, Legislative Assembly
  - Mozambique, Governors and Provincial Assemblies
- 16 October: Pakistan, NA-149, National Assembly by-election
- 19 October: Slovenia, Mayors (2nd round)
- 20-26 October: Argentina, Misiones, Dam referendum
- 20 October – 7 November: Australia, South Australia, Mayors, District Councils, Regional Councils, City Councils, Town Councils and Aboriginal Councils
- 21 October: China, Laizhou, Pinglidian, Shizhulan, Village Committee (1st round)
- 22 October: Canada, Manitoba, Mayors, Municipal Councils and School Boards
- 23 October: Switzerland, Valais, referendum
- 24 October: Botswana, District Councils, City Councils and Town Councils
- 25 October: Nigeria, Delta, Local Authority Councils and Chairs
- 26 October:
  - Brazil, Governors (2nd round)
  - Japan, Fukushima, Governor
  - Serbia, National Minorities Councils
  - Ukraine, City Mayors, Town Mayors, Village Mayors, City Councils, Urban-District Councils, Town Councils and Village Councils (2nd phase)
- 27 October: Canada, Ontario, County Councils, Mayors, Regional Councils, Reeves, District Councils and School Boards
  - Toronto, Mayor, City Council and School Boards
- 30 October: United Kingdom, South Yorkshire Police and Crime Commissioner by-election

== November ==
- 3 November: Canada, Prince Edward Island, Mayors and Charlottetown City Council
- 4 November:
  - Federated States of Micronesia
    - Kosrae, Governor (1st round), Lieutenant Governor and State Legislature
    - Yap, Governor and State Legislature
  - Northern Mariana Islands, Mayors, Municipal Councils and Boards of Education
  - United States, Midterm elections
    - New Jersey's 1st congressional district, U.S. House of Representatives special election
    - North Carolina's 12th congressional district, U.S. House of Representatives special election
    - Virginia's 7th congressional district, U.S. House of Representatives special election
    - Hawaii, U.S. Senate special election
    - Oklahoma, U.S. Senate special election
    - South Carolina, U.S. Senate special election
    - Navajo Nation, Board of Education, Board of Election Supervisors and Council
    - Washington, D.C., Mayor, Attorney General and Council
    - Alabama
      - Governor, Lieutenant Governor, Attorney General, Auditor, Commissioner of Agriculture and Industries, Public Service Commission, Secretary of State and Treasurer
      - House of Representatives and Senate
      - Prohibit Recognition of Foreign Law and Laws Violating State Policies, Right to Bear Arms, Right to Hunt and Fish, and Two-Thirds State Legislature Majority to Increase Local Education Expenditures constitutional referendums
    - Alaska
      - Governor
      - House of Representatives and Senate
      - Supreme Court retention election
      - Legalize Marijuana, Minimum Wage and Protect Salmon from Mining referendums
    - Arizona
      - Governor, Attorney General, Corporation Commission, Mine Inspector, Secretary of State, Superintendent of Public Instruction and Treasurer
      - House of Representatives and Senate
      - Court of Appeals retention elections
      - Rejection of Unconstitutional Federal Actions constitutional referendum
    - Arkansas
      - Governor, Lieutenant Governor, Attorney General, Auditor, Commissioner of State Lands, Secretary of State and Treasurer
      - House of Representatives and Senate
      - Ballot Measure Signature Requirements, Extend Legislators' Term Limits and Restrict Lobbying and Campaign Finances, Legislative Review and Approval of Changes to State Agencies' Administrative Rules, and Statewide Legalization of Alcohol constitutional referendums and Minimum Wage referendum
    - California
      - Governor, Lieutenant Governor, Attorney General, Board of Equalization, Controller, Insurance Commissioner, Secretary of State, Superintendent of Public Instruction and Treasurer
      - Assembly and Senate
      - Supreme Court and Court of Appeals retention elections
      - Recategorize Nonviolent Offenses as Misdemeanors referendum
      - Bakersfield, City Council
      - Fresno, City Council (2nd round)
      - Los Angeles County, Board of Supervisors (2nd round)
      - Oakland, Mayor and City Council
      - Orange County, Board of Supervisors (2nd round)
      - Sacramento, City Council (2nd round)
      - San Bernardino County, Board of Supervisors (2nd round)
      - San Diego, City Council (2nd round)
      - San Francisco, Board of Supervisors
      - San Jose, Mayor and City Council (2nd round)
    - Colorado
      - Governor, Attorney General, Secretary of State and Treasurer
      - House of Representatives and Senate
      - Supreme Court and Court of Appeals retention elections
      - Abortion constitutional referendum, and Open School Board Meetings for Collective Bargaining and Genetically Modified Organisms Food Labels referendums
    - Connecticut
      - Governor, Attorney General, Comptroller, Secretary of the State and Treasurer
      - House of Representatives and Senate
      - Early Voting constitutional referendum
    - Delaware
      - Attorney General, Auditor and Treasurer
      - House of Representatives and Senate
    - Florida
      - Governor, Attorney General, Chief Financial Officer and Commissioner of Agriculture
      - House of Representatives and Senate
      - District Courts of Appeal retention elections
      - Medical Marijuana and Judicial Vacancies constitutional referendums
      - Broward County, Commission
    - Georgia
      - Governor, Lieutenant Governor, Attorney General, Commissioner of Agriculture, Commissioner of Insurance, Commissioner of Labor, Public Service Commission, Secretary of State and Superintendent of Schools
      - House of Representatives and Senate
    - Hawaii
      - Hawaii and Office of Hawaiian Affairs Board of Trustees
      - House of Representatives and Senate
      - Honolulu, City Council (2nd round)
    - Idaho
      - Governor, Lieutenant Governor, Attorney General, Controller, Secretary of State, Treasurer and Superintendent of Public Instruction
      - House of Representatives and Senate
      - Legislative Delegation of Rulemaking constitutional referendum
    - Illinois
      - Governor, Attorney General, Comptroller, Secretary of State and Treasurer
      - House of Representatives and Senate
      - Supreme Court and Appellate Court retention elections, and Appellate Court
      - Crime Victims' Rights and Right to Vote constitutional referendums
      - Cook County, Assessor, Board of Commissioners, Board of Commissioners President, Board of Review, Clerk, Sheriff, Treasurer and Water Reclamation District Board
    - Indiana
      - Auditor, Secretary of State and Treasurer
      - House of Representatives and Senate
      - Supreme Court and Court of Appeals retention elections
    - Iowa
      - Governor, Attorney General, Auditor, Secretary of Agriculture, Secretary of State and Treasurer
      - House of Representatives and Senate
      - Court of Appeals retention elections
    - Kansas
      - Governor, Attorney General, Commissioner of Insurance, Secretary of State and Treasurer
      - House of Representatives
      - Supreme Court and Court of Appeals retention elections
    - Kentucky
      - House of Representatives and Senate
      - Supreme Court and Court of Appeals
      - Louisville, Mayor and Metropolitan Council
    - Louisiana
      - Public Service Commission
    - Maine
      - Governor
      - House of Representatives and Senate
    - Maryland
      - Governor, Attorney General and Comptroller
      - House of Delegates and Senate
      - Court of Appeals and Court of Special Appeals retention elections
    - Massachusetts
      - Governor, Attorney General, Auditor, Governor's Council, Secretary of the Commonwealth and Treasurer
      - House of Representatives and Senate
      - Automatic Gas Tax Increase Repeal, Expansion of Bottle Deposits, Expansion of Gambling Prohibition and Paid Sick Days referendums
    - Michigan
      - Governor, Attorney General and Secretary of State
      - House of Representatives and Senate
      - Supreme Court
      - Wayne County, Executive and Commission
    - Minnesota
      - Governor, Attorney General, Auditor and Secretary of State
      - House of Representatives
      - Supreme Court
    - Mississippi
      - Right to Hunt and Fish constitutional referendum
    - Missouri
      - Auditor
      - House of Representatives and Senate
      - Supreme Court and Court of Appeals retention elections
      - Child Sexual Abuse Trials, Performance Evaluation for Teachers' Pay Raises and Six-Day Early Voting Period constitutional referendums
    - Montana
      - Public Service Commission
      - House of Representatives and Senate
      - Supreme Court
      - Late Voter Registration referendum
    - Nebraska
      - Governor, Attorney General, Auditor, Public Service Commission, Secretary of State and Treasurer
      - Legislature
      - Supreme Court and Court of Appeals retention elections
      - Minimum Wage referendum
    - Nevada
      - Governor, Lieutenant Governor, Attorney General, Controller, Secretary of State and Treasurer
      - Assembly and Senate
      - Supreme Court
      - Create an Intermediate Appellate Court and Removing Mining Tax Cap constitutional referendums
      - Clark County, County Commission
    - New Hampshire
      - Governor and Executive Council
      - House of Representatives and Senate
    - New Jersey
      - Pretrial Detention constitutional referendum
    - New Mexico
      - Governor, Attorney General, Auditor, Commissioner of Public Lands, Public Education Commission, Public Regulation Commission, Secretary of State and Treasurer
      - House of Representatives
      - Supreme Court and Court of Appeals retention elections, and Court of Appeals
      - Student on Board of Regents constitutional referendum
    - New York
      - Governor, Attorney General and Comptroller
      - Assembly and Senate
      - Redistricting Commission constitutional referendum
    - North Carolina
      - House of Representatives and Senate
      - Supreme Court and Court of Appeals
    - North Dakota
      - Agriculture Commissioner, Attorney General, Public Service Commission, Secretary of State and Tax Commissioner
      - House of Representatives and Senate
      - Abolish Elections for the Commission of Higher Education, Life Begins at Conception, Prohibit Mortgage or Sales or Transfer Taxes on Real Property, Require Voter Approval for Measures Estimated to have a Significant Fiscal Impact, and Use Oil Tax for Conservation constitutional referendums, and Parental Rights referendum
    - Ohio
      - Governor, Attorney General, Auditor, Secretary of State and Treasurer
      - House of Representatives and Senate
      - Supreme Court and District Courts of Appeal
    - Oklahoma
      - Governor, Lieutenant Governor, Attorney General, Auditor, Corporation Commissioner, Commissioner of Insurance, Commissioner of Labor, Superintendent of Public Instruction and Treasurer
      - House of Representatives and Senate
      - Supreme Court, Court of Criminal Appeals and Court of Civil Appeals retention elections
      - Tulsa, City Council (2nd round)
    - Oregon
      - Governor and Commissioner of Labor
      - House of Representatives and Senate
      - Allow Judges to Teach in Universities and Serve in the National Guard, Fund to Aid Post-Secondary Students and Outlaw Gender Discrimination constitutional referendums, and Driver's Licenses for Those Without Legal Residence, Labels for Genetically Engineered Foods, Legalize Marijuana and Open Top-Two Primary System referendums
    - Pennsylvania
      - Governor
      - House of Representatives and Senate
    - Rhode Island
      - Governor, Lieutenant Governor, Attorney General, Secretary of State and Treasurer
      - House of Representatives and Senate
      - Constitutional Convention referendum
    - South Carolina
      - Governor, Adjutant General, Attorney General, Commissioner of Agriculture, Comptroller, Secretary of State, Superintendent of Education and Treasurer
      - House of Representatives
      - Appointed Adjutant General constitutional referendum
    - South Dakota
      - Governor, Attorney General, Auditor, Commissioner of School and Public Lands, Public Utilities Commission, Secretary of State and Treasurer
      - House of Representatives and Senate
      - Supreme Court retention elections
      - Health Insurance Choice and Minimum Wage referendums
    - Tennessee
      - Governor
      - House of Representatives and Senate
      - Abortion, Appointment of Judges, Permit Lotteries and Prohibit State Payroll and Income Taxes constitutional referendums
    - Texas
      - Governor, Lieutenant Governor, Attorney General, Commissioner of Agriculture, Commissioner of the General Land Office, Comptroller and Railroad Commissioner
      - House of Representatives and Senate
      - Supreme Court, Court of Criminal Appeals and Courts of Appeals
      - Austin, Mayor and City Council (1st round)
      - Bexar County, Commissioners Court
      - Dallas County, Commissioners Court
      - Harris County, Commissioners Court
      - Tarrant County, Commissioners Court
    - Utah
      - Attorney General special election
      - House of Representatives and Senate
      - Supreme Court and Court of Appeals retention elections
    - Vermont
      - Governor, Lieutenant Governor, Attorney General, Auditor, Secretary of State and Treasurer
      - House of Representatives and Senate
    - Virginia
      - Virginia Beach, City Council
    - Washington
      - House of Representatives and Senate
      - Supreme Court
      - Gun Background Checks, Gun Confiscations and Class Size Reduction referendums
    - West Virginia
      - House of Delegates and Senate
    - Wisconsin
      - Governor, Attorney General, Secretary of State and Treasurer
      - Assembly and Senate
    - Wyoming
      - Governor, Auditor, Secretary of State, Superintendent of Public Instruction and Treasurer
      - House of Representatives and Senate
      - Supreme Court retention elections
    - American Samoa, House of Representatives and Constitutional Referendum
    - Guam, Governor, Attorney General, Consolidated Commission on Utilities, Education Board, Legislature, Supreme Court and Superior Court retention elections and Referendum
    - Northern Mariana Islands, Governor (1st round), Attorney General, House of Representatives, Senate, Supreme Court retention elections and Constitutional Referendum
    - U.S. Virgin Islands, Governor (1st round), Board of Elections, Legislature and Referendums
- 9 November: Spain, Catalonia, Self-Determination referendum
- 11 November: Cook Islands, Mitiaro, Parliament by-election
- 14 November: China, Laizhou, Pinglidian, Shizhulan, Village Committee (2nd round)
- 15 November:
  - Canada, British Columbia, Mayors and Municipal Councils
    - Vancouver, Mayor, Park Board, School Board and City Council
  - Slovakia, City Mayors, City Councils, Municipal Mayors and Municipal Councils
- 16 November:
  - Japan
    - Ehime, Governor
    - Okinawa, Governor
  - Poland, Provincial Assemblies, County Councils, Commune Councils and Commune Heads (1st round)
- 17 November: Canada, Whitby—Oshawa and Yellowhead, House of Commons by-elections
- 18 November:
  - Bermuda, Sandys South, House of Assembly by-election
  - Saint Helena, Ascension and Tristan da Cunha, Ascension Island, Council by-election
  - Northern Mariana Islands, Governor (2nd round)
  - U.S. Virgin Islands, Governor (2nd round)
- 20 November:
  - Uganda, Amuru, Parliament by-election
  - United Kingdom, Rochester and Strood, House of Commons by-election
- 22 November:
  - Bahrain, Municipal Councils (1st round)
  - Guernsey, Alderney, Parliament
  - India, Rajasthan, Municipal Corporations, Municipal Councils and Town Councils
- 23 November:
  - Hungary, Budapest 11, National Assembly by-election
  - Italy
    - Calabria, Regional Council
    - Emilia-Romagna, Regional Council
  - Turkmenistan, Regional Councils and District Councils
- 25 November: India
  - Jammu and Kashmir, Legislative Assembly (1st phase)
  - Jharkhand, Legislative Assembly (1st phase)
- 26 November: India, Rajasthan, Municipal Chairs
- 27 November: India, Rajasthan, Municipal Deputy Chairs
- 28 November: India, Madhya Pradesh, Municipal Corporations, Municipal Councils and Town Councils (1st phase)
- 29 November:
  - Australia, Victoria, Legislative Assembly and Legislative Council
  - Bahrain, Municipal Councils (2nd round)
  - Jordan, Irbid's 2nd district, House of Representatives by-election
  - Taiwan, County Magistrates, County Councils, Township Mayors, Township Councils, Municipal Mayors, Municipal Councils, Borough Chiefs, Indigenous District Chiefs and Indigenous District Councillors
- 30 November:
  - Japan, Wakayama, Governor
  - Poland, Commune Heads (2nd round)
  - San Marino, Mayors and Municipal Councils
  - Switzerland
    - Appenzell Ausserrhoden, referendum
    - Basel-Stadt, referendum
    - Geneva, referendums
    - Grisons, referendum
    - Lucerne, referendum
    - Neuchâtel, referendums
    - Obwalden, referendum
    - Schaffhausen, referendums
    - Schwyz, referendums
    - Solothurn, referendums
    - St. Gallen, referendums
    - Zürich, referendums

== December ==
- 1 December: Jamaica, Westmoreland Central, House of Representatives by-election
- 2 December: India
  - Jammu and Kashmir, Legislative Assembly (2nd phase)
  - Jharkhand, Legislative Assembly (2nd phase)
  - Madhya Pradesh, Municipal Corporations, Municipal Councils and Town Councils (2nd phase)
- 6 December: United States, Louisiana
  - U.S. Senate (2nd round)
  - Louisiana's 5th congressional district, U.S. House of Representatives (2nd round)
  - Louisiana's 6th congressional district, U.S. House of Representatives (2nd round)
- 7 December:
  - France, Aube's 3rd constituency, National Assembly by-election (1st round)
  - Peru, Governors, Regional Councils, Mayors and Municipal Councils (2nd round)
- 8 December: China, Laizhou, Pinglidian, Shizhulan, ~~Village Chief~~ (election nullified)
- 9 December: India
  - Jammu and Kashmir, Legislative Assembly (3rd phase)
  - Jharkhand, Legislative Assembly (3rd phase)
- 10 December: Guernsey, Sark, Parliament
- 13 December: China, Xinxiang, Yanjin, Wanshou, Beijie, Village Chief
- 14 December:
  - France, Aube's 3rd constituency, National Assembly by-election (2nd round)
  - India
    - Jammu and Kashmir, Legislative Assembly (4th phase)
    - Jharkhand, Legislative Assembly (4th phase)
  - Japan, Ibaraki, Prefectural Assembly
  - Tanzania, Municipal Councils and Street/Village Chairs
- 16 December: United States, Austin, Mayor and City Council (2nd round)
- 17 December: Sint Eustatius, Status referendum
- 20 December: India
  - Jammu and Kashmir, Legislative Assembly (5th phase)
  - Jharkhand, Legislative Assembly (5th phase)
- 21 December:
  - Japan, Miyazaki, Governor
  - Uzbekistan, Regional Councils, District Councils and City Councils (1st round)
- 23 December:
  - Azerbaijan, Municipal Councils
  - Bangladesh, Sirajganj-3, House of the Nation by-election
- 27 December: Myanmar, Yangon, City Development Committee
- 31 December: Pakistan, Balochistan, Metropolitan Corporations, Municipal Corporations, Municipal Committees, District Councils and Unions Councils (3rd phase)
