= Senator Greiner =

Senator Greiner may refer to:

- Jon Greiner (born 1951), Utah State Senate
- Sandy Greiner (born 1945), Iowa State Senate
- William P. Greiner (fl. 1910s–1930s), New York State Senate
