= 2014 Utah Senate election =

- November 4, 2014

14 out of 29 seats in the Utah State Senate 15 seats needed for a majority
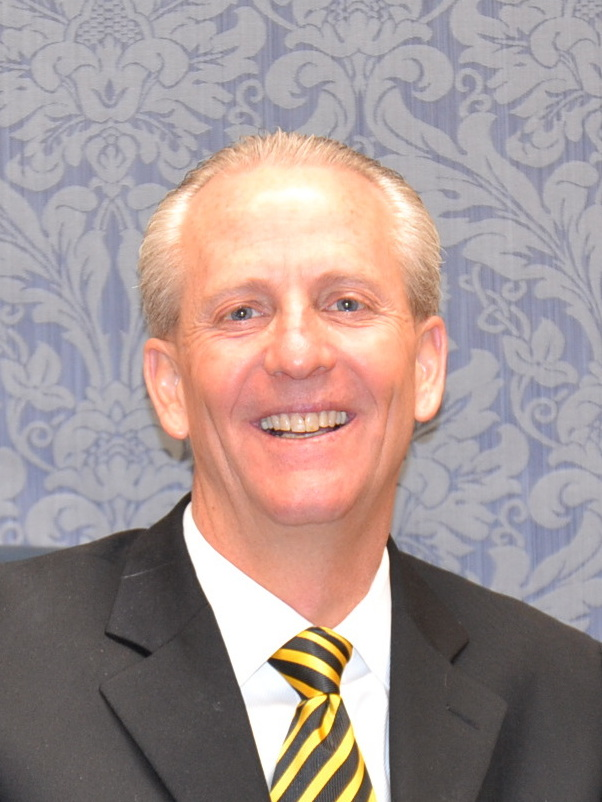

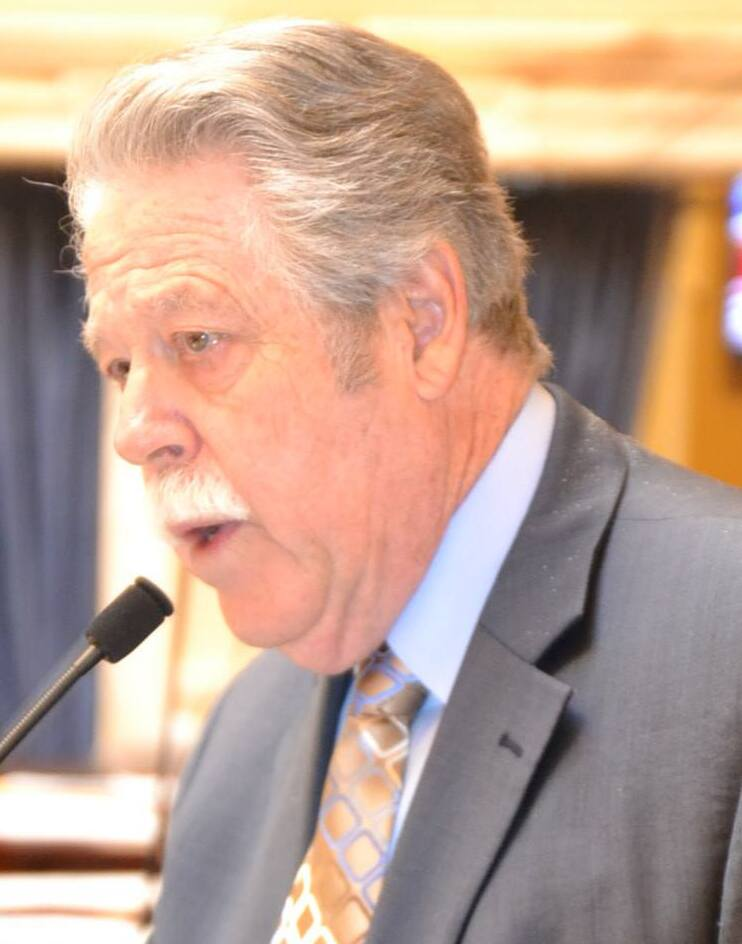
	Majority party	Minority party
Leader	Wayne L. Niederhauser	Gene Davis
Party	Republican	Democratic
Leader since	January 28, 2013	January 28, 2013
Leader's seat	District 9	District 3
Last election	24	5
Seats after	24	5
Seat change	Steady	Steady
Popular vote	154,114	106,888
Percentage	58.25%	40.40%
President of the Senate before election
Wayne L. Niederhauser
Republican
Elected President of the Senate
Wayne L. Niederhauser
Republican

The 2014 Utah Senate election was held on November 4, 2014, to determine which party would control the Utah State Senate for the following two years in the 61st Utah State Legislature. Fourteen out of the 29 seats in the Utah State Senate were up for election and the primary was held on June 24, 2014. Prior to the election, 24 seats were held by Republicans and 5 seats were held by Democrats. The general election saw neither party gain nor lose any seats, thereby meaning that Republicans retained their majority in the State Senate.

== Predictions ==
Source	Ranking	As of
Governing	Safe R	October 20, 2014

== Retirements ==
=== Democrats ===
1. District 4: Patricia W. Jones retired.

=== Republicans ===
1. District 18: Stuart Reid retired.

== Results ==
=== District 2 ===
District 2 election, 2014
Party	Candidate	Votes	%
Democratic	Jim Dabakis (incumbent)	16,446	74.18%
Republican	Jacquie Nielson	5,724	25.82%
Total votes		22,170	100.0%
Democratic hold			

=== District 3 ===
District 3 election, 2014
Party	Candidate	Votes	%
Democratic	Gene Davis (incumbent)	12,961	100.0%
Total votes		12,961	100.0%
Democratic hold			

=== District 4 ===
District 4 election, 2014
Party	Candidate	Votes	%
Democratic	Jani Iwamoto	19,602	59.97%
Republican	Sabrina R. Petersen	13,084	40.03%
Total votes		32,686	100.0%
Democratic hold			

=== District 5 ===
District 5 election, 2014
Party	Candidate	Votes	%
Democratic	Karen Mayne (incumbent)	10,225	100.0%
Total votes		10,225	100.0%
Democratic hold			

=== District 9 ===
District 9 election, 2014
Party	Candidate	Votes	%
Republican	Wayne L. Niederhauser (incumbent)	15,822	61.41%
Democratic	Kathryn C. Gustafson	9,943	38.59%
Total votes		25,765	100.0%
Republican hold			

=== District 11 ===
District 11 election, 2014
Party	Candidate	Votes	%
Republican	Howard A. Stephenson (incumbent)	13,195	63.11%
Democratic	Michele Weeks	7,713	36.89%
Total votes		20,908	100.0%
Republican hold			

=== District 12 ===
District 12 election, 2014
Party	Candidate	Votes	%
Republican	Daniel Thatcher (incumbent)	8,548	58.76%
Democratic	Clare Collard	5,998	41.24%
Total votes		14,546	100.0%
Republican hold			

=== District 15 ===
District 15 election, 2014
Party	Candidate	Votes	%
Republican	Margaret Dayton (incumbent)	11,290	81.59%
Democratic	Emmanuel Kepas	2,548	18.41%
Total votes		13,838	100.0%
Republican hold			

=== District 17 ===
District 17 election, 2014
Party	Candidate	Votes	%
Republican	Peter C. Knudson (incumbent)	14,431	74.69%
Democratic	Scott Totman	2,949	15.27%
Constitution	Kirk D. Pearson	1,939	10.04%
Total votes		19,319	100.0%
Republican hold			

=== District 18 ===
District 18 election, 2014
Party	Candidate	Votes	%
Republican	Ann Millner	11,603	73.63%
Democratic	Mat Wenzel	4,155	26.37%
Total votes		15,758	100.0%
Republican hold			

=== District 21 ===
District 21 election, 2014
Party	Candidate	Votes	%
Republican	Jerry Stevenson (incumbent)	11,950	78.31%
Democratic	Sherri Tatton	3,309	21.69%
Total votes		15,259	100.0%
Republican hold			

=== District 22 ===
District 22 election, 2014
Party	Candidate	Votes	%
Republican	Stuart Adams (incumbent)	16,605	73.26%
Democratic	Kip Sayre	4,417	19.49%
Libertarian	Brent Zimmerman	1,643	7.25%
Total votes		22,665	100.0%
Republican hold			

=== District 26 ===
District 26 election, 2014
Party	Candidate	Votes	%
Republican	Kevin T. VanTassell (incumbent)	15,249	69.72%
Democratic	Wayne Stevens	6,622	30.28%
Total votes		21,871	100.0%
Republican hold			

=== District 28 ===
District 28 election, 2014
Party	Candidate	Votes	%
Republican	Evan Vickers (incumbent)	16,613	100.0%
Total votes		16,613	100.0%
Republican hold			
