= 2014 Montana judicial elections =

The 2014 Montana judicial elections featured two supreme court races, as well as several trial court races.

== Supreme Court (Rice seat) ==
Incumbent Justice James Rice was challenged by W. David Herbert, an attorney.

== Supreme Court (Wheat seat) ==
Incumbent Justice Michael E. Wheat was challenged by Lawrence VanDyke, solicitor general of Montana.

== Election Mail Controversy ==
Researchers at Stanford University and Dartmouth College sent election mailers to voters in Montana labeled the "2014 Montana General Election Voter Information Guide." The mailers contained the Montana state seal, and rated how liberal or conservative the four nonpartisan candidates are in the Supreme Court race. Secretary of State Linda McCulloch charged that the mailers were deceitful because they used the state seal without her office's authorization, and made it appear as if the mailers were authorized by her office.
