= 2014 Portland, Oregon, City Commission election =

The 2014 Portland City Commission elections were held on May 20, 2014. Both candidates won the election with over 50% of the vote avoiding a general election runoff.

2 positions were up for election, Position 2 and Position 3.

== Position 2 ==
2014 Portland, Oregon, City Commission election
- May 20, 2014
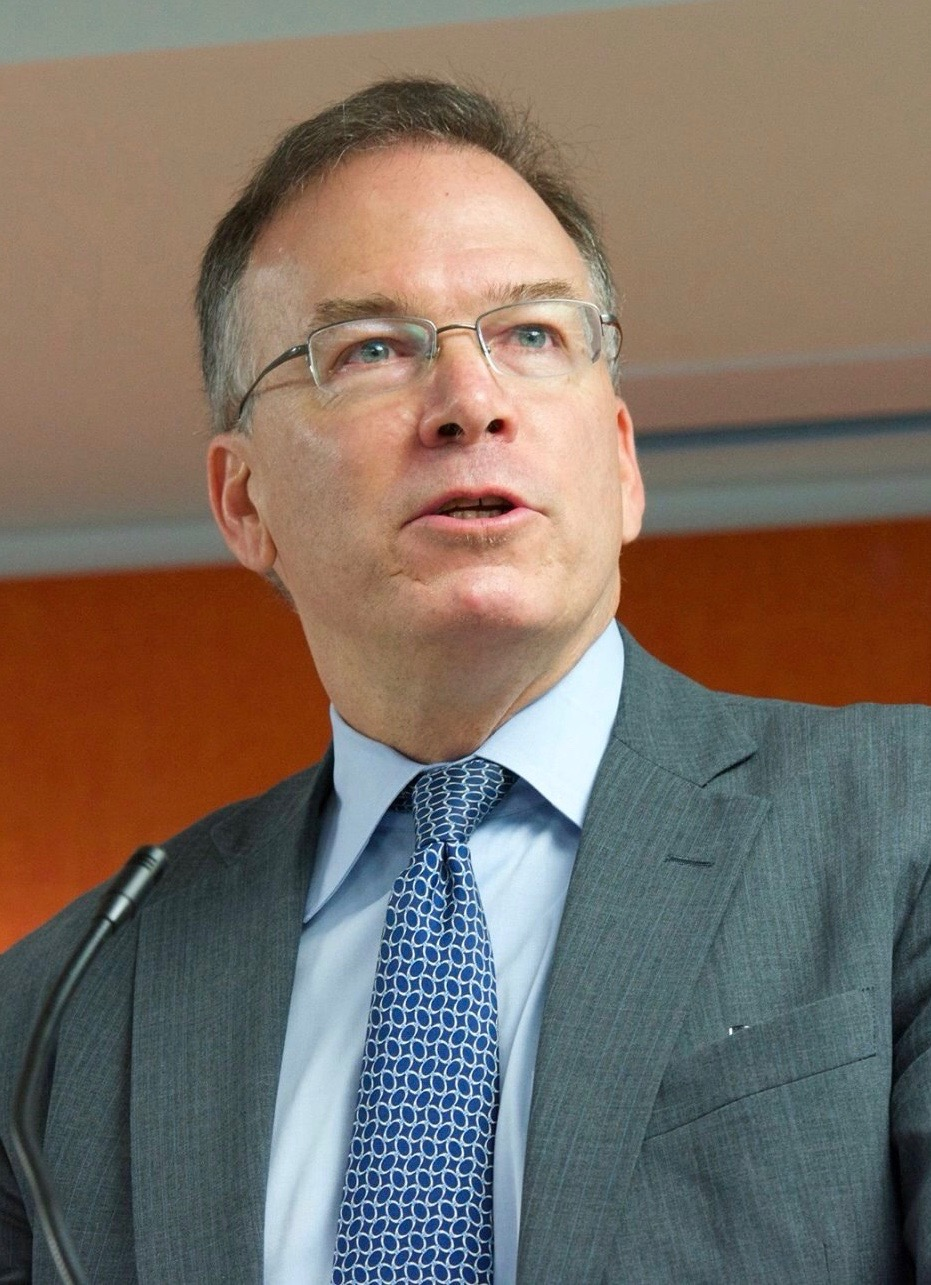

Nominee	Nick Fish	Sharon Y. Maxwell
Popular vote	71,141	18,207
Percentage	72.98%	18.68%
Commissioner before election
Nick Fish
Elected Commissioner
Nick Fish

Incumbent Nick Fish won the election outright with 73% of the vote, avoiding a general election.

Results
Party	Candidate	Votes	%
Nonpartisan	Nick Fish	71,141	72.98
Nonpartisan	Sharon Y. Maxwell	18,207	18.68
Nonpartisan	Michael W. Durrow	7,388	7.58
Write-in		749	0.77
Total votes		97,485	100

== Position 3 ==
2014 Portland, Oregon, City Commission election
- May 20, 2014
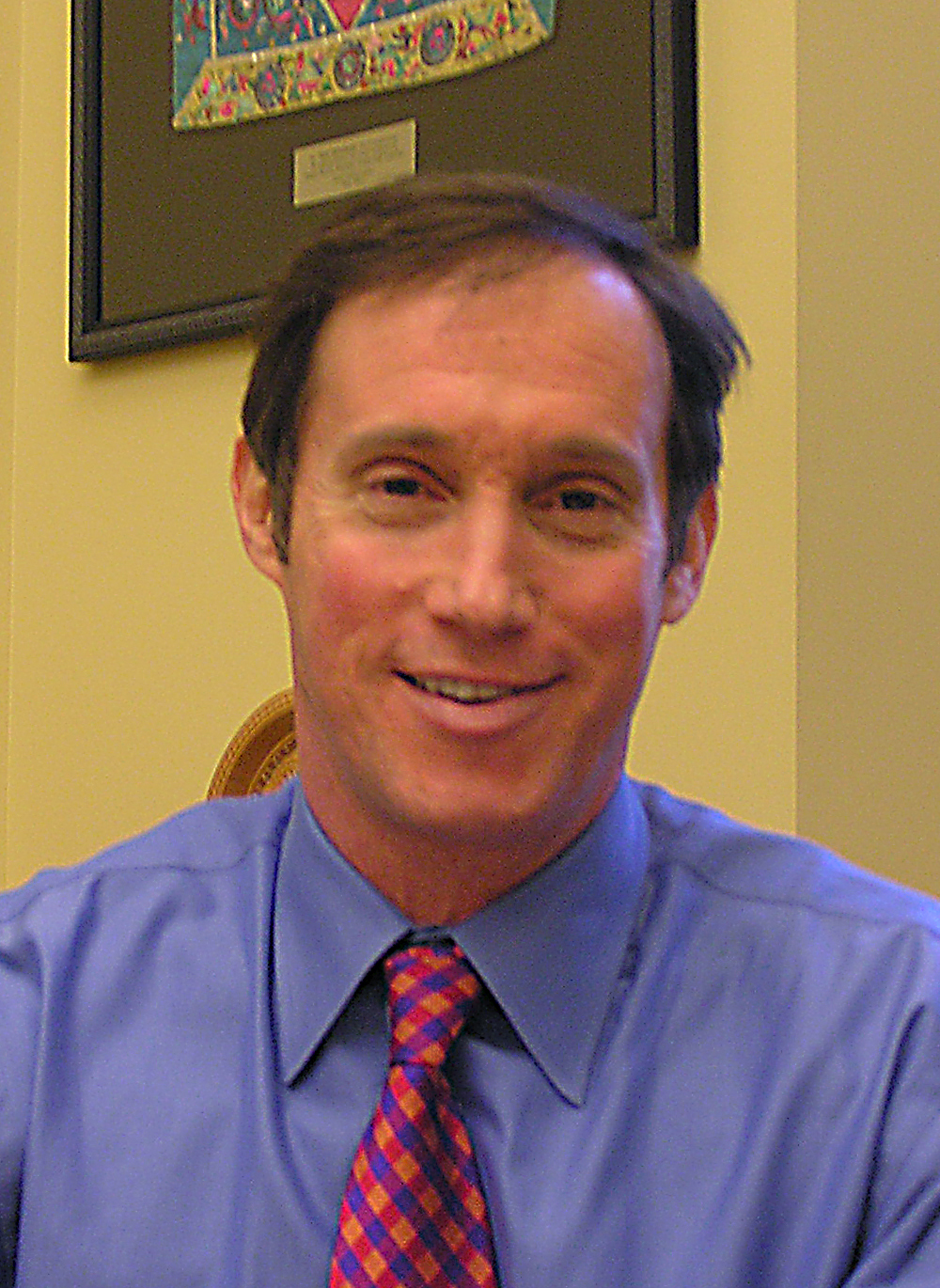

Nominee	Dan Saltzman	Nicholas Caleb
Popular vote	60,844	18,697
Percentage	63.06%	19.38%
Commissioner before election
Dan Saltzman
Elected Commissioner
Dan Saltzman

Incumbent Dan Saltzman won the election outright with over 63% of the vote, avoiding a general election.

Results
Party	Candidate	Votes	%
Nonpartisan	Dan Saltzman	60,844	63.06%
Nonpartisan	Nicholas Caleb	18,697	19.38%
Nonpartisan	Joe Meyer	10,228	10.60%
Nonpartisan	Leah Marie Dumas	6,125	6.35%
Write-in		596	0.62
Total votes		96,490	100
