= 2014 Tripura local elections =

Local election in India

On 15 July 2014 elections to local bodies were held in the Indian state of Tripura. The Tripura State Election Commission announced the election date on 28 April 2014. This was the fifth panchayat election since the introduction of directly elected panchayats in Tripura in 1994. The number of eligible voters stood at 1,108,190.

The Tripura State Election Commission announced the election to be held for 6,111 seats in a total of 591 gram panchayats (village councils), 419 seats in 35 panchayat samitis and 116 seats for 8 zilla parishad (district councils). There were 2,615 polling stations. In total 13,754 candidates were in the fray. Moreover, by-polls for 4 seats in urban bodies were also held. Candidates of the Communist Party of India (Marxist) were elected unopposed in 980 gram panchayat seats, 381 panchayat samiti seats and 2 zilla parishad seats. In 2 gram panchayat seats elections were postponed due to death of candidates. In two gram panchayats, in Bishalgarh and Kadamtala, election was postponed for a day due to misprinting of ballot papers.

Fifty percent of the seats in Tripura local elections are reserved for women. The quota for women is a result of a law passed by the Tripura Legislative Assembly in 2010. Another novelty for Tripura panchayat elections was the introduction of the 'None of the Above' (NOTA) option on the ballot papers.

Ahead of the polls, the Tripura State Election Commission requested that the government in Delhi would deploy forty paramilitary companies to ensure that the elections could be held peacefully. The Tripura state government pledged to provide more than 12,000 security personnel for the polls. Voting began at 07.00 IST. More than 85% of the eligible voters had cast their votes. Polling was largely peaceful, with sporadic incident of scuffles between sympathizers of different parties reported. Counting of the votes began at 44 counting halls on 18 July 2014. The counting was conducted with protection from Central Paramilitary Forces.

The results were declared on 19 July 2014. The CPI(M)-led Left Front won the majority of seats in 563 of the 591 gram panchayats (compared to 414 gram panchayats in 2009). The Left Front won a majority of seats in each of the panchayat samitis and zilla parishads. The Indian National Congress won a majority of seats in 18 gram panchayats. The Bharatiya Janata Party won five gram panchayats and the All India Trinamool Congress three. Commenting on the election victory, Chief Minister Manik Sarkar stated that "Through this verdict the people of Tripura have demonstrated and reiterated their faith and confidence in the Left Front government."
