= 2014 United States Virgin Islands referendum =

- 7 November 2000

Are you in favor of the United States Congress amending Section 6(1) of the revised Organic Act of 1954 to increase the term of office of local Senators from two years to four years?
For	17.60%
Against	82.40%

Should the Legislature of the Virgin Islands consider legislation to allow for the cultivation and use of cannabis (commonly known as marijuana) for medical and research purposes?
For	56.54%
Against	43.46%

A two-part referendum was held in the United States Virgin Islands on 4 November 2014. Voters were asked whether they approve of extending the term of office of Senators from two to four years, and whether the cultivation and use of cannabis for medical and research purposes should be allowed.

The proposal to increase senatorial terms was rejected by 82% of voters, while the medical cannabis proposal was approved by 57% of voters.

== Background ==
The proposal to hold a referendum on increasing the term length of Senators was approved by the Legislature on 27 September 2014 by a vote of 7–6 with one abstention. The proposal would only be implemented if a majority of those voting in the simultaneous general elections.

In 2012 Senator Terrance Nelson proposed holding referendums on the use of medical cannabis and allowing the production, processing, manufacturing and distributing of industrial hemp. Although the holding of a referendum on medical cannabis referendum was blocked by the Legislature, it did allow a referendum on industrial hemp, which was approved by 57% of voters. Nelson again proposed holding a referendum on medical cannabis in 2014, and this time it was approved by a vote of 12–2. Unlike the term length question, the cannabis one was non-binding.

== Results ==
=== Increasing Senators' term length ===
Choice	Votes	%
For	3,192	17.60
Against	14,946	82.40
Invalid/blank votes	9,741	–
Total	27,879	100
Registered voters/turnout	51,326	54.32
Source: VI Vote

=== Medical cannabis ===
Choice	Votes	%
For	10,503	56.54
Against	8,074	43.46
Invalid/blank votes	9,302	–
Total	27,879	100
Registered voters/turnout	51,326	54.32
Source: VI Vote
