= Jon Greiner =

American politician and police chief

Jon J. Greiner

Member of the Utah Senate from the 18th district
- In office 2006–2010

Personal details
- Born: Jon Jay Greiner; July 6, 1951 (age 75)
- Party: Republican
- Spouse: Telitha

Jon Jay Greiner (born July 6, 1951) is an American politician and former police chief from Utah. A Republican, he was a member of the Utah State Senate, representing the state's 18th senate district in Davis, and Weber Counties including the city of Ogden.

Greiner is a graduate of both Weber State University and Utah State University. He has also served on the Board of Trustees of Weber State University.

On December 28, 2011 Greiner was fired as Ogden City Police Chief. City officials commented, "Greiner’s termination was unwanted and involuntary on the part of the city, but was required by the Federal Merit Systems Protection Board, pursuant to the Hatch Act."
