= 2014 Indiana House of Representatives election =

Election for all 100 seats of the Indiana House of Representatives

- November 4, 2014

All 100 seats in the Indiana House of Representatives 51 seats needed for a majority
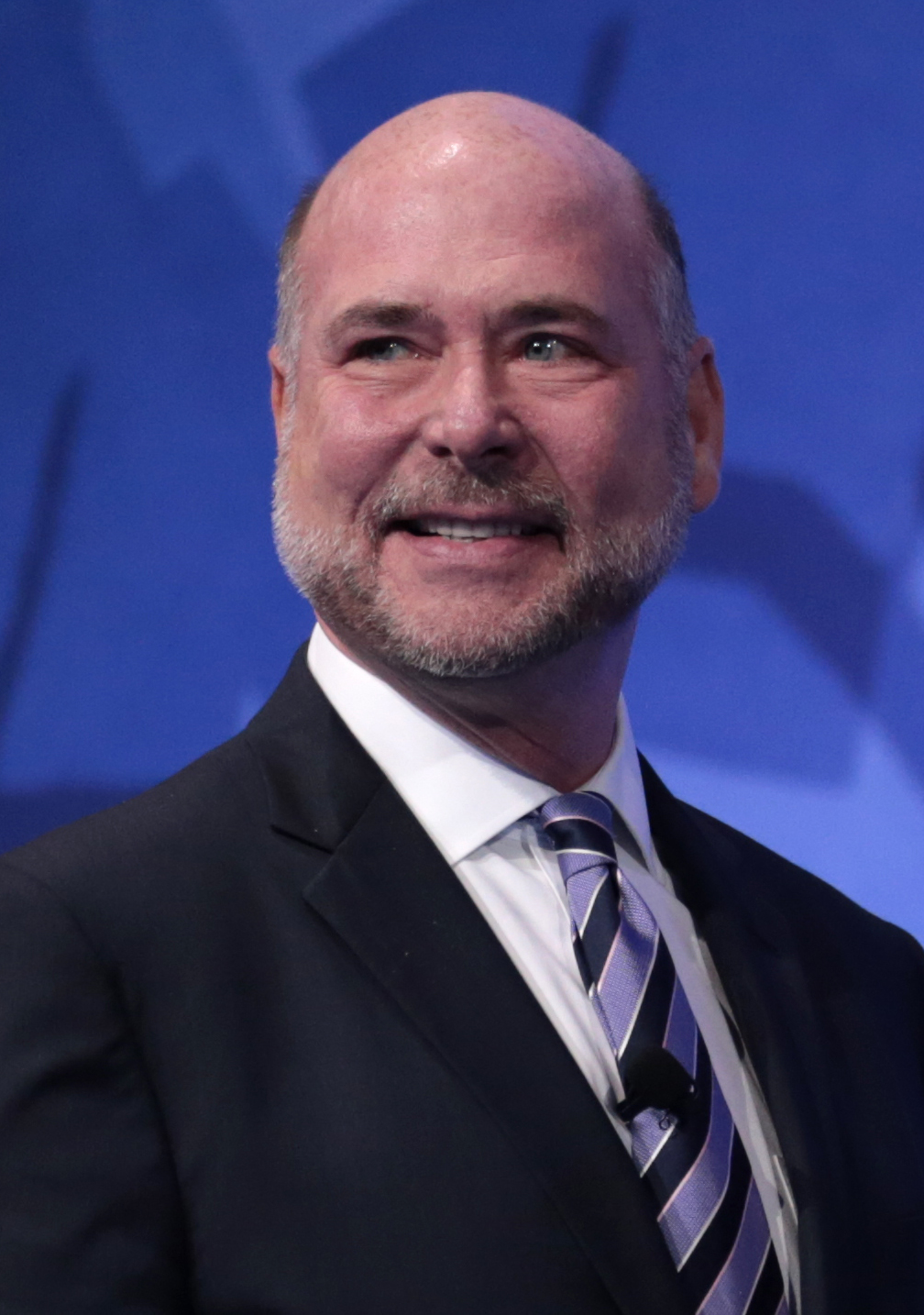
	Majority party	Minority party
Leader	Brian Bosma	Scott Pelath
Party	Republican	Democratic
Leader's seat	88th district	9th district
Last election	69	31
Seats won	71	29
Seat change	▲2	▼2
Popular vote	760,554	432,568
Percentage	62.91%	35.78%
Speaker before election
Brian Bosma
Republican
Elected Speaker
Brian Bosma
Republican

The 2014 Indiana House of Representatives election was held on November 4, 2014, to elect all 100 members of the Indiana House of Representatives. The Republican Party increased its majority from 69 to 71 seats. The Democratic Party won the remaining 29 seats, down from 31. Republicans continued to hold more than two-thirds of the chamber.

Four districts changed party control. Republicans defeated Democratic incumbents in Districts 12 and 19, and won District 45, which had been held by a Democrat. Democrat Melanie Wright defeated Republican incumbent L. Jack Lutz in District 35. Republicans gained three districts and lost one, for a net gain of two seats.

The primary elections took place on May 6, and the major-party candidate filing deadline was February 7.

== Background ==
Republicans held 69 of the 100 House seats going into the election. Democrats held 31. With every seat up for election, the Republicans needed to retain at least 51 seats to keep their majority. Brian Bosma was the Republican House leader and Speaker, while Scott Pelath led the Democratic caucus.

Three Republican representatives, Rick Niemeyer (District 11), Timothy Neese (District 48) and Mark Messmer (District 63), did not seek another House term. Two other seats changed occupants before November: Bionca Gambill succeeded Kreg Battles in District 45, and Christopher Judy succeeded Kathy Heuer in District 83.

== Nominations and campaign ==
Major-party primaries were held on May 6. Nine sitting Republican representatives faced primary challengers. Rebecca Kubacki lost the District 22 Republican primary to Curt Nisly, and Kathy Heuer lost the District 83 Republican primary to Christopher Judy. Judy later succeeded Heuer in the House before the general election. The other seven challenged Republican incumbents won renomination.

The Republican primaries in Districts 11 and 48 also decided contests for seats whose sitting members were retiring from the House. Michael Aylesworth won the District 11 nomination, while Doug Miller won a three-way primary in District 48. Julie Olthoff won a two-candidate Republican primary in District 19 before defeating Democratic incumbent Shelli VanDenburgh in November.

In the compiled general-election returns, 56 districts had more than one candidate and 44 had only one candidate listed. In 50 districts both major parties fielded a candidate. Six districts were decided by fewer than ten percentage points.

== Aftermath ==
House Republicans selected Brian Bosma to remain Speaker at a caucus meeting on November 5. The Republican caucus also retained Kathy Kreag Richardson as caucus chair and chose Jud McMillin as floor leader. Democrats reelected Scott Pelath as their House leader at a meeting on November 6. The Democratic caucus selected John Bartlett as caucus chair, while Linda Lawson continued as minority floor leader.

== Results ==
The Republicans won 71 seats, compared with 29 for the Democrats. This was a net gain of two seats for the Republicans, leaving the party with a two-thirds supermajority in the House.

The statewide vote totals below are sums of votes cast for candidates in the 100 individual House elections. They were calculated from the county-level general-election data published by OpenElections. They are not an official statewide House vote total and should not be read as the number of voters who participated in the election. The 2012 figures used for changes in vote share were calculated from the corresponding 2012 county-level dataset. Differences between the two elections reflect both voter choices and which parties fielded candidates in each district.

=== Statewide summary ===
Party results for all 100 House districts
Party	Candidates	Votes	Vote share	Change in vote share vs. 2012 (pp)	Seats before	Seats won	Seat change
Republican	82	760,554	62.91%	▲6.34	69	71	▲2
Democratic	68	432,568	35.78%	▼6.33	31	29	▼2
Libertarian	9	14,905	1.23%	▲0.15	0	0	–
Independent	2	980	0.08%	▲0.08	0	0	–
Total	161	1,209,007	100.00%	–	100	100	–

The Republican share of House candidate votes increased from 56.57% in the compiled 2012 results to 62.91% in 2014. These percentages should not be interpreted as a uniform statewide electoral swing because several districts had no candidate from one of the two major parties.

=== Seats changing parties ===
Four districts changed hands: three went from Democratic to Republican control and one from Republican to Democratic control.

District	Previously held by	Winning party	Winning candidate	Runner-up	Margin (votes)	Result
12	Democratic	Republican	Bill Fine	Mara Candelaria Reardon	421	▲ Republican gain
19	Democratic	Republican	Julie Olthoff	Shelli VanDenburgh	312	▲ Republican gain
35	Republican	Democratic	Melanie Wright	L. Jack Lutz	206	▼ Democratic gain
45	Democratic	Republican	Bruce Borders	Bionca Gambill	2,260	▲ Republican gain

District 45 had been won by Democrat Kreg Battles in 2012. Battles resigned during 2014, and Democratic appointee Bionca Gambill lost to Republican Bruce Borders in November. The margin was 2,260 votes.

=== Closest contests ===
Six races were decided by fewer than ten percentage points. The margin shown is the difference between the winner and runner-up as a share of all votes recorded for that district, including any third-party or independent votes.

District	Winner	Party	Runner-up	Margin (votes)	Margin (pp)
35	Melanie Wright	Democratic	L. Jack Lutz	206	1.21
19	Julie Olthoff	Republican	Shelli VanDenburgh	312	2.23
12	Bill Fine	Republican	Mara Candelaria Reardon	421	2.95
87	Christina Hale	Democratic	Michael Friedman	489	3.06
27	Sheila Klinker	Democratic	Chuck Hockema	382	3.56
92	Karlee Macer	Democratic	Bradford Moulton	560	5.34

=== District overview ===
The table shows the winner, the share of the total district vote received by that candidate and whether the party held or gained the district relative to the 2012 election. The two-party swing compares Republican and Democratic shares of the two-party vote between 2012 and 2014. It is omitted when either party lacked a candidate in one of the elections.

District	Winning candidate	Party	Winner's share	Two-party swing vs. 2012 (pp)	Seat status
1	Linda C. Lawson	Democratic	100.0%	–	Democratic hold
2	Earl L. Harris	Democratic	90.2%	–	Democratic hold
3	Charlie Brown	Democratic	100.0%	–	Democratic hold
4	Ed Soliday	Republican	55.5%	R +3.8	Republican hold
5	Dale DeVon	Republican	100.0%	–	Republican hold
6	B. Patrick Bauer	Democratic	100.0%	–	Democratic hold
7	David L. Niezgodski	Democratic	75.8%	–	Democratic hold
8	Ryan Dvorak	Democratic	100.0%	–	Democratic hold
9	Scott D. Pelath	Democratic	100.0%	–	Democratic hold
10	Chuck Moseley	Democratic	57.1%	–	Democratic hold
11	Michael J. Aylesworth	Republican	56.7%	D +4.6	Republican hold
12	Bill Fine	Republican	51.5%	R +5.3	Republican gain from Democratic
13	Sharon Negele	Republican	100.0%	–	Republican hold
14	Vernon G Smith	Democratic	100.0%	–	Democratic hold
15	Hal Slager	Republican	58.7%	R +7.6	Republican hold
16	Douglas Gutwein	Republican	64.4%	R +5.5	Republican hold
17	Timothy Harman	Republican	100.0%	–	Republican hold
18	David Wolkins	Republican	100.0%	–	Republican hold
19	Julie Olthoff	Republican	51.1%	R +6.6	Republican gain from Democratic
20	Tom Dermody	Republican	100.0%	–	Republican hold
21	Timothy Wesco	Republican	67.0%	–	Republican hold
22	Curt Nisly	Republican	70.8%	D +1.0	Republican hold
23	Bill Friend	Republican	100.0%	–	Republican hold
24	Steve Braun	Republican	100.0%	–	Republican hold
25	Donald Lehe	Republican	71.1%	R +10.3	Republican hold
26	Randy Truitt	Republican	100.0%	–	Republican hold
27	Sheila Klinker	Democratic	51.8%	R +2.7	Democratic hold
28	Jeffrey Thompson	Republican	82.7%	–	Republican hold
29	Kathy Kreag Richardson	Republican	74.0%	–	Republican hold
30	Mike Karickhoff	Republican	57.8%	R +3.8	Republican hold
31	Kevin A Mahan	Republican	100.0%	–	Republican hold
32	P. Eric Turner	Republican	63.1%	–	Republican hold
33	Greg Beumer	Republican	59.6%	R +4.4	Republican hold
34	Sue Errington	Democratic	65.7%	R +1.9	Democratic hold
35	Melanie Wright	Democratic	50.6%	D +1.4	Democratic gain from Republican
36	Terri Jo Austin	Democratic	61.0%	R +2.8	Democratic hold
37	Todd Huston	Republican	100.0%	–	Republican hold
38	Heath VanNatter	Republican	100.0%	–	Republican hold
39	Jerry Torr	Republican	73.2%	–	Republican hold
40	Gregory E Steuerwald	Republican	100.0%	–	Republican hold
41	Tim Brown	Republican	100.0%	–	Republican hold
42	Alan Morrison	Republican	56.2%	R +6.0	Republican hold
43	Clyde Kersey	Democratic	100.0%	–	Democratic hold
44	Jim Baird	Republican	100.0%	–	Republican hold
45	Bruce Borders	Republican	56.7%	R +6.9	Republican gain from Democratic
46	Bob Heaton	Republican	62.3%	R +4.7	Republican hold
47	John Price	Republican	76.8%	R +6.2	Republican hold
48	Doug Miller	Republican	100.0%	–	Republican hold
49	Wesley Culver	Republican	83.1%	–	Republican hold
50	Dan Leonard	Republican	100.0%	–	Republican hold
51	Dennis Zent	Republican	100.0%	–	Republican hold
52	Ben Smaltz	Republican	75.4%	R +4.4	Republican hold
53	Bob Cherry	Republican	81.2%	–	Republican hold
54	Tom Saunders	Republican	73.2%	–	Republican hold
55	Cindy Meyer Ziemke	Republican	70.9%	R +10.3	Republican hold
56	Richard Hamm	Republican	59.3%	R +11.4	Republican hold
57	Sean Eberhart	Republican	100.0%	–	Republican hold
58	Woody Burton	Republican	100.0%	–	Republican hold
59	Milo Smith	Republican	59.6%	–	Republican hold
60	Peggy Mayfield	Republican	63.8%	R +9.6	Republican hold
61	Matt Pierce	Democratic	100.0%	–	Democratic hold
62	Matt Ubelhor	Republican	55.0%	R +4.4	Republican hold
63	Mike Braun	Republican	100.0%	–	Republican hold
64	Tom Washburne	Republican	100.0%	–	Republican hold
65	Eric Koch	Republican	100.0%	–	Republican hold
66	Terry Goodin	Democratic	59.0%	D +6.7	Democratic hold
67	Randy Frye	Republican	100.0%	–	Republican hold
68	Jud Mcmillin	Republican	69.8%	R +1.8	Republican hold
69	Jim Lucas	Republican	100.0%	–	Republican hold
70	Rhonda Rhoads	Republican	58.8%	R +2.0	Republican hold
71	Steve Stemler	Democratic	83.9%	–	Democratic hold
72	Ed Clere	Republican	56.6%	R +2.2	Republican hold
73	Steve Davisson	Republican	70.2%	R +15.7	Republican hold
74	Lloyd Arnold	Republican	61.3%	R +8.6	Republican hold
75	Ron Bacon	Republican	66.6%	R +9.1	Republican hold
76	Wendy Mcnamara	Republican	63.0%	R +6.6	Republican hold
77	Gail Riecken	Democratic	61.9%	R +2.4	Democratic hold
78	Holli Sullivan	Republican	63.8%	–	Republican hold
79	Matthew Lehman	Republican	100.0%	–	Republican hold
80	Phil GiaQuinta	Democratic	100.0%	–	Democratic hold
81	Martin Carbaugh	Republican	59.5%	R +5.6	Republican hold
82	David Ober	Republican	76.9%	R +9.2	Republican hold
83	Christopher Judy	Republican	100.0%	–	Republican hold
84	Robert Morris	Republican	66.7%	R +3.7	Republican hold
85	Casey Cox	Republican	100.0%	–	Republican hold
86	Edward DeLaney	Democratic	100.0%	–	Democratic hold
87	Christina Hale	Democratic	51.5%	D +1.5	Democratic hold
88	Brian Bosma	Republican	100.0%	–	Republican hold
89	Cindy Kirchhofer	Republican	59.2%	–	Republican hold
90	Mike Speedy	Republican	100.0%	–	Republican hold
91	Robert Behning	Republican	66.4%	R +3.6	Republican hold
92	Karlee Macer	Democratic	51.2%	R +1.2	Democratic hold
93	Dave Frizzell	Republican	72.1%	R +5.4	Republican hold
94	Cherrish Pryor	Democratic	100.0%	–	Democratic hold
95	John Bartlett	Democratic	100.0%	–	Democratic hold
96	Gregory Porter	Democratic	84.0%	R +2.5	Democratic hold
97	Justin Moed	Democratic	100.0%	–	Democratic hold
98	Robin Shackleford	Democratic	89.2%	–	Democratic hold
99	Vanessa Summers	Democratic	100.0%	–	Democratic hold
100	Dan Forestal	Democratic	100.0%	–	Democratic hold

== Results by district ==
The following tables use county-level candidate returns aggregated by district. Percentage-point changes are comparisons with the corresponding party's share in the 2012 House election. A dash indicates that no comparable party vote was recorded in the 2012 county-level data. The general-election tables include all candidates recorded in the dataset, including independents and Libertarians.

=== District 1 ===
==== General election ====
District 1 general-election results, November 4, 2014
Party	Candidate	Votes	Vote share	Change vs. 2012 (pp)
Democratic	Linda C. Lawson	6,548	100.0%	0.0
Total votes		6,548	100.0%	–
Democratic hold

=== District 2 ===
==== General election ====
District 2 general-election results, November 4, 2014
Party	Candidate	Votes	Vote share	Change vs. 2012 (pp)
Democratic	Earl L. Harris	8,659	90.2%	▼9.8
Republican	Jayson Reeves	942	9.8%	–
Total votes		9,601	100.0%	–
Democratic hold

=== District 3 ===
==== General election ====
District 3 general-election results, November 4, 2014
Party	Candidate	Votes	Vote share	Change vs. 2012 (pp)
Democratic	Charlie Brown	8,898	100.0%	0.0
Total votes		8,898	100.0%	–
Democratic hold

=== District 4 ===
==== General election ====
District 4 general-election results, November 4, 2014
Party	Candidate	Votes	Vote share	Change vs. 2012 (pp)
Republican	Ed Soliday	9,885	55.5%	▲3.8
Democratic	Debora Porter	7,934	44.5%	▼3.8
Total votes		17,819	100.0%	–
Republican hold

=== District 5 ===
==== General election ====
District 5 general-election results, November 4, 2014
Party	Candidate	Votes	Vote share	Change vs. 2012 (pp)
Republican	Dale DeVon	9,379	100.0%	▲42.1
Total votes		9,379	100.0%	–
Republican hold

=== District 6 ===
==== General election ====
District 6 general-election results, November 4, 2014
Party	Candidate	Votes	Vote share	Change vs. 2012 (pp)
Democratic	B. Patrick Bauer	8,163	100.0%	0.0
Total votes		8,163	100.0%	–
Democratic hold

=== District 7 ===
==== General election ====
District 7 general-election results, November 4, 2014
Party	Candidate	Votes	Vote share	Change vs. 2012 (pp)
Democratic	David L. Niezgodski	8,234	75.8%	▲18.3
Libertarian	Mark Vogel	2,635	24.2%	–
Total votes		10,869	100.0%	–
Democratic hold

=== District 8 ===
==== General election ====
District 8 general-election results, November 4, 2014
Party	Candidate	Votes	Vote share	Change vs. 2012 (pp)
Democratic	Ryan Dvorak	9,785	100.0%	▲45.2
Total votes		9,785	100.0%	–
Democratic hold

=== District 9 ===
==== General election ====
District 9 general-election results, November 4, 2014
Party	Candidate	Votes	Vote share	Change vs. 2012 (pp)
Democratic	Scott D. Pelath	9,861	100.0%	▲30.5
Total votes		9,861	100.0%	–
Democratic hold

=== District 10 ===
==== General election ====
District 10 general-election results, November 4, 2014
Party	Candidate	Votes	Vote share	Change vs. 2012 (pp)
Democratic	Chuck Moseley	7,758	57.1%	▼42.9
Republican	John W. Johnston	5,819	42.9%	–
Total votes		13,577	100.0%	–
Democratic hold

=== District 11 ===
Republican incumbent Rick Niemeyer did not seek re-election. Michael Aylesworth won the open-seat contest.

==== Democratic primary ====
District 11 democratic primary, May 6, 2014
Candidate	Votes	Vote share
James Metro	1,440	53.4%
Phillip Kuiper	1,257	46.6%
Total votes	2,697	100.0%

==== Republican primary ====
District 11 republican primary, May 6, 2014
Candidate	Votes	Vote share
Michael J. Aylesworth	1,721	58.3%
Michael Mears	1,231	41.7%
Total votes	2,952	100.0%

==== General election ====
District 11 general-election results, November 4, 2014
Party	Candidate	Votes	Vote share	Change vs. 2012 (pp)
Republican	Michael J. Aylesworth	8,526	56.7%	▼4.6
Democratic	James Metro	6,511	43.3%	▲4.6
Total votes		15,037	100.0%	–
Republican hold

=== District 12 ===
Republican Bill Fine defeated incumbent Democrat Mara Candelaria Reardon by 421 votes, changing the district from Democratic to Republican control.

==== General election ====
District 12 general-election results, November 4, 2014
Party	Candidate	Votes	Vote share	Change vs. 2012 (pp)
Republican	Bill Fine	7,341	51.5%	▲5.3
Democratic	Mara Candelaria Reardon	6,920	48.5%	▼5.3
Total votes		14,261	100.0%	–
Republican gain from Democratic

=== District 13 ===
==== General election ====
District 13 general-election results, November 4, 2014
Party	Candidate	Votes	Vote share	Change vs. 2012 (pp)
Republican	Sharon Negele	11,229	100.0%	▲41.0
Total votes		11,229	100.0%	–
Republican hold

=== District 14 ===
==== General election ====
District 14 general-election results, November 4, 2014
Party	Candidate	Votes	Vote share	Change vs. 2012 (pp)
Democratic	Vernon G Smith	8,511	100.0%	0.0
Total votes		8,511	100.0%	–
Democratic hold

=== District 15 ===
==== General election ====
District 15 general-election results, November 4, 2014
Party	Candidate	Votes	Vote share	Change vs. 2012 (pp)
Republican	Hal Slager	8,315	58.7%	▲7.6
Democratic	James L Wieser	5,860	41.3%	▼7.6
Total votes		14,175	100.0%	–
Republican hold

=== District 16 ===
==== General election ====
District 16 general-election results, November 4, 2014
Party	Candidate	Votes	Vote share	Change vs. 2012 (pp)
Republican	Douglas Gutwein	9,313	64.4%	▲5.5
Democratic	Richard W Ludington	5,137	35.6%	▼5.5
Total votes		14,450	100.0%	–
Republican hold

=== District 17 ===
==== General election ====
District 17 general-election results, November 4, 2014
Party	Candidate	Votes	Vote share	Change vs. 2012 (pp)
Republican	Timothy Harman	10,536	100.0%	0.0
Total votes		10,536	100.0%	–
Republican hold

=== District 18 ===
==== General election ====
District 18 general-election results, November 4, 2014
Party	Candidate	Votes	Vote share	Change vs. 2012 (pp)
Republican	David Wolkins	10,787	100.0%	▲29.8
Total votes		10,787	100.0%	–
Republican hold

=== District 19 ===
Republican Julie Olthoff defeated Democratic incumbent Shelli VanDenburgh by 312 votes.

==== Republican primary ====
District 19 republican primary, May 6, 2014
Candidate	Votes	Vote share
Julie Olthoff	1,314	60.1%
Chris Retson	874	39.9%
Total votes	2,188	100.0%

==== General election ====
District 19 general-election results, November 4, 2014
Party	Candidate	Votes	Vote share	Change vs. 2012 (pp)
Republican	Julie Olthoff	7,146	51.1%	▲6.6
Democratic	Shelli VanDenburgh	6,834	48.9%	▼6.6
Total votes		13,980	100.0%	–
Republican gain from Democratic

=== District 20 ===
==== General election ====
District 20 general-election results, November 4, 2014
Party	Candidate	Votes	Vote share	Change vs. 2012 (pp)
Republican	Tom Dermody	12,292	100.0%	▲40.1
Total votes		12,292	100.0%	–
Republican hold

=== District 21 ===
==== General election ====
District 21 general-election results, November 4, 2014
Party	Candidate	Votes	Vote share	Change vs. 2012 (pp)
Republican	Timothy Wesco	7,481	67.0%	▼33.0
Democratic	Jodi Buoscio	3,689	33.0%	–
Total votes		11,170	100.0%	–
Republican hold

=== District 22 ===
Curt Nisly defeated Republican incumbent Rebecca Kubacki in the May primary. Nisly then won the general election against Democrat David Kolbe and independent Michael Stinfer.

==== Republican primary ====
District 22 republican primary, May 6, 2014
Candidate	Votes	Vote share
Curt Nisly	4,624	64.8%
Rebecca Kubacki (incumbent)	2,516	35.2%
Total votes	7,140	100.0%

==== General election ====
District 22 general-election results, November 4, 2014
Party	Candidate	Votes	Vote share	Change vs. 2012 (pp)
Republican	Curt Nisly	9,473	70.8%	▼4.8
Democratic	David C. Kolbe	3,235	24.2%	▼0.3
Independent	Michael L. Stinfer	681	5.1%	–
Total votes		13,389	100.0%	–
Republican hold

=== District 23 ===
==== General election ====
District 23 general-election results, November 4, 2014
Party	Candidate	Votes	Vote share	Change vs. 2012 (pp)
Republican	Bill Friend	8,414	100.0%	▲32.2
Total votes		8,414	100.0%	–
Republican hold

=== District 24 ===
==== General election ====
District 24 general-election results, November 4, 2014
Party	Candidate	Votes	Vote share	Change vs. 2012 (pp)
Republican	Steve Braun	12,264	100.0%	0.0
Total votes		12,264	100.0%	–
Republican hold

=== District 25 ===
==== Republican primary ====
District 25 republican primary, May 6, 2014
Candidate	Votes	Vote share
Donald Lehe (incumbent)	4,184	68.7%
Franklyn Voorhies	1,902	31.3%
Total votes	6,086	100.0%

==== General election ====
District 25 general-election results, November 4, 2014
Party	Candidate	Votes	Vote share	Change vs. 2012 (pp)
Republican	Donald Lehe	9,775	71.1%	▲10.3
Democratic	Maurice O. Fuller	3,978	28.9%	▼10.3
Total votes		13,753	100.0%	–
Republican hold

=== District 26 ===
==== General election ====
District 26 general-election results, November 4, 2014
Party	Candidate	Votes	Vote share	Change vs. 2012 (pp)
Republican	Randy Truitt	6,911	100.0%	▲46.8
Total votes		6,911	100.0%	–
Republican hold

=== District 27 ===
==== General election ====
District 27 general-election results, November 4, 2014
Party	Candidate	Votes	Vote share	Change vs. 2012 (pp)
Democratic	Sheila Klinker	5,551	51.8%	▼2.7
Republican	Chuck Hockema	5,169	48.2%	▲2.7
Total votes		10,720	100.0%	–
Democratic hold

=== District 28 ===
==== General election ====
District 28 general-election results, November 4, 2014
Party	Candidate	Votes	Vote share	Change vs. 2012 (pp)
Republican	Jeffrey Thompson	11,430	82.7%	▼2.8
Democratic	Sean Shanley	2,390	17.3%	–
Total votes		13,820	100.0%	–
Republican hold

=== District 29 ===
==== General election ====
District 29 general-election results, November 4, 2014
Party	Candidate	Votes	Vote share	Change vs. 2012 (pp)
Republican	Kathy Kreag Richardson	9,317	74.0%	▼26.0
Democratic	Joe Marcum	3,270	26.0%	–
Total votes		12,587	100.0%	–
Republican hold

=== District 30 ===
==== General election ====
District 30 general-election results, November 4, 2014
Party	Candidate	Votes	Vote share	Change vs. 2012 (pp)
Republican	Mike Karickhoff	8,166	57.8%	▲3.8
Democratic	Chuck Sosbe	5,964	42.2%	▼3.8
Total votes		14,130	100.0%	–
Republican hold

=== District 31 ===
==== General election ====
District 31 general-election results, November 4, 2014
Party	Candidate	Votes	Vote share	Change vs. 2012 (pp)
Republican	Kevin A Mahan	9,677	100.0%	▲46.9
Total votes		9,677	100.0%	–
Republican hold

=== District 32 ===
==== Republican primary ====
District 32 republican primary, May 6, 2014
Candidate	Votes	Vote share
P. Eric Turner (incumbent)	3,937	58.6%
Parvin Gillim	2,787	41.4%
Total votes	6,724	100.0%

==== General election ====
District 32 general-election results, November 4, 2014
Party	Candidate	Votes	Vote share	Change vs. 2012 (pp)
Republican	P. Eric Turner	8,981	63.1%	▼36.9
Democratic	Robert Ashley	5,260	36.9%	–
Total votes		14,241	100.0%	–
Republican hold

=== District 33 ===
==== General election ====
District 33 general-election results, November 4, 2014
Party	Candidate	Votes	Vote share	Change vs. 2012 (pp)
Republican	Greg Beumer	9,161	59.6%	▲1.8
Democratic	Shon Byrum	5,567	36.2%	▼6.0
Libertarian	Zeb Sutton	642	4.2%	–
Total votes		15,370	100.0%	–
Republican hold

=== District 34 ===
==== General election ====
District 34 general-election results, November 4, 2014
Party	Candidate	Votes	Vote share	Change vs. 2012 (pp)
Democratic	Sue Errington	6,357	65.7%	▼1.9
Republican	Stuart A Keenan	3,317	34.3%	▲1.9
Total votes		9,674	100.0%	–
Democratic hold

=== District 35 ===
Democrat Melanie Wright unseated Republican incumbent L. Jack Lutz by 206 votes.

==== General election ====
District 35 general-election results, November 4, 2014
Party	Candidate	Votes	Vote share	Change vs. 2012 (pp)
Democratic	Melanie Wright	8,581	50.6%	▲1.4
Republican	L. Jack Lutz	8,375	49.4%	▼1.4
Total votes		16,956	100.0%	–
Democratic gain from Republican

=== District 36 ===
==== General election ====
District 36 general-election results, November 4, 2014
Party	Candidate	Votes	Vote share	Change vs. 2012 (pp)
Democratic	Terri Jo Austin	8,544	61.0%	▼2.8
Republican	Jim Shelton Jr.	5,459	39.0%	▲2.8
Total votes		14,003	100.0%	–
Democratic hold

=== District 37 ===
==== General election ====
District 37 general-election results, November 4, 2014
Party	Candidate	Votes	Vote share	Change vs. 2012 (pp)
Republican	Todd Huston	9,346	100.0%	0.0
Total votes		9,346	100.0%	–
Republican hold

=== District 38 ===
==== General election ====
District 38 general-election results, November 4, 2014
Party	Candidate	Votes	Vote share	Change vs. 2012 (pp)
Republican	Heath VanNatter	11,435	100.0%	0.0
Total votes		11,435	100.0%	–
Republican hold

=== District 39 ===
==== Republican primary ====
District 39 republican primary, May 6, 2014
Candidate	Votes	Vote share
Jerry Torr (incumbent)	3,009	63.1%
Don Meier	1,756	36.9%
Total votes	4,765	100.0%

==== General election ====
District 39 general-election results, November 4, 2014
Party	Candidate	Votes	Vote share	Change vs. 2012 (pp)
Republican	Jerry Torr	10,978	73.2%	▼17.0
Democratic	David B Russ	4,012	26.8%	–
Total votes		14,990	100.0%	–
Republican hold

=== District 40 ===
==== General election ====
District 40 general-election results, November 4, 2014
Party	Candidate	Votes	Vote share	Change vs. 2012 (pp)
Republican	Gregory E Steuerwald	9,605	100.0%	▲35.1
Total votes		9,605	100.0%	–
Republican hold

=== District 41 ===
==== General election ====
District 41 general-election results, November 4, 2014
Party	Candidate	Votes	Vote share	Change vs. 2012 (pp)
Republican	Tim Brown	11,862	100.0%	0.0
Total votes		11,862	100.0%	–
Republican hold

=== District 42 ===
==== General election ====
District 42 general-election results, November 4, 2014
Party	Candidate	Votes	Vote share	Change vs. 2012 (pp)
Republican	Alan Morrison	9,224	56.2%	▲6.0
Democratic	Mark Spelbring	7,193	43.8%	▼6.0
Total votes		16,417	100.0%	–
Republican hold

=== District 43 ===
==== General election ====
District 43 general-election results, November 4, 2014
Party	Candidate	Votes	Vote share	Change vs. 2012 (pp)
Democratic	Clyde Kersey	7,856	100.0%	▲35.2
Total votes		7,856	100.0%	–
Democratic hold

=== District 44 ===
==== General election ====
District 44 general-election results, November 4, 2014
Party	Candidate	Votes	Vote share	Change vs. 2012 (pp)
Republican	Jim Baird	14,563	100.0%	▲34.9
Total votes		14,563	100.0%	–
Republican hold

=== District 45 ===
Kreg Battles won the Democratic primary but resigned from the House on May 16. Bionca Gambill was appointed to succeed him on June 17 and became the Democratic general-election candidate. Republican Bruce Borders won the seat in November.

==== General election ====
District 45 general-election results, November 4, 2014
Party	Candidate	Votes	Vote share	Change vs. 2012 (pp)
Republican	Bruce Borders	9,534	56.7%	▲6.9
Democratic	Bionca Gambill	7,274	43.3%	▼6.9
Total votes		16,808	100.0%	–
Republican gain from Democratic

=== District 46 ===
==== General election ====
District 46 general-election results, November 4, 2014
Party	Candidate	Votes	Vote share	Change vs. 2012 (pp)
Republican	Bob Heaton	9,152	62.3%	▲4.7
Democratic	Jim Mann II	5,543	37.7%	▼4.7
Total votes		14,695	100.0%	–
Republican hold

=== District 47 ===
==== General election ====
District 47 general-election results, November 4, 2014
Party	Candidate	Votes	Vote share	Change vs. 2012 (pp)
Republican	John Price	8,500	76.8%	▲6.2
Democratic	Michael L Reddick	2,561	23.2%	▼6.2
Total votes		11,061	100.0%	–
Republican hold

=== District 48 ===
Republican incumbent Timothy Neese did not seek another term. Doug Miller won the Republican nomination and was unopposed in the general election.

==== Republican primary ====
District 48 republican primary, May 6, 2014
Candidate	Votes	Vote share
Doug Miller	2,080	41.2%
Jesse Bohannon	1,982	39.3%
Adam M. Bujalski	986	19.5%
Total votes	5,048	100.0%

==== General election ====
District 48 general-election results, November 4, 2014
Party	Candidate	Votes	Vote share	Change vs. 2012 (pp)
Republican	Doug Miller	8,857	100.0%	▲34.8
Total votes		8,857	100.0%	–
Republican hold

=== District 49 ===
==== General election ====
District 49 general-election results, November 4, 2014
Party	Candidate	Votes	Vote share	Change vs. 2012 (pp)
Republican	Wesley Culver	8,357	83.1%	▼16.9
Libertarian	Joshua O'Brien	1,703	16.9%	–
Total votes		10,060	100.0%	–
Republican hold

=== District 50 ===
==== General election ====
District 50 general-election results, November 4, 2014
Party	Candidate	Votes	Vote share	Change vs. 2012 (pp)
Republican	Dan Leonard	10,655	100.0%	▲32.6
Total votes		10,655	100.0%	–
Republican hold

=== District 51 ===
==== General election ====
District 51 general-election results, November 4, 2014
Party	Candidate	Votes	Vote share	Change vs. 2012 (pp)
Republican	Dennis Zent	9,471	100.0%	▲33.1
Total votes		9,471	100.0%	–
Republican hold

=== District 52 ===
==== General election ====
District 52 general-election results, November 4, 2014
Party	Candidate	Votes	Vote share	Change vs. 2012 (pp)
Republican	Ben Smaltz	9,687	75.4%	▲4.4
Democratic	Charlie Odier	3,163	24.6%	▼4.4
Total votes		12,850	100.0%	–
Republican hold

=== District 53 ===
==== General election ====
District 53 general-election results, November 4, 2014
Party	Candidate	Votes	Vote share	Change vs. 2012 (pp)
Republican	Bob Cherry	9,124	81.2%	▲5.0
Libertarian	Benjamin Parker	2,113	18.8%	▼5.0
Total votes		11,237	100.0%	–
Republican hold

=== District 54 ===
==== General election ====
District 54 general-election results, November 4, 2014
Party	Candidate	Votes	Vote share	Change vs. 2012 (pp)
Republican	Tom Saunders	9,444	73.2%	▲0.1
Libertarian	Brad Owens	3,452	26.8%	▼0.1
Total votes		12,896	100.0%	–
Republican hold

=== District 55 ===
==== General election ====
District 55 general-election results, November 4, 2014
Party	Candidate	Votes	Vote share	Change vs. 2012 (pp)
Republican	Cindy Meyer Ziemke	10,909	70.9%	▲10.3
Democratic	Glenn E Bailey	4,483	29.1%	▼10.3
Total votes		15,392	100.0%	–
Republican hold

=== District 56 ===
==== General election ====
District 56 general-election results, November 4, 2014
Party	Candidate	Votes	Vote share	Change vs. 2012 (pp)
Republican	Richard Hamm	5,782	59.3%	▲9.9
Democratic	Phillip Pflum	3,266	33.5%	▼11.1
Libertarian	Mark Joseph Brim	705	7.2%	▲1.2
Total votes		9,753	100.0%	–
Republican hold

=== District 57 ===
==== General election ====
District 57 general-election results, November 4, 2014
Party	Candidate	Votes	Vote share	Change vs. 2012 (pp)
Republican	Sean Eberhart	11,025	100.0%	▲32.9
Total votes		11,025	100.0%	–
Republican hold

=== District 58 ===
==== General election ====
District 58 general-election results, November 4, 2014
Party	Candidate	Votes	Vote share	Change vs. 2012 (pp)
Republican	Woody Burton	7,664	100.0%	0.0
Total votes		7,664	100.0%	–
Republican hold

=== District 59 ===
==== Republican primary ====
District 59 republican primary, May 6, 2014
Candidate	Votes	Vote share
Milo Smith (incumbent)	4,239	59.4%
Ryan Lauer	2,895	40.6%
Total votes	7,134	100.0%

==== General election ====
District 59 general-election results, November 4, 2014
Party	Candidate	Votes	Vote share	Change vs. 2012 (pp)
Republican	Milo Smith	8,034	59.6%	▼40.4
Democratic	Zack Ellison	5,450	40.4%	–
Total votes		13,484	100.0%	–
Republican hold

=== District 60 ===
==== General election ====
District 60 general-election results, November 4, 2014
Party	Candidate	Votes	Vote share	Change vs. 2012 (pp)
Republican	Peggy Mayfield	9,613	63.8%	▲9.6
Democratic	Daymon Brodhacker	5,444	36.2%	▼9.6
Total votes		15,057	100.0%	–
Republican hold

=== District 61 ===
==== General election ====
District 61 general-election results, November 4, 2014
Party	Candidate	Votes	Vote share	Change vs. 2012 (pp)
Democratic	Matt Pierce	6,725	100.0%	0.0
Total votes		6,725	100.0%	–
Democratic hold

=== District 62 ===
==== General election ====
District 62 general-election results, November 4, 2014
Party	Candidate	Votes	Vote share	Change vs. 2012 (pp)
Republican	Matt Ubelhor	9,429	55.0%	▲2.1
Democratic	Jeff Sparks	7,038	41.0%	▼6.1
Libertarian	Ashley Qualkenbush	685	4.0%	–
Total votes		17,152	100.0%	–
Republican hold

=== District 63 ===
Republican incumbent Mark Messmer did not seek another House term. Mike Braun won the seat without general-election opposition.

==== General election ====
District 63 general-election results, November 4, 2014
Party	Candidate	Votes	Vote share	Change vs. 2012 (pp)
Republican	Mike Braun	13,329	100.0%	0.0
Total votes		13,329	100.0%	–
Republican hold

=== District 64 ===
==== General election ====
District 64 general-election results, November 4, 2014
Party	Candidate	Votes	Vote share	Change vs. 2012 (pp)
Republican	Tom Washburne	14,133	100.0%	▲41.7
Total votes		14,133	100.0%	–
Republican hold

=== District 65 ===
==== General election ====
District 65 general-election results, November 4, 2014
Party	Candidate	Votes	Vote share	Change vs. 2012 (pp)
Republican	Eric Koch	12,791	100.0%	▲16.5
Total votes		12,791	100.0%	–
Republican hold

=== District 66 ===
==== General election ====
District 66 general-election results, November 4, 2014
Party	Candidate	Votes	Vote share	Change vs. 2012 (pp)
Democratic	Terry Goodin	10,882	59.0%	▲6.7
Republican	Lisa Seng Shadday	7,566	41.0%	▼6.7
Total votes		18,448	100.0%	–
Democratic hold

=== District 67 ===
==== General election ====
District 67 general-election results, November 4, 2014
Party	Candidate	Votes	Vote share	Change vs. 2012 (pp)
Republican	Randy Frye	13,308	100.0%	▲42.0
Total votes		13,308	100.0%	–
Republican hold

=== District 68 ===
==== General election ====
District 68 general-election results, November 4, 2014
Party	Candidate	Votes	Vote share	Change vs. 2012 (pp)
Republican	Jud Mcmillin	10,442	69.8%	▲1.8
Democratic	Ricky L Gill	4,512	30.2%	▼1.8
Total votes		14,954	100.0%	–
Republican hold

=== District 69 ===
==== General election ====
District 69 general-election results, November 4, 2014
Party	Candidate	Votes	Vote share	Change vs. 2012 (pp)
Republican	Jim Lucas	12,200	100.0%	▲42.2
Total votes		12,200	100.0%	–
Republican hold

=== District 70 ===
==== General election ====
District 70 general-election results, November 4, 2014
Party	Candidate	Votes	Vote share	Change vs. 2012 (pp)
Republican	Rhonda Rhoads	11,462	58.8%	▲2.0
Democratic	Heidi Sellers	8,022	41.2%	▼2.0
Total votes		19,484	100.0%	–
Republican hold

=== District 71 ===
==== General election ====
District 71 general-election results, November 4, 2014
Party	Candidate	Votes	Vote share	Change vs. 2012 (pp)
Democratic	Steve Stemler	11,370	83.9%	▼16.1
Libertarian	Russell Brooksbank	2,182	16.1%	–
Total votes		13,552	100.0%	–
Democratic hold

=== District 72 ===
==== General election ====
District 72 general-election results, November 4, 2014
Party	Candidate	Votes	Vote share	Change vs. 2012 (pp)
Republican	Ed Clere	9,076	56.6%	▲2.2
Democratic	Kevin Sue Bailey	6,964	43.4%	▼2.2
Total votes		16,040	100.0%	–
Republican hold

=== District 73 ===
==== General election ====
District 73 general-election results, November 4, 2014
Party	Candidate	Votes	Vote share	Change vs. 2012 (pp)
Republican	Steve Davisson	11,027	70.2%	▲15.7
Democratic	Douglas C Leatherbury	4,679	29.8%	▼15.7
Total votes		15,706	100.0%	–
Republican hold

=== District 74 ===
==== General election ====
District 74 general-election results, November 4, 2014
Party	Candidate	Votes	Vote share	Change vs. 2012 (pp)
Republican	Lloyd Arnold	11,077	61.3%	▲8.6
Democratic	Christopher Coyle	6,993	38.7%	▼8.6
Total votes		18,070	100.0%	–
Republican hold

=== District 75 ===
==== General election ====
District 75 general-election results, November 4, 2014
Party	Candidate	Votes	Vote share	Change vs. 2012 (pp)
Republican	Ron Bacon	12,003	66.6%	▲9.1
Democratic	Steve Spinks	6,019	33.4%	▼9.1
Total votes		18,022	100.0%	–
Republican hold

=== District 76 ===
==== General election ====
District 76 general-election results, November 4, 2014
Party	Candidate	Votes	Vote share	Change vs. 2012 (pp)
Republican	Wendy Mcnamara	9,341	63.0%	▲6.6
Democratic	Tony Goben	5,488	37.0%	▼6.6
Total votes		14,829	100.0%	–
Republican hold

=== District 77 ===
==== General election ====
District 77 general-election results, November 4, 2014
Party	Candidate	Votes	Vote share	Change vs. 2012 (pp)
Democratic	Gail Riecken	6,183	61.9%	▼2.4
Republican	Jeremy Heath	3,804	38.1%	▲2.4
Total votes		9,987	100.0%	–
Democratic hold

=== District 78 ===
==== General election ====
District 78 general-election results, November 4, 2014
Party	Candidate	Votes	Vote share	Change vs. 2012 (pp)
Republican	Holli Sullivan	9,676	63.8%	▼36.2
Democratic	Stephen R Melcher	5,482	36.2%	–
Total votes		15,158	100.0%	–
Republican hold

=== District 79 ===
==== General election ====
District 79 general-election results, November 4, 2014
Party	Candidate	Votes	Vote share	Change vs. 2012 (pp)
Republican	Matthew Lehman	12,953	100.0%	▲32.9
Total votes		12,953	100.0%	–
Republican hold

=== District 80 ===
==== General election ====
District 80 general-election results, November 4, 2014
Party	Candidate	Votes	Vote share	Change vs. 2012 (pp)
Democratic	Phil GiaQuinta	6,723	100.0%	0.0
Total votes		6,723	100.0%	–
Democratic hold

=== District 81 ===
==== General election ====
District 81 general-election results, November 4, 2014
Party	Candidate	Votes	Vote share	Change vs. 2012 (pp)
Republican	Martin Carbaugh	6,926	59.5%	▲7.8
Democratic	Thaddeus Gerardot	4,708	40.5%	▼3.7
Total votes		11,634	100.0%	–
Republican hold

=== District 82 ===
==== General election ====
District 82 general-election results, November 4, 2014
Party	Candidate	Votes	Vote share	Change vs. 2012 (pp)
Republican	David Ober	9,654	76.9%	▲9.2
Democratic	Mike Wilber	2,898	23.1%	▼9.2
Total votes		12,552	100.0%	–
Republican hold

=== District 83 ===
Christopher Judy defeated Republican incumbent Kathy Heuer in the primary. Heuer later resigned, and Judy was appointed to the House seat on September 22. He ran unopposed in November.

==== Republican primary ====
District 83 republican primary, May 6, 2014
Candidate	Votes	Vote share
Christopher Judy	3,910	57.0%
Kathy Heuer (incumbent)	2,952	43.0%
Total votes	6,862	100.0%

==== General election ====
District 83 general-election results, November 4, 2014
Party	Candidate	Votes	Vote share	Change vs. 2012 (pp)
Republican	Christopher Judy	13,748	100.0%	▲27.9
Total votes		13,748	100.0%	–
Republican hold

=== District 84 ===
==== Republican primary ====
District 84 republican primary, May 6, 2014
Candidate	Votes	Vote share
Bob Morris (incumbent)	3,755	51.7%
Michael Barranda	3,502	48.3%
Total votes	7,257	100.0%

==== General election ====
District 84 general-election results, November 4, 2014
Party	Candidate	Votes	Vote share	Change vs. 2012 (pp)
Republican	Robert Morris	10,811	66.7%	▲6.6
Democratic	Fred Haigh	5,399	33.3%	▼2.0
Total votes		16,210	100.0%	–
Republican hold

=== District 85 ===
==== Republican primary ====
District 85 republican primary, May 6, 2014
Candidate	Votes	Vote share
Casey Cox (incumbent)	2,613	49.5%
Denny Worman	1,515	28.7%
Ken Knoblauch	1,148	21.8%
Total votes	5,276	100.0%

==== General election ====
District 85 general-election results, November 4, 2014
Party	Candidate	Votes	Vote share	Change vs. 2012 (pp)
Republican	Casey Cox	11,222	100.0%	▲35.7
Total votes		11,222	100.0%	–
Republican hold

=== District 86 ===
==== General election ====
District 86 general-election results, November 4, 2014
Party	Candidate	Votes	Vote share	Change vs. 2012 (pp)
Democratic	Edward DeLaney	10,897	100.0%	▲39.9
Total votes		10,897	100.0%	–
Democratic hold

=== District 87 ===
==== General election ====
District 87 general-election results, November 4, 2014
Party	Candidate	Votes	Vote share	Change vs. 2012 (pp)
Democratic	Christina Hale	8,236	51.5%	▲1.5
Republican	Michael Friedman	7,747	48.5%	▼1.5
Total votes		15,983	100.0%	–
Democratic hold

=== District 88 ===
==== General election ====
District 88 general-election results, November 4, 2014
Party	Candidate	Votes	Vote share	Change vs. 2012 (pp)
Republican	Brian Bosma	11,791	100.0%	▲32.4
Total votes		11,791	100.0%	–
Republican hold

=== District 89 ===
==== General election ====
District 89 general-election results, November 4, 2014
Party	Candidate	Votes	Vote share	Change vs. 2012 (pp)
Republican	Cindy Kirchhofer	6,770	59.2%	▼40.8
Democratic	Debra Jenkins	4,669	40.8%	–
Total votes		11,439	100.0%	–
Republican hold

=== District 90 ===
==== General election ====
District 90 general-election results, November 4, 2014
Party	Candidate	Votes	Vote share	Change vs. 2012 (pp)
Republican	Mike Speedy	9,169	100.0%	0.0
Total votes		9,169	100.0%	–
Republican hold

=== District 91 ===
==== Republican primary ====
District 91 republican primary, May 6, 2014
Candidate	Votes	Vote share
Robert Behning (incumbent)	2,351	57.6%
Michael Scott	1,731	42.4%
Total votes	4,082	100.0%

==== General election ====
District 91 general-election results, November 4, 2014
Party	Candidate	Votes	Vote share	Change vs. 2012 (pp)
Republican	Robert Behning	5,981	66.4%	▲3.6
Democratic	Patrick Lockhart	3,022	33.6%	▼3.6
Total votes		9,003	100.0%	–
Republican hold

=== District 92 ===
==== General election ====
District 92 general-election results, November 4, 2014
Party	Candidate	Votes	Vote share	Change vs. 2012 (pp)
Democratic	Karlee Macer	5,374	51.2%	▼2.7
Republican	Bradford Moulton	4,814	45.9%	▼0.1
Independent	John L. Couch	299	2.9%	–
Total votes		10,487	100.0%	–
Democratic hold

=== District 93 ===
==== General election ====
District 93 general-election results, November 4, 2014
Party	Candidate	Votes	Vote share	Change vs. 2012 (pp)
Republican	Dave Frizzell	8,355	72.1%	▲5.4
Democratic	Ryan Guillory	3,235	27.9%	▼5.4
Total votes		11,590	100.0%	–
Republican hold

=== District 94 ===
==== General election ====
District 94 general-election results, November 4, 2014
Party	Candidate	Votes	Vote share	Change vs. 2012 (pp)
Democratic	Cherrish Pryor	8,859	100.0%	▲3.4
Total votes		8,859	100.0%	–
Democratic hold

=== District 95 ===
==== General election ====
District 95 general-election results, November 4, 2014
Party	Candidate	Votes	Vote share	Change vs. 2012 (pp)
Democratic	John Bartlett	7,970	100.0%	0.0
Total votes		7,970	100.0%	–
Democratic hold

=== District 96 ===
==== General election ====
District 96 general-election results, November 4, 2014
Party	Candidate	Votes	Vote share	Change vs. 2012 (pp)
Democratic	Gregory Porter	11,767	84.0%	▲0.7
Republican	Margaret A Jones	2,248	16.0%	▲3.0
Total votes		14,015	100.0%	–
Democratic hold

=== District 97 ===
==== General election ====
District 97 general-election results, November 4, 2014
Party	Candidate	Votes	Vote share	Change vs. 2012 (pp)
Democratic	Justin Moed	3,689	100.0%	▲41.7
Total votes		3,689	100.0%	–
Democratic hold

=== District 98 ===
==== General election ====
District 98 general-election results, November 4, 2014
Party	Candidate	Votes	Vote share	Change vs. 2012 (pp)
Democratic	Robin Shackleford	6,520	89.2%	▼10.8
Libertarian	Bill Levin	788	10.8%	–
Total votes		7,308	100.0%	–
Democratic hold

=== District 99 ===
==== General election ====
District 99 general-election results, November 4, 2014
Party	Candidate	Votes	Vote share	Change vs. 2012 (pp)
Democratic	Vanessa Summers	8,095	100.0%	▲16.7
Total votes		8,095	100.0%	–
Democratic hold

=== District 100 ===
==== General election ====
District 100 general-election results, November 4, 2014
Party	Candidate	Votes	Vote share	Change vs. 2012 (pp)
Democratic	Dan Forestal	5,906	100.0%	▲41.9
Total votes		5,906	100.0%	–
Democratic hold

== See also ==
- 2014 Indiana elections
- Indiana House of Representatives
