= Utah's 18th State Senate district =

American legislative district

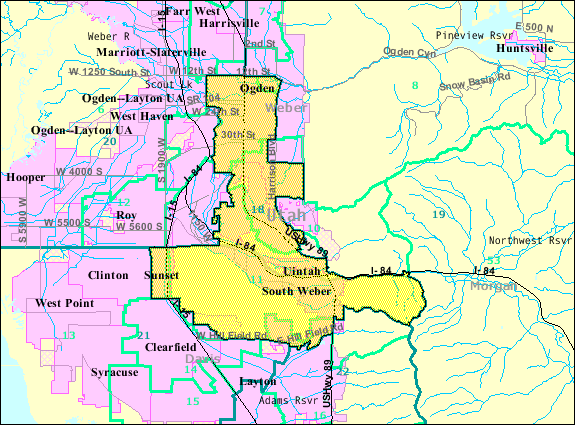
Map of the 18th Utah Senate District.

The 18th Utah Senate District is located in Salt Lake and Utah Counties and includes portions of Utah House Districts 47, 48, 49, 50, 51, and 52. The current State Senator representing the 18th district is Daniel McCay. McCay was elected to the Utah Senate in 2022 and is up for re-election in 2026.

== Previous Utah State Senators (District 18) ==
Name	Party	Term
David L. Thomas	Republican	2003–2006
D. Edgar Allen	Democratic	1999–2002
Nathan C. Tanner	Republican	1995–1999
Winn L. Richards	Democratic	1987–1994
Dale E. Stratford	Republican	1983–1986
Ronald T. Halverson	Republican	1979–1982
M. Blaine Peterson	Democratic	1975–1978
E. LaMar Buckner	Republican	1973–1974
Ezra T. Clark	Republican	1967–1972
Loren D. Squire	Democratic	1965
Orval Hafen	Republican	1957–1963

== Election results ==
=== 2006 General Election ===
Utah State Senate election, 2006
Party	Candidate	Votes	%	±%
Republican	Jon J. Greiner	6,483	51.8	
Democratic	Stuart Reid	6,031	48.2	

== See also ==
- Jon J. Greiner
- Utah Democratic Party
- Utah Republican Party
- Utah Senate
