= 2014 French consular elections =

In May 2014, French consular elections were held to allow French citizens residing abroad to elect their delegates and consular advisors for the first time. These elections were conducted online from 14 May to 20 May, followed by in-person voting on 24 and 25 May. A total of 68 delegates and 443 consular advisors were elected.

These elections were the outcome of the law passed on July 22, 2013, which reformed the representation of French citizens living abroad. This law followed the election of some advisors since 1982 to the Assembly of French Citizens Abroad. These bodies also included appointed members as "qualified personalities" and ex officio members.

== Consular advisors and delegates ==
Consular advisors serve on consular councils at each embassy and consular post. They can offer opinions on matters concerning French citizens living abroad. Consular delegates, elected simultaneously with the advisors, help balance population disparities between districts. Together with consular advisors, senators, and deputies representing French citizens abroad, they form the electoral college responsible for electing senators representing French citizens abroad.

Additionally, consular advisors elect 90 of their members to sit in the Assembly of French Citizens Abroad.

== Electoral system ==
The 443 consular advisors are elected by direct universal suffrage in each consular district, with the number of advisors per district ranging from 1 to 9 based on the number of registered French citizens in the district. They are elected for a six-year term.
