= 2014 Zlín by-election =

January 2014 Czech senate by-election
- Turnout: 23.3% (1st round); 16.4% (2nd round)
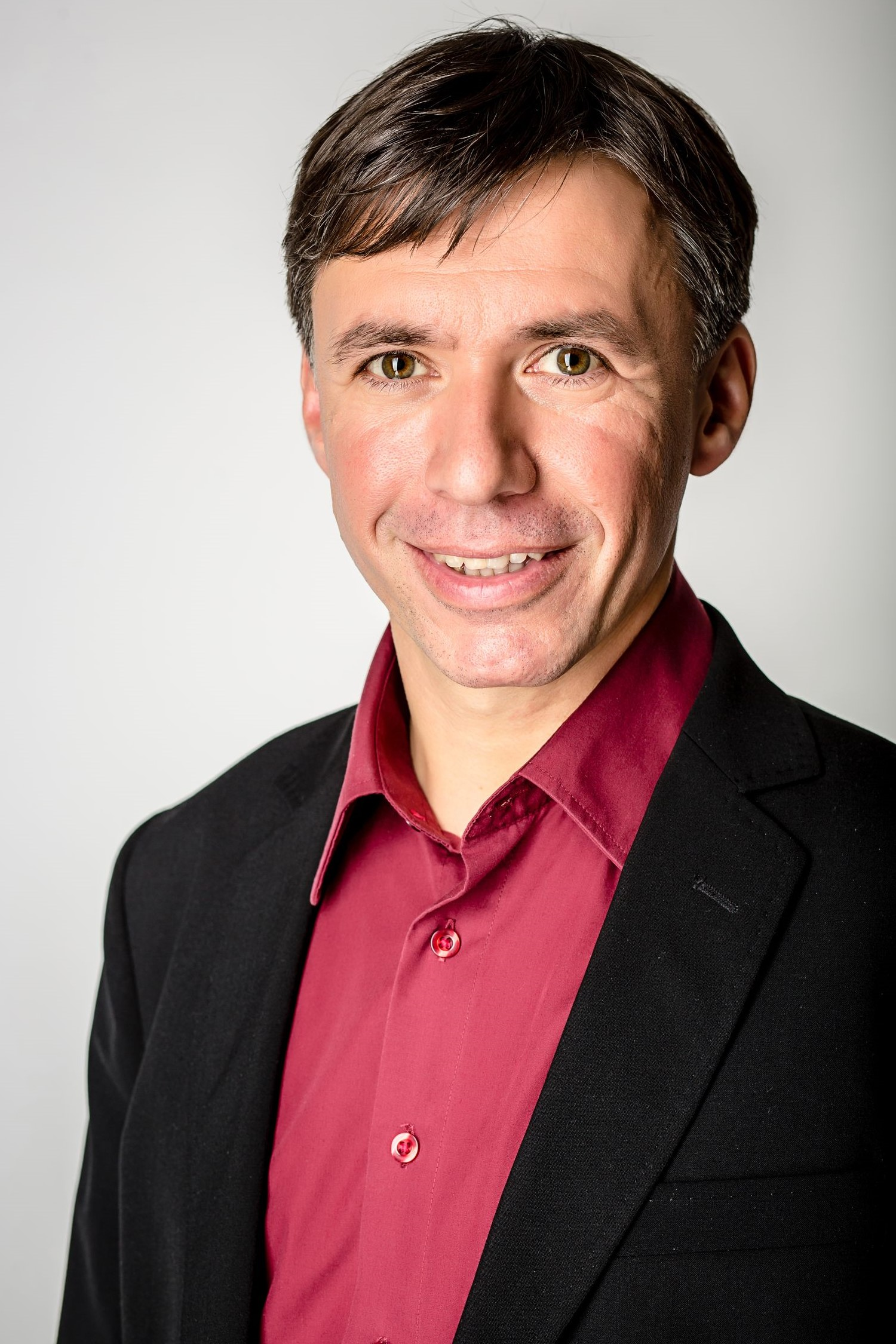

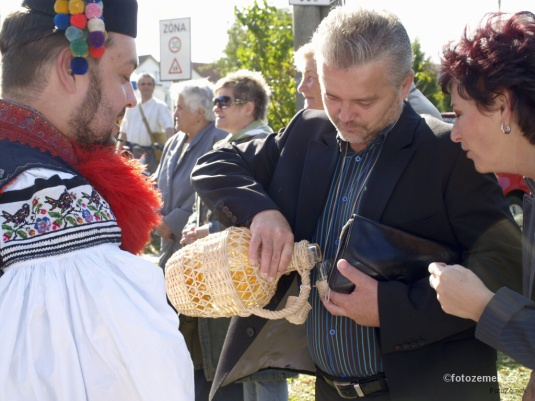
	First party	Second party
Candidate	Patrik Kunčar	Libor Lukáš
Party	Lidovci	ODS
Popular vote	10,161	5,925
Percentage	63.2%	36.8%

A by-election for the Zlín Senate seat was held in the Czech Republic on 10–11 January and 17–18 January. The election was held after Tomio Okamura was elected member of Chamber of Deputies. The election was won by Patrik Kunčar who faced Libor Lukáš in second round. Okamura's candidate Pavel Talaš was eliminated in the first round.

== Results ==
Candidate	Party	First round		Second round	
Candidate	Party	Votes	%	Votes	%
Patrik Kunčar	KDU-ČSL	5,363	23.36	10,161	63.16
Libor Lukáš	ODS	3,792	16.52	5,925	36.83
Milena Kovaříková	ČSSD	3,695	16.09		
Pavel Talaš	ÚSVIT	2,967	12.92		
Jana Juřenčáková	Independent	2,949	12.84		
Radomír Rafaja	KSČM	1,686	7.34		
Zuzana Lapčíková	STAN	1,613	7.02		
Jiří Remeš	SSO	529	5.20		
Luděk Maděra	Pirates	359	1.56		
