= 2014 Wyoming elections =

A general election was held in the U.S. state of Wyoming on November 4, 2014. All of Wyoming's executive officers were up for election as well as a United States Senate seat and Wyoming's at-large seat in the United States House of Representatives. Primary elections were held on August 19, 2014.

== Governor ==
Incumbent Republican Governor Matt Mead ran for re-election to a second term in office. He was challenged in the primary by physician and rancher Taylor Haynes and Superintendent of Public Instruction Cindy Hill, defeating them by 54% to 32% to 13%.

In the general election, he defeated former Chairman of the Wyoming Democratic Party Pete Gosar, Independent Don Wills and Libertarian Dee Cozzens by 58% to 27% to 6% to 2%.

== Secretary of State ==
=== Republican primary ===
==== Candidates ====
- Ed Murray, businessman
- Ed Buchanan, former Speaker of the Wyoming House of Representatives
- Pete Illoway, former State Representative
- Clark Stith, Rock Springs City Councilman

Republican primary results
| Party | Candidate | Votes | % |
|---|---|---|---|
| Republican | Ed Murray | 32,944 | 33.17 |
| Republican | Ed Buchanan | 31,312 | 31.53 |
| Republican | Pete Illoway | 16,596 | 16.71 |
| Republican | Clark Stith | 8,511 | 8.57 |
| Republican | Write-in | 274 | 0.28 |
| Republican | Over Votes | 42 | 0.04 |
| Republican | Under Votes | 9,633 | 9.7 |
| Total votes | | 99,312 | 100 |

=== Democratic primary ===
No Democrat announced their candidacy for Secretary of State.

Democratic primary results
| Party | Candidate | Votes | % |
|---|---|---|---|
| Democratic | Write-in | 769 | 4.2 |
| Democratic | Over Votes | 0 | 0 |
| Democratic | Under Votes | 17,537 | 99.8 |
| Total votes | | 18,306 | 100 |

=== General election ===
Results by county Murray: 70–80%; 80–90%

Wyoming Secretary of State election, 2014
| Party | Candidate | Votes | % |
|---|---|---|---|
| Republican | Ed Murray | 119,772 | 69.98 |
| Constitution | Jennifer Young | 18,918 | 11.05 |
| Libertarian | Kit Carson | 16,858 | 9.85 |
| Write-in | Other | 859 | 0.5 |
| Over Votes | Other | 47 | 0.5 |
| Under Votes | Other | 14,699 | 8.59 |
| Total votes | | 171,153 | 100 |

== State Treasurer ==
=== Republican primary ===
==== Candidates ====
- Mark Gordon, incumbent State Treasurer
- Ron Redo

Republican primary results
| Party | Candidate | Votes | % |
|---|---|---|---|
| Republican | Mark Gordon | 72,095 | 72.59 |
| Republican | Ron Redo | 9,945 | 10.01 |
| Republican | Write-in | 206 | 0.21 |
| Republican | Over Votes | 6 | 0.01 |
| Republican | Under Votes | 17,060 | 17.18 |
| Total votes | | 99,312 | 100 |

=== Democratic primary ===
No Democrat announced their candidacy for State Treasurer.

Democratic primary results
| Party | Candidate | Votes | % |
|---|---|---|---|
| Democratic | Write-in | 498 | 2.72 |
| Democratic | Over Votes | 0 | 0 |
| Democratic | Under Votes | 17,808 | 97.28 |
| Total votes | | 18,306 | 100 |

=== General election ===
Results by county Gordon: 90–100%

Wyoming State Treasurer election, 2014
| Party | Candidate | Votes | % |
|---|---|---|---|
| Republican | Mark Gordon | 138,831 | 81.12 |
| Write-in | Other | 1,262 | 0.74 |
| Over Votes | Other | 16 | 0.01 |
| Under Votes | Other | 31,044 | 18.14 |
| Total votes | | 171,153 | 100 |

== State Auditor ==
=== Republican primary ===
==== Candidates ====
- Cynthia Cloud, incumbent State Auditor

Republican primary results
| Party | Candidate | Votes | % |
|---|---|---|---|
| Republican | Cynthia Cloud | 79,683 | 80.24 |
| Republican | Write-in | 397 | 0.4 |
| Republican | Over Votes | 3 | 0 |
| Republican | Under Votes | 19,229 | 19.36 |
| Total votes | | 99,312 | 100 |

=== Democratic primary ===
No Democrat announced their candidacy for State Auditor.

Democratic primary results
| Party | Candidate | Votes | % |
|---|---|---|---|
| Democratic | Write-in | 468 | 2.56 |
| Democratic | Over Votes | 0 | 0 |
| Democratic | Under Votes | 17,838 | 97.44 |
| Total votes | | 18,306 | 100 |

=== General election ===
Results by county Cloud: 90–100%

Wyoming State Auditor election, 2014
| Party | Candidate | Votes | % |
|---|---|---|---|
| Republican | Cynthia Cloud | 138,216 | 80.76 |
| Write-in | Other | 1,325 | 0.77 |
| Over Votes | Other | 15 | 0.01 |
| Under Votes | Other | 31,597 | 18.46 |
| Total votes | | 171,153 | 100 |

== Superintendent of Public Instruction ==
This was the last statewide election in Wyoming in which Laramie County voted for the Democratic nominee.

=== Republican primary ===
==== Candidates ====
- Jillian Balow, Wyoming Department of Family Services administrator
- Sheryl Lain, retired teacher
- Bill Winney, candidate for the Wyoming House of Representatives in 2010 and 2012

Republican primary results
| Party | Candidate | Votes | % |
|---|---|---|---|
| Republican | Jillian Balow | 35,493 | 35.74 |
| Republican | Sheryl Lain | 27,357 | 27.55 |
| Republican | Bill Winney | 23,105 | 23.27 |
| Republican | Write-in | 273 | 0.27 |
| Republican | Over Votes | 23 | 0.02 |
| Republican | Under Votes | 13,061 | 13.15 |
| Total votes | | 99,312 | 100 |

=== Democratic primary ===
==== Candidates ====
- Mike Ceballos, businessman

Democratic primary results
| Party | Candidate | Votes | % |
|---|---|---|---|
| Democratic | Mike Ceballos | 14,733 | 80.48 |
| Democratic | Write-in | 131 | 0.72 |
| Democratic | Over Votes | 1 | 0.01 |
| Democratic | Under Votes | 3,441 | 18.8 |
| Total votes | | 18,306 | 100 |

=== General election ===
Results by county Balow: 50–60%; 60–70%; 70–80%; 80–90%; Ceballos: 50–60%

Wyoming Superintendent of Public Instruction election, 2014
| Party | Candidate | Votes | % |
|---|---|---|---|
| Republican | Jillian Balow | 99,244 | 57.99 |
| Democratic | Mike Ceballos | 62,208 | 36.35 |
| Write-in | Other | 894 | 0.52 |
| Over Votes | Other | 49 | 0.03 |
| Under Votes | Other | 8,758 | 5.12 |
| Total votes | | 171,153 | 100 |

== United States Senate ==
Incumbent Republican senator Mike Enzi ran for re-election to a fourth term in office.

He defeated Democrat Charlie Hardy, Independent Curt Gottshall and Libertarian Joseph Porambo in the general election.

== United States House of Representatives ==
Wyoming has a single at-large congressional district. Incumbent Republican U.S. representative Cynthia Lummis, who has represented the state in Congress since 2011, ran for re-election to a third term in office.

She defeated Democrat Richard Grayson in the general election.
