= Elections in Sark =

Since 2008, Elections in Sark take place every two years to elect 14 members (called Conseillers) of the Chief Pleas, the parliament of Sark, to serve a four-year term in a rolling election cycle.

The 2008 constitutional arrangement replaced the previous arrangement which was set up in 1922. The first elections to Chief Pleas took place in 1922 when 12 Deputies of the people were added to the property-owning Tenants. Both men and women were enfranchised in the 1922 reform, although equalisation of voting age and the granting of full rights to married women occurred later.

On 16 January and 21 February 2008, the Chief Pleas approved a law which introduced a 30-member chamber, with 28 elected members, and two unelected leaders, the Seigneur and the Seneschal. As a transitional measure, all 28 Conseillers were elected at the 2008 election; and after the results were declared, another ballot was held among the 28 successful Conseillers to determine who would serve a two-year term, and who a four-year term.

Voters are eligible to be enrolled on the electoral roll of Sark if they are:

- 16 or over
- have been ordinarily resident in Sark for 24 months continuously
- are ordinarily resident in Sark, and
- are not subject to a legal disability.

== See also ==
- Politics of Sark
