= 2014 Los Angeles County Board of Supervisors election =

2014 Los Angeles County Board of Supervisors elections

3 of the 5 seats of the Los Angeles County Board of Supervisors
	Majority party	Minority party
Party	Democratic	Republican
Seats before	3	2
Seats won	2	0
Seats after	3	2
Seat change	Steady	Steady
- Results of the elections: Democratic hold No election

The 2014 Los Angeles County Board of Supervisors elections were held on June 3, 2014. Two of the five seats (for the First and Third Districts) of the Los Angeles County Board of Supervisors were contested in this election. A run-off election was held for the Third District on November 4, 2014, as no single candidate failed to reach a majority vote.

Gloria Molina and Zev Yaroslavsky, incumbent Supervisors for the First and Third Districts respectively, were termed out.

== Results ==
=== First District ===
2014 Los Angeles County Board of Supervisors election District 1

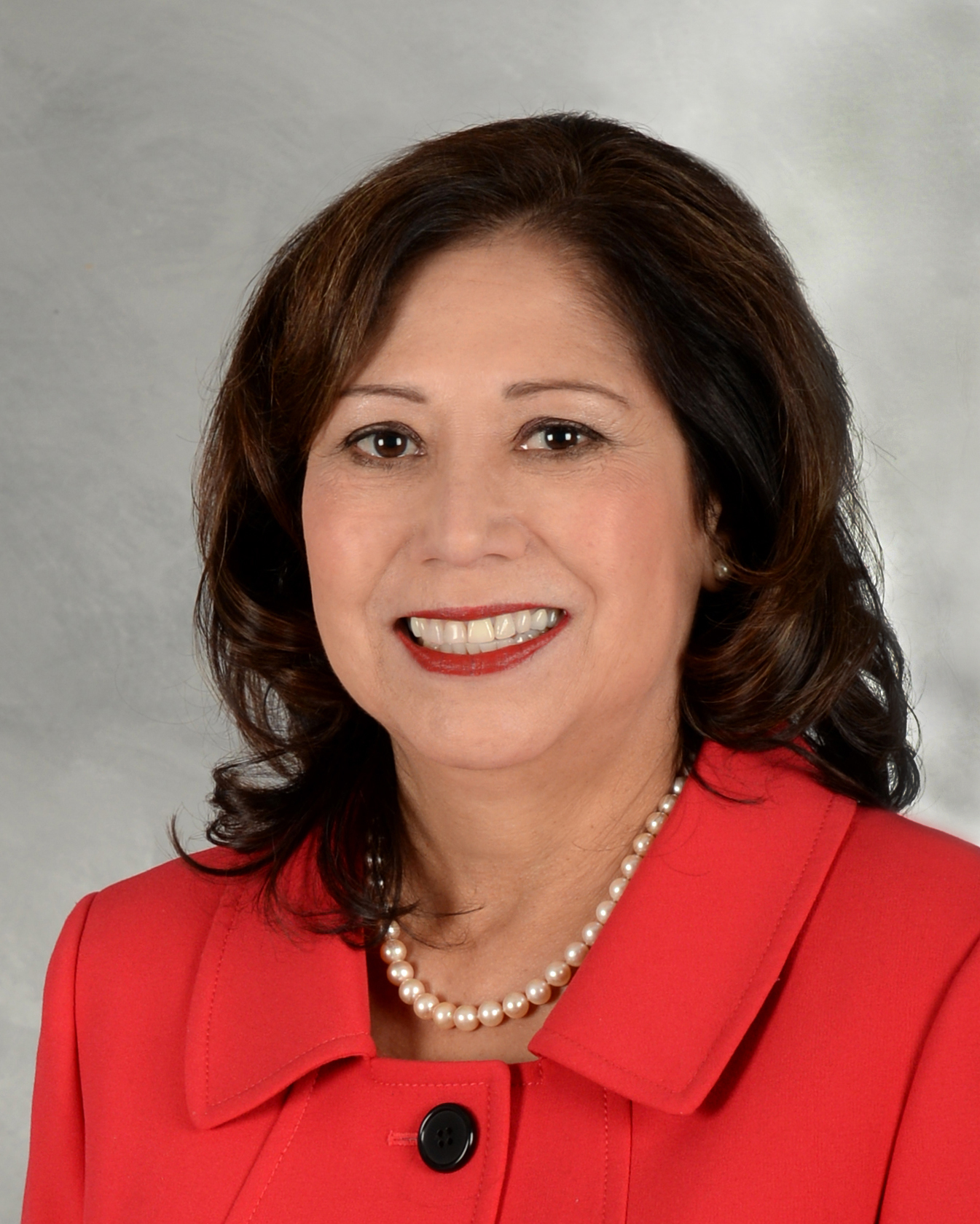

Candidate	Hilda Solis	A.A. Saucedo Hood
Popular vote	61,204	13,975
Percentage	70.13%	16.01%
Candidate	Juventino Gomez
Popular vote	12,095
Percentage	13.86%
Supervisor before election
Gloria Molina
Supervisor
Hilda Solis

1st District supervisorial election, 2014
Candidate	Votes	%
Hilda Solis	61,204	70.13
A.A. Saucedo Hood	13,975	16.01
Juventino Gomez	12,095	13.86
Turnout	{{{votes}}}	10.98%
Total votes	87,274	100.00

=== Third District ===
==== June 3, 2014 election ====
2014 Los Angeles County Board of Supervisors election District 3

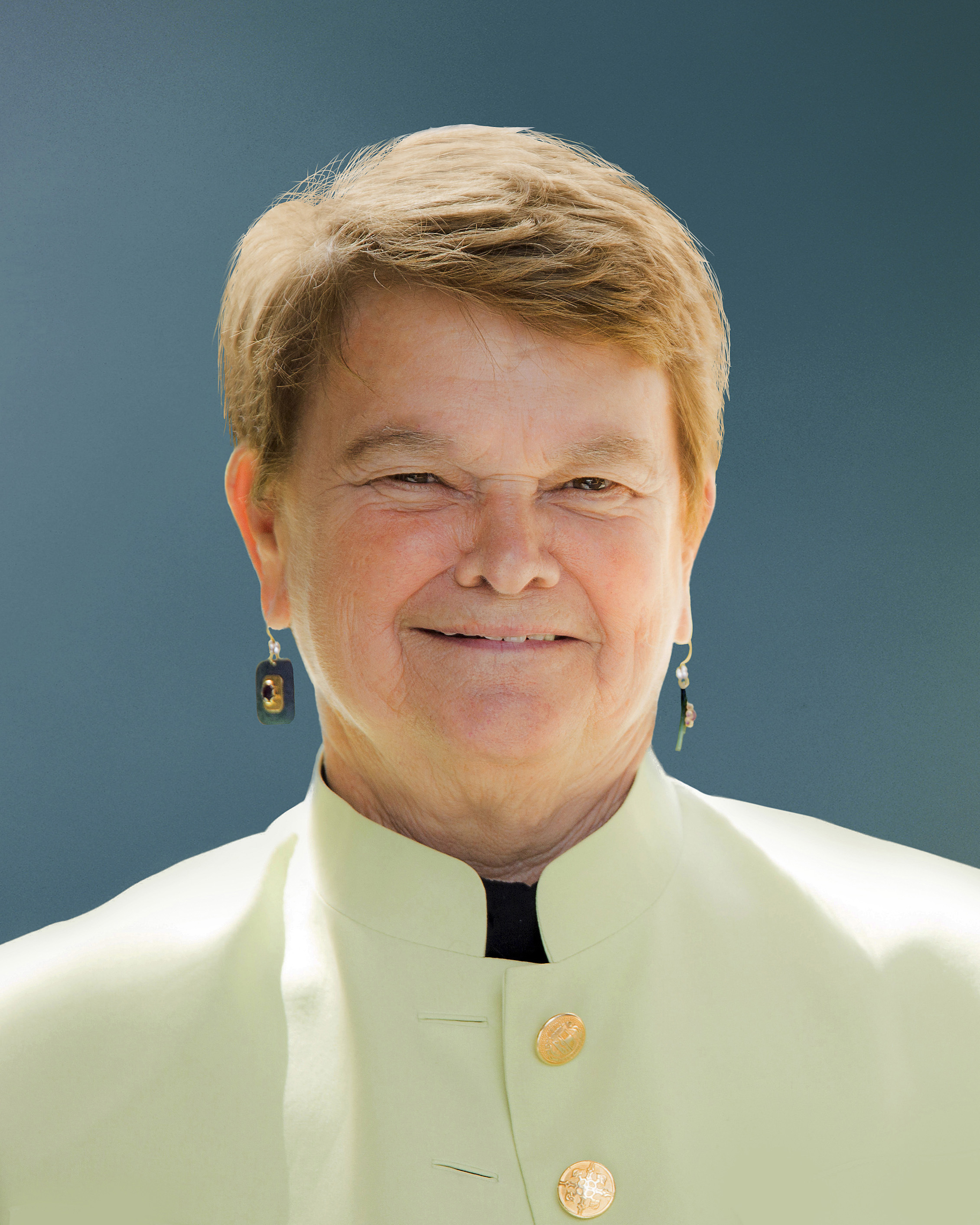

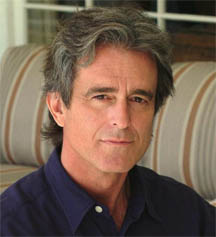

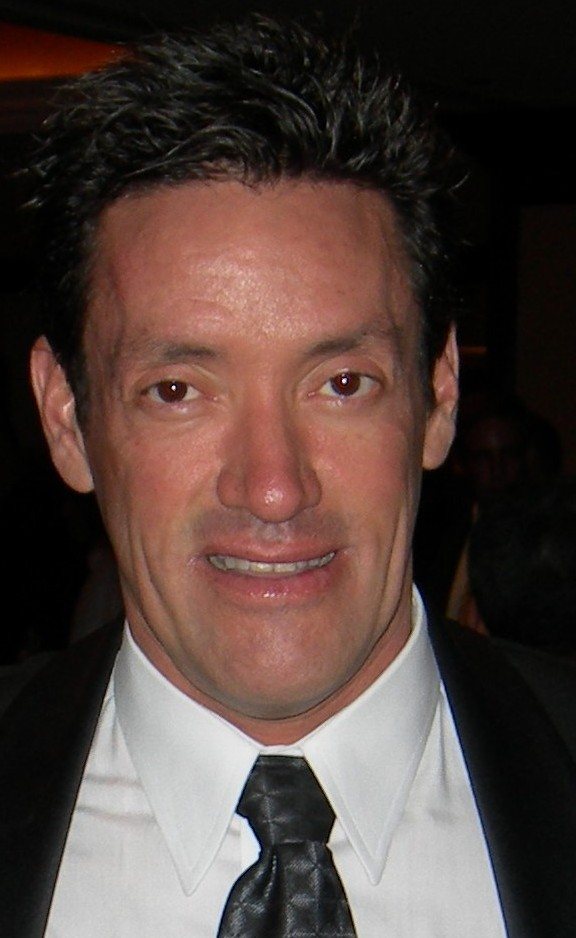

Candidate	Sheila Kuehl	Bobby Shriver
Popular vote	52,059	35,427
Percentage	52.89%	47.11%
Candidate	John Duran	P Conley Ulich
Popular vote	25,532	10,079
Percentage	16.37%	6.46%
Supervisor before election
Zev Yaroslavsky
Supervisor
Sheila Kuehl

3rd District supervisorial election, 2014
Candidate	Votes	%
Sheila Kuehl	56,076	35.96
Bobby Shriver	45,487	29.17
John Duran	25,532	16.37
P Conley Ulich	10,079	6.46
Rudy Melendez	5,777	3.70
Doug Fay	5,404	3.47
Yuval D Kremer	5,125	3.29
Eric Preven	2,448	1.57
Turnout	{{{votes}}}	5.45%
Total votes	155,928	100.00

==== November, 2014 run-off election ====
3rd District supervisorial election, 2014
Candidate	Votes	%
Sheila Kuehl	52,059	52.89
Bobby Shriver	35,427	47.11
Turnout	{{{votes}}}	8.45%
Total votes	87,486	100.00
