= 2014 Sint Eustatius status referendum =

A status referendum was held in Sint Eustatius on 17 December 2014. Sint Eustatius had become a Dutch public body upon the dissolution of the Netherlands Antilles in 2010, despite this not being the status voted for, and so the 2014 referendum was supported as a way to resolve this. Although a majority of those voting opted for increased autonomy within the Kingdom of the Netherlands, voter turnout was well below the 60% required for the referendum to be binding.

== Background ==
The decision to hold a referendum was approved by the Island Council on 8 October and supported by the United People's Party the Statia Liberal Action Movement independent MP Reuben Merkman. On 25 October the date was set for 17 December, with only the Democratic Party opposed.

== Question ==
Voters were presented with four options:

1. Remain a public body
2. Independence
3. Autonomy within the Kingdom of the Netherlands
4. Integration into the Netherlands

== Result ==
Choice	Votes	%
Autonomy	747	65.53
Public body (status quo)	374	32.81
Integration	14	1.23
Independence	5	0.44
Invalid/blank votes	16	–
Total	1,156	100
Registered voters/turnout	2,546	45.40
Source: Saba News
