= Elections in Republika Srpska =

Republika Srpska elects on a national level a legislature and a president. The National Assembly of the Republika Srpska (Narodna skupština Republike Srpske) has 83 members elected for a four-year term. Republika Srpska has a multi-party system, with numerous parties in which no one party usually has a chance of gaining power alone, and parties must work with each other to form coalition governments. A party must receive at least 3% of the votes in one of the nine electoral districts to qualify for any seats.

== 2014 elections ==
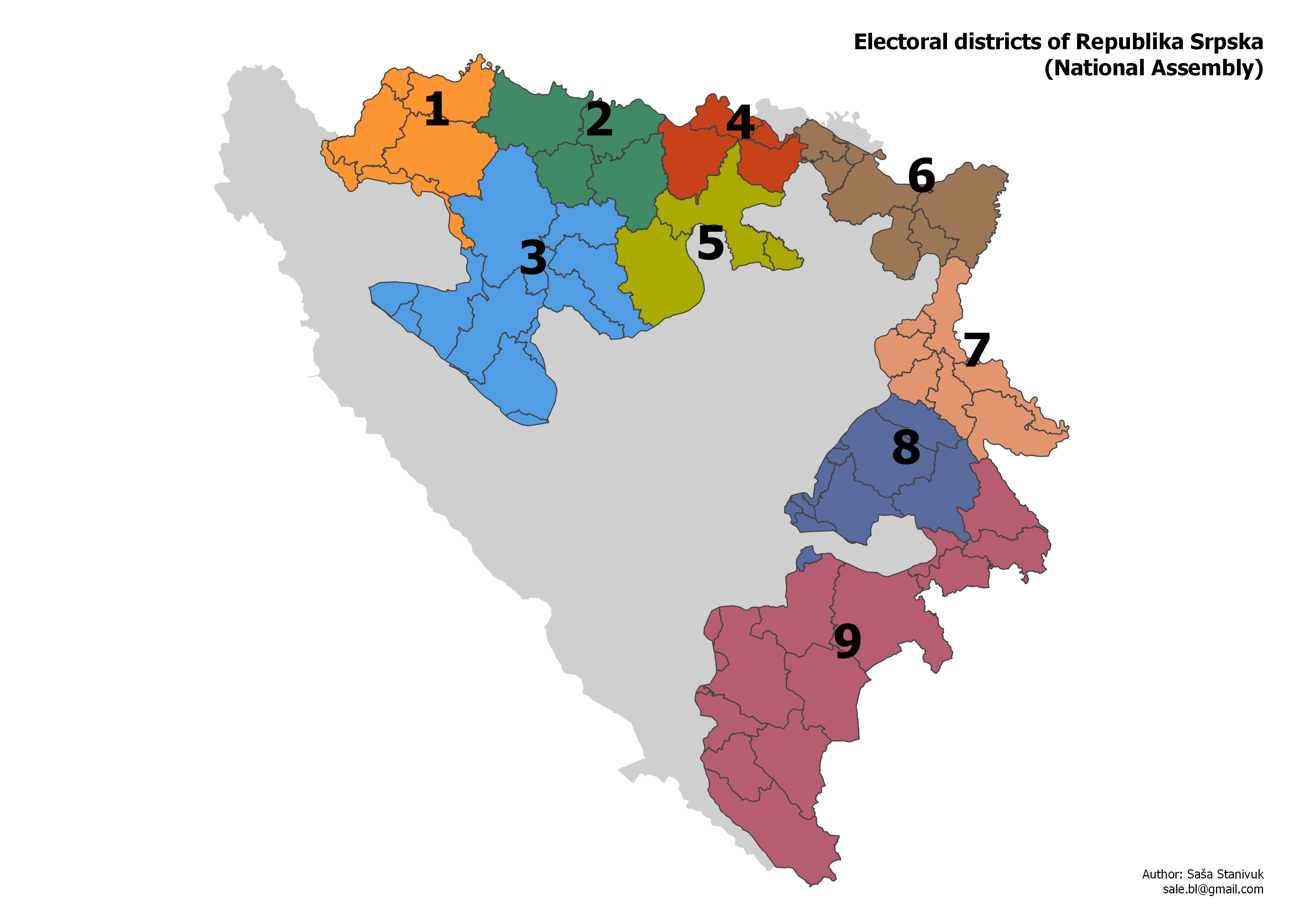
New electoral districts for National Assembly of Republika Srpska (2014)

In the 2014 general elections in Republika Srpska, the incumbent President Milorad Dodik was re-elected, running on a joint Alliance of Independent Social Democrats–Democratic People's Alliance–Socialist Party platform, whilst his Alliance of Independent Social Democrats remained the largest in the National Assembly.
