= 2014 San Francisco Board of Supervisors election =

- November 4, 2014

The 2014 San Francisco Board of Supervisors elections occurred on November 4, 2014. Five of the eleven seats of the San Francisco Board of Supervisors were contested in this election. Incumbents in all five districts successfully ran for re-election.

Municipal elections in California are officially non-partisan, though most candidates in San Francisco do receive funding and support from various political parties. The election was held using ranked-choice voting.

== Results ==
=== District 2 ===

This district consists of the Marina, Cow Hollow, Pacific Heights, Seacliff, Lake District, Presidio Heights, Jordan Park, Laurel Heights, Presidio, and part of Russian Hill. Supervisor Mark Farrell successfully won re-election.

District 2 supervisorial election, 2014
Candidate	Votes	%
Mark Farrell (incumbent)	15,546	78.61
Juan-Antonio Carballo	4,090	20.68
Write-in	141	0.71
Total votes	19,777	100

=== District 4 ===

District 4 consists of the Central Sunset, Outer Sunset, Parkside, Outer Parkside, and Pine Lake Park. Supervisor Katy Tang won re-election to the Board of Supervisors after first being appointed to the Board in 2013.

District 4 supervisorial election, 2014
Candidate	Votes	%
Katy Tang (incumbent)	14,981	96.7
Write-in	511	3.3
Total votes	15,492	100

=== District 6 ===

District 6 consists of the Union Square, Tenderloin, Civic Center, Mid-Market, Cathedral Hill, South of Market, South Beach, and Mission Bay.

District 6 supervisorial election, 2014
Candidate	Votes	%
Jane Kim (incumbent)	8,827	67.42
Michael Nulty	1,467	11.21
Jamie Whitaker	1,458	11.14
David Carlos Salaverry	1,210	9.24
Write-in	119	0.91
Write-in Rodney Hauge	11	0.08
Total votes	13,092	100

=== District 8 ===

District 8 consists of The Castro, Noe Valley, Diamond Heights, Glen Park, Corona Heights, Eureka Valley, Dolores Heights, Mission Dolores, Duboce Triangle, Buena Vista Park, and part of Twin Peaks.

District 8 supervisorial election, 2014
Candidate	Votes	%
Scott Wiener (incumbent)	22,854	77.67
Michael Petrelis	2,004	6.81
Tommy Basso	1,574	5.35
George Davis	1,372	4.66
John Nulty	1,359	4.62
Write-in	261	0.89
Total votes	29,424	100.00

=== District 10 ===

District 10 consists of Potrero Hill, Central Waterfront, Dogpatch, Bayview-Hunters Point, Bayview Heights, India Basin, Silver Terrace, Candlestick Point, Visitacion Valley, Little Hollywood, Sunnydale, and McLaren Park.

District 10 supervisorial election, 2014
Candidate	Votes	%
Malia Cohen (incumbent)	7,141	46.49
Tony Kelly	3,688	24.01
Marlene Tran	2,704	17.6
Shawn M. Richard	986	6.42
Ed Donaldson	793	5.16
Write-in	48	0.31
Total votes	15,360	100.00
