= 2014 in Japan =

- Decades: 1990s; 2000s; 2010s; 2020s
- See also: Other events of 2014; History of Japan • Timeline • Years

Events in the year 2014 in Japan.

== Incumbents ==
- Emperor: Akihito
- Prime Minister: Shinzō Abe (L–Yamaguchi)
- Chief Cabinet Secretary: Yoshihide Suga (L–Kanagawa)
- Chief Justice of the Supreme Court: Hironobu Takesaki until March 31, Itsurō Terada from April 1
- President of the House of Representatives: Bunmei Ibuki (L–Kyōto) until November 21, Nobutaka Machimura (L–Hokkaidō) from December 24
- President of the House of Councillors: Masaaki Yamazaki (L–Fukui)
- Diet sessions: 186th (regular, January 26 to June 22), 187th (extraordinary, September 29 to November 21), 188th (special, December 24 to 26)

=== Governors ===
- Aichi Prefecture: Hideaki Omura
- Akita Prefecture: Norihisa Satake
- Aomori Prefecture: Shingo Mimura
- Chiba Prefecture: Kensaku Morita
- Ehime Prefecture: Tokihiro Nakamura
- Fukui Prefecture: Issei Nishikawa
- Fukuoka Prefecture: Hiroshi Ogawa
- Fukushima Prefecture: Yūhei Satō (until 11 November); Masao Uchibori (starting 11 November)
- Gifu Prefecture: Hajime Furuta
- Gunma Prefecture: Masaaki Osawa
- Hiroshima Prefecture: Hidehiko Yuzaki
- Hokkaido: Harumi Takahashi
- Hyogo Prefecture: Toshizō Ido
- Ibaraki: Masaru Hashimoto
- Ishikawa: Masanori Tanimoto
- Iwate Prefecture: Takuya Tasso
- Kagawa Prefecture: Keizō Hamada
- Kagoshima Prefecture: Satoshi Mitazono
- Kanagawa Prefecture: Yuji Kuroiwa
- Kochi Prefecture: Masanao Ozaki
- Kumamoto Prefecture: Ikuo Kabashima
- Kyoto Prefecture: Keiji Yamada
- Mie Prefecture: Eikei Suzuki
- Miyagi Prefecture: Yoshihiro Murai
- Miyazaki Prefecture: Shunji Kōno
- Nagano Prefecture: Shuichi Abe
- Nagasaki Prefecture: Hōdō Nakamura
- Nara Prefecture: Shōgo Arai
- Niigata Prefecture: Hirohiko Izumida
- Oita Prefecture: Katsusada Hirose
- Okayama Prefecture: Ryuta Ibaragi
- Okinawa Prefecture: Hirokazu Nakaima (until 9 December); Takeshi Onaga (starting 10 December)
- Osaka Prefecture: Ichirō Matsui
- Saga Prefecture: Yasushi Furukawa (until 25 November); Hiroki Sakai (starting 25 November)
- Saitama Prefecture: Kiyoshi Ueda
- Shiga Prefecture: Yukiko Kada (until 20 July); Taizō Mikazuki (starting 20 July)
- Shiname Prefecture: Zenbe Mizoguchi
- Shizuoka Prefecture: Heita Kawakatsu
- Tochigi Prefecture: Tomikazu Fukuda
- Tokushima Prefecture: Kamon Iizumi
- Tokyo: Tatsumi Ando (until 25 February); Yōichi Masuzoe (starting 25 February)
- Tottori Prefecture: Shinji Hirai
- Toyama Prefecture: Takakazu Ishii
- Wakayama Prefecture: Yoshinobu Nisaka
- Yamagata Prefecture: Mieko Yoshimura
- Yamaguchi Prefecture: Tsugumasa Muraoka
- Yamanashi Prefecture: Shōmei Yokouchi

== Events ==
=== Electoral calendar ===
- National elections
  - (if necessary) April and October: By-elections to both houses of the National Diet
  - 2014 Japanese general election
- Prefectural elections (gubernatorial and general assembly elections only, not including assembly by-elections)
  - February 2: Nagasaki gubernatorial
  - February 9: Tokyo gubernatorial
  - February 23: Yamaguchi gubernatorial
  - March 16: Ishikawa gubernatorial
  - April 6: Kyoto gubernatorial
  - in or before July (expires July 19): Shiga gubernatorial
  - in or before August (expires August 31): Nagano gubernatorial
  - in or before September (expires September 4): Kagawa gubernatorial
  - in or before November (expires November 11): Fukushima gubernatorial
  - in or before November (expires November 30): Ehime gubernatorial
  - in or before December (expires December 9): Okinawa gubernatorial
  - in or before December (expires December 16): Wakayama gubernatorial
  - in or before January 2015 (expires January 7, 2015; previous election in December 2010): Ibaraki assembly
  - in or before January 2015 (expires January 20, 2015; previous election in December 2010): Miyazaki gubernatorial
- Municipal elections in designated major cities and special wards (not including assembly by-elections)
  - June 8: Nakano City mayoral
  - in or before July (expires July 10): Suginami City mayoral
  - in or before October (expires October 7): Shinagawa City mayoral
  - in or before November (expires November 23): Shinjuku City mayoral
  - in or before November (expires November 17): Niigata City mayoral
  - in or before November (expires December 2): Kumamoto City mayoral
  - in or before December (expires December 6): Fukuoka City mayoral

Additional early elections may be caused by resignations, deaths, recalls, no-confidence votes, etc.

=== Other Events ===
  - January 9 – Mitsubishi Materials Yokkaichi plant explosion, kills five persons, with injures 12 in Mie Prefecture.
  - January 25–2, 013 frozen food pesticide contamination incident, in Gunma Prefecture, arrested on suspicion of fraudulent means obstruction of business man of contract employees was mixed the pesticide malathion by Japanese authority.
  - February – 2014 Japan heavy snowfall, according to Fire and Disaster Management Agency in Japan confirmed report, 95 persons fatalities, with 1,770 are injures, most of the victims is the snow removal work during the snow removal of the roof.
  - February 15–2, 014 Motosumiyoshi commuter trains accident, injures 19 people in Tokyu Toyoko Line, Kawasaki, Kanagawa Prefecture.
  - March 5 – 2012–2013 PC remote control incident in Japan, a suspect man of 31-year-old bail for the first time in almost a year from the Tokyo Detention Center of the receiving destination, however, the prosecution claimed the bail revocation on May 19, suspects the Tokyo District Court, a suspect man imprisoned in the Tokyo Detention Center on May 20.
  - March 8 – Abeno Harukas open in Abeno-ku, Osaka, the tallest (exclude freestanding) structure in Japan.
  - March 31 – In court that the International Court of Justice, the world complained as the International Convention for the Regulation of Whaling violation research whaling in the Antarctic Ocean in Japan, research whaling in Japan said, "not for research purposes", and certification treaty violation, ruling order so that it is not carried out in future.
  - April 1 – Consumption tax is up to 8% from 5% since 1997.
  - August 20 – 2014 Hiroshima landslides, according to official confirmed report, 74 people fatalities in Asakita-ku, Hiroshima.
  - August 27 – According to Ministry of Health, Labour, and Welfare official confirmed report, a first dengue fever patient cases in the country since 1945, or later, 153 people are same symptoms by October, mainly, Tokyo metropolitan area.
  - September 27 – 2014 eruption of Mount Ontake, according to official confirmed report, 63 people fatalities and worst eruption disaster since 1991.
  - November 22 – A magnitude 6.2 earthquake injured 46 people in Hakuba, Nagano Prefecture, according to a Fire and Disaster Management Agency official.
  - December 3 – An asteroid sample return mission Hayabusa2 launched from Tanegashima Space Center, Kagoshima prefecture.

== The Nobel Prize ==
- Isamu Akasaki, Shuji Nakamura, and Hiroshi Amano: 2014 Nobel Prize in Physics winners.

== Popular culture ==
=== Arts and entertainment ===
For events in anime, see 2014 in anime. For events in manga, see 2014 in manga. For events in music, see 2014 in Japanese music. For events in television, see 2014 in Japanese television. For Japanese films released this year, see List of Japanese films of 2014 and for films that reached number-one at the Japanese box office, see List of 2014 box office number-one films in Japan.

=== Sports ===
For the Japanese participation in the 2014 Winter Olympics, see Japan at the 2014 Winter Olympics.

== Deaths ==
=== January ===
- January 1 – Tokuo Yamashita, 94, politician, Minister of Health, Labour and Welfare, natural causes.
- January 2
  - Higashifushimi Kunihide, 103, Buddhist monk.
  - Yōko Mitsui, 78, poet, liver failure.
- January 3
  - Yashiki Takajin, 64, singer-songwriter and television presenter, esophageal cancer.
  - Yasuki Hamano, 62, anime media expert and university professor, stroke.
- January 4 – Shigeyuki Imai, 81, composer, esophageal cancer.
- January 6 – Tesshin Okada, 21, boxer, subdural hematoma.
- January 11 – Keiko Awaji, 80, actress (Stray Dog, The Bridges at Toko-Ri), esophageal cancer.
- January 12 – Tsunetoshi Tanaka, 88, politician, member of the House of Representatives (1969–1972, 1980–1996).
- January 15 – Hiroshi Yoshino, 87, poet, pneumonia.
- January 16
  - Masahide Sakuma, 61, musician (Plastics) and music producer (Glay and Judy and Mary), stomach cancer.
  - Masaya Takahashi, 83, actor, respiratory failure.
  - Hiroo Onoda, 91, Imperial Army World War II intelligence officer, did not surrender until 1974, heart failure due to complications of pneumonia.
- January 17
  - Saizo Kishimoto, 85, yakuza (Yamaguchi-gumi).
  - Seizō Katō, 86, voice actor, bladder cancer.
- January 18 – Takao Iwami, 78, Japanese political pundit, pneumonia.
- January 19
  - Yukio Funai, 81, management consultant, pneumonia.
  - Tsutomu Kawabuchi, 88, ice hockey player and coach, IIHF Hall of Fame.
- January 20
  - Kiyoharu Ishiwata, 73, politician, member of the House of Councilors (1989–2001), heart failure.
  - Tsuyoshi Nara, 81, linguist (Bengali scholar), lung cancer.
- January 23
  - Umon Sanyūtei, 65, rakugo comedian, stomach cancer.
  - Katsuyo Kobayashi, 76, food critic (Iron Chef), multiple organ failure.
- January 27
  - Masaaki Tsukada, 74, voice actor (Bleach, One Piece).
  - Ichirō Nagai, 82, voice actor (Sazae-san, Space Battleship Yamato), heart attack due to coronary artery disease.
  - Masako Bandō, 55, novelist, winner of the Naoki Prize (1996).
- January 28
  - Kazuhiko Sakazaki, 76, baseball player (Yomiuri Giants), stomach cancer.
  - Gudo Wafu Nishijima, 94, Zen Buddhist priest and teacher.

=== February ===
- February 3 – Hiroyuki Suzuki, 68, architectural historian, pneumonia.
- February 6 – Tōru Mori, 78, baseball player, hepatocellular carcinoma.
- February 10 – Hōzan Yamamoto, 76, musician.
- February 13 – Ken'ichi Yamamoto, 57, novelist, lung cancer.
- February 17 – Kokichi Shimoinaba, 87, politician (Minister of Justice), sepsis.
- February 19 – Toshiko D'Elia, 84, Japanese-born American long-distance runner, brain cancer.
- February 26 – Fumio Yamamoto, 79, news presenter, alveolar hemorrhage.
- February 28 – Michio Mado, 104, poet.

=== March ===
- March 8 – Runa Akiyama, 59, voice actress, heart failure.
- March 12 – Kyojin Ōnishi, 97, writer.
- March 14 – Ken Utsui, 82, actor (Super Giant).
- March 16 – Yukio Fujimaki, 54, politician, member of the House of Councillors (since 2012), hemorrhagic shock.
- March 29 – Masato Masuda, 49, video game designer (Fire Pro Wrestling).

=== April ===
- April 11 – Minoru Sano, 63, chef, multiple organ failure.
- April 20 – Yoshio Shinozuka, 90, Imperial Army soldier (Unit 731).

=== May ===
- May 1 – Kōji Yada, 81, voice actor (Dragon Ball Z, GeGeGe no Kitarou (2nd Series), One Piece), kidney failure.
- May 11 – Yuji Kodama, 82, leprosy and human rights activist, lung cancer.
- May 15 – Noribumi Suzuki, 80, film director (Torakku Yarō).
- May 18 – Kaiketsu Masateru, 66, sumo wrestler (Ozeki) and executive, Chairman of the Japan Sumo Association (2010–2012), ischemic heart disease.
- May 25 – Kōichi Ōtani, 90, writer.
- May 27 – Kōji Kojima, 83, Olympic volleyball coach (1972), pneumonia.
- May 29 – Mitsugu Hara, 79, baseball manager, managed two National Championships, heart failure.

=== June ===
- June 1
  - Tarō Naka, 92, poet, pneumonia.
  - Yuri Kochiyama, 93, Japanese American internment camp detainee and civil rights activist, natural causes.
- June 2 – Gorō Nishida, 70, mathematician, septic shock.
- June 3
  - Itsuko Ueda, 85, fashion designer, heart failure.
  - Kaneyasu Marutani, 94, politician, member of the House of Councillors (1977–1989).
- June 4
  - Yasuo Masumoto, 67, industrial and farm machinery executive, chairman and president of Kubota.
  - Ryūzō Hayashi, 70, actor (Early Spring Story), kidney failure.
- June 8
  - Yoshihito, Prince Katsura, 66, royal, acute heart failure.
  - Taruhi Furuta, 86, writer and critic, heart failure.
- June 10 – Sōhei Kondō, 92, genetician, multiple organ failure
- June 11
  - Kunie Iwahashi, 74, writer, peritonitis.
  - Kōbun Kurata, 74, poet, colorectal cancer.
  - Hiroyuki Nakagawa, 77, composer, lung cancer.
  - Fujio Morita, 86, cinematographer (Nemuri Kyoshirō), glioblastoma.
- June 13 – Tadahiko Hirano, 76, baritone, heart attack.
- June 20 – Akio Yokoyama, 83, actor (Otōto), pneumonia.
- June 21
  - Hiroaki Fujii, 88, producer, heart failure.
  - Yukio Fukamachi, 83, producer and director.
  - Chūzō Ichiko, 101, historian.
  - Yozo Ishikawa, 88, politician, Director General of the Defense Agency, member of the House of Representatives for Tokyo, acute respiratory failure.
- June 23 – Ichirō Komatsu, 63, Japanese civil servant and diplomat, Director-General of the Cabinet Legislation Bureau, Ambassador to Switzerland and France.
- June 27 – Haruhiko Saitō, 73, actor (Kaitō Ruby).

=== July ===
- July 3
  - Haruichiban, 47, entertainer, cirrhosis.
  - Mazakazu Koayashi, 44, hang-glider, flight collision during competition.
- July 5 – Masamitsu Iwamoto, 85, politician (House of Councillors), stroke.
- July 9 – Yuzuru Ninagawa, 89, scholar of French literature, pneumonia.
- July 10 – On Kawara, 81, conceptual artist.
- July 14 – Yūsuke Fukada, 82, writer (Naoki Prize), pneumonia.
- July 18
  - Gankurō Ōtaya, 60, entertainer, intracranial hemorrhage.
  - Makoto Sakuma, 79, Self-Defense Forces official, heart attack.
- July 20 – Kazuo Ichiriki, 88, sumo executive, Chairman of Yokozuna Deliberation Council (1999–2001).
- July 25 – Fusao Ōkubo, 92, writer and editor (Gunzo), duodenal papilla cancer.
- July 27 – Kyozan Joshu Sasaki, 107, Japanese-born American Rinzai Zen teacher.
- July 31 – Shigefumi Fukatsu, 46, playwright and theater producer, lung cancer.

=== August ===
- August 3 – Hiroshi Obi, 54, manga artist (Ganbare Goemon), brain stem hemorrhage.
- August 5 – Yoshiki Sasai, 52, biologist (RIKEN), apparent suicide by hanging.
- August 7 – Mitsuo Higashinaka, 90, politician, member of the House of Representatives for Osaka's 2nd District (1969–2000), lung cancer.
- August 9 – Yasuyuki Nakai, 60, baseball player (Yomiuri Giants), esophageal cancer.
- August 12 – Futatsuryū Jun'ichi, 64, sumo wrestler, lung cancer. (death announced on this date)
- August 15 – Harutoshi Funabashi, 66, anti-nuclear activist, subarachnoid hemorrhage.
- August 16 – Gen Kida, philosopher, pneumonia.
- August 17 – Toshio Mishima, 87, singer, hypoxia.
- August 18 – Nobuyuki Sekiyama, 80, politician, member of the House of Representatives for Niigata's 1st district (1983–1996), stomach cancer.
- August 20 – Aiko Miyawaki, 84, sculptor, pancreatic cancer.
- August 26
  - Chūsei Sone 76, film director (Angel Guts: Red Classroom), pneumonia.
  - Masakane Yonekura, 80, actor and stage director, abdominal aortic aneurysm rupture.

=== September ===
- September 4 – Ichirō Satsuki, 95, rōkyoku performer.
- September 6 – Yoko Yamaguchi, 77, songwriter and novelist, winner of the 1985 Naoki Prize, respiratory failure.
- September 7 – Yoshiko Ōtaka, 94, Chinese-born Japanese actress (Eternity) and singer, member of the House of Councillors (1974–1992), heart failure.
- September 10 – Yoshinori Sakai, 69, athlete, lit cauldron at the 1964 Summer Olympics, cerebral hemorrhage.
- September 14 – Takatada Ihara, 85, television producer and director, heart disease.
- September 15 – Iwao Akiyama, 93, printmaker.
- September 17 – Wakachichibu Komei, 75, sumo wrestler.
- September 20 – Kazusuke Ogawa, 84, literary critic, stomach cancer.

=== October ===
- October 2 – Yoshikazu Sakamoto, 87, political scientist, heart failure.
- October 5 – Katsumi Ōyama, 82, stage and television producer (Omoide Zukuri), multiple organ failure.
- October 10 – Ichirō Satake, 86, mathematician, respiratory failure.
- October 17
  - Daisuke Oku, 38, footballer (Jubilo Iwata, Yokohama F. Marinos), traffic collision.
  - Anna Nakagawa, 49, actress (A Sign Days), uterine cancer.
  - Masaru Emoto, 71, author.
- October 21 – Yasumasa Narasaki, 86, politician, member of the House of Councilors (1992–1998), pneumonia.
- October 25 – Peter Baptist Tadamaro Ishigami, 93, Roman Catholic prelate, Bishop of Naha (1972–1997).
- October 26
  - Genpei Akasegawa, 77, author and artist, sepsis.
  - Hisahiko Okazaki, 84, diplomat and political commentator.
- October 28 – Koichiro Kimura, 44, mixed martial artist and professional wrestler, pneumonia.
- October 30 – Mitsuyo Miura, 90, writer, sepsis.
- October 31 – Hitoshi Motoshima, 92, politician, Mayor of Nagasaki (1979–1995).

=== November ===
- November 1 – Kazuko Yanaga, 67, voice actress (Ace wo Nerae!, Armored Trooper Votoms & Yu Yu Hakusho), sepsis.
- November 4 – Admire Rakti, 6, Japanese Thoroughbred racehorse, won Caulfield Cup (2014), cardiac arrest.
- November 6 – Naoki Tanemura, 78, railway writer.
- November 10 – Ken Takakura, 83, actor (The Yakuza, Black Rain), malignant lymphoma.
- November 17 – Rokurō Naya, 82, voice actor (Saint Seiya, Yu Yu Hakusho, Eureka Seven: AO).
- November 28 – Bunta Sugawara, 81, actor (Torakku Yarō, Spirited Away), liver cancer.
- November 30 – Go Seigen, 100, Chinese-born Japanese Go player.

=== December ===
- December 5 – Koichi Kawakita, 72, special effects director (Godzilla vs. Biollante).
- December 13 – Taitetsu Unno, 85, Shin Buddhist scholar and author.

== See also ==
- 2014 in Japanese music
- 2014 in Japanese television
- List of Japanese films of 2014
