= 2016 in Japan =

- Decades: 1990s; 2000s; 2010s; 2020s; 2030s
- See also: Other events of 2016; History of Japan • Timeline • Years

The following lists events that happened during 2016 in Japan.

- Year: Heisei 28

== Incumbents ==
- Emperor: Akihito
- Prime Minister: Shinzō Abe (L–Yamaguchi)
- Chief Cabinet Secretary: Yoshihide Suga (L–Kanagawa)
- Chief Justice of the Supreme Court: Itsurō Terada
- President of the House of Representatives: Tadamori Oshima (L–Aomori)
- President of the House of Councillors: Masaaki Yamazaki (L–Fukui) until July 25, Chūichi Date (L-Hokkaidō) from August 1
- National Diets: 190th (regular session, January 4–June 1), 191st (extraordinary session, August 1–3), 192nd (extraordinary session, September 26–November 30 [unless extended or cut short by lower house dissolution])

=== Governors ===
- Aichi Prefecture: Hideaki Omura
- Akita Prefecture: Norihisa Satake
- Aomori Prefecture: Shingo Mimura
- Chiba Prefecture: Kensaku Morita
- Ehime Prefecture: Tokihiro Nakamura
- Fukui Prefecture: Issei Nishikawa
- Fukuoka Prefecture: Hiroshi Ogawa
- Fukushima Prefecture: Masao Uchibori
- Gifu Prefecture: Hajime Furuta
- Gunma Prefecture: Masaaki Osawa
- Hiroshima Prefecture: Hidehiko Yuzaki
- Hokkaido: Harumi Takahashi
- Hyogo Prefecture: Toshizō Ido
- Ibaraki Prefecture: Masaru Hashimoto
- Ishikawa Prefecture: Masanori Tanimoto
- Iwate Prefecture: Takuya Tasso
- Kagawa Prefecture: Keizō Hamada
- Kagoshima Prefecture: Satoshi Mitazono
- Kanagawa Prefecture: Yuji Kuroiwa
- Kochi Prefecture: Masanao Ozaki
- Kumamoto Prefecture: Ikuo Kabashima
- Kyoto Prefecture: Keiji Yamada
- Mie Prefecture: Eikei Suzuki
- Miyagi Prefecture: Yoshihiro Murai
- Miyazaki Prefecture: Shunji Kōno
- Nagano Prefecture: Shuichi Abe
- Nagasaki Prefecture: Hōdō Nakamura
- Nara Prefecture: Shōgo Arai
- Niigata Prefecture: Hirohiko Izumida (until 27 October); Ryūichi Yoneyama (starting 27 October)
- Oita Prefecture: Katsusada Hirose
- Okayama Prefecture: Ryuta Ibaragi
- Okinawa Prefecture: Takeshi Onaga
- Osaka Prefecture: Ichirō Matsui
- Saga Prefecture: Yoshinori Yamaguchi
- Saitama Prefecture: Kiyoshi Ueda
- Shiga Prefecture: Taizō Mikazuki
- Shiname Prefecture: Zenbe Mizoguchi
- Shizuoka Prefecture: Heita Kawakatsu
- Tochigi Prefecture: Tomikazu Fukuda
- Tokushima Prefecture: Kamon Iizumi
- Tokyo:
  - until 21 June: Yōichi Masuzoe
  - 21 June-2 August: Tatsumi Ando
  - starting 2 August: Yuriko Koike
- Tottori Prefecture: Shinji Hirai
- Toyama Prefecture: Takakazu Ishii
- Wakayama Prefecture: Yoshinobu Nisaka
- Yamagata Prefecture: Mieko Yoshimura
- Yamaguchi Prefecture: Tsugumasa Muraoka
- Yamanashi Prefecture: Hitoshi Gotō

== Events ==
=== January ===
- Record snowfall and the first Sumo tournament win in a decade for a Japanese rikishi, amid turmoil on the Nikkei 225 and a political scandal involving Abe's cabinet. (See Akira Amari)
- Filmmaker and dolphin activist Ric O'Barry was refused entry to the country and was held prior to deportation.

=== February ===
- February 17 - launch of Hitomi (satellite), ChubuSat-2, ChubuSat-3 and Horyu-4 using a H-IIA 202 space launch vehicle

=== March ===
- March 11 - Japan commemorates the fifth anniversary of the 2011 Tohoku earthquake and tsunami and the subsequent of Fukushima nuclear disaster.
- March 25 - Kyoto Tamba Kogen Quasi-National Park is established
- March 25 - Asagishi, Hanasaki (Hokkaido), Higashi-Oiwake, Kami-Shirataki, Kanehana, Kyū-Shirataki, Ōshida, Shimo-Shirataki, Tomisato and Washinosu stations are closed
- March 26 - Higashi-Himeji, Nishi-kumamoto, Ishinomakiayumino, Odasakae and Maya stations opens
- March 26 - Hokkaido Shinkansen starts its service from Shin-Aomori Station to Shin-Hakodate-Hokuto Station
- March 26 - Museum of Natural and Environmental History, Shizuoka opens
- March 27 – Kumamoto gubernatorial election: Incumbent Ikuo Kabashima reelected for a third term
- March 27 - Democratic Party (Japan) is established

=== April ===
- April 2 - Tsuyama Railroad Educational Museum opens
- April 16 – A 7.0 magnitude earthquake strikes Kumamoto prefecture, and kills at least 50 people and 3,129 injured.
- April 24 – National Diet, House of Representatives: By-elections in Hokkaido 5th district and in Kyoto 3rd district

=== May ===
- May 1–2 - G7 Kitakyushu Energy Ministerial Meeting
- May 23 - Akatsuki (spacecraft) begins a scientific mission at Venus after a troubled 5-years travel
- May 26–27 – The 42nd G7 summit was held on Kashiko Island

=== June ===
- IUPAC declared the element 113 Ununtrium as Nihonium, first element in the periodic table whose name is derived from Japan.
- June 5 – Okinawa assembly election: Governor Onaga's anti-base, left-wing supporters expand their majority

=== July ===
- July 10 – National Diet, House of Councillors: 24th regular election
- July 10 – Kagoshima gubernatorial election
- July 23 – Tatsuo Hirano, independent member of the House of Councillors from Iwate, joins the Liberal Democratic Party, giving the party the first majority of its own since the 1989 election defeat
- July 26 - A knife attack in Sagamihara kills 19 people and injures up to 50.
- July 31 – Tokyo gubernatorial, assembly by-elections

=== August ===
- Japan at the 2016 Summer Olympics
- August 21: Russell M. Nelson dedicates the Sapporo Japan Temple, the 151st LDS temple and third LDS temple in Japan.

=== September ===
- July to September - According to an official report by the Japan National Police Agency, 48 hospitalized patients died after disinfectant liquid, diamitol, was administered to patients at a hospital in Yokohama. On July 7, 2018, a nurse identified as the main suspect was detained and confessed.

=== October ===
- October 16 – Niigata gubernatorial election
- October 21 - A Richer Scale 6.2 earthquake, with aftershocks in Kurayoshi, Tottori Prefecture, according to Japan Fire and Disaster Management Agency official confirmed report, 30 persons were wounded.
- October 23 – Okayama gubernatorial election
- October 23 – Toyama gubernatorial election
- October 23 – National Diet, House of Representatives: By-elections in Fukuoka, 6th district and in Tokyo, 10th district
- October 25 - Two explosions in a park in the Japanese city of Utsunomiya, Tochigi Prefecture, kill at least one person and injure three others. Local media report that a 72-year-old ex-military officer is responsible for the blasts. A fire the same day destroyed the suspect's house. (The Guardian), (BBC)

=== November ===
- November 20 – Tochigi gubernatorial election

=== December ===
5th: Abe declares his historic plan to visit Pearl Harbor

- December 18 - A bottoming net fishing boat Daifuku Maru capsized off coast Matsue, Shimane Prefecture, according to Japan Coast Guard official confirmed report, nine people lost to lives.
- December 22 - A massive fire in Itoigawa, Niigata Prefecture, according to Japanese Fire and Disaster Management Agency confirmed report, 17 person wounded.

== The Nobel Prize ==
- Yoshinori Ohsumi: 2016 Nobel Prize in Physiology or Medicine winner.

== Culture ==
=== Arts and entertainment ===
- List of 2016 box office number-one films in Japan
- March 4 - 39th Japan Academy Prize
- March 12 - 10th Seiyu Awards

== Arts and entertainment ==
- 2016 in anime
- 2016 in Japanese music
- 2016 in Japanese television
- List of 2016 box office number-one films in Japan
- List of Japanese films of 2016

== Sports ==
- October 9 – 2016 Formula One World Championship is held at 2016 Japanese Grand Prix
- October 16 – 2016 MotoGP World Championship is held at 2016 Japanese motorcycle Grand Prix
- 2016 F4 Japanese Championship
- 2016 Japanese Formula 3 Championship
- 2016 Super Formula Championship
- 2016 Super GT Series
- 2016 FIFA Club World Cup (Japan)
- 2016 in Japanese football
- 2016 J1 League
- 2016 J2 League
- 2016 J3 League
- 2016 Japan Football League
- 2016 Japanese Regional Leagues
- 2016 Japanese Super Cup
- 2016 Emperor's Cup
- 2016 J.League Cup

== Deaths ==
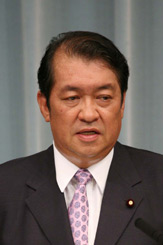
Kunio Hatoyama

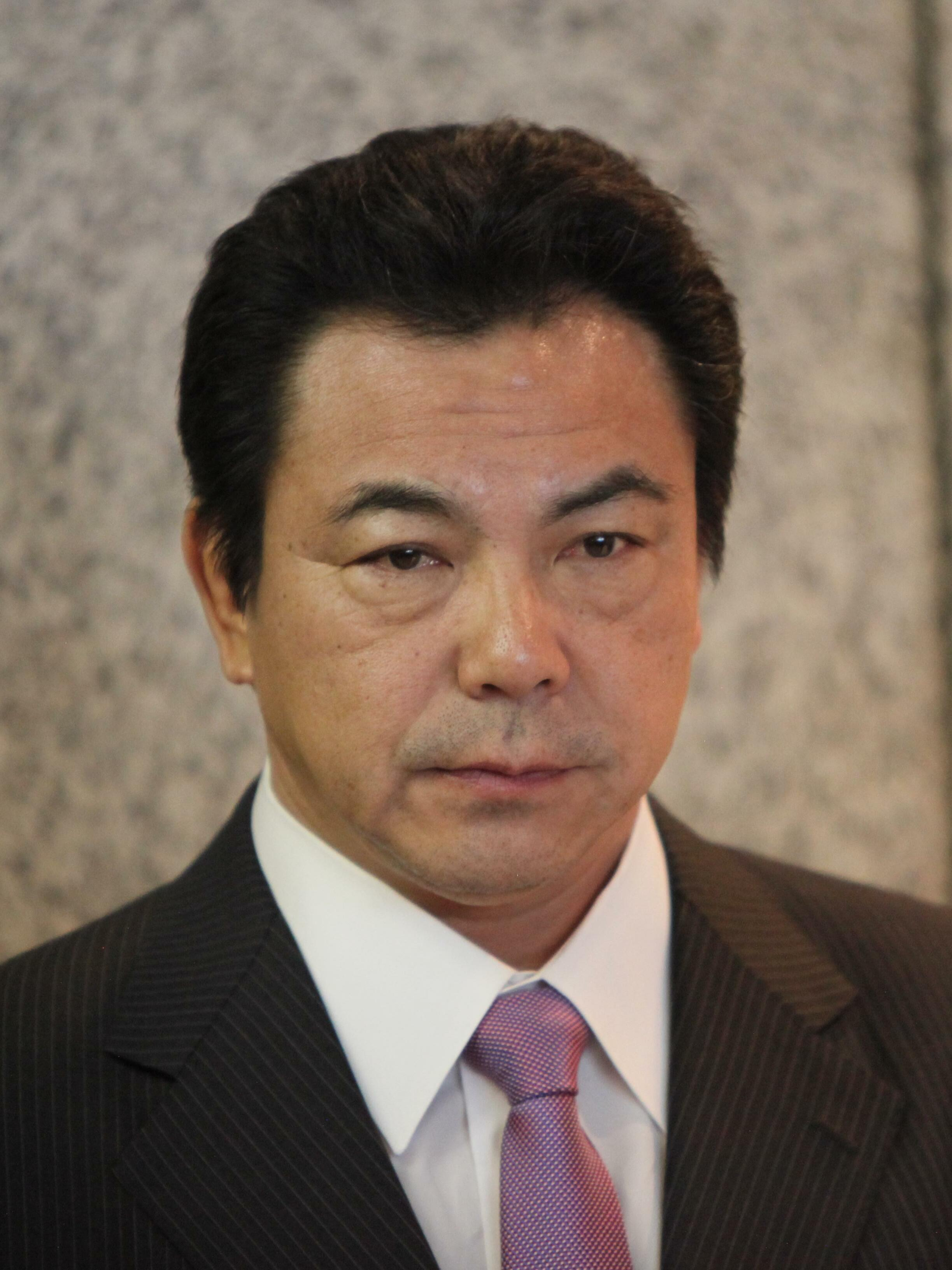
Chiyonofuji Mitsugu

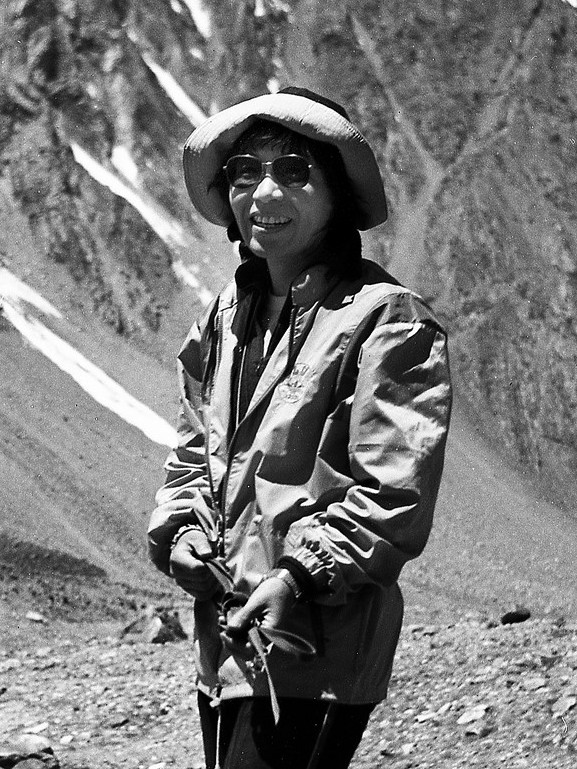
Junko Tabei

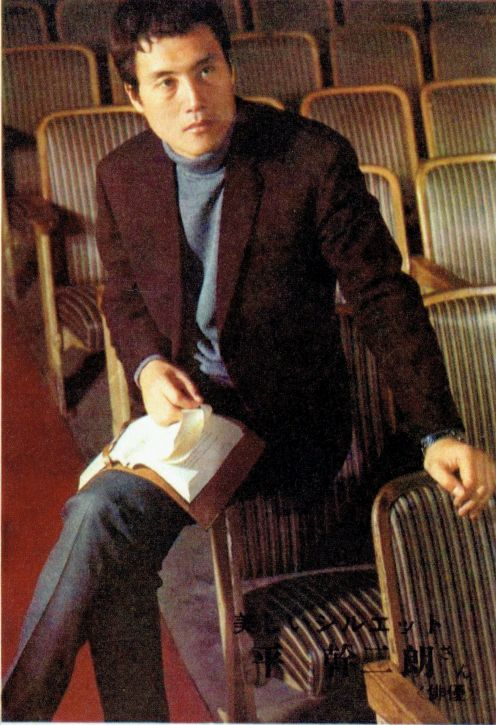
Mikijirō Hira

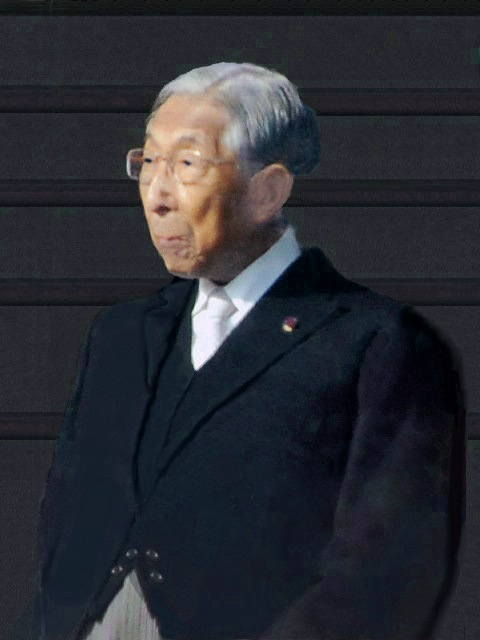
Takahito, Prince Mikasa

=== April ===
- April 3 – Kōji Wada, rock singer (b. 1974)

=== May ===
- May 5 – Isao Tomita, composer (b. 1932)
- May 17 – Yūko Mizutani, voice actress (b. 1964)

=== June ===
- June 21 – Kunio Hatoyama, politician (b. 1948)

=== July ===
- July 31 – Chiyonofuji Mitsugu, sumo wrestler (b. 1955)

=== October ===
- October 20 – Junko Tabei, mountaineer (b. 1939)
- October 23 – Mikijirō Hira, actor (b. 1933)
- October 27 – Takahito, Prince Mikasa, brother of Emperor Shōwa (b. 1915)

=== November ===
- November 3 – Jiang Ge, murder victim (b. 1992)
- November 29 – Hiroshi Ogawa, announcer (b. 1926)

=== December ===
- December 29 – Jinpachi Nezu, actor (b. 1947)

== See also ==
- 2016 in anime
- 2016 in Japanese music
- 2016 in Japanese television
- List of Japanese films of 2016
