= 2015 in Japan =

- Decades: 1990s; 2000s; 2010s; 2020s; 2030s
- See also: Other events of 2015; History of Japan • Timeline • Years

The following lists events that happened during 2015 in Japan.

- Year: Heisei 27
- Imperial year: 2675

== Incumbents ==
- Emperor: Akihito
- Prime Minister: Shinzō Abe (L–Yamaguchi)
- Chief Cabinet Secretary: Yoshihide Suga (L–Kanagawa)
- Chief Justice of the Supreme Court: Itsurō Terada
- President of the House of Representatives: Nobutaka Machimura until April 20, Tadamori Oshima from April 21
- President of the House of Councillors: Masaaki Yamazaki
- Diet sessions: 189th (regular, January 26 to June 24)

=== Governors ===
- Aichi Prefecture: Hideaki Omura
- Akita Prefecture: Norihisa Satake
- Aomori Prefecture: Shingo Mimura
- Chiba Prefecture: Kensaku Morita
- Ehime Prefecture: Tokihiro Nakamura
- Fukui Prefecture: Issei Nishikawa
- Fukuoka Prefecture: Hiroshi Ogawa
- Fukushima Prefecture: Masao Uchibori
- Gifu Prefecture: Hajime Furuta
- Gunma Prefecture: Masaaki Osawa
- Hiroshima Prefecture: Hidehiko Yuzaki
- Hokkaido: Harumi Takahashi
- Hyogo Prefecture: Toshizō Ido
- Ibaraki Prefecture: Masaru Hashimoto
- Ishikawa Prefecture: Masanori Tanimoto
- Iwate Prefecture: Takuya Tasso
- Kagawa Prefecture: Keizō Hamada
- Kagoshima Prefecture: Satoshi Mitazono
- Kanagawa Prefecture: Yuji Kuroiwa
- Kochi Prefecture: Masanao Ozaki
- Kumamoto Prefecture: Ikuo Kabashima
- Kyoto Prefecture: Keiji Yamada
- Mie Prefecture: Eikei Suzuki
- Miyagi Prefecture: Yoshihiro Murai
- Miyazaki Prefecture: Shunji Kōno
- Nagano Prefecture: Shuichi Abe
- Nagasaki Prefecture: Hōdō Nakamura
- Nara Prefecture: Shōgo Arai
- Niigata Prefecture: Hirohiko Izumida
- Oita Prefecture: Katsusada Hirose
- Okayama Prefecture: Ryuta Ibaragi
- Okinawa Prefecture: Takeshi Onaga
- Osaka Prefecture: Ichirō Matsui
- Saga Prefecture: Hiroki Sakai (until 14 January); Yoshinori Yamaguchi (starting 14 January)
- Saitama Prefecture: Kiyoshi Ueda
- Shiga Prefecture: Taizō Mikazuki
- Shiname Prefecture: Zenbe Mizoguchi
- Shizuoka Prefecture: Heita Kawakatsu
- Tochigi Prefecture: Tomikazu Fukuda
- Tokushima Prefecture: Kamon Iizumi
- Tokyo: Yōichi Masuzoe
- Tottori Prefecture: Shinji Hirai
- Toyama Prefecture: Takakazu Ishii
- Wakayama Prefecture: Yoshinobu Nisaka
- Yamagata Prefecture: Mieko Yoshimura
- Yamaguchi Prefecture: Tsugumasa Muraoka
- Yamanashi Prefecture: Hitoshi Gotō

== Events ==
=== January ===
- January 8 – The United States National Highway Traffic Safety Administration fines Honda a record 70 million dollars for grossly under-reporting fatal accidents and injuries to the government.
- January 14 – The cabinet of Prime Minister of Japan Shinzo Abe approves a record defence budget with plans to buy surveillance aircraft and Lockheed Martin F-35 Lightning II fighter jets to improve the security of uninhabited islands in the East China Sea claimed by both Japan and China.
- January 15 – The Japan–Australia Economic Partnership Agreement enters into force.
- January 18
  - Prime Minister Shinzo Abe meets the King of Jordan Abdullah II, and commits to 14.7 billion yen of assistance consisting of 12 billion in yen loans and 2.7 billion in contributions to international organizations providing medical assistance and supplies to refugee camps.
  - The Democratic Party of Japan elects Katsuya Okada as the party's leader.
- January 20 – ISIL threatens to kill two Japanese citizens unless it receives a ransom of $200 million.
- January 24 – Japanese government states that it is seeking to verify a video that claims the killing of Japanese hostage Haruna Yukawa by ISIL militants.
- January 28 – Skymark Airlines files for bankruptcy with the Tokyo District Court, having liabilities of 71.09 billion yen ($603.6 million)
- January 31 – A monitoring group claims that ISIL has reportedly released a video showing the execution of Japanese hostage Kenji Goto.

=== February ===
- February 1 – JAXA and Mitsubishi Heavy Industries conduct its first launch of an Information Gathering Satellite with the aid of an H-IIA rocket F-27 from Tanegashima Space Center.
- February 17 – The Supreme Court finalizes the death sentence for Tomohiro Kato, the man convicted of killing seven people and wounding 10 others in an indiscriminate rampage in Akihabara, Tokyo on June 8, 2008.
- February 20 – The Tokyo Metropolitan Police Department Public Security Bureau arrests Tsutomu Shirosaki, a Japanese Red Army member, for attempted arson associated with a 1986 mortar attack in Indonesia as he arrives at Narita Airport, having been deported from the United States following his January 16 release from jail.
- February 23 – Agricultural Minister Koya Nishikawa resigns over a fundraising scandal and is succeeded by Yoshimasa Hayashi, whom Nishikawa had replaced as agriculture minister in September 2014.
- February 26
  - The Supreme Court endorses punishment issued by Kaiyukan, an aquarium in Osaka, including suspensions, against two male managers for sexual harassment, overturning the ruling by Osaka High Court that said the penalties were too heavy, making this the first decision over such issues by the Japanese Supreme Court.
  - Prince William makes his first visit to Japan, visiting Fukushima Prefecture and Miyagi Prefecture, the areas affected by 2011 Tōhoku earthquake and tsunami.

=== March ===
- March 2 – Rugby World Cup Ltd. and the 2019 Rugby World Cup organizing committee announce 12 venues, including a new stadium to be built in Kamaishi, Iwate, a city affected by 2011 Tōhoku earthquake and tsunami, to host the 2019 Rugby World Cup matches.
- March 3 – Paul Allen, a co-founder of Microsoft and a philanthropist, announces that he has discovered the Japanese battleship Musashi, more than 70 years after it was sunk by the United States Navy, in the Sibuyan Sea, of the Philippines.
- March 10
  - The Supreme Court rejects prosecutors' claims that a 41-year-old man from Osaka Prefecture evaded 570 million yen in taxes by failing to declare income from betting on horse races, confirming that money lost betting on horses can, for tax purposes, be considered expenses deductible from winnings.
  - FamilyMart and UNY Group Holdings, the holding company of Circle K Sunkus, reach an agreement to merge in September 2016, forming the second biggest convenience store operator by sales in Japan under a single brand name.
  - Yukio Hatoyama, a former Prime Minister and a former leader of the DPJ, despite requests from the Japanese government not to do so, makes a personal visit to Crimea, entering the territory with a Russian visa, which is against the policy of Japanese government following the annexation of Crimea by the Russian Federation. Georgy Muradov, deputy prime minister of the Republic of Crimea, met Hatoyama at Simferopol International Airport.
- March 12 – A 46-year-old man, arrested in Hawaii in 2014 for a murder case which occurred in 2007, admits after entering a guilty plea at a court in San Diego that he killed his Japanese wife and left her body in the Anza-Borrego Desert in California.
- March 14–18 – Sendai hosts the third World Conference on Disaster Risk Reduction, resulting in the Sendai Framework, an agreement aiming for "the substantial reduction of disaster risk and losses in lives, livelihoods and health and in the economic, physical, social, cultural and environmental assets of persons, businesses, communities and countries."
- March 14 – Hokuriku Shinkansen starts its service between Nagano and Kanazawa in Ishikawa Prefecture, cutting travel time between Tokyo and Kanazawa by about eighty minutes to as little as two hours and twenty-eight minutes.
- March 18 – Three Japanese were killed and another three were injured in Bardo National Museum attack occurred in Tunis, Tunisia
- March 24 – Two Japanese nationals were killed in the crash of Germanwings Flight 9525.
- March 27 – The main keep of Himeji Castle, a UNESCO-designated World Heritage Site, has reopened to the public after a major five-year face-lift. The keep itself is recognized as one of the National Treasures of Japan.

=== April ===
- April 8 – Narita Airport opens the new Terminal 3, designated for Low-cost carriers.
- April 8–9 – Emperor Akihito and Empress Michiko make their first visit to Palau, attending a reception hosted by Tommy Remengesau, the President of Palau; also present are the Micronesian President Manny Mori and the Marshall Islands President Christopher Loeak. On the following day, the Emperor and the Empress visit the island of Peleliu, where some 10,000 soldiers of the Japanese Imperial Army were killed in the Battle of Peleliu in 1944.
- April 10 – The Nikkei 225 index reaches 20,006.00 in the first few minutes of trade, passing the 20,000 level for the first time since April 2000.
- April 12 – In the first round of the 2015 Japanese unified local elections, all 10 incumbent governors and 4 incumbent mayors of designated cities campaigning to keep their positions have been re-elected.
- April 14
  - The South Korean government lifts the departure ban on a former chief of the Sankei Shimbun's Seoul bureau, who had been barred from leaving the country for eight months following his indictment in October 2014 for defamation of South Korean President Park Geun-hye. The charges were due to an article, posted on a Sankei website, that referred to a rumor in a South Korean publication that Park was seeing a man on the day of the Sewol ferry disaster in April 2014.
  - The Fukui Prefecture District Court bans Kansai Electric Power from restarting the nos. 3 and 4 reactors of Takahama Nuclear Power Plant.
  - Asiana Airlines Flight 162, an Airbus A320 aircraft, skids off the runway of Hiroshima Airport, resulting in 27 injures.
- April 17 – Prime Minister Shinzo Abe meets Takeshi Onaga, Governor of Okinawa Prefecture for the first time to push ahead with the government plan to relocate a U.S. military base in Futenma to the proposed location around Camp Schwab in Nago, Okinawa, but failed to reach agreement over the relocation.

April 21 At Yamanashi Test Track, a seven car maglev train set a new land speed record for rail vehicles at 603 km/h. It is the only rail vehicle ever surpassed 600 km/h speed mark

- April 22
  - Kagoshima District Court has rejected an attempt by local residents to halt the restart of two nuclear reactors at Sendai Nuclear Power Plant in Satsumasendai, Kagoshima, which was approved by the Nuclear Regulation Authority in September 2014.
  - A drone which has trace levels of radioactive cesium is discovered on the roof of the Prime Minister's Official Residence, while Prime Minister Abe has been in Jakarta to attend the 60th anniversary of the Bandung Conference of 1955. Two days later, a 40-year-old man turns himself in to Fukui prefectural police, claiming that he landed the drone in protest against the Japanese government's nuclear energy policy.

=== May ===
- May 17 – A dormitory apartment fire in Kawasaki, Kanagawa Prefecture, according to Fire and Disaster Management Agency official confirmed report, 11 peoples lost to lives, with 17 are injures.
- May 29 – Kuchinoerabu-jima erupts, with pyroclastic flows reaching the coast.
- May 30 – An abnormally intense magnitude 7.8 earthquake occurs in the Bonin Islands, with shaking observed throughout the territory. Official reports confirm 13 injuries.

=== June ===
- June 30 – A passenger commits suicide by setting himself on fire while riding the Tokaido Shinkansen to Odawara, Kanagawa, resulting in two fatalities.ja:東海道新幹線火災事件

=== July ===
- July 26 – A Piper PA-46 crashes into a residential area in Chofu, Tokyo, starting a fire that ends with three deaths.

=== August ===
- August 11 – The Sendai Nuclear Power Plant No. 1 reactor is the first reactor to be restarted in accordance with the new regulatory requirements established by the Nuclear Regulation Authority following the Fukushima Daiichi Nuclear Power Plant accident

=== September ===
- September 11 – A heavy torrential rain along the entire length of the Kinu River leads to a levee collapse and flash flooding in Jōsō, Ibaraki. Official reports confirm 8 fatalities.

=== October ===
- October 1 – Osaka Innovation Party, as predecessor of Nippon Ishin no Kai (Japan Innovation Party) was founded by Tōru Hashimoto and Ichirō Matsui.

== The Nobel Prize ==
- Satoshi Omura: 2015 Nobel Prize in Physiology or Medicine winner.
- Takaaki Kajita: 2015 Nobel Prize in Physics winner.

== Culture ==
=== Arts and entertainment ===
- Events in anime: 2015 in anime.
- Japanese films released this year: List of Japanese films of 2015.
- Events in Japanese literature: 2015 in Japanese literature.
- Events in manga: 2015 in manga.
- Events in Japanese television: 2015 in Japanese television.

== Sports ==
- January 23
  - Yokozuna Grand Champion Hakuhō Shō wins his 33rd career championship with two days to spare at the New Year Grand Sumo Tournament in Ryogoku Kokugikan, surpassing the record of 32 titles he shared with sumo legend Taiho Koki, who made the long-lasting record in 1971.
  - The Japan national football team loses to the UAE in a penalty shootout after a 1–1 draw at a quarterfinal match of the 2015 AFC Asian Cup, marking their earliest exit in 19 years since losing to Kuwait 0–2 at the 1996 Cup quarterfinals, back before the national team had ever made it to the FIFA World Cup.
- February 3 – The Japan Football Association(JFA) fires Javier Aguirre as the manager of the Japan national football team, as Aguirre has been involved in an ongoing match-fixing investigation over the Real Zaragoza's 2–1 win against Levante UD on the final day of the 2010–11 La Liga, when Aguirre was the head coach of Zaragoza.
- February 21 – Takashi Uchiyama, the super featherweight boxing champion of the World Boxing Association, is promoted to the status of super champion.
- March 12 – The JFA announces that Vahid Halilhodžić has been named as the new manager of the Japan national football team.
- March 13 – Yu Darvish, a pitcher of Major League Baseball club Texas Rangers, announces his decision to undergo Tommy John surgery on his right elbow, which likely will sideline Darvish until early 2016.
- March 14–22 – The 2015 World Women's Curling Championship is held at Tsukisamu Gymnasium in Sapporo
- March 15 – Yusuke Suzuki sets the new 20 km race walk world record of 1:16:36 at the Asian Race Walking Championships, breaking the former record set by Yohann Diniz by 26 seconds.
- March 28 – Yoshihide Kiryu runs the men's 100 meters in 9.87 seconds to win the men's invitational sprint at the Texas Relays, marking the fastest ever electronically recorded performance by an Asian sprinter under any conditions.
- April 4 – Mieko Nagaoka becomes the first 100-year-old in the world to complete a 1,500-meter freestyle swim in a time of just over 1 hour and 15 minutes, using the backstroke for the entire duration in a 25-meter pool.
- September 27 – 2015 Formula One World Championship is held at 2015 Japanese Grand Prix
- October 11 – 2015 MotoGP World Championship is held at 2015 Japanese motorcycle Grand Prix
- 2015 F4 Japanese Championship
- 2015 Japanese Formula 3 Championship
- 2015 Super Formula Championship * 2015 Super GT Series
- 2015 FIFA Club World Cup (Japan)
- 2015 in Japanese football
- 2015 J1 League
- 2015 J2 League
- 2015 J3 League
- 2015 Japan Football League
- 2015 Japanese Regional Leagues
- 2015 Japanese Super Cup
- 2015 Emperor's Cup
- 2015 J.League Cup

== Deaths ==
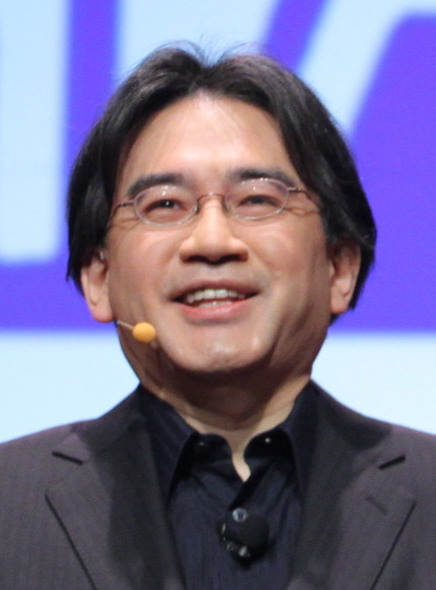
Satoru Iwata, a Japanese businessman, video game programmer and designer, and the 4th President of Nintendo, who died of bile duct cancer at the age of 55.

In the Heisei Memoriam of 2015 despite Japanese demographic and aging crisis in the country, among top 12 famous Japanese people who died peacefully due to illness and old age, including Hitoshi Saito, Kinya Aikawa, Masayuki Imai, Nobutaka Machimura, Takanonami Sadahiro, Yoichiro Nambu, Satoru Iwata, Nana Kuroki, Naomi Kawashima, Yoshihiko Funazaki, Kai Atō, and Shigeru Mizuki.

=== January ===
- January 12
  - Keiko Hanagata, voice actress (b. 1935)
  - Akira Kinoshita, photographer (b. 1936)
- January 15 – Chikao Ōtsuka, actor and voice actor (b. 1929)
- January 17 – Kazumasa Hirai, novelist (b. 1938)
- January 18 – Yasuaki Taiho, baseball player (b. 1963)
- January 20 – Hitoshi Saito, judoka (b. 1961)
- January 29
  - Kōno Taeko, writer and critic (b. 1926)
  - Riichiro Manabe, composer (b. 1924)
  - Tenkoko Sonoda, politician (b. 1919)

=== February ===
- February 8 – Kenji Ekuan, industrial designer (b. 1929)
- February 12 – Tomie Ohtake, artist (naturalized to Brazil) (b. 1913)
- February 14 – Sheena, musician (b. 1953)
- February 19 – Yutaka Katayama, businessman (b. 1909)
- February 21 – Bandō Mitsugorō X, kabuki actor (b. 1956)
- February 28 – Shigeo Takii, justice of the Supreme Court of Japan (b. 1936)

=== March ===
- March 3 – Sangojugo, member of Tokyo Shock Boys (b. 1962)
- March 7
  - Shinji Ogawa, actor and voice actor (b. 1941)
  - Yoshihiro Tatsumi, manga artist (b. 1935)
- March 16 – Kuniyoshi Kaneko, painter, illustrator and photographer (b. 1936)
- March 19 – Katsura Beicho III, rakugoka (b. 1925)
- March 31 – Cocoa Fujiwara, manga artist and illustrator (b. 1983)

=== April ===
- April 1 – Misao Okawa, a supercentenarian, the verified oldest Japanese person ever, the oldest person ever born in Asia, and the fifth oldest verified person ever recorded (b. 1898)
- April 15 – Kinya Aikawa, actor, TV presenter, and voice actor (b. 1934)

=== May ===
- May 28 – Masayuki Imai, playwright and actor (b. 1961)
- May 29 – Naomi Miyake, cognitive scientist (b. 1948)

=== June ===
- June 1 – Nobutaka Machimura, politician and the former Speaker of the House of Representatives. (b. 1944)
- June 18 – Kazuya Tatekabe, voice actor (b. 1934)
- June 20 – Takanonami Sadahiro, sumo wrestler and coach (b. 1971)

=== July ===
- July 5 – Yoichiro Nambu, Nobel Prize-winning Japanese-American physicist (b. 1921)
- July 11 – Satoru Iwata, businessman, video game programmer and designer, and the 4th President of Nintendo (b. 1959)

=== September ===
- September 5 – Setsuko Hara, actress (b. 1920)
- September 19 – Nana Kuroki, freelancer announcer and journalist (b. 1982)
- September 24 – Naomi Kawashima, actress (b. 1960)

=== October ===
- October 15 – Yoshihiko Funazaki, novelist, poet, illustrator, manga artist, songwriter, and assistant professor of Shirayuri College (b. 1925)
- October 27 – Miyu Matsuki, voice actress

=== November ===
- 15 November – Kai Atō, actor and TV presenter (b. 1946)
- 30 November – Shigeru Mizuki, manga artist and historian (b. 1922)

== See also ==
- 2015 in Japanese music
- 2015 in Japanese television
- List of Japanese films of 2015
