= Kishimoto =

Kishimoto (written: 岸本) is a Japanese family name. Notable people with this family name include:

- Cecil Kishimoto (born 1990), Japanese model
- Christina Kishimoto, American school administrator
- Hayami Kishimoto (born 1987), Japanese singer
- Junki Kishimoto (born 1996), Japanese baseball player
- Kayoko Kishimoto (born 1960), Japanese actress
- Kazumi Kishimoto (born 1986), Japanese competitive figure skater
- Masao Kishimoto (1881–1963), Director of the Karafuto Agency
- Masashi Kishimoto (born 1974), Japanese manga artist and creator of Naruto. Also the older twin brother of Seishi Kishimoto
- Sachiko Kishimoto (岸本 幸子; born 1936), Japanese long jumper
- Saizo Kishimoto (1928–2014), Japanese gangster
- Seishi Kishimoto (born 1974), Japanese manga artist and creator of 666 Satan. Also the younger twin brother of Masashi Kishimoto
- Shūhei Kishimoto (1956–2025), Japanese politician
- Tadamitsu Kishimoto (born 1939), Japanese immunologist
- Takayuki Kishimoto (born 1990), Japanese hurdler
- Takehiro Kishimoto (岸本 岳大; born 1980), Japanese chef
- Taku Kishimoto (岸本卓), Japanese screenwriter
- Toshiko D'Elia (née Kishimoto) (1930–2014), American Masters athletics long distance runner
- Yoshihisa Kishimoto (born 1961), Japanese video game designer and creator of the Kunio-kun and Double Dragon franchises

== Fictional characters ==
- Kaoru Kishimoto, a character in Hikaru no Go media
- Kei Kishimoto, a character in Gantz media
