= Nagaoka =

Nagaoka (jap. 長岡, 永岡 lit. "length, hill", "eternity, hill") may refer to:

== Places ==
- Nagaoka, Niigata, Japan
- Nagaoka-kyō, the capital of Japan from 784 to 794
  - Nagaokakyō, Kyoto, Japan, a city at the location of Nagaoka-kyō
- Izunagaoka, Shizuoka, Japan, a former town in Izu Peninsula

== People with the surname ==
- Chisato Nagaoka (長岡 千里, born 1976), Japanese bobsledder
- Go Nagaoka (長岡 郷, born 1984), Japanese footballer
- Hantaro Nagaoka (長岡 半太郎, 1865–1950), Japanese physicist responsible for the 1904 "Saturnian" model of atomic structure
- Harukazu Nagaoka (長岡 春一, 1877–1949), Japanese diplomat and jurist
- Hideki Nagaoka (長岡 秀樹, born 2001), Japanese baseball player
- Keiko Nagaoka (永岡 桂子, born 1953)), Japanese politician
- Masaru Nagaoka (長岡 勝, born 1962), Japanese ski jumper
- Moeko Nagaoka (長岡 萌映子, born 1993), Japanese women's basketball player
- Mieko Nagaoka (長岡 三重子, 1914–2021)), Japanese Masters athlete
- Miyu Nagaoka (長岡 望悠, born 1991), Japanese volleyball player
- Nagako Nagaoka (長岡 良子), Japanese religious leader
- Ryosuke Nagaoka (長岡 亮介, born 1978), Japanese musician and singer
- Shusei Nagaoka (長岡 秀星, born 1936), Japanese illustrator
- Yayoi Nagaoka (長岡 弥生, born 1974), Japanese speed skater
- Yuna Nagaoka (長岡 柚奈, born 2005), Japanese pair skater
- Yūya Nagaoka (長岡 裕也, born 1985), Japanese shogi player
- Keiko Nagaoka (永岡 桂子, born 1953), Japanese politician
- Shuichi Nagaoka (永岡 秀一, born 1876), Japanese judoka

== Other uses ==
- Nagaoka (crater), a lunar crater named after Hantaro Nagaoka
