= Takehiro =

- Gender: Male

Origin
- Origin: Japanese
- Meaning: Different meanings depending on the kanji used

Takehiro (written: 丈裕, 丈博, 威宏, 武大, 武弘, 武洋, 豪宏, 豪大, 健弘, 剛裕, 剛大, 剛弘 or 岳大) is a masculine Japanese given name. Notable people with the name include:

- Takehiro Donoue (堂上 剛裕; born 1985), Japanese baseball player
- Takehiro Hayashi (林 威宏; born 1976), Japanese footballer
- Takehiro Hira (平 岳大; born 1974), Japanese actor
- Takehiro Honda (born 1945), Japanese jazz pianist
- Takehiro Irokawa (色川 武大; 1929–1989), Japanese writer
- Takehiro Ishii (石井 丈裕; born 1964), Japanese baseball player
- Takehiro Kashima (鹿島 丈博; born 1980), Japanese gymnast
- Takehiro Kato (加藤 豪宏; born 1974), Japanese footballer
- Takehiro Kodera (小寺 武大; born 1978), Japanese speed skater
- Takehiro Koyama, Japanese voice actor
- Takehiro Kishimoto (岸本 岳大; born 1980), Japanese chef
- Takehiro Mamiya (born 1989), Japanese music producer, better known as Yuyoyuppe
- Takehiro Murozono (室園 丈裕; born 1969), Japanese voice actor
- Takehiro Ōhira (大平 武洋; born 1977), Japanese shogi player
- Takehiro Otani (大谷 武大; born 1980), Japanese footballer
- Takehiro Sakamoto (坂本 豪大; born 1976), Japanese freestyle skier
- Takehiro Sonohara (園原 健弘; born 1962), Japanese racewalker
- Takehiro Tomiyasu (冨安 健洋; born 1998), Japanese footballer
- Takehiro Watanabe (skier) (渡部 剛弘; born 1993), Japanese Nordic combined skier
- Takehiro Watanabe (table tennis) (渡辺 武弘; born 1961), Japanese table tennis player
- Takehiro Yamamoto (山本 剛大; born 1993), Japanese motorcycle racer

== See also ==
- 8737 Takehiro, a main-belt minor planet
