= Hanasaki Station =

Hanasaki Station is the name of two train stations in Japan:

- Hanasaki Station (Hokkaido) (花咲駅)
- Hanasaki Station (Saitama) (花崎駅)
