= Kami-Shirataki Station =

Former railway station in Engaru, Hokkaido, Japan

Coordinates: 43.8765°N 143.1444°E

Kami-Shirataki Station 上白滝駅
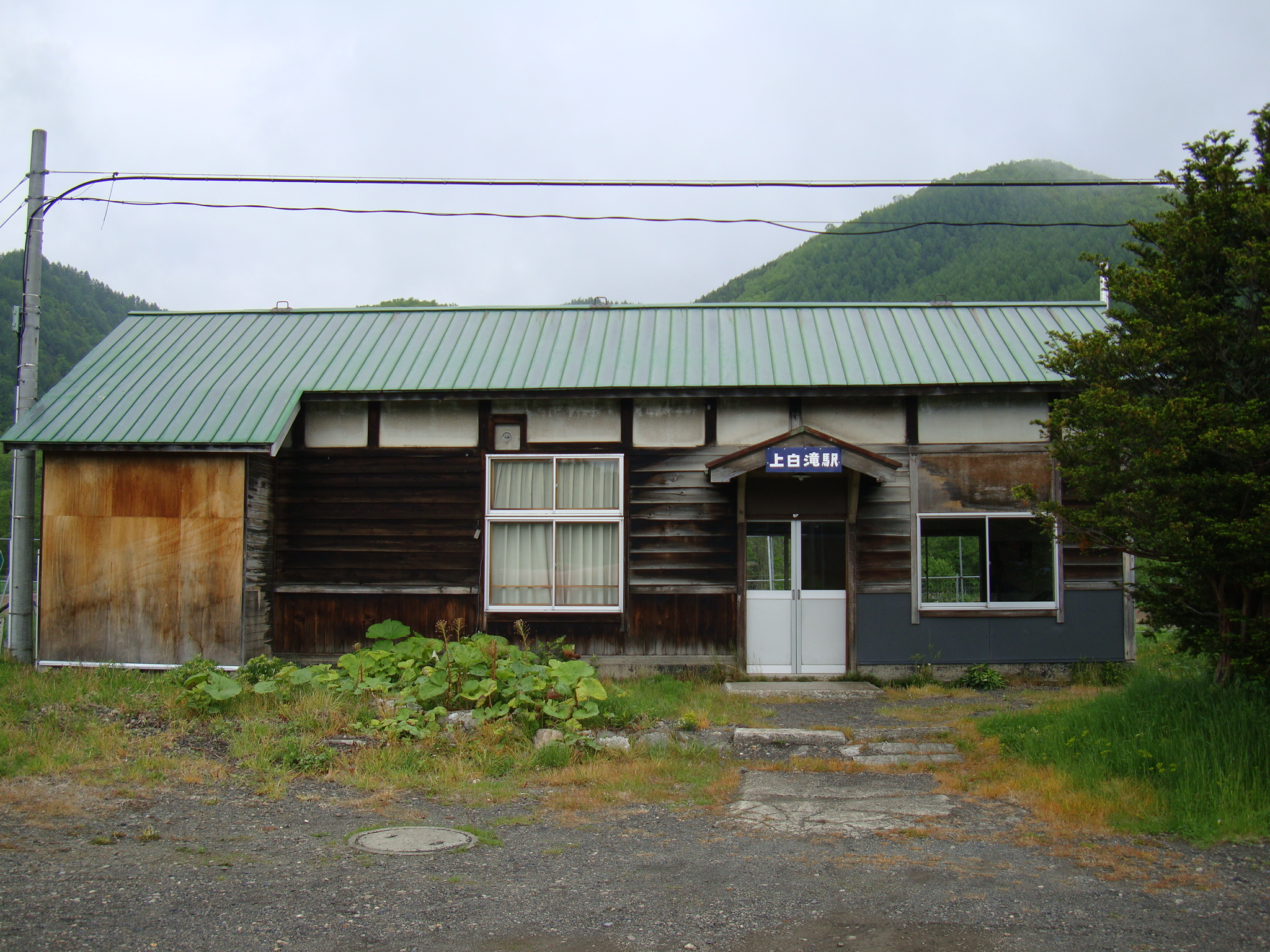
- Kami-Shirataki Station building in June 2009

General information
- Location: Kamishirataki, Engaru-cho, Monbetsu-gun, Hokkaido 099–0127; Japan
- Operator: Hokkaido Railway Company
- Line: ■ Sekihoku Main Line
- Distance: 78.9 km (49.0 mi) from Shin-Asahikawa
- Platforms: 1 side platform
- Tracks: 1

Other information
- Status: Closed
- Station code: A44

History
- Opened: 1 October 1932
- Closed: 25 March 2016
Location
- Location within Japan

Kami-Shirataki Station (上白滝駅, Kami-Shirataki-eki; lit. "Upper Shirataki") was a railway station on the Sekihoku Main Line in Engaru, Hokkaido, Japan, operated by Hokkaido Railway Company (JR Hokkaido). Opened in October 1932, the station closed in March 2016.

== Lines ==
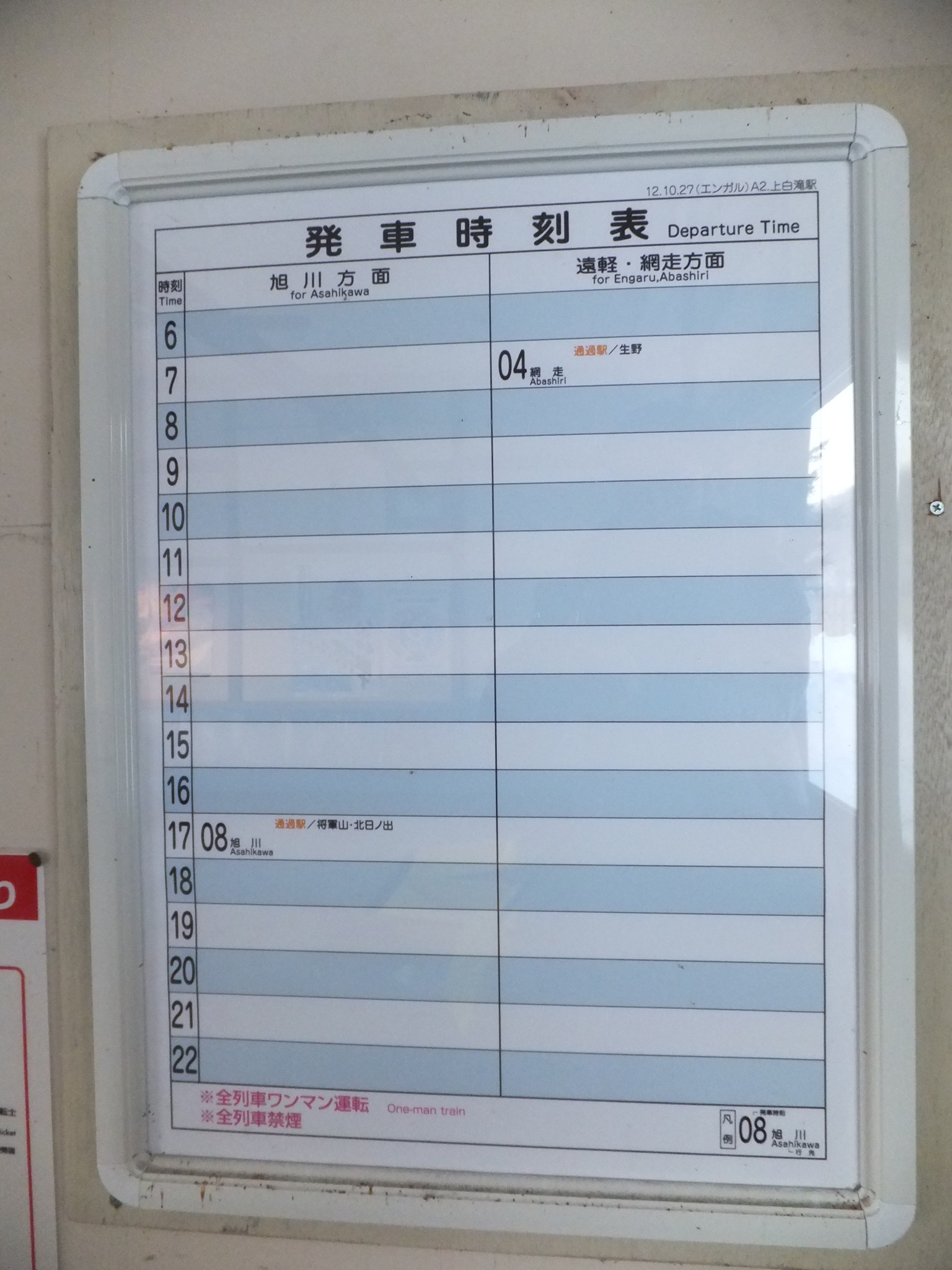
The timetable posted at the station in December 2012, showing only 2 trains stopping each day

Kami-Shirataki Station was served by the single-track Sekihoku Main Line, lying 78.9 km (49.0 mi) from the official starting point of the line at Shin-Asahikawa. The station was numbered "A44".

== Station layout ==
The station had a single side platform serving the single-track line. The station was unstaffed, but a station structure was provided, with toilet facilities for passengers.

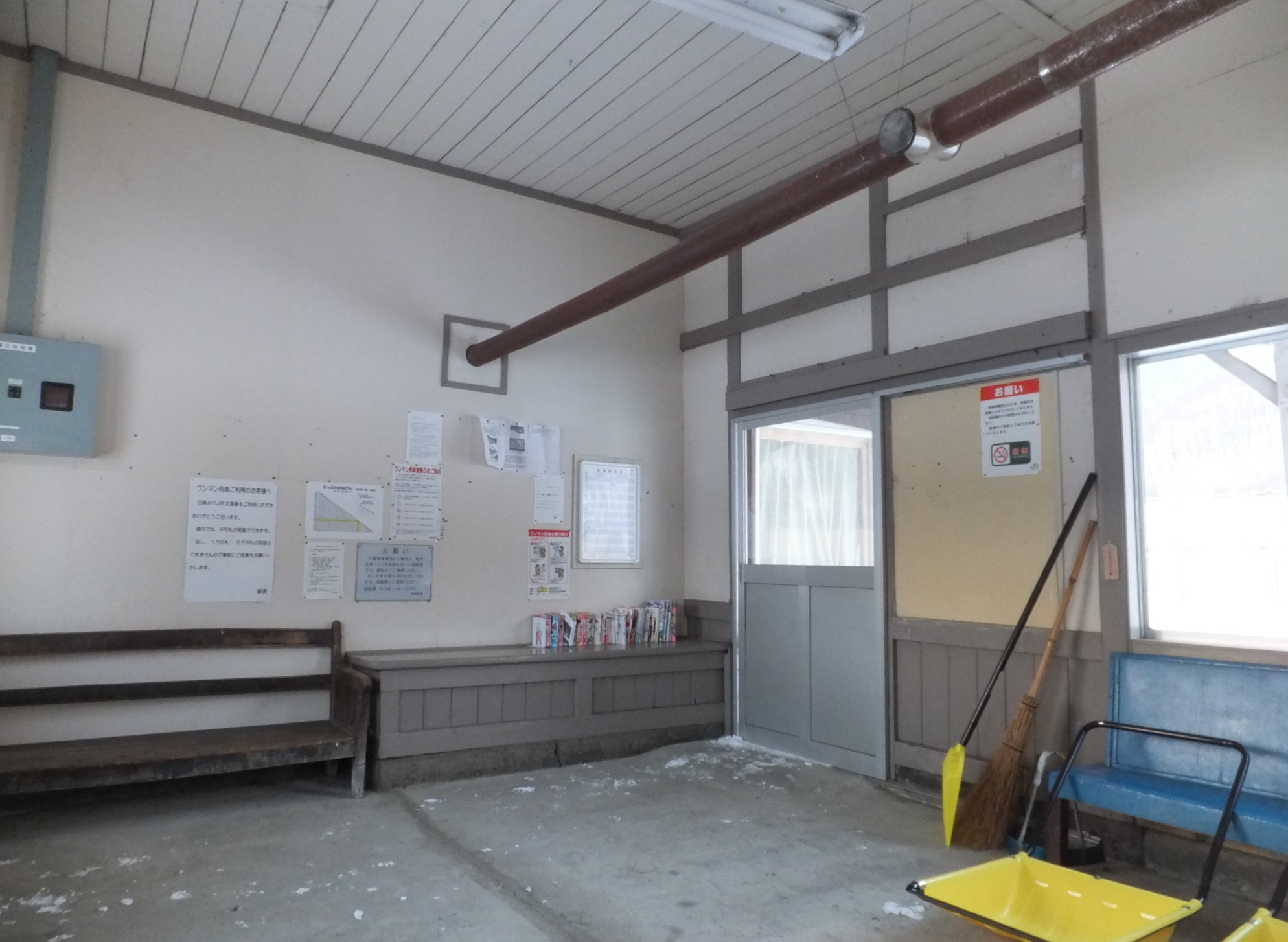
The station waiting room in December 2012

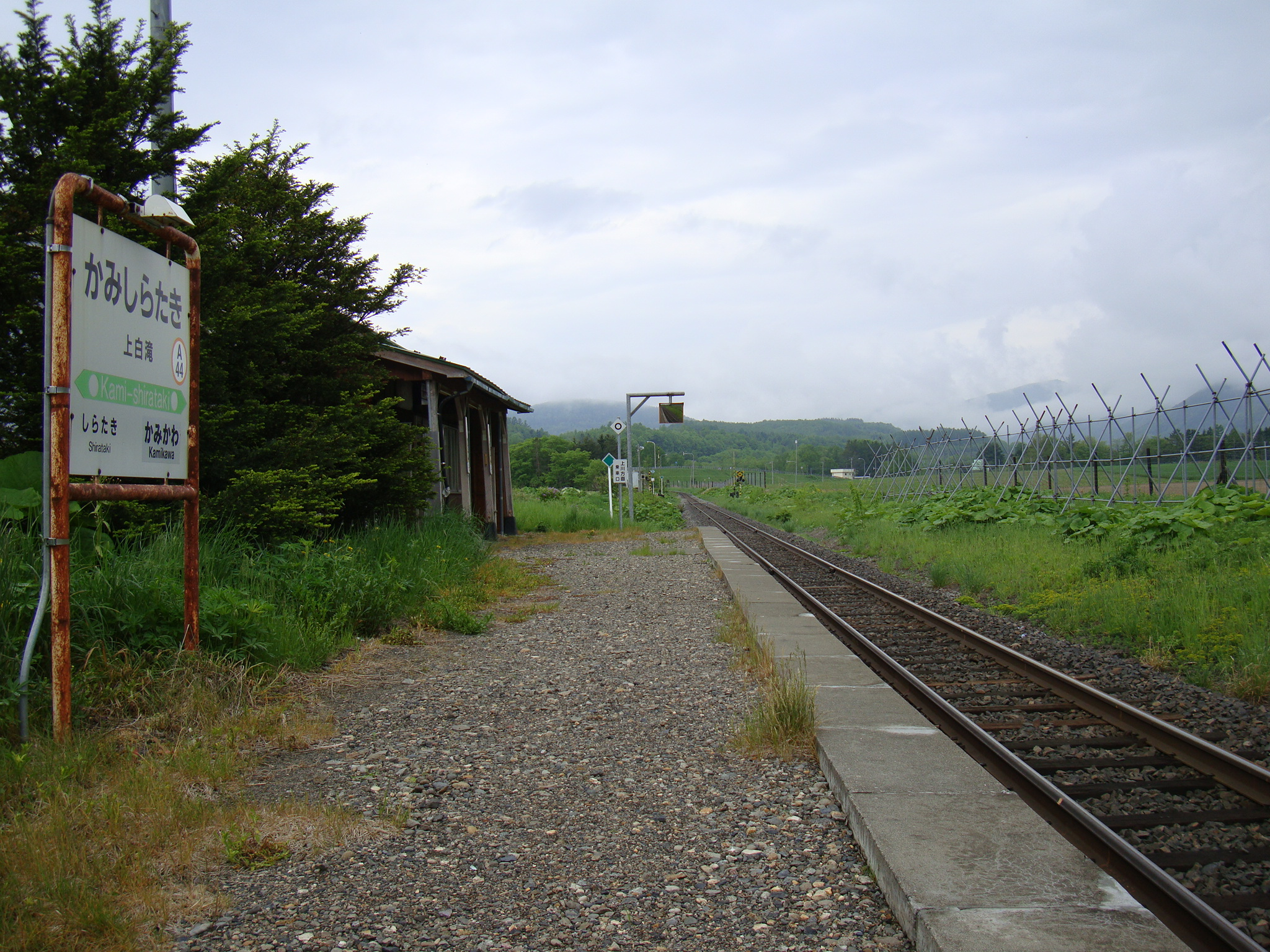
The station platform in June 2009

== Adjacent stations ==
«	Service	»
Sekihoku Main Line
Limited Express Okhotsk: Does not stop at this station
Limited Express Taisetsu: Does not stop at this station
Limited Rapid Kitami: Does not stop at this station
Kamikawa	Local	Shirataki

== History ==
The station opened on 1 October 1932. With the privatization of Japanese National Railways (JNR) on 1 April 1987, the station came under the control of JR Hokkaido.

In July 2015, JR Hokkaido announced that it would be closing the station along with three others on the line (Kyū-Shirataki Station, Shimo-Shirataki Station, and Kanehana Station) in March 2016, due to low passenger usage.

In January 2016, it was reported on Chinese state broadcaster CCTV's Facebook page that the station was being kept open for the benefit of just one high-school girl who used the station to commute to and from school, and that it was scheduled to close when the girl graduated. However, it was later revealed that the station in question was actually Kyū-Shirataki Station, two stops away, and there is no evidence that the timing of the closure of either station was connected with the girl's graduation.

The station closed following the last day of services on 25 March 2016.

== Surrounding area ==
- National Route 333

== See also ==
- List of railway stations in Japan
