= Kyū-Shirataki Station =

Former railway station in Engaru, Hokkaido, Japan

Coordinates: 43.9199°N 143.2367°E

Kyū-Shirataki Station 旧白滝駅
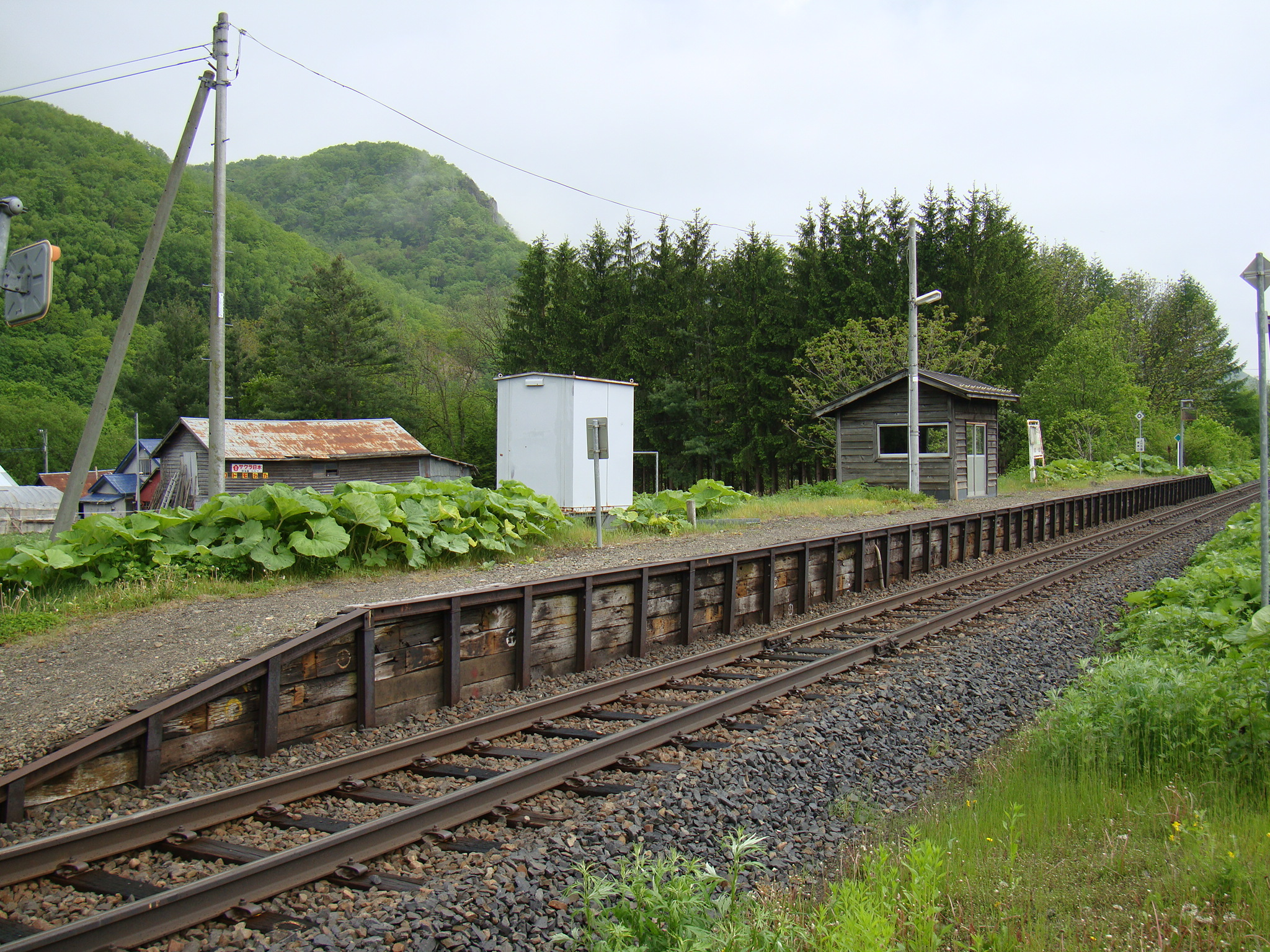
- The station platform in June 2009

General information
- Location: Kyūshirataki, Engaru-cho, Monbetsu-gun, Hokkaido 099–0102; Japan
- Operator: JR Hokkaido
- Line: ■ Sekihoku Main Line
- Distance: 88.3 km (54.9 mi) from Shin-Asahikawa
- Platforms: 1 side platform
- Tracks: 1

Other information
- Status: Closed
- Station code: A46

History
- Opened: 11 February 1947
- Closed: 25 March 2016
Location
- Location within Japan

Kyū-Shirataki Station (旧白滝駅, Kyū-Shirataki-eki; lit. "Old Shirataki Station") was a railway station on the Sekihoku Main Line in Engaru, Hokkaido, Japan, operated by Hokkaido Railway Company (JR Hokkaido). Opened in 1947, the station closed in March 2016.

== Lines ==
Kyū-Shirataki Station was served by the single-track Sekihoku Main Line, lying 88.3 km (54.9 mi) from the official starting point of the line at Shin-Asahikawa. The station was numbered "A46".

== Station layout ==
The station had a side platform serving the otherwise single-track line. The station was unstaffed, but had a station structure and waiting room.

== Adjacent stations ==
«	Service	»
Sekihoku Main Line
Limited Express Okhotsk: Does not stop at this station
Limited Express Taisetsu: Does not stop at this station
Limited Rapid Kitami: Does not stop at this station
Shirataki	Local	Shimo-Shirataki

== History ==
The station opened on 11 February 1947. With the privatization of Japanese National Railways (JNR) on 1 April 1987, the station came under the control of JR Hokkaido.

In July 2015, JR Hokkaido announced that it would be closing the station along with three others on the line (Shimo-Shirataki Station, Kami-Shirataki Station, and Kanehana Station) in March 2016, due to low passenger usage.

The station closed following the last day of services on 25 March 2016. The station structure and platform was demolished in October 2016.

=== In viral news ===
From January 2016, the station became the subject of global viral news, where it got known as being "the station that stays open for one high school girl".

The first known mention of the station was in an article published in The Asahi Shimbun on 7 January 2015 about Kana Harada, a 17-year-old student at the Hokkaido Engaru High School who took the train to school at Kyū-Shirataki Station, which had only one train stopping on the direction of the school, and three in the afternoon in the opposite direction. When she got on the train, there were already dozens of passengers, most of them being students at her school.

On 22 July, the Hokkaido Shimbun reported that JR Hokkaido would close the station when the timetables were revised in March of the following year. The article also includes comments from Harada, who said that she rarely ever sees other people use the station and that she heard the station would close after her graduation. On 1 March 2016, Harada took the train for the last time to attend her graduation ceremony.

The first known occurrence of the news outside of Japan was on the Korean channel JTBC on 6 January. In their news coverage, they indicated that the station was Kami-Shirataki Station and it also caused a mistake on the timetable as this station only had one train in each direction. They continued by saying that the reason the station had not closed yet is that is it was still being used by a few residents and it showed that Japan is a society that does not give up, even for one person.

The most frequently cited origin of the story is a Facebook post in English by the Chinese television network CCTV News on 8 January. The post said that the station was scheduled to close three years ago, but when JR discovered that a young girl was using it, they changed their mind and waited for her to graduate on 26 March and the train ran on a timetable based on when the girl needed to go to school and back. Most of the information on the post is actually not accurate as there is no known causality between the fact that Harada used the station and it staying open. In an article, Harada said that taking the train at this station allowed her to sleep a bit longer as otherwise she would have needed to take the same train one station earlier at Shirataki station. The date that the station closed is only a coincidence. JR updates their timetables every year in March, which just happened to be the end of the school year in Japan.

Some media went as far as to suggest that she was the only passenger in a train that runs twice a day only for her, but she was not the only passenger and more trains were using the line, just not stopping at the station.

Other news outlets tried to debunk the news, like The Straits Times that mistakenly suggest that Harada was taking the train at the station along with ten other schoolmates, while others properly pointed out that the other students were already on the train.

== Surrounding area ==
- National Route 333
- Yūbetsu River

== See also ==
- List of railway stations in Japan
