= 2014 Nagano gubernatorial election =

Japanese gubernatorial election

- 10 August 2014
- Turnout: 43.56 ▼9.24
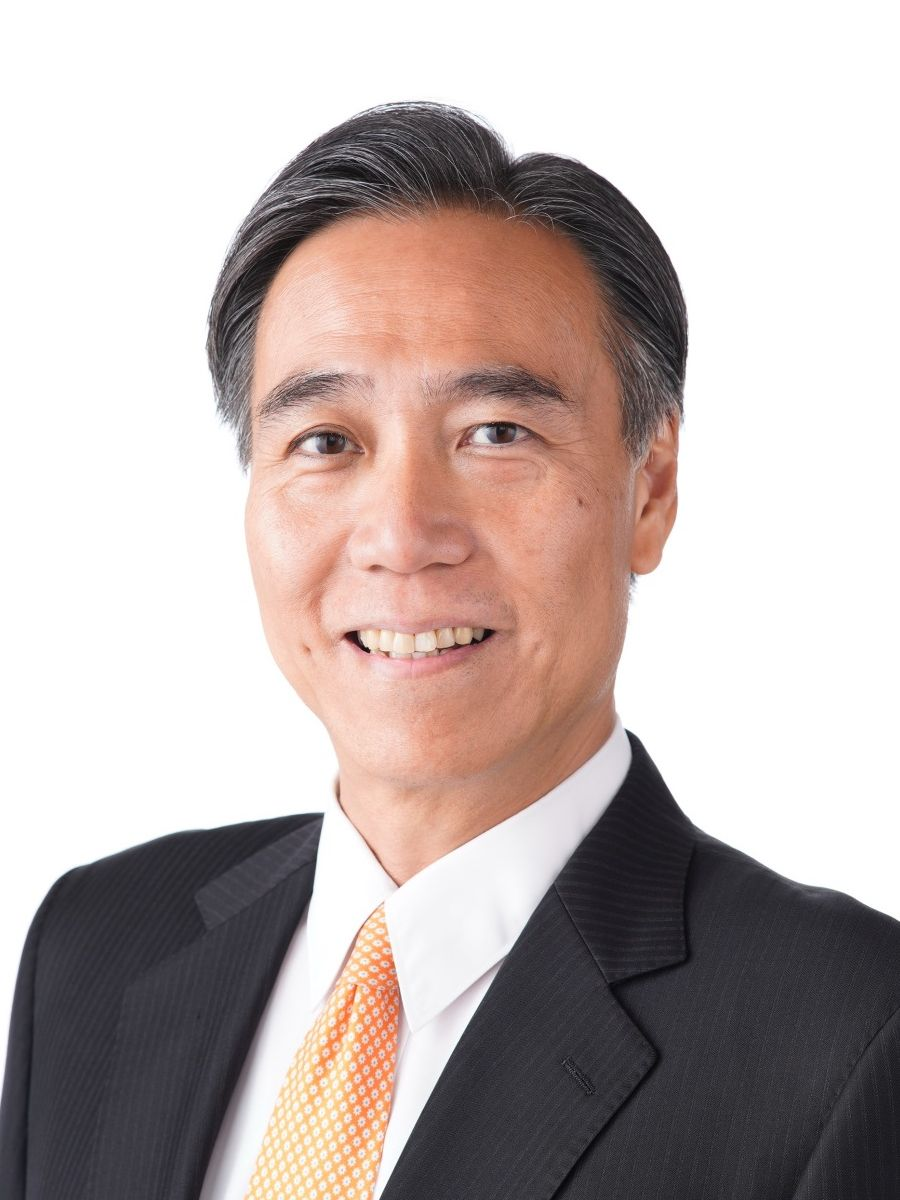
Candidate	Shuichi Abe	Shumpo Noguchi
Party	Independent	JCP
Popular vote	626,426	106,120
Percentage	84.22%	14.27%
Governor before election
Shuichi Abe
Democratic
Elected Governor
Shuichi Abe
Democratic

The 2014 Nagano gubernatorial election was held on 10 August 2014 to elect the next governor of Nagano (長野県, Nagano-ken), a prefecture of Japan located in the Chūbu region of Honshu island. Incumbent Governor Shuichi Abe was re-elected for a second term, defeating Shumpo Noguchi with 84.22% of the vote.

== Candidates ==
- Shuichi Abe, 53, incumbent since 2010, bureaucrat, former Nagano vice governor (2001–2004). Backed by DPJ, he was also supported by LDP, Yui no To, Komeito, SDP and Kokoro.
- Shumpo Noguchi, 71, honorary professor at Shinshu University. Presented by the JCP.
- Takashi Negami, 64, a company president.

== Results ==
Nagano gubernatorial 2014
Party	Candidate	Votes	%	±%
Democratic	Shuichi Abe *	626,426	84.22	▲44.37
JCP	Shumpo Noguchi	106,120	14.27	▼6.57
	Takashi Negami	11,209	1.51	n/a
Turnout		752.538	43,56	▼9.24
Registered electors		1.727.409		
Democratic hold		Swing	69.95	
