= Shimo-Shirataki Station =

Former railway station in Engaru, Hokkaido, Japan

Coordinates: 43.9447°N 143.2766°E

Shimo-Shirataki Station 下白滝駅
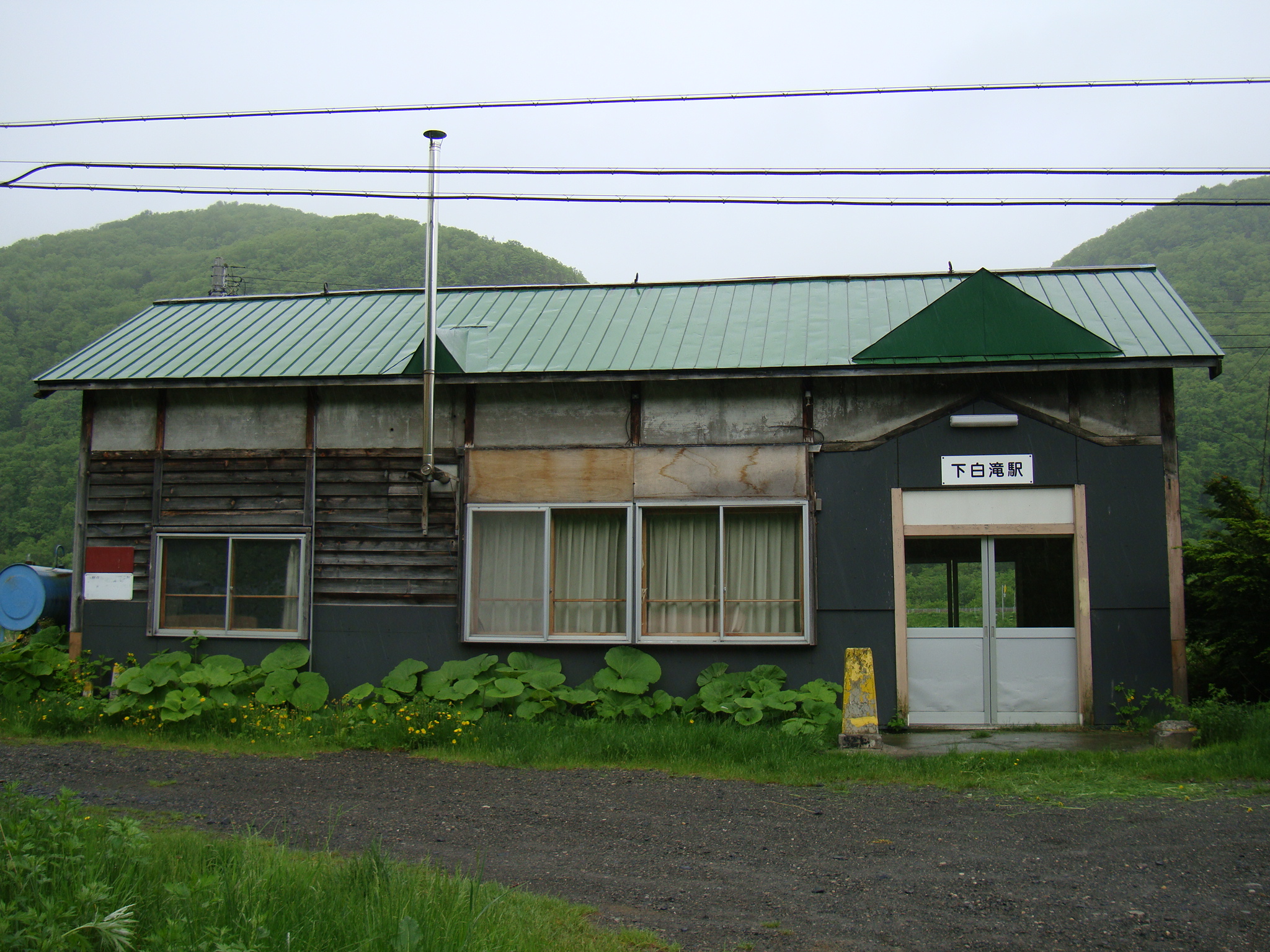
- Shimo-Shirataki Station building in June 2009

General information
- Location: Shimoshirataki, Engaru-cho, Monbetsu-gun, Hokkaido 099–0101; Japan
- Operator: Hokkaido Railway Company
- Line: ■ Sekihoku Main Line
- Distance: 92.7 km (57.6 mi) from Shin-Asahikawa
- Platforms: 2 side platforms
- Tracks: 2

Other information
- Status: Closed
- Station code: A47

History
- Opened: 12 August 1929
- Closed: 25 March 2016
Location
- Location within Japan

Shimo-Shirataki Station (下白滝駅, Shimo-Shirataki-eki; lit. "Lower Shirataki") was a railway station on the Sekihoku Main Line in Engaru, Hokkaido, Japan, operated by Hokkaido Railway Company (JR Hokkaido). Opened in 1929, the station closed in March 2016.

== Lines ==
Shimo-Shirataki Station was served by the single-track Sekihoku Main Line, lying 92.7 km (57.6 mi) from the official starting point of the line at Shin-Asahikawa. The station was numbered "A47".

== Station layout ==
The station had two side platforms serving two tracks on the otherwise single-track line. The station was unstaffed, but had a station structure and waiting room.

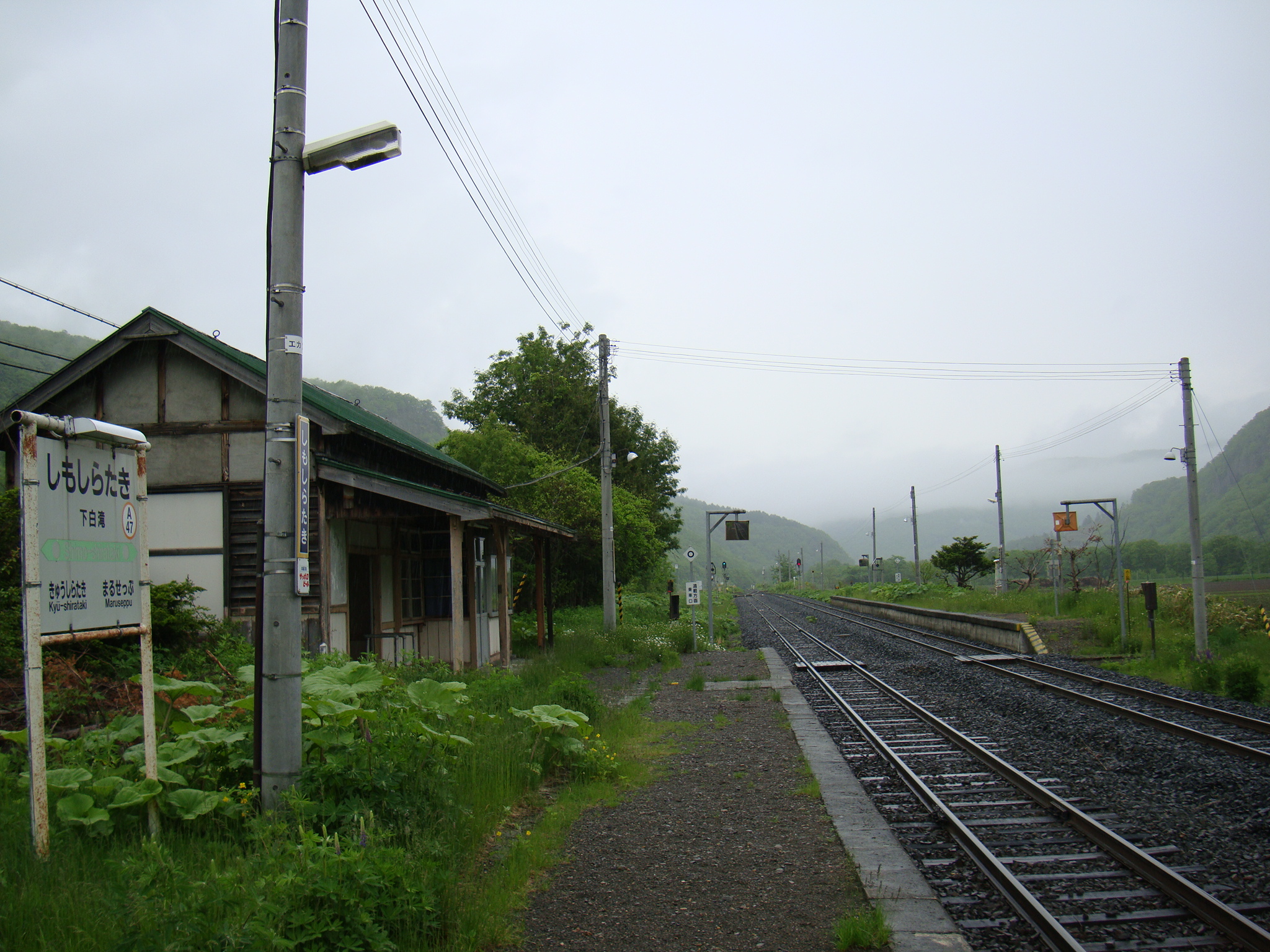
The station platforms in June 2009

== Adjacent stations ==
«	Service	»
Sekihoku Main Line
Limited Express Okhotsk: Does not stop at this station
Limited Express Taisetsu: Does not stop at this station
Limited Rapid Kitami: Does not stop at this station
Kyū-Shirataki	Local	Maruseppu

== History ==
The station opened on 12 August 1929. With the privatization of Japanese National Railways (JNR) on 1 April 1987, the station came under the control of JR Hokkaido.

In July 2015, JR Hokkaido announced that it would be closing the station along with three others on the line (Kyū-Shirataki Station, Kami-Shirataki Station, and Kanehana Station) in March 2016, due to low passenger usage.

The station closed following the last day of services on 25 March 2016.

== Surrounding area ==
- National Route 333
- Yūbetsu River

== See also ==
- List of railway stations in Japan
