= 2014 Shiga gubernatorial election =

- 13 July 2014
- Turnout: 50.15 ▼11.41
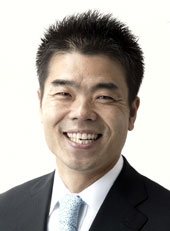
Candidate	Taizo Mikazuki	Takashi Koyari
Party	Independent	Liberal Democratic
Popular vote	253,728	240,652
Percentage	46.33%	43.94%
Governor before election
Yukiko Kada
SDP
Elected Governor
Taizo Mikazuki
Independent

A gubernatorial election was held on 11 July 2014 to elect the next governor of Shiga (石川県, Shiga-ken), a prefecture of Japan located in the Kansai region of Honshu island.

== Candidates ==
- Yukiko Kada, incumbent since 2002, 64, former Kyoto Seika University Professor is not seeking an re election. She backed Taizo Mikazuki.
- Taizo Mikazuki, 43, an ex-lawmaker of the DPJ, also endorsed by the SDP.
- Takashi Koyari, 47, a former Ministry of Economy, Trade and Industry official. He was supported by the LDP, Komeito and Ishin no Kai.
- Ikuo Tsubota, 55, junior high school teacher, endorsed by JCP.

== Results ==
Shiga Gubernatorial election, 2014
Party	Candidate	Votes	%	±%
Democratic	Taizo Mikazuki	253,728	46.33	▼16.84
LDP	Takashi Koyari	240,652	43.94	▲12,54
JCP	Ikuo Tsubota	53,280	9.73	▲4,30
Turnout		554.078	50,15	▼11.41
Registered electors		1,104,765		
Swing to Democratic from Social Democratic		Swing	2.39	
