= 2016 Okinawa prefectural election =

← 2012	5 June 2016	2020 →

All 48 seats in the Okinawa Prefectural Assembly 25 seats needed for a majority
- Turnout: 53.31%
	First party	Second party	Third party
Party	LDP	Social Democratic	JCP
Alliance	Parliamentary opposition	Government	Government
Last election	13 seats	5 seats	5 seats
Seats before	13	5	5
Seats after	14	6	6
Seat change	▲1	▲1	▲1
	Fourth party	Fifth party	Sixth party
Party	Komeito	Okinawa Social Mass	Ishin
Alliance	Neutral (politics)	Government	Neutral (politics)
Last election	4 seats	2 seats	2 seats
Seats before	4	2	2
Seats after	4	3	2
Seat change	Steady	▲1	Steady

Prefectural Assembly elections were held in Okinawa Prefecture on 5 June 2016. The election resulted in victory to the camp supporting Governor Takeshi Onaga who won 27 seats, up from 24 seats before the election. 53.31% turned out in the election, an increase of 0.82% from the historic low turnout in 2012.

== Campaign ==
This election is viewed as crucial to Prime Minister Shinzo Abe's government plan to relocate the Futenma Air Base in Ginowan to Henoko. Governor Takeshi Onaga's camp, which opposes the relocation plan, had 24 seats going into the election.

== Results ==
Party or alliance		Seats	+/–
Pro-Onaga	Social Democratic Party	6	+1
Pro-Onaga	Japanese Communist Party	6	+1
Pro-Onaga	Okinawa Social Mass Party	3	+1
Pro-Onaga	Yui no Kai	3	+1
Pro-Onaga	Independents	9	–1
Pro-Onaga	Total	27	+3
Opposition	Liberal Democratic Party	14	+1
Opposition	Independents	1	0
Opposition	Total	15	+1
Neutral	Komeito	4	0
Neutral	Initiatives from Osaka	2	0
Neutral	Independents	0	–2
Neutral	Total	6	–2
Total		48	0
Source: NHK

== Aftermath ==
The results is interpreted as a sign of growing opposition against the Henoko move, especially after the murder case involving a US base worker several weeks before the election. There is a renewed push to review the Status of Forces Agreement between the Japanese and American governments, in place since 1960.

The battle for the Okinawa seat in the House of Councillors election in July will be closely watched. The incumbent, Minister for Okinawa Affairs Aiko Shimajiri is expected to face a tough fight against the former mayor of Ginowan Yoichi Iha. The large anti-base rally planned on 19 June can become an indicator of the local voters mood going into 10 July.
