= Hiroshi Yoshino =

Japanese poet

Hiroshi Yoshino 吉野弘
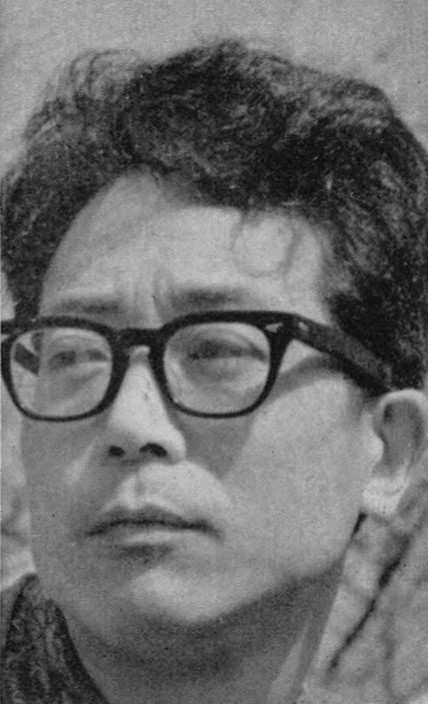
- Born: 1926; Yamagata Prefecture, Japan
- Died: 15 January 2014 (aged 87); Fuji, Shizuoka Prefecture, Japan
- Education: Yamagata Prefectural Sakata Commercial High School
- Occupation: Poet
- Years active: 1944–2014

Hiroshi Yoshino (Japanese: 吉野弘; 1926 – 15 January 2014) was a Japanese poet.

Hiroshi Yoshino died from pneumonia on the night of 15 January 2014, aged 87, in Fuji, Shizuoka Prefecture.
