= Yoshihiko Funazaki =

Japanese writer and manga artist

Yoshihiko Funazaki (舟崎 克彦, Funazaki Yoshihiko; February 2, 1945 – October 15, 2015) was a Japanese novelist, poet, illustrator, manga artist, songwriter, and assistant professor of Shirayuri College. He has written more than 300 books.

== Biography ==
Funazaki was born to a wealthy family in Tokyo. After graduating from Gakushuin University in 1968, he worked as a songwriter, screenwriter, and illustrator while working in a real estate company. In 1969, while he had leave of absence, he and Yasuko Funazaki, his wife, started to write a nonsense tale, Tonkachi to Hanashōgun (トンカチと花将軍, The Hammer and the Flowery General). In 1971, he resigned from the company and made his debut as a novelist.

In 1973, he wrote Poppen Sensei no Nichiyōbi (ぽっぺん先生の日曜日, The Sunday of Professor Poppen). The next year, the second novel of this series, Poppen Sensei to Kaerazu no Numa (ぽっぺん先生と帰らずの沼, Professor Poppen and the Swamp of No Return) won Akaitori Bungaku Shō (赤い鳥文学賞, The Redbird Literary Prize).

His autobiographical Ame no Dōbutsuen (雨の動物園, The Rainy Zoo) won Sankei Jidō Shuppan Bunka Shō (The Sankei Child Books Publishing and Culture Award) in 1975, and was selected as "Honor List" of Hans Christian Andersen Award in 1976 respectively. In 1976, Anoko ga Mieru (あのこがみえる, I can see that girl) was nominated for the Graphic Award at the Bologna International Book Fair.

In 1983, Q wa sekaiichi (Q はせかいいち, Q is best in the world) won Sankei Jidō Shuppan Bunka Shō. In 1984, Hakamadare (はかまだれ) won Ehon Nippon Shō (絵本にっぽん賞, Japanese Picture Books Prize). In 1986, Kazehiki Tamago (かぜひきたまご, Coughing Eggs) won Sankei Jidō Shuppan Bunka Shō.

In 1989, Poppen Sensei series won Robō no Ishi Bungakushō (路傍の石文学賞, The Roadside Stone Literary Prize).

Funazaki died on October 15, 2015, at the age of 70 in Mitaka, Tokyo.

== Detective Conan investigation ==
Around 1996, Funazaki was informed by a reader that Detective Conan, had similarities to Picasso-kun no tantei note. Funazaki checked Detective Conan and "verified close resemblances." Funazaki considered "these resemble points has possibility of coincidence," so he contacted Shogakukan. Funazaki was told, "The creator (Gosho Aoyama) might not have read Picasso-kun no tantei note. But I can't deny the possibility that one of his staff members was amused at the situation of Picasso-kun no tantei note and suggested as an idea." (Funazaki had not read any other volume except the first, because he considered that "It is ridiculous that he gave the royalties from Conan books to Gosho Aoyama.") Later, he wrote about this inquiry process in the quarterly magazine Parolu, where he declared, "There is no responsibility (責任の所在がない)," "I'll fall into evil way (グレてやる)".

Funazaki was offended at the response, and he published the third book as a protest against Aoyama.

== Bibliography ==
=== Professor Poppen Series ===
1. 1973 Poppen Sensei no Nichiyōbi (ぽっぺん先生の日曜日) Chikuma Shobo, Tokyo, ISBN 4-480-88006-2
2. 1974 Poppen Sensei to Kaerazu no Numa (ぽっぺん先生と帰らずの沼) Chikuma Shobo, Tokyo, ISBN 4-480-88009-7
3. 1976 Poppen Sensei to Waraukamomegō (ぽっぺん先生と笑うカモメ号) Chikuma Shobo, Tokyo, ISBN 4-480-88018-6
4. 1977 Poppen Sensei to Doro no Ōji (ぽっぺん先生とどろの王子) Chikuma Shobo, Tokyo, ISBN 4-480-88022-4
5. 1979 Poppen Sensei no Dōbutsu Jiten (ぽっぺん先生の動物事典) Chikuma Shobo, Tokyo, ISBN 4-480-88030-5
6. 1983 Poppen Sensei Jigoku he Yōkoso (ぽっぺん先生地獄へようこそ) Chikuma Shobo, Tokyo, ISBN 4-480-88040-2
7. 1988 Poppen Sensei to Hoshi no Joō (ぽっぺん先生と鏡の女王) Chikuma Shobo, Tokyo, ISBN 4-480-88090-9
8. 1991 Poppen Sensei to Hoshi no Hakobune (ぽっぺん先生と星の箱舟) Chikuma Shobo, Tokyo, ISBN 4-480-88095-X
9. 1994 Poppen Sensei no Christmas (ぽっぺん先生のクリスマス) Chikuma Shobo, Tokyo, ISBN 4-480-88097-6

=== Picasso-kun Series ===
Picasso-kun (ピカソ君) is a fictional character in a series of Japanese children's booksPicasso-kun no tantei note(Picasso's case file) created by Funazaki. He himself illustrated these books.

Picasso's real name is Mitsumoto Sugimoto (杉本光素, Sugimoto Mitsumoto). He is a sixth grader at Sakuramachi Elementary School and looks like an ordinary schoolboy, but his actual age is 23. Ten years prior, he was severely wounded while he was playing baseball; he then physically stopped growing, so he appears to be an ordinary kid but is mentally older.

After his injury his father, a diplomat, took him to England. While being raised there, he became a Sherlock Holmes admirer. After returning to Japan, he came back to the elementary school, and established a detective office. He wears glasses, long boots, a suit and a tie.(But, these similarities Funazaki described are all extremely common s in manga. For example, The motif of little detective who wears suit and tie (bow tie) is used by Osamu Tezuka, Mitsuteru Yokoyama, Fujiko Fujio.) His circumstances are well known by society. So he is allowed to drink alcoholic drinks and smoke a cigar. And he has a driver's license.

1. 1983 Picasso-kun no tantei chō(Picasso's case file) (ピカソ君の探偵帳) Fukuinkan Shoten, Tokyo, ISBN 978-4-8340-0929-3
  1. 1994 Picasso-kun no tantei note (ピカソ君の探偵ノート) [retitled] Parol-sha, Tokyo, ISBN 978-4-89419-117-4
2. 1995 The macaroni au gratin murder case (マカロニグラタン殺人事件) Parol-sha, Tokyo, ISBN 978-4-89419-126-6
3. 2000 The great baseball player murder plan (大リーガー殺人計画) Parol-sha, Tokyo, ISBN 978-4-89419-220-1
