= 2014 Ishikawa gubernatorial election =

Japanese gubernatorial election

- 16 March 2014
- Turnout: 44.98 ▼3.15
Governor before election
Masanori Tanimoto
SDP
Elected Governor
Masanori Tanimoto
SDP

A gubernatorial election was held on 16 March 2014 to elect the next governor of Ishikawa (山口県, Ishikawa-ken), a prefecture of Japan located in the Chūbu region of Honshu island.

== Candidates ==
- Masanori Tanimoto, 68, incumbent since 1994, endorsed by SDP, Komeito, LDP, DPJ.
- Yuichiro Kawa, 42, a former prefectural DPJ assembly member.
- Yoshinobu Kimura, 62, endorsed by JCP.

== Results ==
Ishikawa gubernatorial 2014
Party	Candidate	Votes	%	±%
Social Democratic	Masanori Tanimoto *	285,242	68.91	▲2.20
Democratic	Yuichiro Kawa	94,212	22.76	▼0.89
JCP	Yoshinobu Kimura	34,464	8.33	▲0.72
Turnout		420.135	44,98	▼3.15
Registered electors		933,967		
Social Democratic hold		Swing	▲2.20	
