= Naomi Kawashima =

Japanese actress and talent (1960–2015)

Naomi Kawashima (川島 なお美, Kawashima Naomi; November 10, 1960 – September 24, 2015) was a Japanese actress, singer and radio entertainer. She was born on November 10, 1960, in the city of Moriyama, Aichi (now Moriyama-ku, Nagoya, Aichi Prefecture), Japan and graduated from Aoyama Gakuin University. She made her singing debut in 1979; in 1982 she got an early break on the television show Owarai Manga Dōjō. Noteworthy radio and television appearances include Miss DJ Request Parade (radio, 1981), Expo Scramble (1985), Wakamono no Subete (1994), Meibugyō Tōyama no Kin-san (1995), Shitsurakuen (1997), Magarikado no Kanojo (2005) and Shichinin no Onna Bengoshi (2006). She is the subject of several photo books, including Woman (1993). Despite Kawashima's impressive performance in Toshiharu Ikeda's 1997 theatrical film The Key, the movie has become known as one of the first two Japanese film to show non-fogged full frontal female nudity after the rules against depicting pubic hair had been relaxed. Kawashima died on September 24, 2015, from bile duct cancer. She was 54.

== Filmography ==
=== Dramas ===
- Keiji 110 kg 2 (TV Asahi / 2014) - Miyuki Akiba (ep.6-2)
- Egoist (Fuji TV / 2009)
- 4 Shimai Tantei Dan (TV Asahi / 2008)
- Oniyome nikki: Ii yu da na (Fuji TV / 2007)
- Seven Female Lawyers | Shichinin no onna bengoshi (TV Asahi / 2006)
- New Woman of the Crime Lab 7 | Shin Kasouken no Onna (TV Asahi / 2006) - ep.5
- At Home Dad - Iwasaki Marie (Fuji TV / 2004)
- The Aaah Detective Agency | Aatantei Jimusho (TV Asahi / 2004)
- Beauty Seven (NTV / 2001)
- Kizudarake no Love Song (Fuji TV / 2001)
- The Chef (NTV / 1995)
- Wakamono no Subete (Fuji TV / 1994)

=== Movies ===
- The Key (鍵, Kagi) (1997)
- Mokka no koibito (2002)
- Ghost Shout (2010)
- Chai Koi (2013)
