= Iwao Akiyama =

Japanese artist

Iwao Akiyama (秋山 巌, Akiyama Iwao; March 21, 1921 – September 15, 2014) was a Japanese woodblock printmaker and artist known for distinctive prints of owls, cats, and other animals in the style of naive or folk art.

Akiyama was born in 1921 in Takeda, Ōita Prefecture, on the island of Kyushu. He studied drawing under the direction of a Buddhist monk during his childhood, then at the Taiheiyo Bijutsu Gakkō, graduating 1956. He originally pursued suiboku-ga, a type of ink painting. However, Akiyama changed his focus to woodblock printing after meeting Shikō Munakata, under whom he studied from 1959 until 1965.

Akiyama's prints are primarily made in black ink, and early ones contained a single red dot within the image, although later works sometimes feature more colors. In his prints, Akiyama limited himself to few subjects: animals, nude female figures, Buddhist deities and Buddhist monks. Akiyama's work often incorporated verses of haiku and other text by Japanese poets like Ryōkan Taigu, Kobayashi Issa, and Zen monk Santōka Taneda, as well as from his own original poetry.

Iwao Akiyama died in Matsudo, Chiba, on September 15, 2014, at the age of 93.

== Collections ==
Examples of Akiyama's prints are currently held within the collections of the following institutions:

- British Museum
- Cincinnati Art Museum
- National Gallery of Victoria
- National Museum of Scotland
- Tikotin Museum of Japanese Art
- The U.S. Library of Congress

== See also ==
- Woodblock printing in Japan
