= Hisahiko Okazaki =

Japanese politician and diplomat (1930–2014)

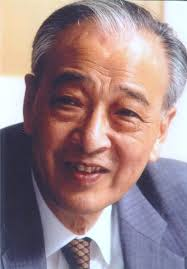

Japan Ambassador to Saudi Arabia
- In office 1984–1988

Japan Ambassador to Thailand
- In office 1988–1992

Personal details
- Born: 8 April 1930 Dalian, Manchukuo
- Died: 26 October 2014 (aged 84) Tokyo, Japan

Hisahiko Okazaki (岡崎 久彦, Okazaki Hisahiko) (April 8, 1930 – October 26, 2014) was a Japanese diplomat, political commentator, and director of the Okazaki Institute in Tokyo.

== Education ==
Okazaki was born in Kwantung Leased Territory, Dalian, China. His grandfather was Okazaki Kunisuke, who was the first cousin of Mutsu Munemitsu.

After passing the diplomat examination in 1952, Okazaki withdrew from the University of Tokyo (Faculty of Law) and began his career as a diplomat. He received a B.A and M.A. in Economics from Trinity College, Cambridge in 1955.

== Diplomatic career ==
Between 1978 and 1981 Okazaki served as director general for foreign relations at the Japan Defense Agency. From 1981 to 1984 he served as minister at the Japanese Embassy in Washington D.C. In 1984-1988 he served as ambassador to Saudi Arabia, and in 1988-1992 as ambassador to Thailand. In 1992 he retired from the diplomatic service, and worked as senior adviser to Hakuhodo Inc. until 1995. From 1995 onward, he was the director of the Okazaki Institute and a personal adviser to several Prime Ministers of Japan.

== Political impact ==
- Okazaki deemed strong ties with the United States to be vial for the future of Asia. For Japan to continue its alliance with the US, he thought it was necessary to increase the national defense budget above the traditional 1 percent of the GDP,
- Regarding the China-Taiwan dispute, Okazaki was of the opinion that a unification between the People's Republic of China and Taiwan would be detrimental to human rights in Taiwan.
- Okazaki served as an advisor to Shinzo Abe on foreign affairs.
- Okazaki joined the Japanese Society for History Textbook Reform. He deleted any inappropriate anti-American passages from the textbook.
- As one of his life projects, Okazaki wrote a five-volume work on the diplomatic history of modern Japan, which is now also available in English.

== Works (English) ==
- Between Friends: Japanese Diplomats Look at Japan-U.S. Relations with Hiroshi Kitamura and Ryohei Murata, trans. Daniel R. Zoll (New York: Weatherhill, 1985)
- From Uraga to San Francisco: A Century of Japanese Diplomacy 1853-1952 (Tokyo: Japan Echo, inc., 2007)
- Mutsu Munemitsu and His Time trans. Makito Noda (Tokyo: Japan Publishing Industry Foundation for Culture, 2018)
- Komura Jutaro and His Time trans. Makito Noda (Tokyo: Japan Publishing Industry Foundation for Culture, 2020)
- Shidehara Kijuro and His Time trans. Makito Noda (Tokyo: Japan Publishing Industry Foundation for Culture, 2019)
- Shigemitsu and Togo and Their Time trans. Makito Noda (Tokyo: Japan Publishing Industry Foundation for Culture, 2019)
- Yoshida Shigeru and His Time trans. Makito Noda (Tokyo: Japan Publishing Industry Foundation for Culture, 2019)
