= Masayuki Imai =

Japanese playwright and actor (1961–2015)

- Born: 21 April 1961; Toyooka, Hyōgo Prefecture, Japan
- Died: 28 May 2015 (aged 54); Tokyo, Japan
- Occupations: Playwright, actor
- Years active: 1986–2015

Masayuki Imai (今井 雅之, Imai Masayuki; 21 April 1961 – 28 May 2015) was a Japanese playwright and actor.

== Life and career ==
Born in Toyooka, Hyōgo Prefecture, Imai was a member of the Ground Self-Defense Force before starting his acting career in the second half of the 1980s. The founder of the stage company Elle Company, he was the author and the main actor of the play The Winds of God, a 1991 drama he successfully performed for about twenty years. Imai was also active in films, TV series and V-Cinema (direct-to-video) releases.
