= Hanasaki Station (Hokkaido) =

Railway station in Nemuro, Hokkaido, Japan

Coordinates: 43°17′43″N 145°34′31″E

Hanasaki Station 花咲駅
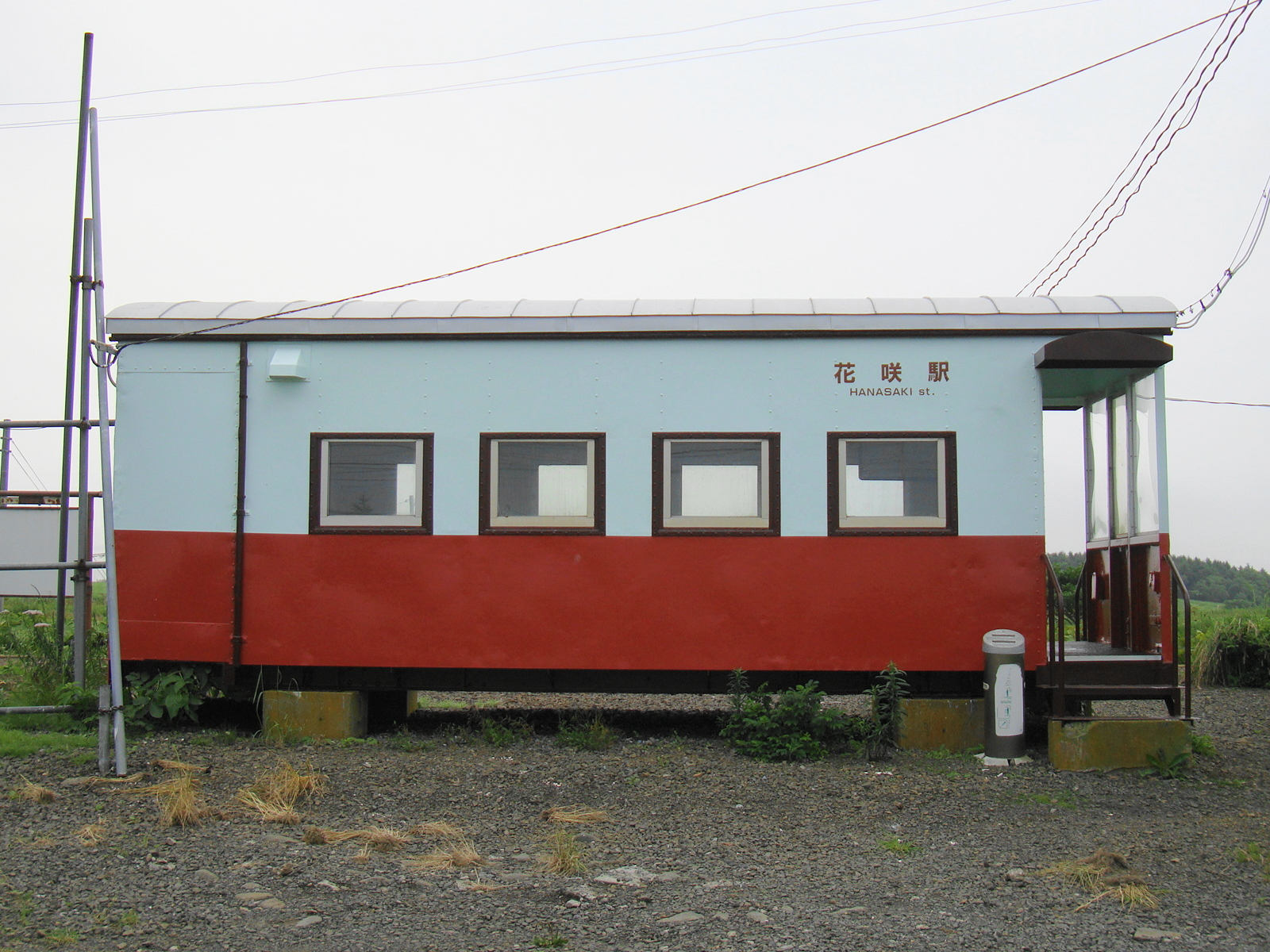
- The station structure in August 2010

General information
- Location: Nemuro-shi, Hokkaido; Japan
- Operator: Hokkaido Railway Company
- Line: ■ Nemuro Main Line
- Distance: 438.2 km from Takikawa
- Platforms: 1 side platforms
- Tracks: 1

Other information
- Status: Closed

History
- Opened: 5 August 1921
- Closed: 25 March 2016
Location
- Location within Japan

Hanasaki Station (花咲駅, Hanasaki-eki) was a railway station on the Nemuro Main Line in Nemuro, Hokkaido, Japan, operated by Hokkaido Railway Company (JR Hokkaido). Opened in 1921, it closed in March 2015.

== Lines ==
Hanasaki Station was served by the Nemuro Main Line, and was situated 438.2 km from the starting point of the line at Takikawa.

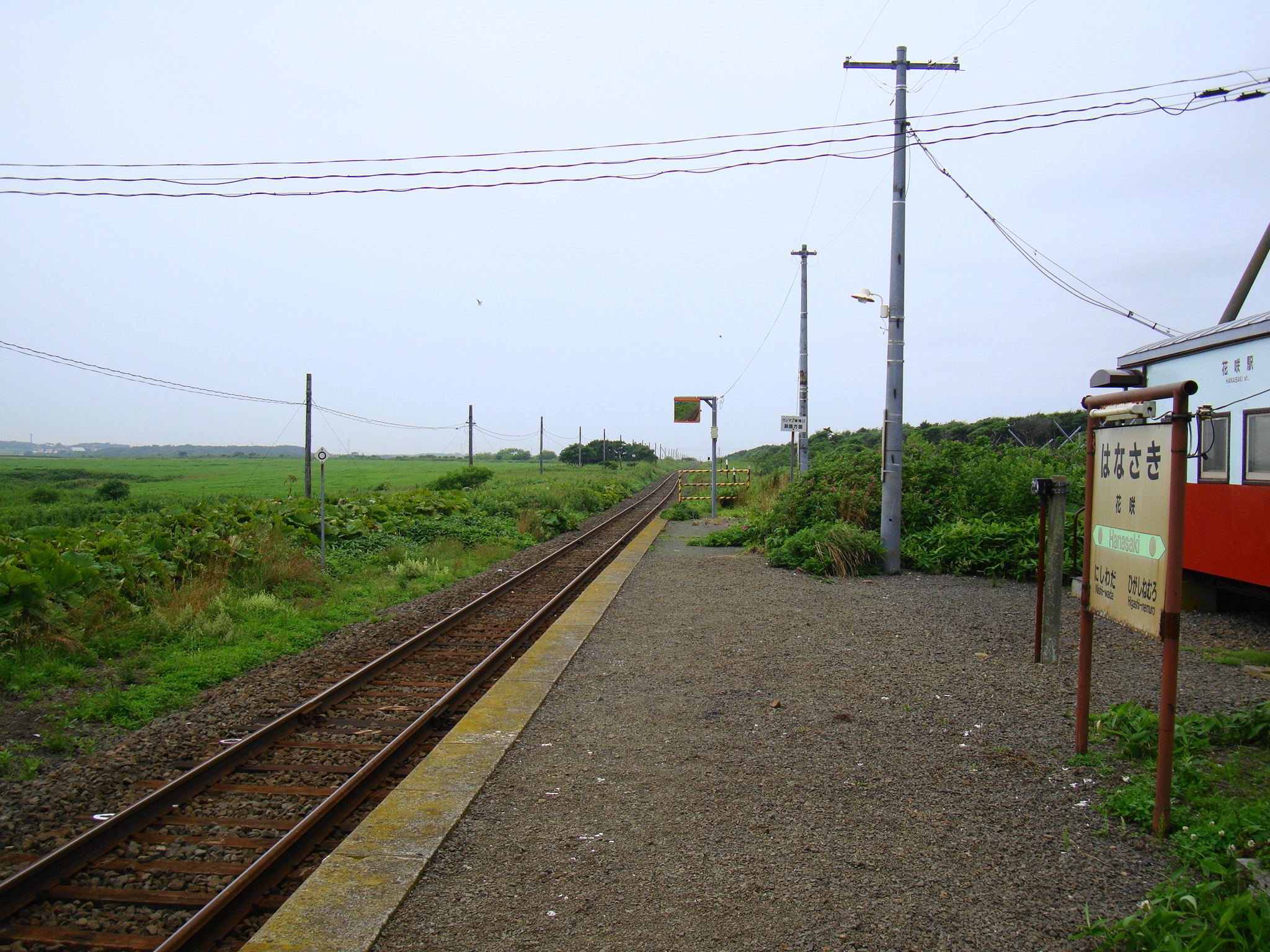
The station platform in August 2010

== History ==
The station opened on 5 August 1921. With the privatization of Japanese National Railways (JNR) on 1 April 1987, the station came under the control of JR Hokkaido.

=== Closure ===
In September 2015, it was announced that JR Hokkaido planned to close this station in March 2016. The station closed following the last day of services on 25 March 2016.

== See also ==
- List of railway stations in Japan
