= Saizo Kishimoto =

Saizō Kishimoto (岸本 才三, Kishimoto Saizō; May 15, 1928 – January 17, 2014) was a Japanese gangster.

Born in Kobe, he joined the Japanese Imperial Navy air squadron during World War II. After the war, he became a city employee of the Kobe City Office. In 1955, he joined a clan with Yakuza leader Nakayama Yoshikazu under a branch of the Yamaguchi-gumi. Over the next 40 years, he rose up the ladder in his gang and held the rank of sō-honbuchō, the headquarters chief of the Yamaguchi-gumi.

In 1973, he was promoted from Shateigashira" (舎弟頭 head of younger brothers) of the Nakayama-gumi to a member of the third Yamaguchi after Nakayama retired. In June 1984, he go the position of both "Honbucho" (本部長 top of headquarters) and "Wakagashira-hosa" (若頭補佐 eldest son's assistant) for the fourth Yamaguchi-gumi. When the fifth Yamaguchi started in 1989, he was promoted to shatei and assumed the position of "Sohonbucho" (総本部長 top of general headquarters). He acted for the "Wakagashira" and the "Shateigashira" for the Yamaguchi-gumi since October of 1998.

In late 2005, he was named leader of a more recent Yamaguchi-gumi clan, called the Hanshin-kai. He was also the godfather or kumichō of the Kishimoto-gumi.
