= Takehiro Kishimoto =

Japanese chef and mukimono food carver (born 1980)

Takehiro Kishimoto (岸本 岳大, Kishimoto Takehiro; born 1980) is a Japanese chef and mukimono food carver. He also practices the Thai methods of fruit and vegetable carving. He works and lives in Kobe, Japan.

He has over 280,000 followers on his Instagram channel. Kishimoto's works have been featured in a variety of leading media platforms, including Designboom.

Kishimoto's art is not only in the actual carvings, but also in the speed in which he swiftly wields his knives, to prevent oxidization of some fruits. He eats almost all of his creations to avoid waste.
