= Mieko Nagaoka =

Japanese swimmer (1914–2021)

Personal information
- Nationality: Japanese
- Born: July 31, 1914 Yamaguchi, Japan
- Died: January 19, 2021 (aged 106)

Mieko Nagaoka (長岡三重子, Nagaoka Mieko; 31 July 1914 – 19 January 2021) was a Japanese Masters athlete. She was the first 100-year-old to complete a 1,500m freestyle swim in a 25m pool. At the age of 106, she was Japan's oldest active swimmer.

== Early life ==
Mieko Nagaoka was born on 31 July 1914 in Yamaguchi, Japan just days after the start of World War I. She started swimming at 80 years old to recover from a knee injury. In the beginning, Nagaoka didn't know how to swim. She used to go in to the swimming pool to do exercises for her knee. At 82, she started to learn how to swim on her own. And because she performed in a Noh (a classical Japanese dancing drama) this was also an incentive for her to learn how to swim so that she could stay in shape for the plays.

== Career ==
She achieved national recognition in Japan at age 90 when she established a world record in the 800m freestyle. Fresh from her success, she started training with a coach and took private swimming lessons with aims to improve her record-breaking performance.

Nagaoka was named as one of the 2014 Top 12 World Masters Swimmers of the Year by Swimming World Magazine.

In 2015 she became the first 100-year-old to complete a 1,500m freestyle swim in a 25m pool. She completed the feat in just over 1 hour and 15 minutes, using backstroke all the way.

Nagaoka trained four times a week for two hours under the tutelage of long-time coach Shintaro Sawada. She liked to swim longer distances because she swam slowly and was able to keep her own pace. She told Japan's Kyodo News agency: "I want to swim until I turn 105 if I can live that long."

In 2016 Nagaoka told AFP “I’m fit as a fiddle,”in an interview after completing the 400 metres freestyle in 26 minutes, 16.81 seconds at a Japan Masters Swimming Association competition in Chiba, on the outskirts of Tokyo. “The secret is to eat well and stay active. It’s no good sitting around at my age. I want to keep swimming until I’m 105 – and beyond that,”

In September 2019 Nagaoka announced her intention to compete at the FINA World Masters Championships held later that month despite injuring her knees in April.

== Personal life ==
Nagaoka latterly lived alone in Tabuse, Yamaguchi, Japan. After turning 100 in July 2014, she released a book entitled: I'm 100 years old and the world's best active swimmer.

She died from respiratory failure in January 2021 at the age of 106.
