= Taizō Mikazuki =

Japanese politician

Taizo Mikazuki
- 三日月 大造
- Official portrait, 2025

Governor of Shiga Prefecture
- Incumbent
- Assumed office 20 July 2014
- Monarchs: Akihito; Naruhito
- Preceded by: Yukiko Kada

Member of the House of Representatives
- In office 10 November 2003 – 9 May 2014
- Preceded by: Mineichi Iwanaga
- Succeeded by: Tatsuo Kawabata
- Constituency: Shiga 3rd (2003–2012); Kinki PR (2012–2014)

Personal details
- Born: 24 May 1971 (age 55) Ōtsu, Shiga, Japan
- Party: Independent
- Other political affiliations: Democratic (2003–2014)
- Education: Hitotsubashi University

Taizo Mikazuki (三日月 大造, Mikazuki Taizō; born 24 May 1971) is a Japanese politician and the current governor of Shiga Prefecture, having been elected to the position in July 2014. He previously served in the House of Representatives in the Diet (national legislature) as a member of the Democratic Party of Japan.

== Career ==
A native of Otsu, Shiga Prefecture, Mikazuki joined the West Japan Railway Company in 1994 after graduating from Hitotsubashi University's Faculty of Economics. From 1999 he was the chairman of the "young and women employees" committee of both the West Japan Railway Trade Union and Japan Railway Trade Unions Confederation. In 2002 he resigned from JR West to study at the Matsushita Institute of Government and Management.

=== National Diet ===
Mikazuki entered the House of Representatives as a member of the Democratic Party of Japan after winning the Shiga No.3 District in the 2003 general election. At the 2005 general election he survived the "hurricane" victory by Junichiro Koizumi's ruling Liberal Democratic Party, retaining his seat by a margin of 266 votes (0.17%) over LDP candidate Osamu Uno.

At the August 2009 election a landslide victory by the Democratic Party brought the party to power under Prime Minister Yukio Hatoyama. Mikazuki retained his seat, this time receiving 60.8% of the vote and defeating Uno by more than 49,000 votes. Mikazuki was made a Vice-Minister of Land, Infrastructure, Transport and Tourism in Hatoyama's cabinet and was promoted to Senior Vice-Minister when Naoto Kan became Prime Minister in June 2010. He lost his position in the cabinet in a September 2010 shuffle and was instead appointed deputy chairman of the party's national policy committee.

At the 2012 general election that returned the conservative Liberal Democratic Party (LDP) to power, Mikazuki lost his district seat to LDP candidate Nobuhide Takamura but remained in the House by winning one of the Kinki Proportional Representation Block seats. He resigned from the Diet in May 2014 to contest the Shiga gubernatorial election in July. He was replaced in the Diet by DPJ member Tatsuo Kawabata, who had lost his Shiga No.4 District seat in the 2012 election but failed to secure a proportional block seat.

== Governor of Shiga Prefecture ==
2014 Shiga gubernatorial election result by municipality. Blue: majority for Mikazuki, green: Koyari. Koyari carried the cities Ōtsu, Takashima und Nagahama on the Northwestern side of the lake and four of the six towns, but Mikazuki won all cities in the Southeast.

Mikazuki won the Shiga gubernatorial election in July 2014 with 46.3% of the vote, defeating the second-placed Takashi Koyari by 13,000 votes.
