= Shuichi Abe =

Governor of Nagano Prefecture

- 阿部 守一
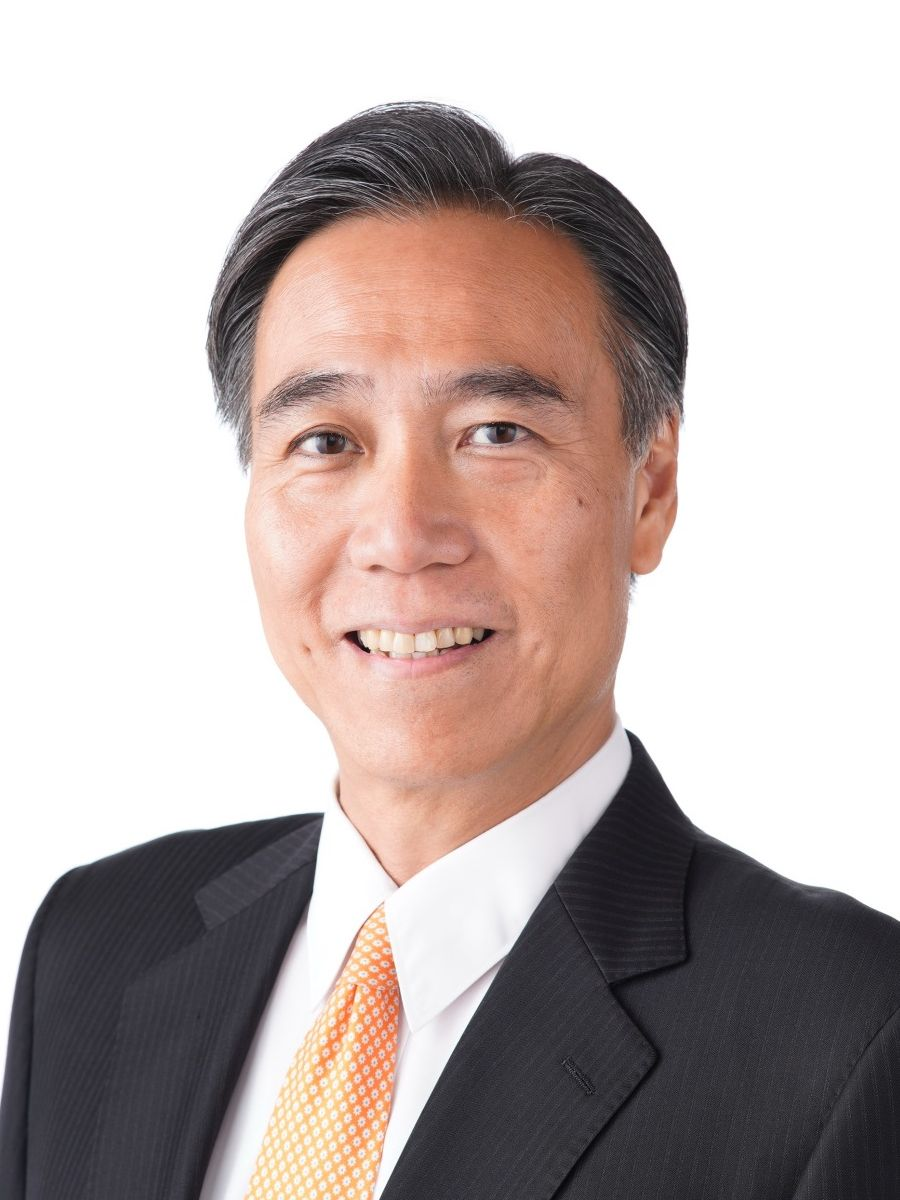
- Official portrait, 2018

Governor of Nagano Prefecture
- Incumbent
- Assumed office 1 September 2010
- Monarchs: Akihito; Naruhito
- Preceded by: Jin Murai

Personal details
- Born: 21 December 1960 (age 65) Kunitachi, Tokyo, Japan
- Party: Independent
- Education: University of Tokyo (B.L. in 1984)

Shuichi Abe (阿部 守一, Abe Shuichi; born 21 December 1960) is a Japanese politician and the current governor of Nagano Prefecture, assuming office in 2010. In 2014, he was re-elected for another four-year term as the governor of the prefecture.
