= Kanehana Station =

Former railway station in Kitami, Hokkaido, Japan

Coordinates: 43.8036°N 143.5712°E

Kanehana Station 金華駅
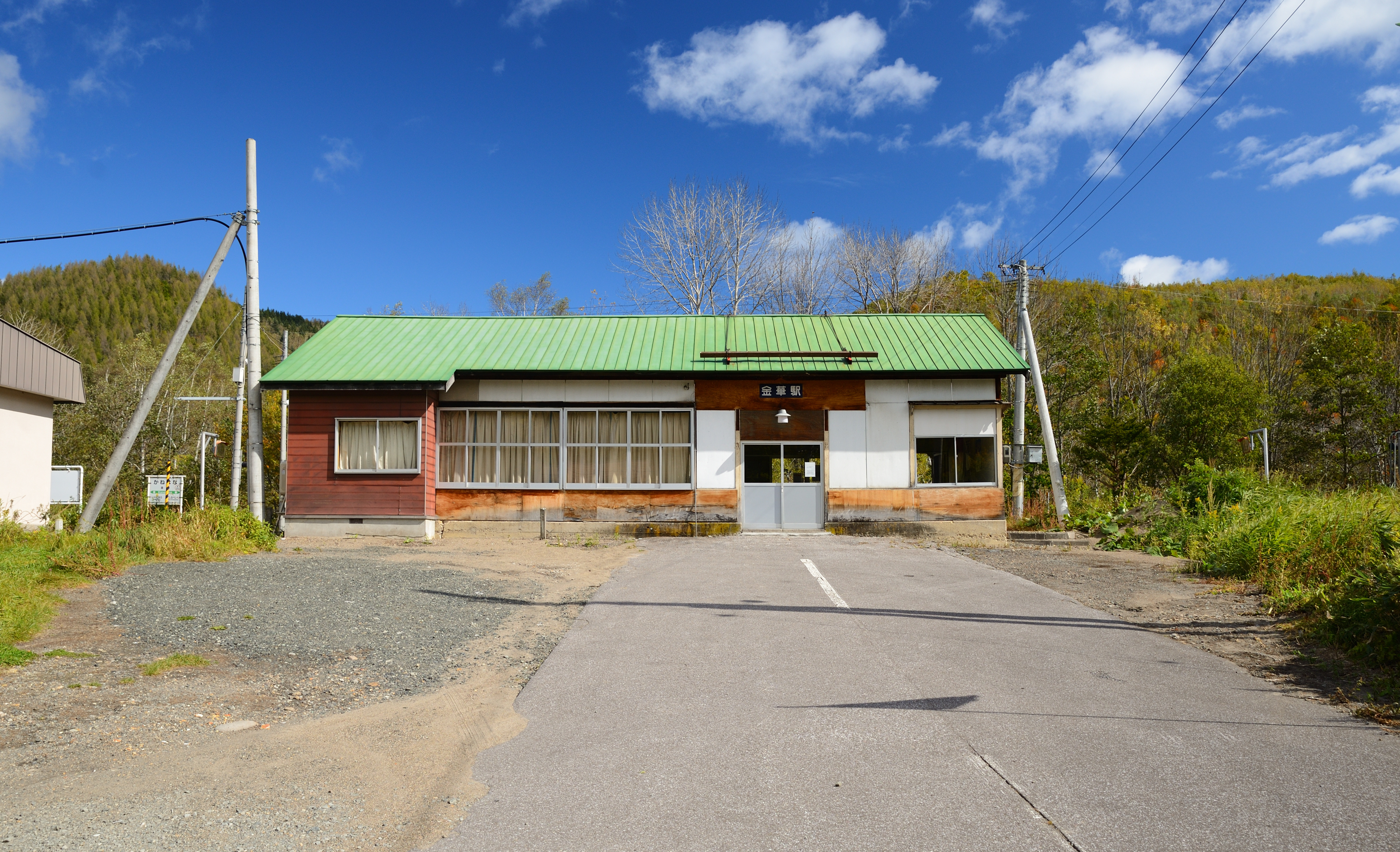
- Kanehana Station in October 2015

General information
- Location: Kitami, Hokkaido （北海道北見市留辺蘂町金華） Japan
- Operator: JR Hokkaido
- Line: ■ Sekihoku Main Line

Other information
- Status: Closed
- Station code: A54

History
- Opened: 5 October 1914
- Closed: 25 March 2016
- Former names: Ponmuka (1914-1951)
Location
- Location within Japan

Kanehana Station (金華駅, Kanehana-eki) was a railway station on the Sekihoku Main Line in Kitami, Hokkaido, Japan, operated by Hokkaido Railway Company (JR Hokkaido). Opened in 1914, the station closed in March 2016.

== Lines ==
Kanehana Station was served by the Sekihoku Main Line, and was unstaffed. It was numbered "A54".

== Layout ==
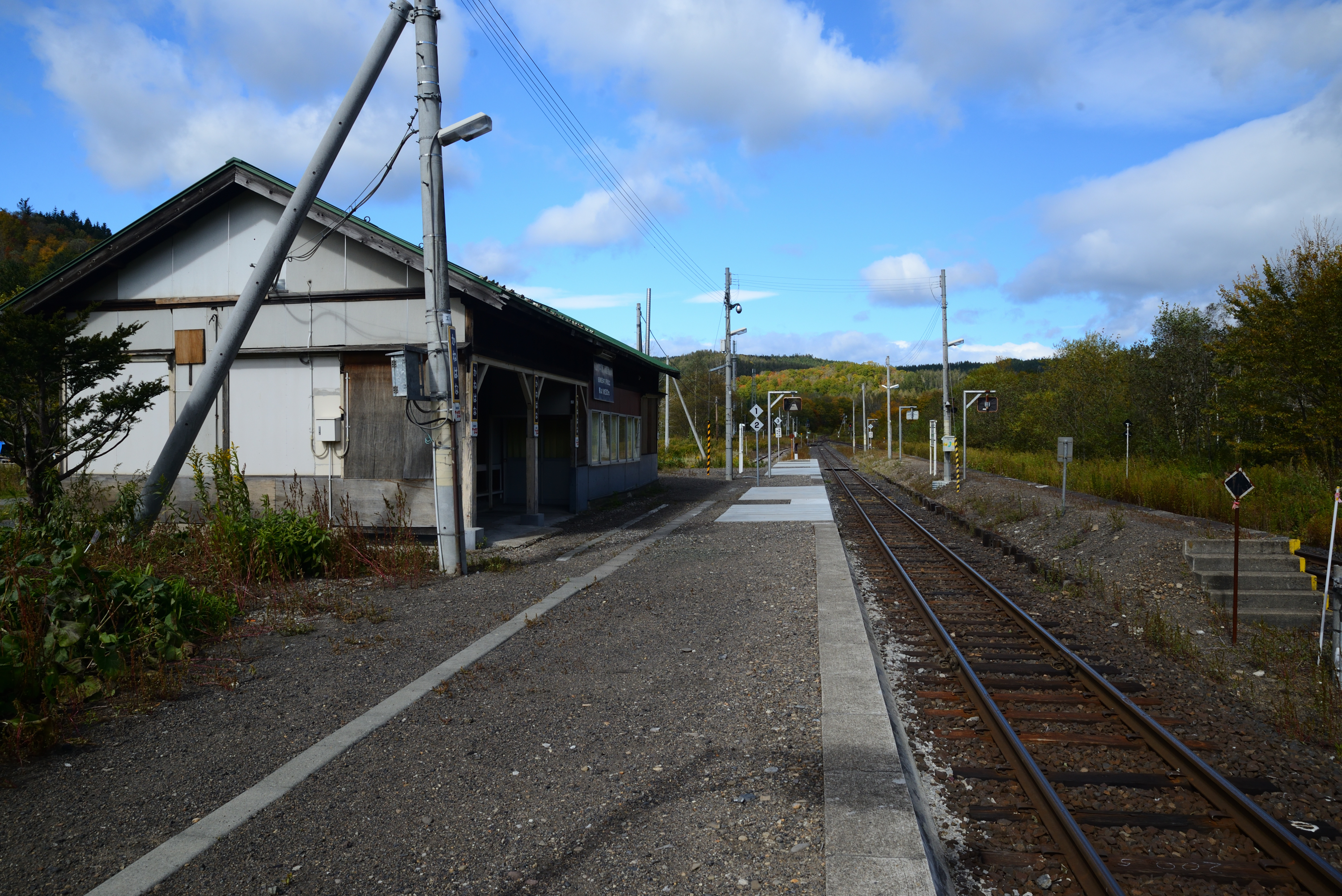
The platform in October 2015

== Adjacent stations ==
«	Service	»
Sekihoku Main Line
Limited Express Okhotsk: Does not stop at this station
Limited Express Taisetsu: Does not stop at this station
Ikutahara	Limited Rapid Kitami	Rubeshibe
Ikutahara	Local	Nishi-Rubeshibe

== History ==
The station opened on 5 October 1914 as Ponmuka Station (奔無加駅). It was renamed Kanehana on 20 July 1951. The station was destaffed in 1983. With the privatization of Japanese National Railways (JNR) on 1 April 1987, the station came under the control of JR Hokkaido.

JR Hokkaido announced in July 2015 that it planned to close the station from the start of the revised timetable in March 2016, citing low passenger usage figures. The station closed following the last day of services on 25 March 2016.

== Surrounding area ==
- National Route 242

== See also ==
- List of railway stations in Japan
