= Hiroshi =

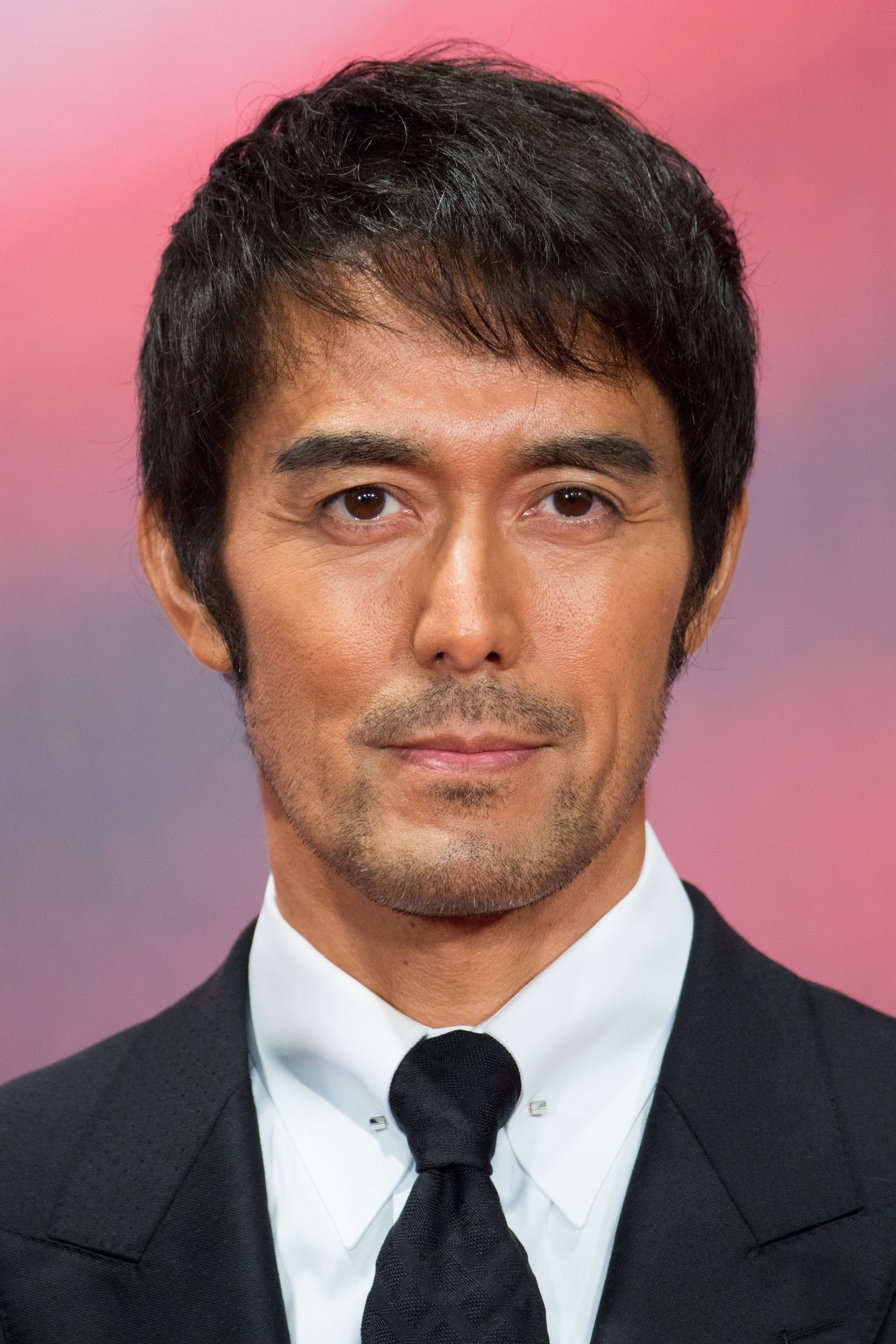
- Hiroshi, a Japanese actor
- Pronunciation: Hí-rò-shí. Can have different pronunciations depending on the language used.
- Gender: Male
- Language: Japanese

Origin
- Origin: Japan
- Meaning: Multiple meanings depending on the kanji used

Other names
- Related names: Hiro, Hiroaki, Hiroki, Hiroko, Hiroka, Hiromi

Hiroshi (ひろし, ヒロシ) is a common masculine Japanese given name. It can also be transliterated as Hirosi.

== Written forms ==
Hiroshi can be written using different kanji characters. Here are some examples:

- 浩, "wide expanse, abundance, vigorous"
- 弘, "vast, broad, wide"
- 宏, "wide, large"
- 寛, "tolerant, leniency, generosity, relax"
- 洋, "ocean, sea, foreign, Western style"
- 博, "large, wide, wise"
- 大, "large, big"
- 広志, "wide, broad, spacious" and "intention, plan, resolve, aspire, hopes"
- 博一, "large, wide, wise" and "one"
- 博司, "large, wide, wise" and "director, official, govt office, rule, administer"
- 博史, "large, wide, wise" and "history, chronicle"

== People with the name ==
- Hiroshi (comedian) (ヒロシ; born 1972), Japanese comedian
- Hiroshi Abe (阿部 寛; born 1964), Japanese actor
- Hiroshi Abe (安部 裕史; born 1958), Japanese astronomer
- Hiroshi Abe (安部 裕史; 1922–????), Japanese war criminal
- Hiroshi Abeysinghe (born 1978), former Sri Lankan international cricketer
- Hiroshi Akutagawa (芥川 比呂志; 1920–1981), Japanese stage and film actor and director
- Hiroshi Amano (天野 浩; born 1960), Japanese physicist, engineer, Nobel Prize winner
- Hiroshi Ando (安藤 尋; born 1965), Japanese screenwriter and film director
- Hiroshi Ando (politician) (安藤 裕; born 1965), Japanese politician
- Hiroshi Aoyama (青山 博一; born 1981), Japanese motorcycle road racer
- Hiroshi Arakawa (荒川 博; 1930–2016), Japanese baseball player
- Hiroshi Araki (荒木 博志; born 1947), Japanese astronomer
- Hiroshi Aramata (荒俣 宏; born 1947), Japanese author, polymath, critic, translator
- Hiroshi Arikawa (有川 博; 1940–2011), Japanese actor and voice actor
- Hiroshi Aro (あろ ひろし; born 1959), Japanese manga artist
- Hiroshi Asai (麻井 寛史; born 1978), Japanese arranger, musician and composer
- Hiroshi Awatsuji (粟辻 博; 1929–1995), Japanese textile designer
- Hiroshi Azuma (東 浩史; born 1987), Japanese football player
- Hiroshi Daimon (大門 宏; born 1962), Japanese former cyclist
- Hiroshi Enatsu (江夏 弘; 1922–2019), Japanese theoretical physicist
- Hiroshi Fujii (藤井 啓史; born 1970), Japanese chief engineer and platform manager
- Hiroshi Fujimoto (baseball) (藤本 博史; born 1963), Japanese former Nippon Professional Baseball infielder
- Hiroshi Fujioka (藤岡 弘; born 1946), Japanese actor
- Hiroshi Fujita (藤田 宏; born 1928), Japanese retired mathematician
- Hiroshi Fujiwara (藤原 ヒロシ; born 1964), Japanese musician, trendsetter, producer, and designer
- Hiroshi Fukuda (福田 弘; born 1942), Japanese retired weightlifter
- Hiroshi Fukumura (福村 博; born 1949), Japanese jazz trombonist
- Hiroshi Fukushima (福嶋 洋; born 1982), Japanese former football player
- Hiroshi Fukutomi (福冨 博; born 1950), Japanese anime director
- Hiroshi Fushida (鮒子田 寛; born 1946), Japanese former racing driver
- Hiroshi Futami (二見 宏志; born 1992), Japanese football defender
- Hiroshi Gamo (ガモ ウひろし; born 1962), Japanese manga artist
- Hiroshi Gohda (合田 洋; born 1964), Japanese professional golfer
- Hiroshi Gondoh (権藤 博; born 1938), Japanese former Nippon Professional Baseball pitcher and manager
- Hiroshi Hamaguchi (濱口 弘; born 1976), Japanese businessman and racing driver
- Hiroshi Hamaya (濱谷 浩; 1915–1999), Japanese photographer
- Hiroshi Hanawa (花輪 博; born 1950), Japanese handball player
- Hiroshi Hara (architect) (原 広司; 1936–2025), Japanese architect and author on architecture
- Hiroshi Hara (botanist) (原 寛; 1911–1986), Japanese botanist
- Hiroshi Harashima (原島 博; born 1945), Japanese researcher
- Hiroshi Haruki (春木 博; born 1997), Japanese mathematician
- Hiroshi Hase (馳 浩; born 1961), Japanese politician and semi-retired professional wrestler
- Hiroshi Hasebe (長谷部 浩; born 1956), Japanese theatre critic and professor
- Hiroshi Hashimoto (fencer) (橋本 寛; born 1964), Japanese fencer
- Hiroshi Hashimoto (water polo) (橋本 博; born 1950), Japanese former water polo player
- Hiroshi Hayano (早野 宏史; born 1955), Japanese former football player and manager
- Hiroshi Hiraguchi (平口 洋; born 1948), Japanese politician
- Hiroshi Hirakawa (平川 弘; born 1965), Japanese former football player
- Hiroshi Hirao (平尾 博嗣; born 1975), Japanese Nippon Professional Baseball player
- Hiroshi Hirata (平田 弘史; 1937–2021), Japanese manga artist
- Hiroshi Hoketsu (法華津 寛; born 1941), Japanese equestrian rider
- Hiroshi Honda (handballer) (本田 洋; born 1947), Japanese former handball player
- Hiroshi Honda (painter) (1910–1970), American painter
- Hiroshi Hori (堀 寛; born 1949), Japanese ice hockey player
- Hiroshi Ibusuki (指宿 洋史; born 1990), Japanese footballer
- Hiroshi Ichihara (市原 大嗣; born 1987), Japanese footballer
- Hiroshi Ikeda (池田 裕; born 1949), Japanese aikido teacher
- Hiroshi Ikehata (池畑 大; born 1970), Japanese male weightlifter
- Hiroshi Ikushima (生島 ヒロシ; born 1950), Japanese announcer and financial planner
- Hiroshi Imai (今井 宏; 1941–2023), Japanese politician
- Hiroshi Imai (engineer) (今井 宏), Japanese Formula One and motorsports engineer
- Hiroshi Imazato (今里 博; 1896–1942), Japanese naval officer
- Hiroshi Imazu (今津 寛; born 1946), Japanese former politician
- Hiroshi Inaba (稲葉 博志; born 1948), Japanese bobsledder
- Hiroshi Inagaki (稲垣 浩; 1905–1980), Japanese film director
- Hiroshi Inomata (猪俣 弘司), Japanese diplomat
- Hiroshi Inose (猪瀬 博; 1927–2000), Japanese electrical engineer
- Hiroshi Inoue (bryologist) (井上 浩; 1932–1989), Japanese botanist
- Hiroshi Inoue (entomologist) (井上 寛; 1917–2008), Japanese lepidopterist
- Hiroshi Inuzuka (犬塚 弘; 1929–2023), Japanese actor, comedian and bassist
- Hiroshi Ishiguro (石黒 浩; born 1963), Japanese roboticist and engineer
- Hiroshi Ishii (computer scientist) (石井 裕; born 1956), Japanese computer scientist and a professor
- Hiroshi Ishii (golfer) (石井 裕士; 1941–2006), Japanese professional golfer
- Hiroshi Ishii (swimmer) (石井 宏; born 1939), Japanese swimmer and Olympic medalist
- Hiroshi Ishikawa (石川 寛; born 1963), Japanese film director and writer
- Hiroshi Isoyama (磯山 博; born 1937), Japanese teacher of the martial art of aikido
- Hiroshi Itagaki (板垣 宏志; born 1945), Japanese ski jumper
- Hiroshi Ito (disambiguation), multiple people
- Hiroshi Ito (糸 博; born 1933), Japanese voice actor
- Hiroshi Itsuki (五木 ひろし; born 1948), Japanese enka singer
- Hiroshi Iuchi (井内 ひろし; born 1967), Japanese director, graphic designer and composer
- Hiroshi Iwasaki (岩崎 ひろし; born 1953), Japanese actor and voice actor
- Hiroshi Iwata (岩田 寛; born 1981), Japanese golfer
- Hiroshi Izawa (伊澤 俊久; born 1955), Japanese actor, voice actor and director
- Hiroshi Izuka (born 1945), Japanese master craftsman of violins and violas
- Hiroshi Izumi (泉 浩; born 1982), Japanese judoka and mixed martial artist
- Hiroshi Jofuku (城福 浩; born 1961), Japanese football manager and former player
- Hiroshi Kado (嘉戸 洋; born 1971), Japanese Greco-Roman wrestler
- Hiroshi Kagawa (賀川 浩; 1924–2024), Japanese football player and journalist
- Hiroshi Kaino (甲斐野 央; born 1996), Japanese professional baseball player
- Hiroshi Kajikawa (梶川 博; born 1949), Japanese former archer
- Hiroshi Kajiwara (梶原 完; 1924–1989), Japanese pianist
- Hiroshi Kajiyama (gymnast) (梶山 広司; born 1953), Japanese former gymnast
- Hiroshi Kajiyama (politician) (梶山 弘志; born 1955), Japanese politician
- Hiroshi Kamayatsu (かまやつ ひろし; 1939–2017), Japanese singer and guitarist
- Hiroshi Kamiya (神谷 浩史; born 1975), Japanese voice actor
- Hiroshi Kamiya (politician) (神谷 裕; born 1968), Japanese politician
- Hiroshi Kamiya (神谷 広志; born 1961), Japanese shogi player
- Hiroshi Kanazawa (金澤 宏; born 1951), Japanese football player
- Hiroshi Kaneda (金田 宏; born 1953), Japanese astronomer
- Hiroshi Kanzawa (born 1953), Japanese meteorologist, environmental scientist and the retired vice dean
- Hiroshi Karube (軽部 弘), Japanese paralympic swimmer
- Hiroshi Kashiwagi (柏木 博; 1922–2019), American poet, playwright and actor
- Hiroshi Kataoka (片岡 宏誌; born 1958), Japanese entomologist and a professor emeritus
- Hiroshi Katayama (片山 洋; born 1940), Japanese former football player
- Hiroshi Katayama (baseball) (片山 博視; born 1987), Japanese professional baseball pitcher
- Hiroshi Kato (加藤 寛; born 1951), Japanese footballer and manager
- Hiroshi Kato (加藤 弘; 1935–2012), Japanese aikidoka
- Hiroshi Katsuno (勝野 洋; born 1949), Japanese actor
- Hiroshi Katsuragawa (桂川 寛; 1924c2011), Japanese artist
- Hiroshi Kawabuchi (川淵 洽馬; 1883–1946), Japanese politician
- Hiroshi Kawagachi (川口 浩; 1936–1987), Japanese actor
- Hiroshi Kawagachi (川口 博史; born 1965), Japanese video game composer
- Hiroshi Kawashima (川島 郭志; born 1970), Japanese boxer
- Hiroshi Kawauchi (川内 博史; born 1961), Japanese politician
- Hiroshi Kazato (風戸 裕; 1949–1974), Japanese racecar driver
- Hiroshi Kichise (吉瀬 広志; born 1983), Japanese former football player
- Hiroshi Kimura (木村 宏; born 1954), Japanese businessman
- Hiroshi Kisanuki (木佐貫 洋; born 1980), Japanese former professional baseball pitcher
- Hiroshi Kitadani (きただに ひろし; born 1968), Japanese singer
- Hiroshi Kiyotake (清武 弘嗣; born 1989), Japanese professional footballer
- Hiroshi Kobayashi (baseball) (小林 宏; born 1970), Japanese retired professional pitcher
- Hiroshi Kobayashi (boxer) (小林 弘; born 1944), Japanese former professional boxer
- Hiroshi Kobayashi (footballer) (小林 寛; born 1959), Japanese former football player and manager
- Hiroshi Kobayashi (shogi, born 1962) (小林 宏; born 1962), Japanese shogi player
- Hiroshi Kobayashi (shogi, born 1976) (小林 裕士; born 1976), Japanese professional shogi player
- Hiroshi Koike (小池 博史; born 1956), Japanese director, playwright and choreographer
- Hiroshi Koizumi (小泉 博; 1926–2015), Japanese actor
- Hiroshi Koizumi (racing driver) (小泉 洋史; born 1969), Japanese racing driver
- Hiroshi Kojima (小島 博; born 1938), Japanese field hockey player
- Hiroshi Kōjina (神志那 弘志; born 1963), Japanese animator, character designer, and anime director
- Hiroshi Komiyama (小宮山 宏; born 1944), Japanese scientist
- Hiroshi Kondoh|, Japanese computer engineer
- Hiroshi Koshiba (小柴 博; 1884–1925), Japanese founder of the Japanese Scouting movement
- Hiroshi Kudo (工藤 博; born 1974), Japanese cross-country skier
- Hiroshi Kume (久米 宏; born 1944), Japanese announcer and television presenter
- Hiroshi Kuroki (黒木 博; 1907–2001), Japanese governor of Miyazaki Prefecture in Japan
- Hiroshi Kuwashima (桑島 博; 1932–2021), Japanese politician
- Hiroshi Kyono (清野 裕司; born 1969), Japanese former vocalist
- Hiroshi Lockheimer (born 1975), Japanese-American software engineer
- Hiroshi Machii (待井 寛; born 1966), Japanese freestyle skier
- Hiroshi Maeda (前田 浩; born 1961), Japanese professional stunt man and suit actor
- Hiroshi Maeda (chemist) (前田 浩; 1938–2021), Japanese pharmacologist and chemist
- Hiroshi Maeue (前上 博; 1968–2009), Japanese serial killer
- Hiroshi Makino (牧野 裕; born 1956), Japanese professional golfer
- Hiroshi Maruyama (丸山 博; born 1949), Japanese diplomat
- Hiroshi Masuda (益田 弘; 1901–????), Japanese track and field athlete
- Hiroshi Masumura (ますむら ひろし; born 1952), Japanese manga artist
- Hiroshi Masuoka (rally driver) (増岡 浩; born 1960), Japanese rally driver
- Hiroshi Masuoka (voice actor) (増岡 弘; 1936–2020), Japanese actor, voice actor and narrator
- Hiroshi Matsuda (松田 浩; born 1960), Japanese manager and former footballer
- Hiroshi Matsumoto (engineer) (松本 紘; 1942–2025), Japanese engineer and atmospheric scientist
- Hiroshi Matsumoto (game designer) (松本 裕司; born 1949), Japanese game designer
- Hiroshi Matsunobu (松延 博; 1915–?), Japanese gymnast
- Hiroshi Matsuura (松浦 浩史; born 1968), Japanese ice hockey player
- Hiroshi Matsuyama (松山 洋; born 1970), Japanese game designer
- Hiroshi Michinaga (道永 宏; born 1956), Japanese archer
- Hiroshi Mikami (三上 博史; born 1962), Japanese actor
- Hiroshi Mikitani (三木谷 浩史; born 1965), President and CEO of Rakuten
- Hiroshi Minagawa (皆川 裕史; born 1970), Japanese video game artist, designer and director
- Hiroshi Minami (actor) (南 廣; 1928–1989), Japanese actor
- Hiroshi Minami (politician) (南 弘; 1869–1946), Japanese bureaucrat, politician and cabinet minister
- Hiroshi Minatoya (湊谷 弘; 1943–2016), Japanese judoka
- Hiroshi Mitome (三留 弘; born 1960), Japanese rower
- Hiroshi Mitsuzuka (三塚 博; 1927–2004), Japanese politician
- Hiroshi Miura (三浦 広司; born 1966), Japanese swimmer
- Hiroshi Miyagahara (宮ヶ原 浩; born 1964), Japanese modern pentathlete
- Hiroshi Miyama (三山 ひろし; born 1980), Japanese enka singer
- Hiroshi Miyamoto (宮本 広志; born 1986), Japanese shogi player
- Hiroshi Miyamura (宮村 浩; 1925–2022), United States Army soldier and Medal of Honor recipient
- Hiroshi Miyauchi (宮内 洋; born 1945), Japanese actor
- Hiroshi Miyazaki (宮崎 博; born 1963), Japanese video game music composer, sound designer and musician
- Hiroshi Miyazawa (宮澤 弘; 1921–2012), Japanese politician
- Hiroshi Miyazawa (footballer) (宮澤 浩; born 1970), Japanese former football player and football manager
- Hiroshi Mizuta (水田 洋; 1919–2023), Japanese economist, historian of social thought and activist
- Hiroshi Mori (astronomer) (森 弘; born 1958), Japanese amateur astronomer
- Hiroshi Mori (writer) (森 博嗣; born 1957), Japanese writer and engineer
- Hiroshi Morie (森江 博; 1968–2023), better known as Heath, Japanese musician
- Hiroshi Morioka (守岡 博), Japanese anime director and artist
- Hiroshi Morita (森田 浩史; born 1978), Japanese former football player
- Hiroshi Moriwaki (森脇 浩司; born 1960), Japanese former Nippon Professional Baseball player and current coach
- Hiroshi Moriya (森屋 宏; born 1957), Japanese politician
- Hiroshi Moriyama (森山 裕; born 1945), Japanese politician
- Hiroshi Moriyasu (森保 洋; born 1972), Japanese footballer
- Hiroshi Motomiya (本宮 ひろ志; born 1947), Japanese manga artist
- Hiroshi Motomura (born 1953), Japanese Professor of Law
- Hiroshi Motoyama (本山 博; 1925–2015), Japanese parapsychologist, spiritual instructor and author
- Hiroshi Murakami (村上 寛; born 1948), Japanese jazz drummer
- Hiroshi Murayama (村山 浩; born 1974), Japanese para badminton player
- Hiroshi Nagahama (長濱 博史; born 1970), Japanese animator and director
- Hiroshi Nagai (永井 博; born 1947), Japanese graphic designer and illustrator
- Hiroshi Nagakubo (長久 保裕; born 1946), Japanese former figure skating coach and pair skater
- Hiroshi Nagano (長野 博; born 1972) Japanese singer, a member of boy band V6
- Hiroshi Naganuma (長沼 洋; born 1965) Japanese shogi player
- Hiroshi Nagao (長尾 浩志; born 1979), Japanese retired professional wrestler
- Hiroshi Nagashima (長島 浩; born 1966), Japanese boxer
- Hiroshi Nagata (永田 寛; 1907–1961), Japanese field hockey player
- Hiroshi Naito (内藤 廣; born 1950), Japanese architect
- Hiroshi Naka (中 博史; born 1960), Japanese actor, voice actor and narrator
- Hiroshi Nakada (中田 宏; born 1964), Mayor of Yokohama City, Kanagawa Prefecture, Japan
- Hiroshi Nakai (中井 洽; 1942–2017), Japanese politician
- Hiroshi Nakajima (中嶋 宏; 1928–2013), Japanese doctor
- Hiroshi Nakajima (fencer) (中嶋 寛; born 1943), Japanese fencer
- Hiroshi Nakamoto (中本 浩; born 1966), Japanese baseball player
- Hiroshi Nakamura (architect) (中村 拓志; born 1974), Japanese architect
- Hiroshi Nakamura (artist) (中村 宏; 1932–2026), Japanese artist
- Hiroshi Nakamura (biochemist) (中村 拓; 1890–1974), Japanese biochemist
- Hiroshi Nakamura (dissident) (中村 泰; 1930–2024), Japanese dissident
- Hiroshi Nakamura (fighter) (中村 浩士; born 1981), Japanese mixed martial artist
- Hiroshi Nakamura (judoka) (born 1942), Japanese and Canadian judoka
- Hiroshi Nakano (footballer) (中野 洋司; born 1983), Japanese former footballer
- Hiroshi Nakano (rower) (中野 紘志; born 1987), Japanese rower
- Hiroshi Nakatsuka (中司 宏; born 1956), Japanese politician
- Hiroshi Nanami (名波 浩; born 1972), Japanese football player
- Hiroshi Narahara (奈良原 浩; born 1968), Japanese baseball player
- Hiroshi Negami (根上 博; 1912–1980), Japanese swimmer
- Hiroshi Nemoto (根本 博; 1891–1966), Japanese lieutenant general
- Hiroshi Neko (猫 ひろし; born 1977), Japanese comedian
- Hiroshi Ninomiya (二宮 寛; born 1937), Japanese former football player and manager
- Hiroshi Ninomiya (footballer, born 1969) (二宮 浩; born 1969), Japanese manager and former footballer
- Hiroshi Nishihara (西原 寛; born 1955), Japanese chemist and Professor of Chemistry
- Hiroshi Nishikiori (錦織 博; born 1966), Japanese director
- Hiroshi Nishio (西尾 孔志; born 1974), Japanese film director, animator, and writer
- Hiroshi Nishitani (西谷 弘; born 1962), Japanese film director
- Hiroshi Noguchi (野口 裕司; born 1972), Japanese former football player
- Hiroshi Nohara (野原 弘司; born 1967), Japanese traveler
- Hiroshi Noma (野間 宏; 1915–1991), Japanese poet, novelist and essayist
- Hiroshi Nosaka (野坂 浩; 1914–2004), Japanese gymnast
- Hiroshi Nozaki (1926–2006), Japanese Shiatsu master and alternative healer
- Hiroshi Ochiai (落合 弘; born 1946), Japanese former football player
- Hiroshi Ogawa (animator) (小川 博司; 1951–2013), Japanese animator
- Hiroshi Ogawa (cross-country skier) (小川 弘; born 1944), Japanese cross-country skier
- Hiroshi Ogawa (pitcher) (小川 博; born 1962), Japanese baseball player and convicted murderer
- Hiroshi Ogawa (politician) (小川 洋; 1949–2021), Japanese politician
- Hiroshi Ogawa (second baseman) (小川 博; born 1940), Japanese former Nippon Professional Baseball shortstop
- Hiroshi Ogawa (shortstop) (小川 史; born 1960), Japanese former Nippon Professional Baseball shortstop
- Hiroshi Oguchi (大口 広司; 1950–2009), Japanese conceptual artist, musician and scene maker
- Hiroshi Ohashi (大橋 浩司; born 1959), Japanese former football player and manager
- Hiroshi Ohchi (大智 浩; 1908–1974), Japanese graphic designer
- Hiroshi Ohno (大野 博司; born 1958), Japanese immunologist and microbiologist
- Hiroshi Ohshita (大下 弘; 1922–1979), Japanese Baseball Hall of Fame outfielder
- Hiroshi Okachi (born 1955), Japanese bobsledder
- Hiroshi Okada (岡田 広; born 1947), Japanese politician
- Hiroshi Okamoto (岡本 寛志; born 1977), Japanese voice actor
- Hiroshi Okamura (岡村 博; 1905–1948), Japanese mathematician
- Hiroshi Okazaki (岡崎 洋; born 1967), Japanese shogi player
- Hiroshi Okuda (奥田 碩; born 1932), Japanese businessman
- Hiroshi Okuyama (奥山 大史; born 1996), Japanese film director
- Hiroshi Omori (大森 博; born 2002), Japanese footballer
- Hiroshi Ōnishi (大西 博; 1961–2011), Japanese painter and university professor
- Hiroshi Ono (artist) (小野 浩; 1957–2021), Japanese video game artist
- Hiroshi Ono (photographer) (小野 博; born 1971), Japanese photographer
- Hiroshi Ono (scholar) (小野 寛; born 1934), Japanese literary scholar
- Hiroshi Ono (weightlifter) (小野 浩; born 1950), Japanese weightlifter
- Hiroshi Ōnogi (大野木 寛; born 1959), Japanese screenwriter and novelist
- Hirosi Ooguri (大栗 博司; born 1962), Japanese theoretical physicist
- Hiroshi Osada (長田 弘; 1939–2015), Japanese poet and author
- Hiroshi Ōsaka (逢坂 浩司; 1963–2007), Japanese animator, character designer and illustrator
- Hiroshi Ōshima (大島 浩; 1886–1975), Japanese general and diplomat
- Hiroshi Ota (太田 博; born 1936), Japanese diplomat
- Hiroshi Ōtake (大竹 宏; 1932–2022), Japanese voice actor
- Hiroshi Otsuki (大槻 紘士; born 1980), Japanese former football player and manager
- Hiroshi Saeki (佐伯 博司; born 1936), Japanese former football player
- Hiroshi Saito (basketball) (斎藤 博; 1933–2011), Japanese basketball player
- Hiroshi Saito (斎藤 博; 1886–1939), Japanese diplomat
- Hiroshi Saito (斉藤 浩史; born 1970), Japanese footballer
- Hiroshi Saito (斎藤 裕; 1947–2010), Japanese mathematician
- Hiroshi Saito (才藤 浩; born 1961), Japanese pentathlete
- Hiroshi Saito (斎藤 宏; born 1937), Japanese rower
- Hiroshi Saitō (governor) (斎藤 弘; born 1957), Japanese politician from Yamagata, Yamagata Prefecture
- Hiroshi Saitō (mayor) (斉藤 博; born 1939), Japanese politician from Tokorozawa, Saitama Prefecture
- Hiroshi Sakagami (坂上 弘; 1936–2021), Japanese author
- Hiroshi Sakaguchi, Japanese carpenter
- Hiroshi Sakai (坂井 浩; born 1976), Japanese former football player
- Hiroshi Sakamoto (坂本 弘; born 1960), Japanese swimmer
- Hiroshi Sakurazaka (桜坂 洋; born 1970), Japanese author
- Hiroshi Sambuichi (三分一 博志; born 1968), Japanese architect
- Hiroshi Sasagawa (笹川 ひろし; born 1936), Japanese director of several anime and manga series
- Hiroshi Sasano (笹野 浩志; born 1978), Japanese middle-distance runner
- Hiroshi Sato (curler) (佐藤 浩; born 1978), Japanese curler and curling coach
- Hiroshi Sato (musician) (佐藤 博; 1947–2012), Japanese singer-songwriter
- Hiroshi Sekiguchi (関口 宏; born 1943), Japanese actor, tarento, television presenter, newscaster, businessman and manager
- Hiroshi Sekita (関田 寛士; born 1989), Japanese football former player
- Hiroshi Seko (瀬古浩司; born 1981), Japanese screenwriter
- Hiroshi Senju (千住 博; born 1958), Japanese Nihonga painter
- Hiroshi Shibahara (柴原 洋; born 1974), Japanese professional baseball player
- Hiroshi Shibata (柴田 宏; born 1935), Japanese sprinter and triple jumper
- Hiroshi Shibutani (渋谷 浩; born 1967), Japanese table tennis player
- Hiroshi Shiibashi (椎橋 寛; born 1980), Japanese manga artist
- Hiroshi Shima (島 比呂志; 1918–2003), pen name of Kaoru Kishiue, Japanese writer
- Hiroshi Shimizu (director) (清水 宏; 1903–1966), Japanese film director
- Hiroshi Shimizu (professor) (清水 洋; born 1973), Japanese management scholar
- Hiroshi Shimomura (下村 宏; 1875–1957), Japanese official
- Hiroshi Shintani (新谷 博; born 1964), Japanese former professional baseball player
- Hiroshi Shiono (塩野 宏; 1931–2026), Japanese legal scholar
- Hiroshi Shirai (白井 寛; 1937–2024), Japanese master of Shotokan karate
- Hiroshi Shirokuma (白熊 寛嗣; born 1979), Japanese voice actor
- Hiroshi Shō (尚 裕; 1918–1997), Japanese head of the Shō family, the former Ryūkyūan royal family
- Hiroshi Soejima (副島 博志; born 1959), Japanese former football player and manager
- Hiroshi Sowa (楚輪 博; born 1956), Japanese former football player and manager
- Hiroshi Suga (管 洋志; 1945–2013), Japanese photographer
- Hiroshi Sugawara (菅原 浩志; 1955–2025), Japanese film director, producer and screenwriter
- Hiroshi Sugimoto (杉本 博司; born 1948), Japanese photographer and architect
- Hiroshi Sugito (杉戸 洋; born 1970), Japanese contemporary painter
- Hiroshi Suura (1925–1998), Japanese theoretical physicist
- Hiroshi Suzuki (baseball) (鈴木 博志; born 1997), Japanese professional baseball player
- Hiroshi Suzuki (bobsledder) (鈴木 寛; born 1973), Japanese bobsledder
- Hiroshi Suzuki (diplomat) (鈴木 浩; born 1961), Japanese diplomat
- Hiroshi Suzuki (silversmith) (born 1961), Japanese-born silversmith
- Hiroshi Suzuki (swimmer) (鈴木 弘; born 1933), Japanese retired freestyle swimmer
- Hiroshi Suzuki (trombonist) (鈴木 弘; 1933–2020), Japanese American jazz trombonist and musical artist
- Hiroshi Tachi (舘 ひろし; born 1950), Japanese actor
- Hiroshi Tada (多田 宏; born 1929), Japanese aikido teacher
- Hiroshi Tada (engineer) (1939–2021), Japanese mechanical engineer
- Hiroshi Tadano (但野 寛; 1914–1986), Japanese alpine and cross-country skier
- Hiroshi Takahashi (architect) (高橋 ヒロシ; born 1953), Japanese architect
- Hiroshi Takahashi (artist) (高橋 ヒロシ; born 1965), Japanese manga artist
- Hiroshi Takahashi (table tennis) (高橋 浩), Japanese table tennis player
- Hiroshi Takamura (髙村 祐; born 1969), Japanese former Nippon Professional Baseball pitcher, pitching coach
- Hiroshi Takano (高野 寛; born 1964), Japanese singer, composer, lyricist, music arranger, guitarist and producer
- Hiroshi Takashige (たかしげ 宙), Japanese manga writer
- Hiroshi Takemura (竹村 拓; born 1953), Japanese voice actor
- Hiroshi Takeshima (竹島 宏; born 1978), Japanese enka singer
- Hiroshi Takeya, a professor and physician in Japan
- Hiroshi Tamaki (玉置 宏; born 1980), Japanese television presenter
- Hiroshi Tamaki (玉木 宏; born 1980), Japanese actor
- Hiroshi Tamiya (田宮 博; 1903–1984), Japanese plant biochemist and microbiologist
- Hiroshi Tanahashi (棚橋 弘至; born 1976), Japanese professional wrestler
- Hiroshi Tanaka (athlete) (田中 弘; 1915–?), Japanese high jumper
- Hiroshi Tanaka (田中 衆史; born 1972), Japanese figure skater and coach
- Hiroshi Teshigahara (勅使河原 宏; 1927–2001), Japanese filmmaker
- Hiroshi Tetsuto (鐡戸 裕史; born 1982), Japanese football player
- Hiroshi Toda (戸田 宏; 1928–2026), Japanese mathematician
- Hiroshi Tomihari (富張 広司; born 1936), Japanese artist
- Hiroshi Toriba (鳥羽 博司; born 1950), Japanese rower
- Hiroshi Toyooka (豊岡 弘; born 1969), Japanese former cyclist
- Hiroshi Tsubaki (椿 大志; born 1991), Japanese former professional cyclist
- Hiroshi Tsuburaya (円谷 浩; 1964–2001), Japanese actor
- Hiroshi Tsuchida (土田 大; born 1972), Japanese actor
- Hiroshi Tsukamoto (塚本 洋; born 1975), Japanese conditioning coach
- Hiroshi Tsuno (津野 浩; born 1965), Japanese retired professional baseball pitcher
- Hiroshi Tsuruya (塚本 洋; born 1970), Japanese mixed martial artist
- Hiroshi Udagawa (宇田川 洋; born 1944), Japanese archaeologist and anthropologist
- Hiroshi Umemura (fighter) (born 1972), Japanese mixed martial artist
- Hiroshi Umemura (mathematician) (梅村 浩; 1944–2019), Japanese mathematician
- Hiroshi Urano (浦野 博司; born 1989), Japanese former professional baseball pitcher
- Hiroshi Wajima (輪島 大士; 1948–2018), former Yokozuna in sumo
- Hiroshi Wakasugi (若杉 弘; 1935–2009), Japanese orchestra conductor
- Hiroshi Watanabe (animator) (わたなべ ひろし), Japanese animator, storyboard artist and director
- Hiroshi Watanabe (equestrian) (渡辺 弘; born 1947), Japanese equestrian
- Hiroshi Watanabe (photographer) (渡邉 博史; born 1951), Japanese photographer
- Hiroshi Watanabe (weightlifter) (渡辺 博; born 1967), Japanese weightlifter
- Hiroshi Watari (渡 洋史; born 1963), Japanese singer, voice actor, and actor
- Hiroshi Yagi (八木 裕; born 1965), Japanese retired baseball player
- Hiroshi Yamada (山田 宏; born 1958), Japanese politician
- Baron Yamakawa Hiroshi (山川 浩; 1845–1898), samurai, politician and educator
- Hiroshi Yamamoto (archer) (山本 博; born 1962), Japanese archer
- Hiroshi Yamamoto (politician) (山本 博司; born 1954), Japanese politician
- Hiroshi Yamamoto (shogi) (山本 博志; born 1996), Japanese professional shogi player
- Hiroshi Yamamoto (sprinter) (山本 弘一; 1928–1990/1991), Japanese sprinter
- Hiroshi Yamamura (山村 浩; born 1962), Japanese naval officer
- Hiroshi V. Yamamura (born 1972), Marshallese politician and government minister
- Hiroshi Yamao (山尾 裕; born 1943), Japanese cyclist
- Hiroshi Yamashiro (山城 宏; born 1958), Japanese professional Go player
- Hiroshi Yamashita (山下 裕史; born 1986), Japanese rugby union player
- Hiroshi Yamato (大和 ヒロシ; born 1983), Japanese professional wrestler
- Hiroshi Yamauchi (山内 溥; 1927–2013), former president of Nintendo
- Hiroshi Yamazaki (山崎 博; 1946–2017), Japanese photographer
- Hiroshi Yamazaki (山崎 弘; born 1937), Japanese weightlifter
- Hiroshi Yanai (handballer) (born 1960), Japanese former handball player
- Hiroshi Yanai (publisher) (矢内 廣; born 1950), Japanese businessperson
- Hiroshi Yanaka (家中 宏; born 1958), Japanese voice actor
- Hiroshi Yasuda (安田 浩; born 1944), Japanese Professor
- Hiroshi Yoneyama (米山 弘; 1908–1988), Japanese swimmer
- Hiroshi Yoshida (吉田 博; 1876–1950), Japanese painter and woodblock printmaker
- Hiroshi Yoshida (footballer) (吉田 弘; born 1958), Japanese former football player and manager
- Hiroshi Yoshida (wushu), Japanese former wushu taolu athlete
- Hiroshi Yoshikawa (吉川 洋; born 1951), Japanese economist
- Hiroshi Yoshimura (吉村弘; 1940–2003), Japanese musician and composer
- Hiroshi Yoshinaga (吉永 大志; born 1996), Japanese footballer
- Hiroshi Yoshino (吉野 弘; 1926–2014), Japanese poet
- Hiroshi Yoshizawa (吉沢 広司; 1931–2013), Japanese ski jumper
- Hiroshi Yuki (結城 浩; born 1963), Japanese author (of books such as Math Girls) and computer programmer

== People with the surname ==
- Justin Hirosi, Palauan triple murderer and rapist
- Sandro Hiroshi, Japanese-Brazilian footballer

== Fictional characters ==
- Hiroshi (Gaeru), the protagonist of Dokonjō Gaeru
- Hiroshi (Pokémon), known in English as Ritchie, a character in the Pokémon anime
- Hiroshi (Ranma), a character in Ranma ½, one of Ranma's two friends, the other being Daisuke
- Hiroshi (Sesame Street), an aspiring artist on Sesame Street played by Gedde Watanabe in the late 1980s/Early 1990s
- Hiroshi, the main protagonist of the survival horror game Ao Oni
- Hiroshi, a character in Durarara!
- Hiroshi Abe, a character in Shonan Junai Gumi
- Hiroshi Agasa (Herschel Agasa in the English anime), in Case Closed: Detective Conan
- Hiroshi Akiba, a character from the manga Inubaka
- Hiroshi Fukuda, a character in Kuroko no Basuke
- Hiroshi Fumihiro, from Initial D
- Hiroshi Hayashi, a character in Yakuza
- Hiroshi Hirai, a character in Denshi Sentai Denziman
- Hiroshi Hoshizora, a character from the anime Smile PreCure!
- Hiroshi Ichikawa, a character from Wild Strikers
- Hiroshi Ichikawa, a character in the Manga and anime Kaibutsu-kun
- Hiroshi Kochatani, a character in Great Teacher Onizuka
- Hiroshi Kubo, a character from the novel Shiosai
- Hiroshi Kuronaga, Boy #9 in Battle Royale
- Hiroshi Matsumoto, a character in Miss Machiko
- Hiroshi Morenos, a character from the anime Michiko & Hatchin
- Hiroshi Mochizuki, a character in Kamen Rider ZO
- Hiroshi Nakano, a character in the Manga and anime Gravitation
- Hiroshi Nitta, a character in Denjin Zaborger
- Hiroshi Nohara, the father of the protagonist, Shinnosuke Nohara, in Crayon Shin-chan
- Hiroshi Sakura, the father of the protagonist, Momoko Maruko, in Chibi Maruko-chan
- Hiroshi Sato, Superior businessman, Equalist sympathizer, and father to Asami Sato in The Legend of Korra
- Hiroshi Tennouji, the main villain in Kamen Rider Blade
- Hiroshi Uchiyamada, a character in Great Teacher Onizuka
- Hiroshi Udagawa, a fictional businessman in the Australian soap opera Neighbours
- Hiroshi Yushima, a character in Digimon Savers
