= Hiroshi Ogawa =

Hiroshi Ogawa may refer to:

- Hiroshi Ogawa (second baseman) (小川 博, born 1940), former Japanese professional player
- Hiroshi Ogawa (shortstop) (小川 史, born 1960), former Japanese professional player
- Hiroshi Ogawa (pitcher) (小川 博, born 1962), Japanese baseball player and convicted criminal
- Hiroshi Ogawa (politician) (小川 洋, 1949 – 2021), Japanese governor of Fukuoka Prefecture
- Hiroshi Ogawa (animator) (小川 博司, 1950 or 1951 – 2013), Japanese animator
- Hiroshi Ogawa (cross-country skier) (小川 弘, born 1944), Japanese Olympic skier
