= List of Nippon Professional Baseball players (O) =

The following is a list of Nippon Professional Baseball players with the last name starting with O, retired or active.

== O ==
- Thomas O'Malley
- Shota Oba
- Takao Obana
- Sherman Obando
- Koji Obata
- Wes Obermueller
- Keiji Obiki
- Wirfin Obispo
- Daisuke Ochi
- Eiji Ochiai
- Hiromitsu Ochiai
- Alex Ochoa
- Kohei Oda
- Tomoyuki Oda
- Masakuni Odajima
- Michihiro Ogasawara
- Takashi Ogasawara
- Koichi Ogata
- Koichi Ogata
- Yoshinori Ogata
- Hirofumi Ogawa
- Hiroshi Ogawa (pitcher)
- Hiroshi Ogawa (shortstop)
- Hiroshi Ogawa (second baseman)
- Koichi Ogawa
- Masatoshi Ogawa
- Yoshiharu Ogawa
- Yusuke Ogawa
- Tadahiro Ogino
- Ben Oglivie
- Hisashi Ogura
- Shinsuke Ogura
- Sadaharu Oh
- Heishu Ohara
- Masanori Ohashi
- Toyokazu Ohba
- Yasufumi Ohgai
- Akira Ohgi
- Seiichi Ohira
- Shoji Ohiro
- Daijiro Ohishi
- Masayoshi Ohishi
- Tomokazu Ohka
- Motoi Ohkoshi
- Hideaki Ohkubo
- Hiromoto Ohkubo
- Masanobu Ohkubo
- Kevin Ohme
- Noriyoshi Ohmichi
- Yuta Ohmine
- Takeshi Ohmori
- Iwao Ohmura
- Naoyuki Ohmura
- Saburo Ohmura
- Hiroaki Ohnishi
- Masaki Ohnishi
- Takayuki Ohnishi
- Hisashi Ohno
- Kazuya Ohno
- Rin Ohno
- Ryuji Ohno
- Takahiro Ohno
- Yuji Ohno
- Yutaka Ohno
- Ryosuke Ohnuki
- Koji Ohnuma
- Hiromi Oho
- Yutaro Ohsaki
- Keiji Ohsawa
- Hiroyuki Oshima
- Takayuki Oshima
- Yasunori Ohshima
- Yutaka Ohshima
- Yuji Ohshiro
- Hiroshi Ohshita
- Makoto Ohsuga
- Atori Ohta
- Atsushi Ohta
- Satoru Ohta
- Takashi Ohta
- Ryuta Ohtahara
- Kan Ohtake
- Ryuji Ohtani
- Susumu Ohtomo
- Kenji Ohtonari
- Akinori Ohtsuka
- Akira Ohtsuka
- Jun Ohtsuka
- Koji Ohtsuka
- Yoshiki Ohtsuka
- Koji Ohwaki
- Akihiko Ohya
- Takahiro Ohyama
- Alvis Ojeda
- Yoichi Okabayashi
- Akinobu Okada
- Hirokazu Okada
- Takahiro Okada
- Kazunori Okagami
- Hideki Okajima
- Akira Okamoto
- Atsushi Okamoto
- Hidehiro Okamoto
- Isami Okamoto
- Katsunori Okamoto
- Koji Okamoto
- Naoya Okamoto
- Shinya Okamoto
- Tetsuji Okamoto
- Toru Okamoto
- Kaoru Okazaki
- Taichi Okazaki
- Yoshinori Okihara
- Takehiro Okumura
- Curtis Olsen
- Shoitsu Omatsu
- Yuji Onizaki
- Goh Ono
- Hitoshi Ono
- Kazuyoshi Ono
- Kazuyuki Ono
- Kosei Ono
- Shingo Ono
- Chikara Onodera
- Hirokatsu Oohata
- Rafael Orellano
- Junya Orita
- José Ortiz
- Luis Ortiz
- Ramón Ortiz
- Shuichiro Osada
- Katsuhito Osaka
- Takehiko Oshimoto
- Kenichi Oshio
- Koichi Oshima
- Shigeki Oto
- Chris Oxspring
- Kouya Oyafuso
- Keiji Oyama
- Tsutomu Oyama
- Takao Oyamada
- Yasuhiro Oyamada
- Masaya Ozaki
- Hiroyuki Oze
- Tatsuya Ozeki
