= Hiroshi Ono =

Hiroshi Ono can refer to:

- Hiroshi Ono (photographer) (born 1971), Japanese photographer
- Hiroshi Ono (scholar) (born 1934), Japanese scholar
- Hiroshi Ono (weightlifter) (born 1950), Japanese Olympic weightlifter
- Hiroshi Ono (artist) (1957–2021), Japanese video game artist
