= Onishi =

Onishi (大西), other romanizations include Ōnishi, Oonishi, and Ohnishi with long vowel ō, is a Japanese surname or a Japanese place name. Onishi (尾西) with short vowel o, is a Japanese surname. Onishi (鬼石) with short vowel o, is a Japanese place name.

It may refer to:

== With long vowel ō ==
=== People ===
- Aijiro Onishi (大西 愛治郎, 1881–1958), Japanese religious leader
- Hiroshi Ōnishi (大西 博, 1961–2011), Japanese painter and University professor
- Junko Onishi (musician) (大西 順子, born 1967), Japanese post-bop jazz pianist
- Junko Onishi (swimmer) (大西 順子, born 1974), swimmer from Japan, won a bronze medal at the 2000 Summer Olympics
- Koji Onishi (大西 孝治, born 1988), Japanese footballer
- Kazumi Onishi (大西 一美, born 1948), Japanese figure skater
- Masayuki Onishi (大西 昌之, born 1977) Japanese football player
- Mitsugu Ōnishi (大西みつぐ, born 1952), Japanese photographer
- Nanami Onishi| (大西七海), Japanese skateboarder
- Norimitsu Onishi (大西 哲光), Canadian journalist
- Tadao Onishi (大西 忠生, 1943–2006) Japanese football player
- Takashi Onishi (大西 貴, born 1971), Japanese football player
- Takijirō Ōnishi (大西 瀧治郎, 1891–1945), admiral in the Imperial Japanese Navy, known as the father of the kamikaze
- Takuya Onishi (大西 卓哉, born 1975), Japanese astronaut
- Tama Onishi (大西 玉, 1916–1969), Japanese religious leader
- Onishi Tetsunosuke (大西鐡之祐) 1916–1995), professor and coach of the Japan national rugby union team
- Yohei Onishi (大西 容平, born 1982), Japanese football player
- Yoshiaki Onishi (大西 義明, born 1981) composer, conductor, and clarinetist
- Yoshihiro Onishi (大西 恵弘; 1941–2003), Japanese rower
- Yuka Onishi (大西結花, born 1968) Japanese actress and idol singer, known for her role in the TV series Sukeban Deka III
- Yuki Onishi (大西 勇輝; born 1996), Japanese footballer
- Yuki Onishi (chef)
- Ai Haruna (born 1972 as Kenji Ōnishi (大西 賢示)), Japanese transsexual TV personality and singer

=== Places ===
- Ōnishi, Ehime (大西町), Japan
- Ōnishi Station (大西駅), a railway station in Imabari, Japan

=== Other uses ===
- 9062 Ohnishi, asteroid

== With short vowel o ==
=== People ===
- Misaki Onishi (尾西 美咲; born 1985)

=== Places ===
- Onishi, Gunma (鬼石町), Japan
