= List of Japanese diplomats =

This article is a list of diplomats of Japan.

- Yasushi Akashi (1931-)
- Ken Harada (?-1973)
- Hasekura Tsunenaga (1571-1622)
- Inagaki Manjirō (1861-1908)
- Hiroshi Inomata
- Komura Jutarō (1855-1911)
- Katsuhiko Oku (1958-2003)
- Motono Ichirō (1862-1918)
- Kenzo Oshima (1943–2021)
- Setsuzō Sawada (1884-1976)
- Chiune Sugihara (1900-1986)
- Tatsuo Kawai (1889-1965)
- Kiyoshi Uchiyama
- Tokugawa Iesato (1863-1940)
- Tokugawa Iemasa (1884 – 1963)
