= Inomata =

Inomata (written: 猪又, 猪俣 or 猪股) is a Japanese surname. Notable people with the surname include:

- Hiroshi Inomata (猪俣 弘司), Japanese diplomat
- Kimihiro Inomata (猪俣公宏; 1944-2021), Japanese professor in Sports Science, Emeritus Chukyo University
- Mutsumi Inomata (猪股 むつみ; born 1960), Japanese illustrator and animator
- Takeshi Inomata, Japanese jazz drummer and bandleader
- Yumi Inomata (猪又 由美; born 1968), Japanese cross-country skier

== Fictional characters ==
- Maria Inomata (猪又 まりあ), a supporting character in School Babysitters
- Taiki Inomata (猪股 大喜), the main protagonist of Blue Box
