= Takeya =

- Gender: Male

Origin
- Origin: Japanese
- Meaning: Different meanings depending on the kanji used

Takeya (written: 偉弥, 剛也) is a masculine Japanese given name. Notable people with the name include:

- Asasegawa Takeya (淺瀬川 剛也) (born 1942), Japanese sumo wrestler
- Takeya Mizugaki (水垣 偉弥) (born 1983), Japanese mixed martial artist
- Takeya Nakamura (中村 剛也) (born 1983), Japanese baseball player

Takeya (written: 竹谷, 竹屋 or 武谷) is also a Japanese surname. Notable people with the surname include:

- Takeya Hiroshi (武谷 廣), Japanese physician
- Makoto Takeya (born 1977), Japanese footballer
- Mikiko Takeya (竹屋 美紀子) (born 1980), Japanese sprint canoeist
- Toshiko Takeya (竹谷 とし子) (born 1969), Japanese politician
