= Hiketabe no Akaiko =

Hiketabe no Akaiko (引田部赤猪子; dates unknown) is a figure appearing in the Kojiki, an eighth-century Japanese chronicle.

== Life ==
Akaiko appears as the principal character in a legend of Emperor Yūryaku's reign recounted in the Kojiki. Emperor Yūryaku is considered a legendary emperor, who is supposed to have reigned during the late 5th century C.E. This would place his reign during the Kofun period of Japanese history.

Akaiko is described in the Kojiki as a member of the Hiketabe clan (引田部). In her youth, she was noticed by Emperor Yūryaku by the Miwa River (三輪川Miwa-gawa) in Yamato Province. After this, she remained a virgin as she waited eighty years for the emperor to take her as a lover.

According to the Kojiki's account, as an old woman she met again with the emperor, and had a poetic exchange with him. These comprise four of the so-called shitsu-uta (志都歌, also read shizu-uta).

== Cited works ==
- Kanai, Seiichi (1986). "Akaiko". In Inukai, Kiyoshi; Inoue, Muneo; Ōkubo, Tadashi; Ono, Hiroshi; Tanaka, Yutaka; Hashimoto, Fumio; Fujihira, Haruo (eds.). Waka Daijiten (in Japanese). Tokyo: Meiji Shoin. p. 2. ISBN 4-625-40029-5.
- Toya, Takaaki (1986). "Shizu-uta (Shitsu-uta)". In Inukai, Kiyoshi; Inoue, Muneo; Ōkubo, Tadashi; Ono, Hiroshi; Tanaka, Yutaka; Hashimoto, Fumio; Fujihira, Haruo (eds.). Waka Daijiten (in Japanese). Tokyo: Meiji Shoin. p. 2. ISBN 4-625-40029-5.
