= Hiroshi Ohno =

Japanese Immunology researcher

- Born: October 27, 1958 (age 67); Tokyo
- Education: Chiba University (MD); Chiba University (PhD)
- Awards: Ando Momofuku Prize(2015); Beltz award(2016); Minister of Education, Culture, Sports, Science and Technology Commendation for Science and Technology Award(2018); Mochida Memorial Academic Award(2021); Takamine Memorial Daiichi Sankyo Award(2022); Uehara Prize(2022); Medals of Honor (Japan) (with purple ribbon)(2023)
- Scientific career
- Fields: Immunology
- Workplaces: RIKEN Center for Integrative Medical Sciences; Yokohama City University Graduate School of Medicine; Chiba University Graduate School of Medicine

Hiroshi Ohno (Japanese: 大野 博司 Hiroshi Ohno; born October 27, 1958) is a Japanese immunologist and microbiologist. He is a Deputy Director of the RIKEN Center for Integrative Medical Sciences and the Team Leader of Laboratory for Intestinal Ecosystem. Also is a visiting professor at the Immunobiology Laboratory at Yokohama City University Graduate School of Educal Life Science; and a visiting professor at Chiba University Graduate School of Medicine.

He obtained his Ph.D. from the Chiba University in 1991. In 2023 he was awarded the Medals of Honor (Japan)(with purple ribbon) for his contributions to immunology and gut microbiota research.

== Biography ==
- 1983 - M.D. from the Chiba University, and worked as a anesthesiologist
- 1984 - Anesthesiologist at Tokyo Employees' Pension Hospital(currently JCHO Tokyo Shinjuku Medical Center)
- 1985 - Anesthesiologist at National Health Insurance Matsudo City Hospital (currently Matsudo City General Medical Center)
- 1986 - Anesthesiologist at Chiba Cancer Center
- 1987 - Researcher at Faculty of Pharmaceutical Sciences, Kyoto University
- 1988 - Researcher of immunology at Chiba University
- 1991 - PhD from the Chiba University
- 1991 - Visiting researcher at Institute of Genetics at the University of Cologne
- 1991 - Assistant researcher at Chiba University
- 1993 - Visiting researcher at National Institutes of Health (NIH)
- 1997 - Assistant professor at Chiba University
- 1999 - Full professor at Kanazawa University
- 2004 - Team leader of the Laboratoy for Epithelial Immunobiology in RIKEN Research Center for Allergy and Immunology
- 2005 - Visiting professor at the Yokohama City University Graduate School of Medical Life Science（concurrent position）
- 2007 - Visiting professor at Chiba University Graduate School of Medicine（concurrent position）
- 2022 - Deputy Director of the RIKEN Center for Integrative Medical Sciences and Team Leader of the Laboratory for Intestinal Ecosystem

== Awards and prizes ==
- 2015 - Ando Momofuku Prize
- 2016 - Beltz award(2nd)
- 2018 - Minister of Education, Culture, Sports, Science and Technology Commendation for Science and Technology Award
- 2018 - Hideyo Noguchi Memorial Medical Prize
- 2021 - Mochida Memorial Academic Award
- 2022 - Takamine Memorial Daiichi Sankyo Award
- 2022 - Uehara Prize
- 2023 - Medals of Honor (Japan)(with purple ribbon)

== Notable publications ==
- Takeuchi, Tadashi; Miyauchi, Eiji; Kanaya, Takashi; Kato, Tamotsu; Nakanishi, Yumiko; Watanabe, Takashi; Kitami, Toshimori; Taida, Takashi; Sasaki, Takaharu; Negishi, Hiroki; Shimamoto, Shu; Matsuyama, Akinobu; Kimura, Ikuo; Williams, Ifor R.; Ohara, Osamu; Ohno, Hiroshi (2021). "Acetate differentially regulates IgA reactivity to commensal bacteria". Nature. 595 (7868): 560–564. Bibcode:2021Natur.595..560T. doi:10.1038/s41586-021-03727-5. PMID 34262176.
- Miyauchi, Eiji; Kim, Seok-Won; Suda, Wataru; Kawasumi, Masami; Onawa, Satoshi; Taguchi-Atarashi, Naoko; Morita, Hidetoshi; Taylor, Todd D.; Hattori, Masahira; Ohno, Hiroshi (2020). "Gut microorganisms act together to exacerbate inflammation in spinal cords". Nature. 585 (7823): 102–106. Bibcode:2020Natur.585..102M. doi:10.1038/s41586-020-2634-9. PMID 32848245.
- Takeuchi, Tadashi; Kubota, Tetsuya; Nakanishi, Yumiko; Tsugawa, Hiroshi; Suda, Wataru; Kwon, Andrew Tae-Jun; Yazaki, Junshi; Ikeda, Kazutaka; Nemoto, Shino; Mochizuki, Yoshiki; Kitami, Toshimori; Yugi, Katsuyuki; Mizuno, Yoshiko; Yamamichi, Nobutake; Yamazaki, Tsutomu; Takamoto, Iseki; Kubota, Naoto; Kadowaki, Takashi; Arner, Erik; Carninci, Piero; Ohara, Osamu; Arita, Makoto; Hattori, Masahira; Koyasu, Shigeo; Ohno, Hiroshi (2023). "Gut microbial carbohydrate metabolism contributes to insulin resistance". Nature. 621 (7978): 389–395. Bibcode:2023Natur.621..389T. doi:10.1038/s41586-023-06466-x. PMC 10499599. PMID 37648852.
- Takeuchi, Tadashi; Kameyama, Keishi; Miyauchi, Eiji; Nakanishi, Yumiko; Kanaya, Takashi; Fujii, Takayoshi; Kato, Tamotsu; Sasaki, Takaharu; Tachibana, Naoko; Negishi, Hiroki; Matsui, Misato; Ohno, Hiroshi (2023). "Fatty acid overproduction by gut commensal microbiota exacerbates obesity". Cell Metabolism. 35 (2): 361–375.e9. doi:10.1016/j.cmet.2022.12.013. PMID 36652945.
- Furusawa, Yukihiro; Obata, Yuuki; Fukuda, Shinji; Endo, Takaho A.; Nakato, Gaku; Takahashi, Daisuke; Nakanishi, Yumiko; Uetake, Chikako; Kato, Keiko; Kato, Tamotsu; Takahashi, Masumi; Fukuda, Noriko N.; Murakami, Shinnosuke; Miyauchi, Eiji; Hino, Shingo; Atarashi, Koji; Onawa, Satoshi; Fujimura, Yumiko; Lockett, Trevor; Clarke, Julie M.; Topping, David L.; Tomita, Masaru; Hori, Shohei; Ohara, Osamu; Morita, Tatsuya; Koseki, Haruhiko; Kikuchi, Jun; Honda, Kenya; Hase, Koji; Ohno, Hiroshi (2013). "Commensal microbe-derived butyrate induces the differentiation of colonic regulatory T cells". Nature. 504 (7480): 446–450. Bibcode:2013Natur.504..446F. doi:10.1038/nature12721. PMID 24226770.
- Fukuda, Shinji; Toh, Hidehiro; Hase, Koji; Oshima, Kenshiro; Nakanishi, Yumiko; Yoshimura, Kazutoshi; Tobe, Toru; Clarke, Julie M.; Topping, David L.; Suzuki, Tohru; Taylor, Todd D.; Itoh, Kikuji; Kikuchi, Jun; Morita, Hidetoshi; Hattori, Masahira; Ohno, Hiroshi (2011). "Bifidobacteria can protect from enteropathogenic infection through production of acetate". Nature. 469 (7331): 543–547. Bibcode:2011Natur.469..543F. doi:10.1038/nature09646. PMID 21270894.
- Hase, Koji; Kawano, Kazuya; Nochi, Tomonori; Pontes, Gemilson Soares; Fukuda, Shinji; Ebisawa, Masashi; Kadokura, Kazunori; Tobe, Toru; Fujimura, Yumiko; Kawano, Sayaka; Yabashi, Atsuko; Waguri, Satoshi; Nakato, Gaku; Kimura, Shunsuke; Murakami, Takaya; Iimura, Mitsutoshi; Hamura, Kimiyo; Fukuoka, Shin-Ichi; Lowe, Anson W.; Itoh, Kikuji; Kiyono, Hiroshi; Ohno, Hiroshi (2009). "Uptake through glycoprotein 2 of FimH(+) bacteria by M cells initiates mucosal immune response". Nature. 462 (7270): 226–230. doi:10.1038/nature08529. PMID 19907495.
- Ohno, Hiroshi; Stewart, Jay; Fournier, Marie-Christine; Bosshart, Herbert; Rhee, Ina; Miyatake, Shoichiro; Saito, Takashi; Gallusser, Andreas; Kirchhausen, Tomas; Juan S. Bonifacino (1995). "Interaction of tyrosine-based sorting signals with clathrin-associated proteins". Science. 269 (5232): 1872–1875. Bibcode:1995Sci...269.1872O. doi:10.1126/science.7569928. PMID 7569928.
