= Armored Police Metal Jack =

Japanese anime television series

- Cover artwork for the Japanese DVD release
- 機甲警察メタルジャック
- Genre: Action, mecha, police
- Creator: Hajime Yatate
- Directors: Hiroshi Matsuzono (1–8); Kiyoshi Egami (chief, 9–37)
- Series composition: Hiroyuki Kawasaki
- Character designer: Yorihisa Uchisa
- Music: Yasunori Iwasaki
- Country of origin: Japan
- Original language: Japanese
- No. of episodes: 37

Production
- Producers: Shinsuke Kurabayashi (TV Tokyo); Masashi Kanō (I&S); Yōichi Ikeda (Sunrise)
- Production companies: TV Tokyo; I&S; Sunrise

Original release
- Network: TXN (TV Tokyo)
- Release: April 1 – December 23, 1991

Related
- Novel series
- Written by: Hiroyuki Kawasaki
- Illustrated by: Yorihisa Uchida
- Published by: Tairiku Shobo
- Imprint: Neo Fantasy Bunko
- Original run: February 20, 1992 – April 17, 1992
- Volumes: 2
- Video game
- Developer: KID
- Publisher: Takara Co., Ltd.
- Genre: War simulation
- Platform: Game Boy
- Released: JP: January 8, 1992
- Video game
- Publisher: Atlus
- Genre: Beat 'em up
- Platform: Super Famicom
- Released: JP: July 31, 1992; NA: Cancelled

Armored Police Metal Jack (Japanese: 機甲警察メタルジャック, Hepburn: Kikō Keisatsu Metaru Jakku) is a Japanese animated TV series produced by Sunrise, TV Tokyo and I&S BBDO. It was directed by Hiroshi Matsuzono and Kiyoshi Egami, with Hiroyuki Kawasaki handling series scripts, Yorihisa Uchida designing the characters, Yukihiro Makino designing the mechanical elements and Yasunori Iwasaki composing the music. The series was broadcast by TV Tokyo affiliates on the Monday 5:30 pm time slot and aired weekly from April 7 to December 23, 1991, lasting 37 episodes.

Metal Jack was originally planned as a sequel to the live-action tokusatsu show Dennou Keisatsu Cybercop, but due to complications with the show's production, it was made into an animated series instead without any official ties to Cybercop. However, due to low viewership, the length of the show's run was shortened by thirteen episodes. Head writer Hiroyuki Kawasaki would later recycle some of the same situations from Metal Jack in Brave Police J-Decker. The show was also the debut of Nobutoshi Canna (who acted under the birth name of Nobutoshi Hayashi).

== Plot ==
The setting is Tokyo City, one of the world's leading high-tech futuristic cities. In the near future, the world is filled with unprecedented murders, terrorist attacks, and cyber crimes that exceed the limits of what the police can expect. Masanao Daigo of the Tokyo Metropolitan Police Department has been searching for the right people for the "Metal Project," a plan he has been developing for a long time.

One day, an army of Crime Mobiles, monster robots of the criminal organization "Id," appear at a party of the global Zaizen conglomerate and attack Jun Zaizen, the noble son of the conglomerate. Daigo is so impressed by the actions of Ken Kanzaki, a police detective, Ryō Aguri, an F1 racer, and Gō Gōda, a professional wrestler, who were seriously injured in an attempt to save him, that he reanimates them as cyborgs and gives them new bodies and missions as "Metal Jack," an armored police force, to reward their courage in the face of death.

== Characters ==
The main characters from left to right: Gō, Jōgasaki, Ken, Eriko, Ryō and Sayuri.

=== Metal Jack ===
Ken Kanzaki (神崎 ケン, Kanzaki Ken) / Red Jack (レッドジャック)
Voiced by: Nobutoshi Hayashi
Age 20. A cheerful, but easily irritated officer in the Tokyo Metropolitan Police Department. He was adopted and raised by police officer Genichirō Kanzaki, who met Ryō's biological mother while she was dying in the street. He is an expert marksman whose favorite gun is one that once belonged to his father. After being resurrected, he is forced to keep his membership in the Metal Jack unit a secret from his coworkers, although he eventually reveals his secret to the Chief in Episode 30. Loves his cybernetic police dog Lander. His blood type is a rare RH minus T type. When he undergoes the Hyperization process after he is mortally wounded a second time, his cells develop a high rate of necrosis to compensate for his actual biological origin. He is deeply afraid of snakes.
Ryō Aguri (アグリ・亮, Aguri Ryō) / Silver Jack (シルバージャック)
Voiced by: Daiki Nakamura
Age 23. A snobbish Formula 1 driver full of pride. He dislikes being overly formal to other people and only smiles in the company of close friends. Like Ken, he keeps his occupation as a member of Metal Jack a secret to his friends and family. In Episode 18, it is revealed he doesn't know how to ride a bicycle.
Gō Gōda (豪田 剛, Gōda Gō) / Blue Jack (ブルージャック)
Voiced by: Ken Yamaguchi
Age 21. A professional wrestler who aims to become the world's best, his ring name is "Gonzales Gō." He lives in an apartment room in a hospital and is a poor swimmer. Despite being the comic relief of the team, it is him, and not Ken, who ends up developing a romantic relationship with Ken's police partner Eriko.
Shadow (シャドウ) / Shadow Jack (シャドウジャック)
Voiced by: Yuu Shimaka
His real name is Dino (ディノ), also known by the codename B-9. Formerly a member of an armed special forces from an unspecified country, he was used as a test subject for the "B Project", where he was subjected into a prototype of the Jack Armor developed by Gilria. He suffered a memory lost as a result of the experiment. His desire to seek revenge has led him to Japan. He is not an actual member of Metal Jack, but always intervenes in their operations by using an old police radio which intercepts the calls between Metal Jack members.
Masanao Daigo (醍醐 正尚, Daigo Masanao)
Voiced by: Seizō Katō
The initiator of the Metal Project and the commander of Metal Jack unit. He has instructed the team to keep their real identities a secret from everyone else, including their friends and families.
Ginren Han (藩 銀蓮, Han Ginren)
Voiced by: Yūko Sasaki
A young female scientist who plays an integral role in the second phase of the Metal Project. When Ken is mortally wounded a second time, she initiates the Hyper Project and brings him back to life stronger than before. Despite having many would-be suitors due to her good looks, she is a mechaphile who is more attracted to machines than men.

=== Friends and relatives ===
Eriko Yoshizawa (吉沢 えり子, Yoshizawa Eriko)
Voiced by: Yuri Amano
Ken's partner in the MPD. She becomes romantically involved with Gō.
Chief Jōgasaki (城ヶ崎課長, Jōgasaki-kachō)
Voiced by: Minoru Inaba
Chief of the MPD's special investigations unit and boss to Ken and Eriko. He was involved in a robotic weapons smuggling case 18 years before the events of the series.
Sayuri Kanzaki (神崎 さゆり, Kanzaki Sayuri)
Voiced by: Kae Araki
Ken's foster younger sister, who is very close and protective of her older brother. She feels a sense of affection for Jun.
Genichirō Kanzaki (神崎 源一郎, Kanzaki Genichirō)
Voiced by: Kazuhiko Kishino
Ken's adoptive father, who was fatally wounded by a convict named Makieda when Ken was 10.
Kazumi Kanzaki (神崎 和美, Kanzaki Kazumi)
Voiced by: Hiroko Nishi
Ken and Sayuri's mother.
Hagiwara (萩原)
Voiced by: Hiroshi Ito
Gō's professional wrestling trainer and gym partner.

=== Id ===
Megadeth (メガデス)
Voiced by: Yuzuru Fujimoto
The leader of Id, a bioroid who resembles an elderly man. He seeks to assassinate Jun, who is later revealed to be his creator.
Troidal (トロイダル)
Voiced by: Show Hayami
The second-in-command of Id, a bioroid who resembles a young man. When he learns about his true origin from Megadeth, he becomes driven by revenge and seeks to destroy the entire human race in order to purify the world for bioroids. In Episode 18, it is revealed he is allergic to crabs.
Grunwald de Gilria (グルンワルト・ド・ギルリア)
Voiced by: Kenichi Ono
A scientist known by the alias of Nicholai Zaidenberg (ニコライ・ザイデンベルグ). He takes over Id after Megadeth's downfall.
Crola (クローラ)
Voiced by: Yumi Tōma
A female android created by Jun, although she is reprogrammed to serve Troidal when Neo Id is formed. Although she is unemotional at first, she gradually develops a sense of affection for Troidal.

=== Zaizen Group ===
Jun Zaizen (財前 純, Zaizen Jun)
Voiced by: Mari Maruta
The young heir of the Zaizen Group. Despite his young age, he is a gifted and highly-intelligent engineer and was in fact the one who constructed Megadeth and Troidal. Later it is revealed that he and Jun are brothers in a sense. In Episode 28, he is brainwashed and becomes the leader of Neo Id.
Shunichi Kiritani (霧谷 俊一, Kiritani Shunichi)
Voiced by: Kenichi Ono
Chief Secretary of the Zaizen Group. He holds a certain sense of adoration for Jun and always addresses him as "Mr. Jun".
Chairman Zaizen (財前会長, Zaizen-kachō)
Voiced by: Tatsuyuki Jinnai
Jun's father and chairman to the Zaizen Group. He is killed during the assassination attempt on his son during the first episode, although many secrets are revealed about him throughout the course of the series.

=== Criminals ===
Terrorist (テロリスト, Terorisuto; ep. 2)
Voiced by: Takurō Kitagawa
A man who wears mechanical goggles over his eyes and calls himself "The Fangs of Icarus," the name of his organization. He controls a special crystal monster purchased from Id in order to destroy the International Peace Summit. In the novel adaptation, the arms dealer Icarus appears with similar characterization.
Kadokura (門倉; ep. 3)
Voiced by: Norio Wakamoto
A mad scientist who seals off the underground city to take revenge on the world that did not recognize his achievements, and conducts experiments using his life's work, "human population psychology," to induce panic in the people he locks in.
Politician (政治家, Seijika; ep. 4)
Voiced by: Kan Tokumaru
As a result of Id's request to prevent a prosecutorial investigation into the company that would lead to evidence of corruption, a bombing of the Pleiades building by a non-existent bomb monster occurs.
Endō (遠藤, Endō; ep. 5)
Voiced by: Taimei Suzuki
He asks Id to rob the program data held by the AI research center. He is worried about Troidal, who is full of confidence while failing once.
Makieda (牧江田, ep. 7)
Voiced by: Yasuo Tanaka
A technical terrorist who was arrested by Ken's father, Genichirō, 10 years ago. Out of resentment, he escapes from prison and breaks into the Kanzaki household. He took the just-born Sayuri as a hostage and mortally wounded Genichirō, but lost his right hand when Ken (then 10 years old) selflessly picked up his father's Magnum. Now, he escapes from prison again and hacks a Workbot (a construction work robot), causing panic in the city.
Edmond Barox (エドモンド・バロックス, Edomondo Barokkusu; ep. 9)
Voiced by: Masaru Ikeda
Owner of the Barox Racing Team. Behind the scenes, he runs an illegal gambling ring with many cyborg racers, including John Maxon (Voiced by: Takehito Koyasu).
Herman and Otto Rheinmetall (ハーマン・オットー・ラインメタル, Hāman & Ottō Rainmetaru; ep. 12-13)
Voiced by: Kazuyuki Sogabe (Herman), Nobuo Tobita (Otto)
The Rheinmetall brothers are world-famous commercial kidnappers. They kidnap Jun and demand two masterpieces owned by the Zaizen conglomerate as ransom. Otto is caught up in Id's plan to take advantage of the kidnapping and kill Jun, and dies. Herman, who is left behind, decides to take revenge.
Tokura (戸倉; ep. 30)
Voiced by: Kiyoshi Kobayashi
He is a classmate of Chief Jōgasaki and is now a senior officer of the Metropolitan Police Department. He proposes a disciplinary dismissal for Ken, who disappears whenever there is an incident. Behind the scenes, however, he is a corrupt police officer who has been smuggling robot weapons for the past 18 years. Detective Tokimura (Voiced by: Hiroshi Hashimoto), his colleague at the time, senses his true identity and eliminates him.
The Denegger Gang (デネッガー4兄弟, Deneggā Yon Kyōdai; ep. 31)
Ultra-thugs wanted by Interpol for murder and robbery, among countless other crimes. Being super-accelerated cyborgs with far more power and speed than Metal Jack, the youngest brother, Nicola, was killed when a momentary gap created by Shadow's intervention was exploited just before Silver's murder. The breakage of the eye shield exposes Ryō's true identity, and the gang begins a war of revenge.

== Equipment ==
Jack Braces (ジャックブレス)
The bracelet worm by each member of Metal Jack, which they used to summon the Jack Suits and the Jack Armors. They also function as wireless communicators. The devices featured the Armored Police emblem stored in a compartment inside, which the team used to get a free pass during investigations. The Jack Brace used by Shadow is an older model full of scratches and equipped with a volume knob, and unlike the Jack Braces used by the main three heroes, it is not adorned with any emblem.
Jack Suits (ジャックスーツ)
The primary armor of the Metal Jacks, equipped during the initial phases of an investigation or a battle. They are transmitted unto the wearer's body through a Jack Brace through the command "Suit On!". The suits are all equipped with a small compression cylinder which allows for better evasive movement and the inhaling of gas.
Power Arm (パワーアーム)
A rescue tool used by the team when wearing the Jack Suits, its primary function is to save people's lives. In Episode 4, it was used to cut the cable of a shutter in order to rescue a group of people trapped inside a building. It also has the ability to clean up rubble.
Jack Chaser (ジャックチェイサー)
A patrol car with the capability of flight. It is used by both, the Metal Jacks and the regular police.
Buster Shot (バスターショット)
The standard-issue sidearm of the Metal Jacks. It can be transformed into a rifle by setting the long barrel that is folded underneath the standard barrel. This gimmick was carried over to the toy version, which changes the sound effect caused by the toy gun. The toy version was re-released as part of the Brave Police J-Decker toyline.
Cermet Stick (サーメットスティック)
A nightstick-like weapon used by the Metal Jacks. The sticks can be covered with energy that allows them to be used as swords.

=== Jack Armors ===
The Jack Armors (ジャックアーマー) are the secondary equipment of the Metal Jacks, which are wore over the Jack Suits when facing an extremely dangerous threat. They are transmitted unto the Jack Suits by the Jack Braces when the command "Jack On!" is given. The Jack Armors are actually support robots or vehicles that are dismantled into upper and lower armor, as well as weapons when they transform. When wearing a Jack Armor, the wearer's uncovered portions will not suffer damage even if the armors are destroyed. However, due to the fact that the armors are neurally linked to their bodies, their arms will sustain injuries if they carry too much load.

Red Jack Armor (レッドジャックアーマー)
Ken's armor. It is transformed from Ken's robotic dog companion called Lander (ランダー). Lander is usually colored black like other robotic dogs, but turns red when Ken transforms into his Jack Suit (Lander's weight also increases and some of his details are changed). Lander can also transform into a hoverbike named the Jack Speeder (ジャックスピーダー). Its special move is the Metal Crusher Punch (メタルクラッシャーパンチ), in which Ken approaches the enemy with a rolling dash, followed by strike with a super-vibrating fist. It is also equipped with a beam gun on its helmet. Its firearm is called the Hyper Magnum (ハイパー・マグナム).
Silver Jack Armor (シルバージャックアーマー)
Ryo's armor. It is transformed from a flying jet board called the Jack Falcon (ジャックファルコン). Its special move is the Blizzard Beam (ブリザードビーム), in which Ryo shoots freeze beams from both of his hands. Both of its arms are equipped with Electromagnetic Cutters (ソニックカッター, Sonic Cutter). Its firearm is called the Freezer Shot (フリーザーショット)
Blue Jack Armor (ブルージャックアーマー)
Go's armor. It is transformed from a large four-wheeled motorcycle called the Jack Roader (ジャックローダー), which has excellent underwater capabilities. Its special move is the Jet Dynamite (ジェットダイナマイト), in which Go performs an accelerated body rush with his armor's booster. Both of its shoulders are equipped with homing missile launchers. Its firearm is called the Prominencer (プロミネンサー).
Shadow Jack Armor (シャドウジャックアーマー)
Shadow's armor. It is transformed from a special security robot called Bolter (ボルター). Shadow can only wear the armor for a limited since it was originally an experimental prototype developed military. As a safety mechanism, it is automatically unequipped when the wearer has used for five minutes. It is equipped with numerous weapons such as missile launchers from chests and front shoulders and cannon from its back shoulders.
Hyper Red Jack Armor (ハイパーレッドジャックアーマー)
A new type of armor that was developed in preparations with the ever-increasing strength of Id's forces. It is eventually made into a second Jack Armor worn by Ken. It is transformed from a large three-wheeled bike called the Red Cepter (レッドセプター), which also transforms into a jet board called the Jet Cepter (ジェットセプター). Although it is highly efficient, Ken must carry on an even greater amount of weight than his regular Red Jack Armor. The head part of the Cepter machine can also split off from its body and form a bird-like mecha called the J-Bird (Jバード). Its special movie is the Jet Metal Crusher Punch (ジェットメタルクラッシャーパンチ), in which Ken accelerates using a pair of boosters equipped on his elbows. Its firearm is the Burst Riser (バーストライザー).

=== Others ===
Hybrid Jaguar (ハイブリッド・ジャガー)
A new type of armor worn by Troidal that was developed by Gilria to defeat the Metal Jack. Despite its similarities to the Jack Armors, it was never released as a toy.

== List of episodes ==
No.	Title	Directed by	Written by	Storyboarded by	Original release date
1	"First Battle"; Transliteration: "Fāsuto batoru" (Japanese: ファーストバトル)	Yū Kō	Hiroyuki Kawasaki	Hiroshi Matsuzono	8 April 1991
2	"Crystal Storm"; Transliteration: "Kurisutaru sutōmu" (Japanese: クリスタルストーム)	Kazushige Takatō	Hiroyuki Kawasaki	Kazushige Takatō	15 April 1991
3	"Panic Program"; Transliteration: "Panikku puroguramu" (Japanese: パニックプログラム)	Kazunori Mizuno	Naruhisa Arakawa	Hideki Tonokatsu	22 April 1991
4	"Running Man"; Transliteration: "Ranningu man" (Japanese: ランニングマン)	Yoshio Suzuki	Ryōe Tsukimura	Yoshio Suzuki	29 April 1991
5	"Power Fall"; Transliteration: "Pawā fōru" (Japanese: パワーフォール)	Akihiko Nishiyama	Katsuhiko Chiba	Akihiko Nishiyama	6 May 1991
6	"Hot Blood"; Transliteration: "Hotto buraddo" (Japanese: ホットブラッド)	Jun Kamiya	Hiroyuki Kawasaki	Jun Kamiya	13 May 1991
7	"Top Secret"; Transliteration: "Toppu shīkuretto" (Japanese: トップシークレット)	Takeshi Kabumoto	Hiroyuki Kawasaki	Jūgo Ōizumi	20 May 1991
8	"Soldier Blues"; Transliteration: "Sorujā burūsu" (Japanese: ソルジャーブルース)	Hideki Tonokatsu	Katsuhiko Chiba	Hideki Tonokatsu; Yū Kō	27 May 1991
9	"Dead Heat"; Transliteration: "Deddo hīto" (Japanese: デッド ヒート)	Masami Hayashi	Ryōe Tsukimura	Masami Hayashi	3 June 1991
10	"Metal Black (Part One)"; Transliteration: "Metaru burakku (zenpen)" (Japanese: メタルブラック（前編）)	Akihiko Nishiyama	Ryōe Tsukimura	Akihiko Nishiyama	10 June 1991
11	"Metal Black (Part Two)"; Transliteration: "Metaru burakku (kōhen)" (Japanese: メタルブラック（後編）)	Hideki Tonokatsu	Ryōe Tsukimura	Hideki Tonokatsu	17 June 1991
12	"Project Dark"; Transliteration: "Purojekuto dāku" (Japanese: プロジェクトダーク)	Takeshi Kabumoto	Katsuhiko Chiba	Takeshi Kabumoto	24 June 1991
13	"Id the Crime Syndicate"; Transliteration: "Hanzai soshiki Ido" (Japanese: 犯罪組織イド)	Yoshio Suzuki	Katsuhiko Chiba	Masami Hayashi	1 July 1991
14	"Lander Destruction Order"; Transliteration: "Randā hakai shirei" (Japanese: ランダー破壊指令)	Hideki Tonokatsu	Satoshi Namiki	Hideki Tonokatsu	8 July 1991
15	"Idol Policewoman Eriko"; Transliteration: "Aidoru fukei Eriko" (Japanese: アイドル婦警・えり子)	Takashi Kobayashi	Hiroyuki Kawasaki	Takashi Kobayashi	15 July 1991
16	"The Dangerous Visitor"; Transliteration: "Kiken na hōmonsha" (Japanese: 危険な訪問者)	Akihiko Nishiyama	Satoshi Namiki	Tsukasa Sunaga	29 July 1991
17	"The Future of Nightmares"; Transliteration: "Akumu no mirai" (Japanese: 悪夢の未来)	Takeshi Kabumoto	Ryōe Tsukimura	Kōji Itō	5 August 1991
18	"Weak Point"; Transliteration: "Wīku pointo" (Japanese: ウィーク・ポイント)	Hideki Tonokatsu	Katsuhiko Chiba	Yoshio Suzuki	12 August 1991
19	"Metal Jack Obliteration Order"; Transliteration: "Metaru Jakku massatsu shirei" (Japanese: 機甲警察(メタルジャック)抹殺司令)	Akihiko Nishiyama	Hiroyuki Kawasaki	Shinobu Nakamori	19 August 1991
20	"The Beautiful Female Scientist"; Transliteration: "Utsukushiki onna kagakusha" (Japanese: 美しき女科学者)	Takashi Kobayashi	Ryōe Tsukimura	Shinya Sadamitsu	26 August 1991
21	"Death Red"; Transliteration: "Desu Reddo" (Japanese: デス・レッド)	Takeshi Kabumoto	Hiroyuki Kawasaki	Takeshi Kabumoto	2 September 1991
22	"Hyper Red"; Transliteration: "Haipā Reddo" (Japanese: ハイパー・レッド)	Akihiko Nishiyama	Hiroyuki Kawasaki	Hideki Tonokatsu	9 September 1991
23	"Jun Zaizen Assassination Order"; Transliteration: "Zaizen Jun ansatsu shirei" (Japanese: 財前純 暗殺指令)	Jōjirō Okami	Hiroyuki Kawasaki	Kazuo Tomizawa	16 September 1991
24	"Light vs. Darkness"; Transliteration: "Hikari to yami no taiketsu" (Japanese: 光と闇の対決)	Takeshi Kabumoto	Hiroyuki Kawasaki	Hidetoshi Ōmori	23 September 1991
25	"At the End of the Struggle..."; Transliteration: "Shitō no hate ni..." (Japanese: 死闘の果てに......)	Akihiko Nishiyama	Hiroyuki Kawasaki	Yasunao Aoki	30 September 1991
26	"The Recalled Past"; Transliteration: "Yomigaeru kako" (Japanese: よみがえる過去)	Takeshi Kabumoto	Ryōe Tsukimura	Junji Nishimura	7 October 1991
27	"The Created"; Transliteration: "Tsukurareshi mono-tachi" (Japanese: 創られし者たち)	Akihiko Nishiyama	Katsuhiko Chiba	Jōjirō Okami	14 October 1991
28	"Id's Revival"; Transliteration: "Ido fukkatsu" (Japanese: イド復活)	Kazuya Miyazaki	Hiroyuki Kawasaki	Kunihisa Sugishima	21 October 1991
29	"Mechanical Goddess Crola"; Transliteration: "Kikai no megami Kurōra" (Japanese: 機械の女神クローラ)	Takeshi Kabumoto	Ryōe Tsukimura	Hidetoshi Ōmori	28 October 1991
30	"Five Minutes to Statute Expiration"; Transliteration: "Jikō seiritsu 5-fun mae" (Japanese: 時効成立5分前)	Hisashi Abe	Katsuhiko Chiba	Ryūtarō Nakamura	4 November 1991
31	"Midday Lightning"; Transliteration: "Mahiru no inazuma" (Japanese: 真昼の稲妻)	Yoshio Suzuki	Ryōe Tsukimura	Kiyoshi Egami	11 November 1991
32	"Racer Report"; Transliteration: "Rēsā ripōto" (Japanese: レーサー・リポート)	Akihiko Nishiyama	Katsuhiko Chiba	Atsuko Kase	18 November 1991
33	"The Steel Rose"; Transliteration: "Hagane no bara" (Japanese: 鋼のバラ)	Mihiro Yamaguchi	Hiroyuki Kawasaki	Atsuko Kase	25 November 1991
34	"Millennium City"; Transliteration: "Mireniamu shiti" (Japanese: ミレニアム・シティ)	Takeshi Kabumoto	Ryōe Tsukimura	Hidetoshi Ōmori	2 December 1991
35	"In Search of Stolen Time"; Transliteration: "Ubawareta toki o motomete" (Japanese: 奪われた時を求めて)	Yoshio Suzuki	Katsuhiko Chiba	Hideki Tonokatsu	9 December 1991
36	"Showdown: Red vs. Jun"; Transliteration: "Taiketsu Reddo VS Jun" (Japanese: 対決レッドVS純)	Akihiko Nishiyama	Hiroyuki Kawasaki	Hideki Tonokatsu	16 December 1991
37	"Final Battle"; Transliteration: "Fainaru batoru" (Japanese: ファイナルバトル)	Takeshi Kabumoto	Hiroyuki Kawasaki	Kiyoshi Egami	23 December 1991

== Merchandise ==
=== Toys ===
Takara released a set of action figures based on the show under a line called the "Armored Police Series". Each set came packaged with an action figure and a robotic partner or vehicle that could transform into powered suits worn by the figures. The available sets were Red Jack Armor, Silver Jack Armor, Blue Jack Armor, Shadow Jack Armor and Hyper Red Jack Armor. Model kits were also released of the five Jack Armors called the "Jack On Collection". Other toys were released by Takara, including toy versions of the Jack Chaser, Jack Braces and Buster Shot.

=== Soundtracks ===
A CD single (Hold On), two albums (Just Dream On and PARTY JACK) and two drama CDs (Count Down and HARD PLAY) were released by King Records.

- Armored Police Metal Jack: Hold On (KIDA-18, 1991/05/05)
- Armored Police Metal Jack: Count Down (KICA-63, 1991/07/16)
- Armored Police Metal Jack: HARD PLAY (KICA-67, 1991/10/21)
- Armored Police Metal Jack: Just Dream On (KICA-86, 1992/02/05)
- Armored Police Metal Jack: PARTY JACK (KICA-103 1992/04/04)

=== Video games ===
- Armored Police Metal Jack - Released by Takara for the Game Boy on January 8, 1992. It is a turn-based tactical game that loosely follows the series' storyline. It was developed by KID.
- Armored Police Metal Jack - Released by Atlus for the Super Famicom on July 31, 1992. It is a side-scrolling action game. A North American version was planned but later cancelled, with the story's setting changed from Tokyo to Los Angeles. The heroes' names were also changed from Ken Kanzaki, Ryō Aguri and Gō Gōda to Ken Striker, Billy Crash and Jake Gonzales respectively. Id's name was changed to CRASS.

=== Home video ===
The series was gradually released on VHS and Laserdisc following its original airing by King Records. Ten volumes were released in total, with four episodes each for the first eight volumes, three episodes for Vol. 9 and two episodes and a special interview for Vol. 10. A later DVD set of all 37 episodes was released in Japan by King Records on June 7, 2006, to commemorate the show's 15th anniversary.

=== Books ===
- Metal Jack Mini Mook, published by Movic Co. Ltd. on September 1, 1992. It is the only mook based on the series. The pages of animation model sheets include line drawings, detailed traits of each character, and specifications of each mecha. It also includes a newly written short story "ONCE MORE AGAIN" (written by Tsukiko Arata and illustrated by Shiomi Koohara), which describes an episode that falls in the interval of the TV series.
- Armored Police Metal Jack, a two-volume novel written by head writer Hiroyuki Kasawaki and published by Tairiku Shobo in 1992. It features some differences in plot developments from the TV series, such as Id collapsing in the first volume and Shadow appearing only in the second volume. In addition, none of the Jack Armors appear on the cover, frontispieces, or in any of the illustrations in the text.
