= Hiroshi Ito (disambiguation) =

Hiroshi Ito or Hiroshi Itō may refer to:

- Hiroshi Ito (糸博) (born 1933), voice actor
- Hiroshi Itō (伊藤洋), 2008 IBM Fellow
- Hiroshi Ito, president of Kawasaki Motors
- Hiroshi Ito, car racer, including in the 2024 Super Taikyu Series
- Hiroshi Ito, sculptor father of Kaori Ito (born 1979)
- Rear Admiral Hiroshi Ito, 2015 commander of Combined Task Force 151
