= Hiroshi Tomihari =

Japanese printmaker

Hiroshi Tomihari (富張 広司, Tomihari Hiroshi; born 1936, Ibaraki Prefecture) is a Japanese artist specializing in modern moku hanga woodblock prints. He turned to the medium in 1959, about two years after his graduation from Ibaraki University. He has since had numerous exhibitions in Japan, the U.S., and Australia. In 1978–79, the Japanese Ministry of Culture sent him to the U.S. as a delegate artist.
