= Hiroshi Naganuma =

Japanese shogi player (born 1965)

- Native name: 長沼洋
- Born: February 8, 1965 (age 61)
- Hometown: Gifu Prefecture

Career
- Achieved professional status: July 21, 1986 (aged 21)
- Badge number: 178
- Rank: 8-dan
- Retired: May 1, 2025 (aged 60)
- Teacher: Kaishū Tanaka (9-dan)
- Career record: 598–627 (.488)

Websites
- JSA profile page

Hiroshi Naganuma (長沼 洋, Naganuma Hiroshi; born February 8, 1965) is a Japanese retired professional shogi player who achieved the rank of 8-dan.

== Early life and apprenticeship ==
Naganuma was born on February 8, 1965, in Gifu Prefecture. He entered the Japan Shogi Association's apprentice school at the rank of 5-kyū in 1979 under the guidance of shogi professional Kaishū Tanaka. He was promoted to the rank or 1-dan in 1981, and obtained full professional status and the rank of 4-dan in July 1986.

== Shogi professional ==
=== Playing style ===
Naganuma is known for a utilitarian playing style which prioritorizes material advantages over positional ones. For this reason, he has been nicknamed the 駒取り坊主 (Komatori Bōzu) where komatori refers to "shogi piece capturing" and bōzu refers to a "Buddhist monk".

On April 1, 2025, the JSA announced Naganuma had met the conditions for mandatory retirement for "Free Class" players and his retirement would become official upon completion of his final scheduled game of the 2025–2024 shogi season. Naganuma's retirement became official upon losing to Kenji Kanzaki on May 1, 2025, in a 38th Ryūō Group 6 game. He finished his career with a record of 598 wins and 627 losses for a winning percentage of 0.488.

=== Promotion history ===
Naganuma's promotion history is as follows:

- 5-kyū: 1979
- 1-dan: 1981
- 4-dan: July 21, 1986
- 5-dan: July 31, 1991
- 6-dan: November 7, 1997
- 7-dan: January 26, 2006
- 8-dan: August 31, 2020
- Retired: May 1, 2025

=== Awards and honors ===
In 2011, Naganuma received the Japan Shogi Association's "25 Years Service Award" in recognition of being an active professional for twenty-five years.
