= Hiroshi Yamazaki (weightlifter) =

Japanese weightlifter (born 1937)

Personal information
- Nationality: Japanese
- Born: 14 June 1937 (age 87); Hyogo, Japan

Sport
- Sport: Weightlifting

Hiroshi Yamazaki (山崎 弘, Yamazaki Hiroshi, born 14 June 1937) is a Japanese weightlifter. He competed at the 1960 Summer Olympics and the 1964 Summer Olympics.
