= Hiroshi Ota =

Japanese diplomat (born 1936)

Hiroshi Ota (太田 博, Ōta Hiroshi; born October 7, 1936) is a Japanese diplomat.

== Education ==
He studied at University of Tokyo and entered the Japanese Ministry of Foreign Affairs in 1960.

== Career ==
He served as Japanese Ambassador to Saudi Arabia in 1992-1994 and to Thailand in 1996–1999.
