= Hiroshi Imai (engineer) =

Japanese engineer

- 今井 宏
- Education: University of Tokyo
- Occupation: Engineer
- Employer: Bridgestone
- Known for: Tyre engineer
- Title: Vice President, Motorsports

Hiroshi Imai (Japanese: 今井 宏, Hepburn: Imai Hiroshi) is a Japanese Formula One and motorsports engineer. He is currently the Vice President of Motorsport at the Bridgestone tyre company.

== Career ==
Imai studied Mechanical Engineering at the University of Tokyo, graduating with a master's degree in 1990. He joined Bridgestone the same year, beginning a career focused on tyre development and performance engineering. He began working in Formula One in 2003 and during Bridgestone's participation, he played a key role in the design, testing, and trackside optimisation of race tyres, contributing to multiple Drivers’ and Constructors’ Championships achieved by Bridgestone-supplied teams.

Seeking a different challenge, Imai moved to McLaren in 2009 as a Principal Engineer, acting as a central liaison between the team and tyre suppliers while continuing to specialise in tyre behaviour and vehicle performance correlation. In 2017 he was appointed Chief Race Engineer, overseeing trackside engineering operations before being promoted to Director-level roles responsible for race engineering as well as tyres and brakes performance integration. He played a key role in McLaren's revival which culminated in the team winning the constructors championship in 2024.

In 2025, Imai returned to Bridgestone in a senior executive capacity as vice president and Senior Officer for motorsports tyre development and technology, where he leads the company's global motorsport technical strategy and performance research.
