= Hiroshi Awatsuji =

Japanese textile designer

- 粟辻 博 (Awatsuji Hiroshi)
- Born: 1929; Kyoto, Japan
- Died: 1995 (aged 65–66)
- Education: Kyoto Municipal Arts College
- Known for: Textile design

Hiroshi Awatsuji (粟辻 博, Awatsuji Hiroshi; 1929 – 1995), was a Japanese textile designer. After World War II, he produced numerous innovative designs which inspired the beginning of a new era. His works are characterized by the use of vivid colors and daring compositions which combine Japanese traditional arts and Western textile design.

== Biography ==
Awatsuji was born in Kyoto, Japan in 1929. He graduated from the Kyoto Municipal Arts College (later called Kyoto City University of Arts) in 1950. Between 1950 and 1954, he worked for Kanegafuchi Spinning Company (now called Kanebo), and then at Kenjiro Oishi Studio. In 1958, he started his own design studio, and in 1963/4, he began design collaborations with Fujie Textile.

Awatsuji designed the curtains and carpets used in two pavilions during the 1970 World Exposition in Osaka.

Awatsuji founded his own design company, AWA, in 1988. AWA was known for its home goods, in particular its black-and-white patterned textiles and tableware.

== Awards ==
He was the recipient of the Mainichi Industrial Design Award in 1971, the Japan Interior Designer's Association Award in 1972, and the Silver Award in Industrial Arts at the Third Textile Triennale in Todz, Poland, in 1978. He received the Gold Prize in 1992 at the 28th ID Annual Design Review (USA), and, shortly before his death in 1995, received the Kitaro Kunii Industrial Design Award.
