= Hiroshi Harashima =

Japanese researcher (born 1945)

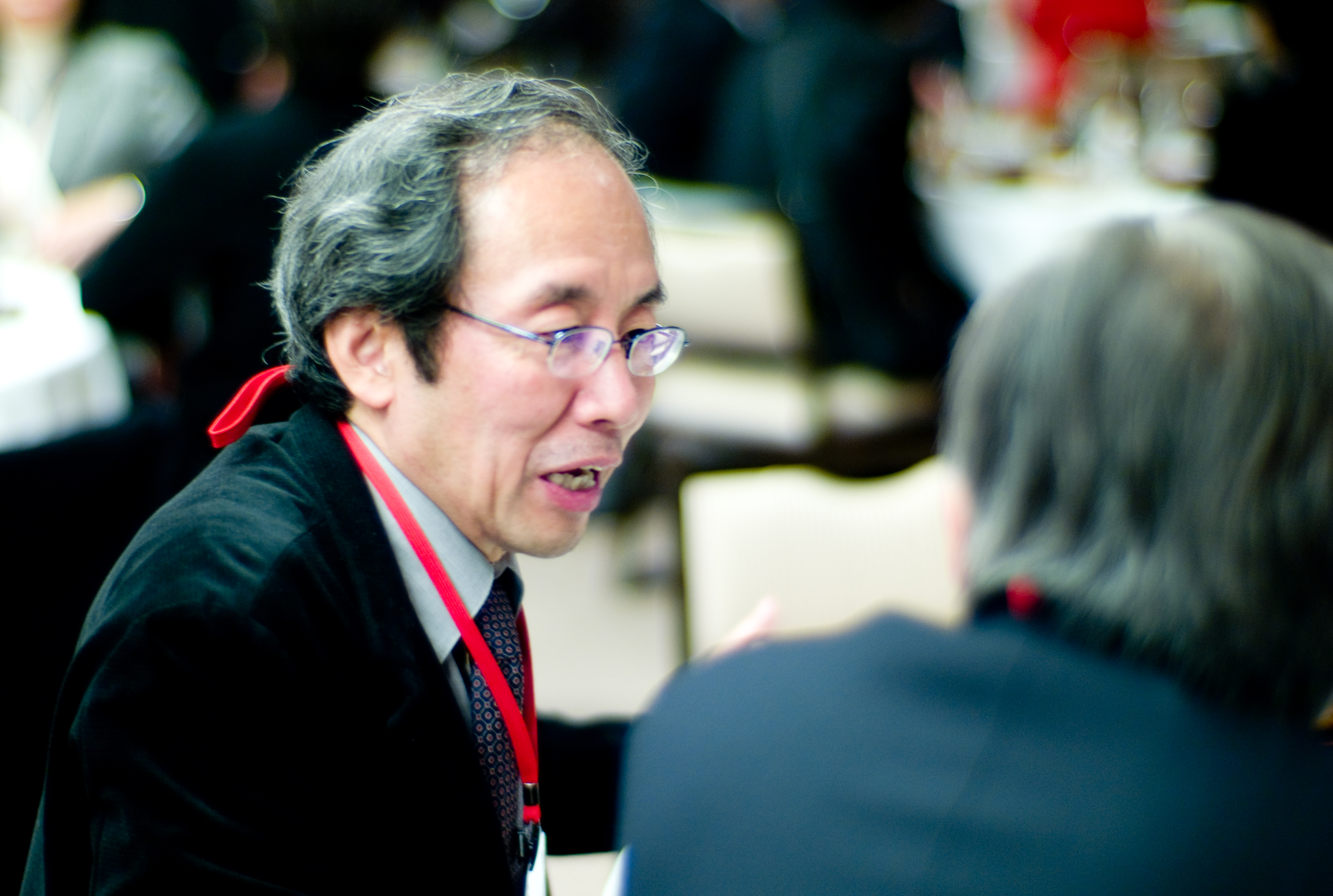
Hiroshi Harashima

Hiroshi Harashima (原島 博; born 1945 in Tokyo) is a Japanese researcher who founded Japanese Academy of Facial Studies in 1995. He is a professor at the University of Tokyo. Harashima graduated from the University of Tokyo in 1968 and received a Ph.D. in 1973 from the same school.
