= Hiroshi Tsukamoto =

Japanese baseball player

Hiroshi Tsukamoto 塚本 洋

Chunichi Dragons – No. 95
- Conditioning Coach
- Born: July 14, 1975 (age 50); Saitama, Japan

Teams
- As Coach: Chunichi Dragons (2003–present)

Hiroshi Tsukamoto (塚本 洋, Tsukamoto Hiroshi; born July 15, 1975 in Saitama, Japan) is a Japanese conditioning coach for the Chunichi Dragons in Japan's Nippon Professional Baseball.

== Career ==
Tsuakamoto is a graduate of Seibudaichiba High School and Osaka University of Health and Sport Sciences.

Following graduation from university, Tsukamoto worked with Matsushita Electronics Baseball Club (Now Panasonic) as conditioning coach for 5 years.

At university, he was a trainer for Koji Uehara.

Tsukamoto was brought to the Nippon Professional Baseball club, the Chunichi Dragons by then second team coach, Kenichiro Kawamura where he has been employed as conditioning coach since 2003.
