= Hiroshi Imazato =

Imperial Japanese Navy rear admiral (1896–1942)

- 今里 博
- The 45th graduating class in the Etajima Naval Academy in November 1917
- Born: September 24, 1896; Nagasaki, Japan
- Died: November 11, 1942 (aged 46); Indian Ocean
- Education: Etajima Naval Academy; Torpedo School
- Military career
- Allegiance: Empire of Japan
- Branch: Imperial Japanese Navy
- Service years: 1917–1942
- Rank: Rear admiral (posthumously)
- Commands: 20th Submarine Division; 1st Submarine Division; 2nd Submarine Division; Hokoku Maru
- Conflicts: World War II †

Hiroshi Imazato (今里 博, Imazato Hiroshi; September 24, 1896 – August 25, 1942) was a captain in the Imperial Japanese Navy during World War II. He was posthumously promoted to rear admiral.

== Biography ==
Imazato was born in Nagasaki on September 24, 1896. He graduated from the Etajima Naval Academy in November 1917, and then went to the Torpedo School at the Yokosuka Naval Arsenal. He later specialized in submarines, and became commander of the 20th Submarine Division in November 1939.

On August 11, 1941, he became commander of the 1st Submarine Division and switched to the 2nd Submarine Division in February 1942. He eventually became commander of Hokoku Maru on August 25, 1942 and was killed in an engagement on November 11, 1942 in the Indian Ocean. After his death, he was posthumously promoted to rear admiral.
