= Hiroshi Kajiwara =

20th-century Japanese pianist

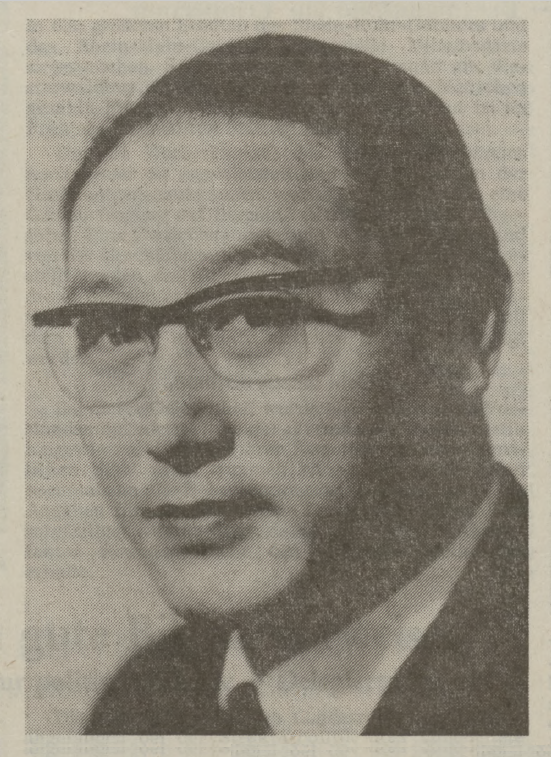
Hiroshi Kajiwara

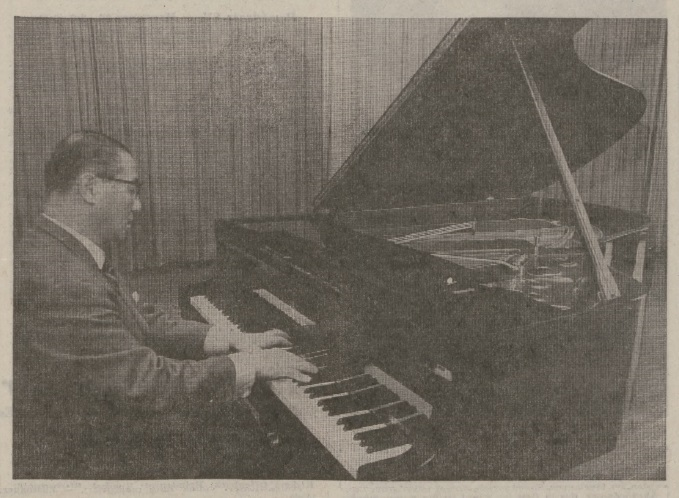
Hiroshi Kajiwara plays the new Steinway grand piano in the auditorium of the Freiherr-vom-Stein-Gymnasium in Betzdorf/Kirchen in February 1976.

Hiroshi Kajiwara 梶原完 (9 November 1924 in Shanghai – 29 July 1989 in Germany) was a Japanese pianist, a piano virtuoso of international renown and music educator Kajiwara Kan was commonly known in Japan as Kajiwara Kan or Kajikan.

== Youth and education ==
His mother Tsuneko Koyama was a professor at Tokyo Women's Technical College. He was the younger of two brothers. Because his father worked in Shanghai for the office of the research department of the Manchurian Railway, Hiroshi was born Japanese in Shanghai. In 1929, his mother returned to Japan with him and his elder brother. He attended Seino Elementary School and Tokyo Prefectural Junior High School No. 7, where he studied piano under Nori Tanaka, Eiichi Hagiwara and Naotoshi Fukui. He attended Tokyo Prefectural Shichi Junior High School. As a junior high school student at an event marking the anniversary of the death of a former Tennō, he played Beethoven's Moonlight Sonata and Chopin's Fantaisie-Impromptu to great acclaim. At the Tokyo Music School, he was a sought-after piano accompanist. He often practised for about 10 hours a day to improve his technique. After obtaining his high school diploma, he enrolled and graduated from the Tokyo National University of Fine Arts and Music. After graduating he performed vigorously, playing solos, concerts to earn money for solo concerts and overseas studies.

== Musical career ==
While working at the university as a part-time lecturer, he was also professionally active as a pianist. He was a member of the Toyama School of the Army military band with Kuma Dan, Yasushi Akutagawa, Kojun Saito, Tetsuaki Hagiwara and others. He became an assistant professor of music at the Tokyo National University of Fine Arts and Music. He gave his first recital at the Hibiya Public Hall. Later he also studied in Austria and Germany. As part of his further piano studies, he was also a student of Artur Schnabel.

Between November 1946 and May 1948, a piano concerto was composed by Fumio Hayasaka which was premiered in Tokyo on 22 June 1948 with Hiroshi Kajiwara as soloist on the grand piano and the Toho Symphony Orchestra (today's Tokyo Symphony Orchestra) under Masashi Ueda.

Kajiwara was the first pianist to be educated in Japan before and during the war, and to play on the European stage.

== Concerts and work in Europe ==
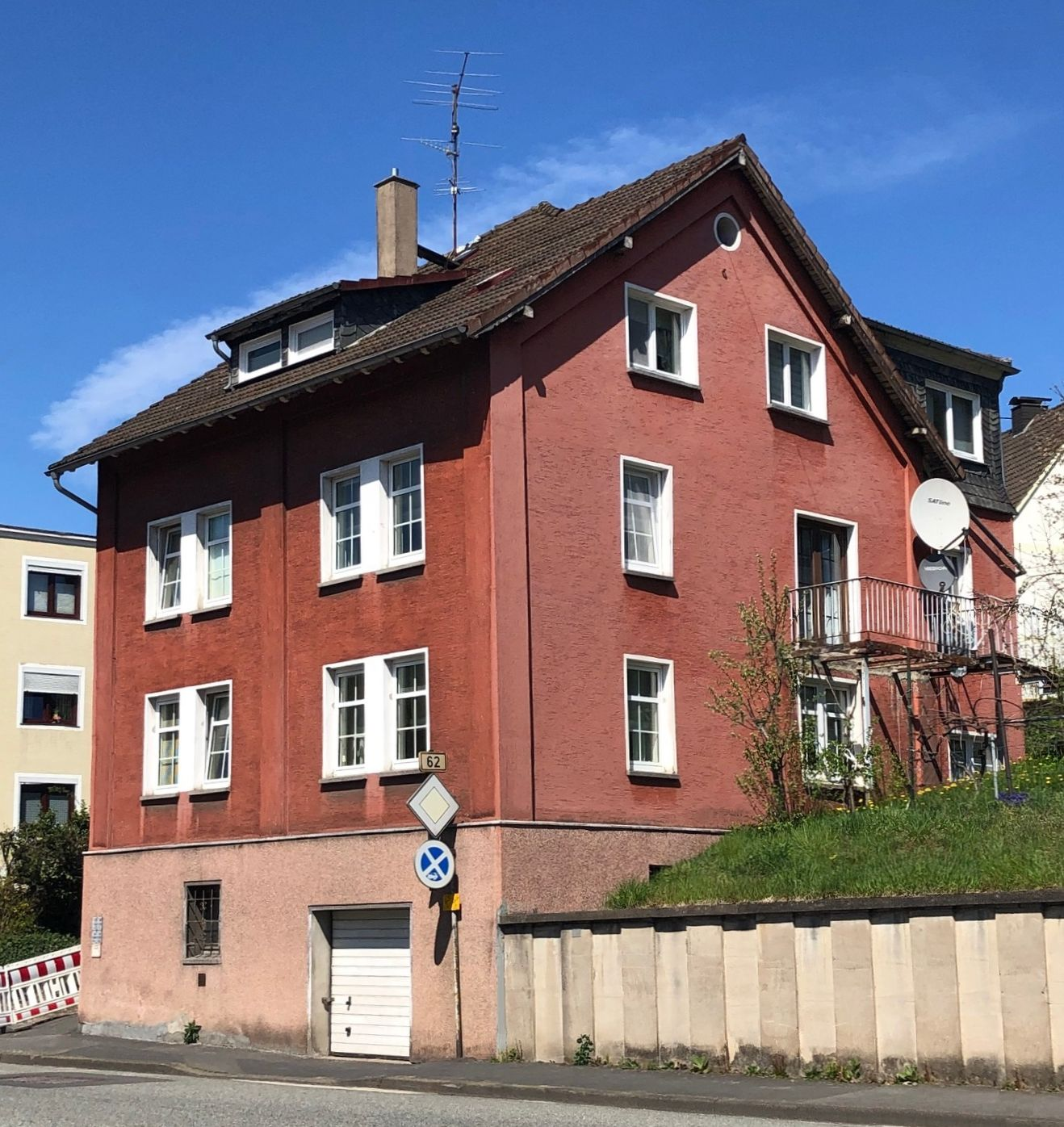
Former building of the Adorf Music Conservatory in Betzdorf/Sieg

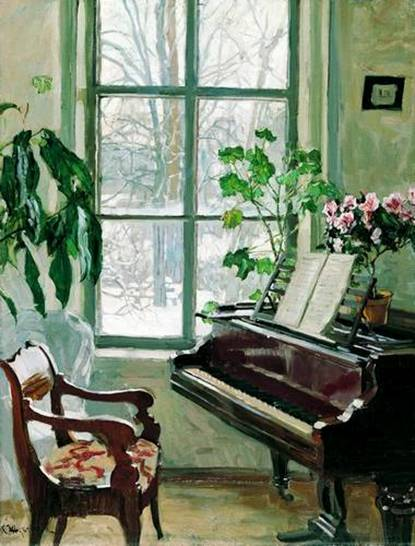
Painting of a Piano Room (Stanisław Żukowski)

In the 1950s Hiroshi Kajiwara moved permanently to Europe accompanied by his mother and continued to study with Alfred Cortot. He was a concert pianist and played all over Europe, from Scandinavia in the north to Palermo in the south. At one time he played in about 50 concerts a year. Besides his international concert tours and piano recitals in the immediate vicinity Professor Hiroshi Kajiwara gave piano lessons at the Adorf Music Conservatory, which was located in Betzdorf in the Siegen area from 1950 to 1990. He owed his large repertoire to his excellent ability to memorise and play musical texts and music he heard after reading or listening to them for the first time.

The first report from the archives of the Siegen Newspaper about a piano concert in Würgendorf 1958 has the headline: "A star in the panist sky". The newspaper review says that from works by Mozart, Beethoven, Chopin, Kiyose, Tchaikovsky and Liszt he made deeply felt statements with a mature musical design, he was a pianist of exceptional talent with impeccable technique, outstanding artistic ability combined with fine sensitivity. He also played three Japanese folk dances. In each performance there was a broad playing culture, clarity, beauty of sound and brilliance. Many similar concert reviews follow from the years 1964 to 1989, in one of which he was described as a "witty pianist of great doing".

He had a friendly personality. His house was a meeting place for his friends. As a teacher, he often invited his students to his home and was popular with his friends and students. At a time when he was concentrating on his teaching at the Adorf Music Conservatory, the number of students rose. It was not unusual for him to drive his students home in his car late at night, as he loved teaching.

The pianist Uta Sophie Adorf, a daughter of the founder, Pianists like Hans-Georg Gaydoul, or for example the choirmaster and chairman of the International Choral Conductors' Association Matthias Merzhäuser and other important musicians received piano lessons from him as children and in their youth. The career of violinist Bernhard Wacheux began in the Siegen area when he was able to play as a duo with Hiroshi Kajiwara.

"Studying the republication of Czerny's On the Correct Performance of the Complete Ludwig van Beethoven's Piano Works from the Universal Edition of 1963, we are immersed ... into a fascinating and exciting piano playing practice, such as was cultivated live in the 1950s and 1960s only by grandchildren of Schnabel, such as the Japanese virtuoso Hiroshi Kajiwara, who died in 1989". (Quote: H. U. Behner). Some pieces played by Kajiwara at concerts were recorded on recordings available at the time, including works by Ludwig van Beethoven, Frédéric Chopin, Ernst von Dohnányi, Emmanuel Chabrier, Antonín Dvořák, Franz Liszt and Felix Mendelssohn Bartholdy.

Hajime Okumura (1925–1994), a Japanese composer who wrote numerous film scores, had composed two sonatinas that were first heard on NHK radio in 1952. Hiroshi Kajiwara heard them on the radio and then played both of them in Germany for the first time.

Chieko Hara and Kiyoko Tanaka are probably the best known Japanese pianists who were based in Europe during the pre-war and post-war periods. Both of them studied under Lazare Lévy at the Conservatoire National de Musique in Paris, graduating with distinction, and both were prizewinners and winners of international competitions, so their careers were very spectacular and they continued to perform in Europe. Although Kajiwara had made a spectacular debut in Japan just after the war, he never took part in any international competitions and never won any prizes, so his career was rather modest compared to that of Chieko Hara and Kiyoko Tanaka. The two pianists had received their musical training in the French style under Lazare Lévy. His playing as a virtuoso pianist differed from that of the two pianists in that he had a distinctly dynamic style. For some reason, he disliked recording, and there are almost no studio or live recordings of his music, with the only remaining sources being tapes made for broadcast by broadcasters and private recordings made by his pupils.

== Honours ==
In 1989 Hiroshi Kajiwara was awarded the Gregor Wolf Prize.

== End of his life ==
He died in Germany at the age of 64 from the symptoms of Diabetes on 29 July 1989.
