= Yuji Onizaki =

Japanese baseball player (born 1983)

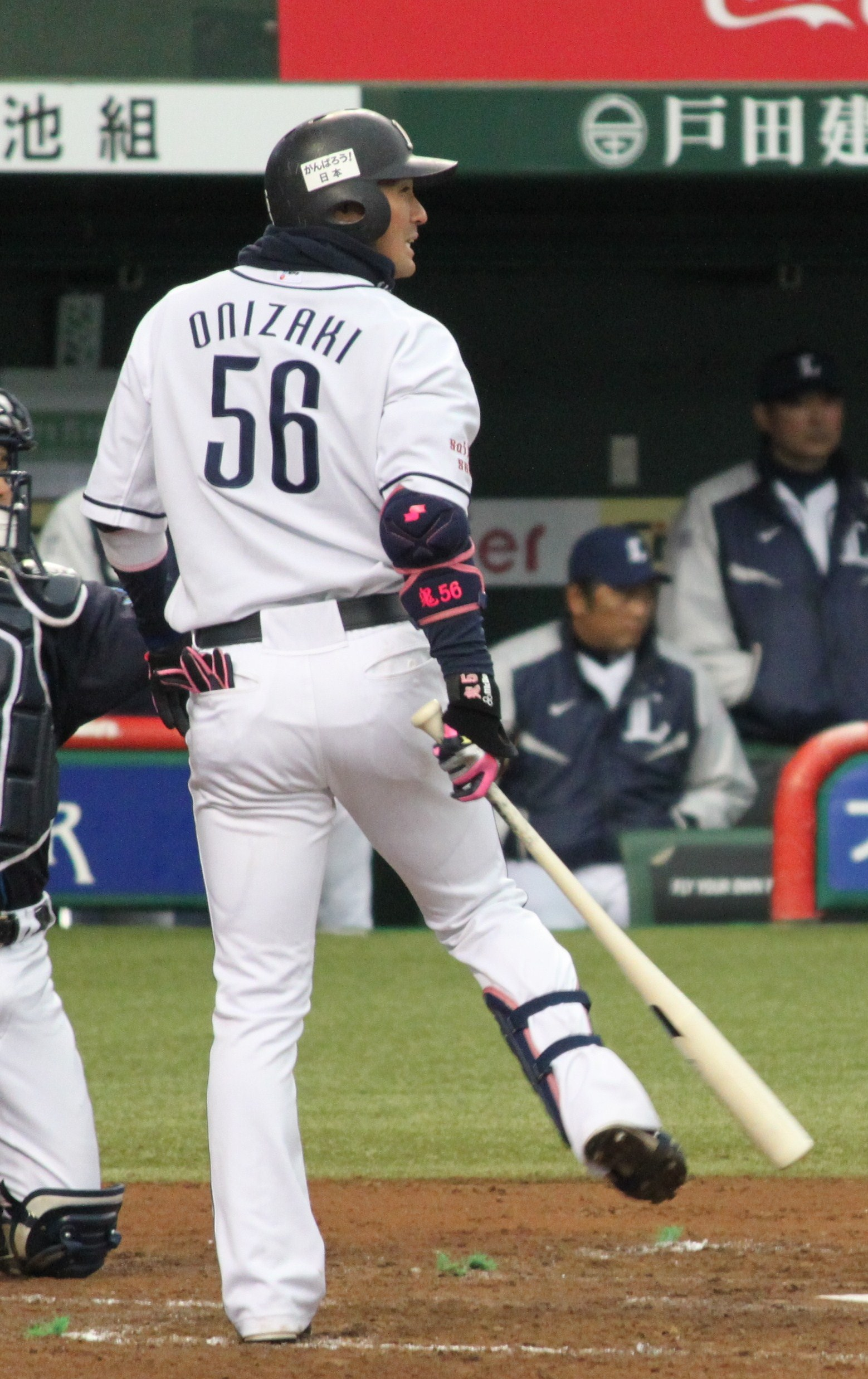
- Onizaki with the Saitama Seibu Lions

Saitama Seibu Lions – No. 94
- Infielder / Coach
- Born: April 7, 1983 (age 43)
- Batted: Left Threw: Right

NPB debut
- April 5, 2008, for the Tokyo Yakult Swallows

Last NPB appearance
- August 12, 2016, for the Saitama Seibu Lions

NPB statistics
- Batting average: .238
- Home runs: 6
- RBI: 65
- Stats at Baseball Reference

Teams
- As player: Tokyo Yakult Swallows (2008–2011); Saitama Seibu Lions (2011–2017); As coach: Saitama Seibu Lions (2021–2021, 2023–present)

Yuji Onizaki (鬼﨑 裕司, born April 7, 1983, in Saga, Saga) is a Japanese professional baseball infielder for the Saitama Seibu Lions in Japan's Nippon Professional Baseball.
