= Hiroshi Udagawa =

Japanese archaeologist and anthropologist

- Born: Missing required parameter 1=month! , 1944; Hokkaido, Japan
- Other name: 宇田川 洋
- Occupations: Archaeologist, Anthropologist

Hiroshi Udagawa (宇田川 洋, Udagawa Hiroshi; born 1944) is a Japanese archaeologist and anthropologist.

== Biography ==
He is a professor emeritus at the University of Tokyo since 1994, he is an expert in Ainu and northern/Siberian archeology. He is mainly involved in archaeological research of the Jōmon period, and is an authority on Okhotsk culture through Satsumon era. He has authored a number of books specifically about Ainu archaeology, including a 1986 book on the Ainu musical instrument, the tonkori, in collaboration with Eijiro Kanaya. Although professor of the University of Tokyo, the majority of his career was spent in the North Sea Cultural Studies training facility in the town of Tokoro.
