= Hiroshi Kondoh =

Hiroshi Kondoh is a computer engineer with Centellax, Inc. in Santa Rosa, California. He was named a Fellow of the Institute of Electrical and Electronics Engineers (IEEE) in 2015 for his contributions to microwave and millimeter wave MMIC technologies.
