= Juan S. Bonifacino =

American cell biologist

- Education: University of Buenos Aires
- Known for: Research on intracellular transport, protein sorting, endosomes, lysosomes, and adaptor protein complexes
- Scientific career
- Fields: Cell biology, biochemistry, molecular biology
- Workplaces: National Institutes of Health; Eunice Kennedy Shriver National Institute of Child Health and Human Development

Juan S. Bonifacino is an Argentinian-American cell biologist and biochemist. He is a National Institutes of Health (NIH) Distinguished Investigator and chief of the Section on Intracellular Protein Trafficking at the Eunice Kennedy Shriver National Institute of Child Health and Human Development (NICHD).

He was elected to the American Academy of Arts and Sciences and is a fellow of the American Association for the Advancement of Science and the American Society for Cell Biology.

== Education ==
Bonifacino earned a Ph.D. in biochemistry at the University of Buenos Aires in 1981.

== Career ==
Bonifacino was a predoctoral fellow of the National Scientific and Technical Research Council of Argentina from 1978 to 1982. He joined the National Institutes of Health (NIH) in 1982, as a postodoctoral fellow with Richard Klausner, first at the National Institute of Arthritis, Diabetes, Digestive and Kidney Diseases (NIDDK) and later at NICHD.

At NICHD, Bonifacino was a visiting associate from 1986 to 1991. He became visiting scientist and unit chief in 1991. In 1997, he was appointed senior investigator and chief of the Section on Intracellular Protein Trafficking.

From 1997 to 2007, Bonifacino served as chief of the Cell Biology and Metabolism Branch. He subsequently headed the Cell Biology and Metabolism Program until 2015.

From 2015 to 2023, Bonifacino was associate scientific director of NICHD's Neurosciences and Cellular and Structural Biology Division.

== Research ==
Bonifacino's research focuses on intracellular trafficking, particularly the mechanisms directing proteins and organelles to specific cellular compartments. His work covers protein sorting to endosomes, lysosomes, lysosome-related organelles such as melanosomes, and distinct plasma-membrane domains in polarized cells, including neurons. He has also investigated the positioning and transport of endosomes and lysosomes in neuronal and non-neuronal systems.

His research identified or characterized components of the protein and organelle trafficking machineries, including sorting signals, the AP-1, AP-2, AP-3, and AP-4 adaptor protein complexes, the GGA monomeric adaptor proteins, the GARP and EARP multisubunit tethering complexes, and the BORC lysosome regulator. His early studies addressed the assembly and quality control of the T-cell antigen receptor, protein degradation from the endoplasmic reticulum, and viral protein trafficking.

Additionally, his work links intracellular trafficking defects to human diseases, including Hermansky–Pudlak syndrome, AP-4 deficiency syndrome, hereditary spastic paraplegia, HIV-1 pathogenesis, and various neurodevelopmental and neurodegenerative disorders.

== Honors and awards ==
- 2009 – Sackler Lecturer, Tel Aviv University
- 2015 – IAS Distinguished Lecture, Hong Kong University of Science and Technology
- 2015 – Raíces Award for International Cooperation in Science, Ministry of Science of Argentina
- 2018 – Fellow of the American Society for Cell Biology
- 2018 – John Hughlings Jackson Lecture, McGill University
- 2019 – NIH Director’s Award
- 2019 – Peter Maloney Lecture, Johns Hopkins University School of Medicine
- 2022 – Keith Porter Lecture Award, American Society for Cell Biology
- 2023 – Oscar Orías Lecture
- 2024 – Named Distinguished Visitor to the National University of Córdoba, Argentina
- 2025 – Andrew Somlyo Honorary Lecture, University of Pennsylvania School of Medicine
- 2025 – Van Deenen Medal Award, Utrecht University
- 2025 – Joseph C. Calandra Lecture, Northwestern University Feinberg School of Medicine
- 2025 – Fellow of the American Association for the Advancement of Science
- 2026 – Member of the American Academy of Arts and Sciences
