= Hiroshi Fukuda =

Japanese weightlifter (born 1942)

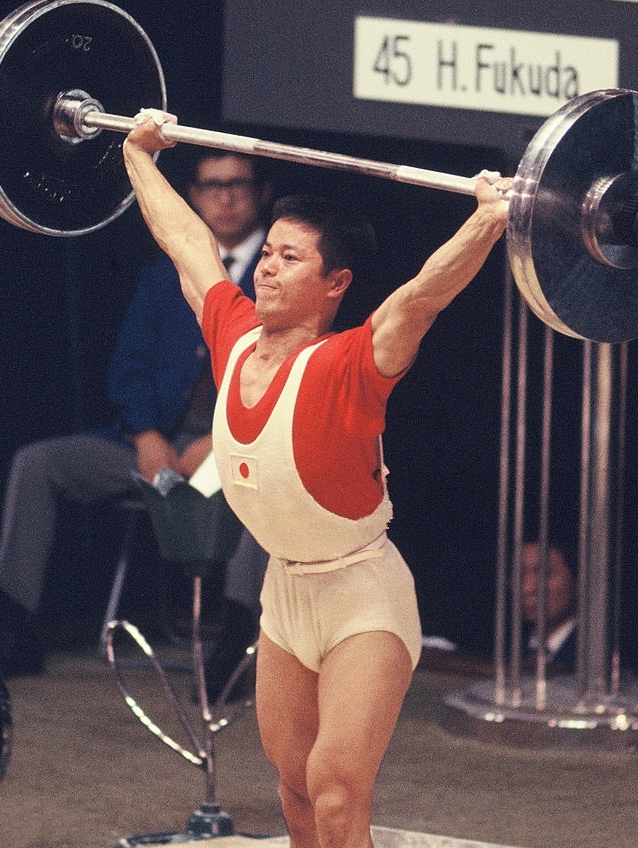
- Hiroshi Fukuda at the 1964 Olympics

Personal information
- Born: May 27, 1942 (age 84)
- Height: 1.57 m (5 ft 2 in)

Sport
- Sport: Weightlifting
Medal record
Representing Japan
World Championships
Silver medal – second place	1963 Stockholm	-56 kg

Hiroshi Fukuda (福田 弘, born May 27, 1942) is a retired Japanese weightlifter who won a silver medal at the 1963 World Championships. Next year he set a world record in the press and finished fourth at the 1964 Olympics.
