= Hiroshi Ono (photographer) =

Japanese photographer

Hiroshi Ono (小野 博, Ono Hiroshi; born 1971) is a Japanese photographer.

The Tokyo Photographic Art Museum holds several of his works.
