= Takeya Hiroshi =

Takeya Hiroshi (武谷 廣) was a professor and physician in Japan.

In 1910 he became the second professor of internal medicine section of Kyushu University, taking over from Naka Kin'ichi. In 1923, he firstly introduced the insulin suppression in diabetical regimen in Japan.

== Works ==
- 武谷 廣, 遠山 郁三1934『黴毒の診斷と治療』 診断と治療社(written in Japanese.)
- 武谷広, 勝木司馬之1940『黴毒ニ因スル神經系統疾患』(大日本内科全書; 第12巻, 第2冊 .神經系及運動器疾患; 第4編) (written in Japanese.)
