= Hiroshi Ōnishi =

Japanese painter and university professor

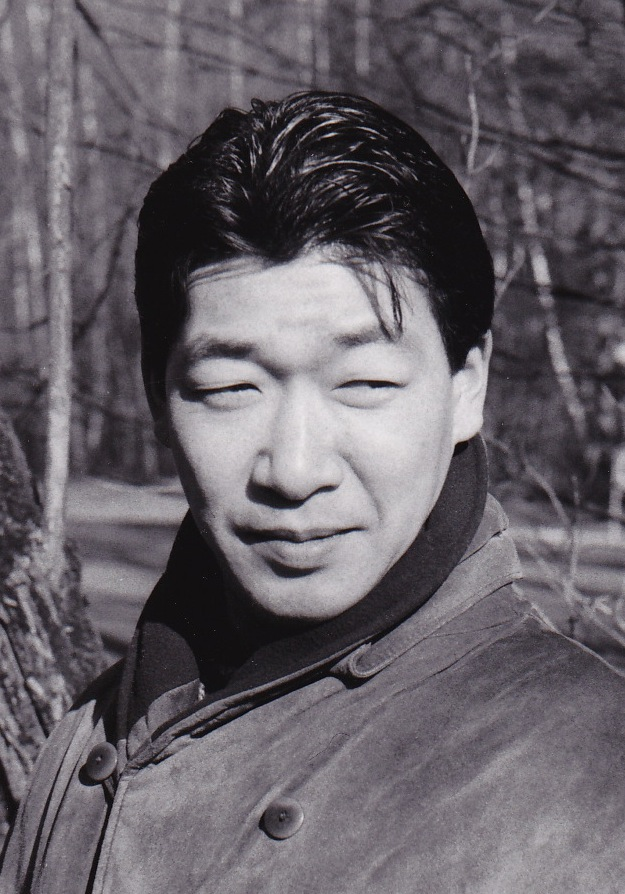
Hiroshi Ōnishi (1993)

Hiroshi Ōnishi (大西 博) (June 18, 1961 – March 31, 2011) was a Japanese painter and university professor.

== Life and work ==
=== Youth and early work ===
Born on June 18, 1961, on Shikoku Island, in Tokushima Prefecture, he grew up in Osaka from the age of three. Two significant incidents during his childhood awakened his interest in Western culture: the 1970 World's fair in Osaka, and the instructions in Western painting by the artist Kakuichi Shikawa. When he was 12, his family moved to Tokyo, where he passed the entrance examinations for the Tokyo University of the Arts (Tōkyō Geijutsu Daigaku) in 1983. In 1989 he completed his studies with a Masters in Art Theory, specializing in Oil Painting, Technique and Materials. His thesis work “La Truite” (“The Trout”, 1987) was purchased by the Japanese Ministry of Culture. His second work, “The Salmon”, 1989 by the Daiwa Bank. During this phase, he oriented his work strongly toward the European Renaissance, in which his human forms are evocative of Albrecht Dürer or Matthias Grünewald, in combination with his conceptions of fish and water. After his academic studies he worked for one year as a research assistant in the Department of Oil Painting, Technique and Materials.

=== Murals ===
In subsequent years he created more surreal and expressive oil paintings. Simultaneously, from 1983 to 1992, he worked as a muralist for the department store Shibuya PARCO in Tokyo. Later in his writings, he called this job Kaisha ni okeru katsudō (in English, “the establishment-concerned workings”). On surfaces of 4.5 x 13m, respectively, 4.5 x 9m, he painted advertisements for various products on the exterior walls of the department store. In the beginning he painted solo, later he engaged additional artists for these assignments.

=== Academic studies in Germany ===
From 1992 to 1997, Hiroshi Onishi studied at the Academy of Fine Arts in Nuremberg, Germany under Günter Dollhopf. In 1996 he was designated a Master Student. His experimentation with paper, acrylic, India ink, fabric and pigments became a quest for his Japanese roots.

=== Return to Japan and main work ===
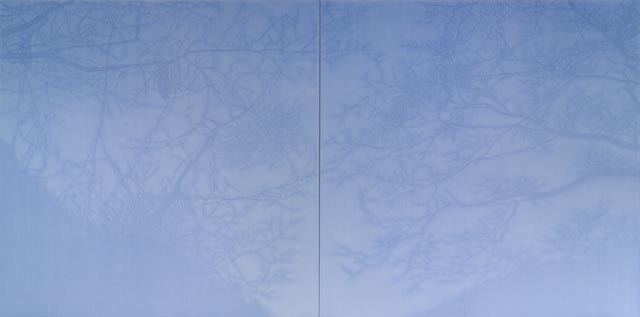
„View of Remembrance I“ (2009). 3,88 x 1,94 m, lapislazuli canvas

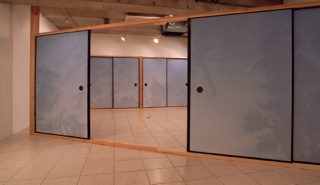
Fusuma-e for Nanzen-ji, Omotesando Gallery Exhibition, Tokyo, 2011

In February 1998 he returned to Japan, initially to work as an assistant professor, later as a professor, at his alma mater, Tokyo University of the Arts. In 2003, on assignment from the University, he undertook two trips to Afghanistan where he discovered the mineral lapis lazuli as a raw material for his work and rediscovered it as a pigment for traditional painting. This ultramarine pigment, created through an extremely complex process, he initially used for his painting and later for the creation of tea ceremony implements. Together with the Japanese company Holbein Ltd., he developed a premium quality lapis lazuli watercolor.

As Professor in the Department of Oil Painting, Technique and Material at the Tōkyō Geijutsu Daigaku he taught the traditional production of the lapis lazuli pigment in the tradition of Cennino Cennini from 1300 A.D.

Sensational exhibitions of this painting technique led to his most important and honored assignment: on the plot of a famous Zen Temple in Kyoto, the Nanzen-ji, he was to paint a hall in the Tenjuan Temple with his lapis lazuli technique. This work comprised 73 Fusuma-e (paintings on sliding doors). He was able to complete 12 Fusuma-e.

On March 31, 2011, he died in a boating accident on Lake Biwa, aged 49.

=== A retrospective of his work ===
From March 20 to April 8, 2012, the first show of his collective works took place posthumously on the campus of the Tōkyō Geijutsu Daigaku titled, “ONISHI HIROSHI Retrospective – View of Remembrance 大西博 回顧展 幻景“. Next to his many early works, oil paintings created using his lapis lazuli technique were also shown. In addition, the collection of tea ceremony utensils was presented for the first time. It consists of 30 ceremonial teacups fired with lapis lazuli pigment. Also included were accessories in bamboo and wood, which were lacquered with lapis lazuli pigment.

For Hiroshi Onishi the link between Eastern and Western painting was a central theme. A part of his work is now in Germany with his widow, Martina Wagner-Onishi.

== Exhibitions ==
=== Solo exhibitions ===
- 1989 Ginza Surugadai Gallery, Tokyo
- 1990 Ginza JBC Gallery, Tokyo
- 1994 Gold/Pfeil, Nuremberg
- 1998 Gallery Fukuyama, Tokyo
- 1999 Fuji Gallery, Osaka
- 2000 Yokohama Galeria Bellini Hill Gallery, Kanagawa
- 2002 Gallery Mori, Tokyo
- 2005 Gallery OPEN DOOR, Tokyo
- 2011 Gallery Omotesando, Tokyo
- 2012 The Chinretsukan Gallery, Tokyo University of the Arts, Tokyo

=== Group exhibitions (selection) ===
- 1987 Graduation Exhibition (BFA)
- 1989 Graduation Exhibition (MFA)
- 1993 Große Kunst Ausstellung, Haus der Kunst, Munich
- 1994 Siebold in Japan, Siebold-Stiftung, Würzburg
- 1996 Ausstellung der Dollhopf-Klasse, Schwabach
- 1997 From The Collection of The University Art Museum, Tokyo, Osaka, Kyoto, Nagoya
- 1999 At Center of Corridor, Yokohama Galeria Bellini Hill Gallery, Kanagawa; STOP OVER, Nuremberg Academy of Art, Nuremberg
- 2002 NEWS’, The University Art Museum, Tokyo
- 2003 Art Workshop School Exhibition, Myōkō, Akakura-Onsen, Niigata Prefecture
- 2004 Fuji Gallery and Teo Art Gallery; Japan-South Korea Exchange Exhibition, Busan, South Korea
- 2005 Reflex – Development and Construction of Contemporary Methods of Gold Leaf and Tempera – The University Art Museum, Tokyo; Coexistence in the Same Mind, Korean Craft Museum, Cheongju
- 2006 Three Histories, PICI Gallery, Seoul, South-Korea; The Legend of Minakami, Minakami Mizu Kiko Kan, Gunma Prefecture; Japan-South Korea Exchange Exhibition, Changwon Gallery, Changwon, South-Korea
- 2007 Artists’ Oil Color, The University Art Museum, Tokyo
- 2009 Layer/inner-sight, Galerie Omotesando, Tokyo; Asian Contemporary Art Drawings Exhibition, The University Art Museum, Tokyo
- 2010 ITSU-Japanese Painting Beyond Tradition, Hillside Forum, Tokyo; SOFA, Park Avenue Armory, New York City
- 2011 Galerie Omotesando, Tokyo; „SIX Esprits – from West“, Gallery EM, Nagasaki; „Tradition Present break up“ painting exhibition, The University Art Museum, Tokyo; „Homage to Akihiko Takami“, Galerie Omotesando, Tokyo
- 2013 Ceramic Class of Prof. Makoto Toyofuku, The University Art Museum, Tokyo
- 2014 „Seeing objects, painting objects“ Oil Painting, Department of Material and Techniques and other Artists, The University Art Museum, Tokyo

=== Tea ceremonies ===
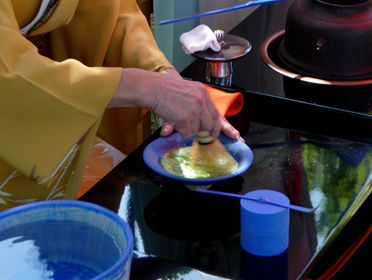
Tea Ceremony in Myōkō

On the occasion of the 120th Anniversary of the Tokyo University of the Arts, a four-day event „Geidai Chakai“ (tea convention of the Geidai) took place in October 2007. For this event, Hiroshi Onishi created multiple implements for tea ceremonies, among them the first teacup fired with a glaze of lapislazuli pigment. Additional public tea ceremonies followed.

- 2007 Tea Ceremony „Geidai Chakai“, The University Art Museum, Tokyo
- 2008–2010 Tea Ceremonies in Akakura-Onsen, Myōkō, Niigata Prefecture
- 2010 Tea Ceremony Matsuen-kai, Nezu Museum, Tokyo

== Literature ==
- GEIDAI CHAKAI (eds.: Geidai Chakai Executive Committee and Faculty of Fine Arts, Tokyo University of the Arts), 2008
- Ōnishi Hiroshi Retrospective – View of Remembrance. Exhibition Catalogue, Tokyo University of the Arts, 2012
- RURIKO Legende (eds.: Faculty of Fine Arts, University of the Arts), 2012
