= Hiroshi Ito =

Japanese voice actor

- Born: March 15, 1933 (age 93)
- Occupation: Voice actor
- Agent: 81 Produce

Hiroshi Ito (糸 博, Ito Hiroshi; born March 15, 1933 in Fukuoka, Japan) is a Japanese voice actor, employed by the talent management firm 81 Produce. He is best known for his role as Danzo Shimura in Naruto.

== Filmography ==
=== Television animation ===
- 1984: Bismark as Professor Charles Louvre
- 1991: Armored Police Metal Jack as Fujihara
- 1994: Montana Jones as Professor Giruto, Ambassador Soun
- 1997: Detective Conan as Genichiro Kaneshiro
- 1998: Alice SOS as Saboten Daimaoh
- 1998: Yu-Gi-Oh! as Chief Inspector
- 1999: Pokémon as Arujii
- 1999: Zoids: Chaotic Century as Zeppelin II, Gaas
- 2000: Tottoko Hamtaro as Old Man Roko
- 2001–2002: Captain Kuppa as Buritō
- 2002: Rockman EXE as Eldest Cutman
- 2003: Babar the Elephant as King Nōfan
- 2005: Starship Operators as President Rau
- 2007: Naruto Shippuden as Danzō Shimura
- 2010: Fullmetal Alchemist: Brotherhood as Gardner
- 2014: Barakamon as Kōsaku Kotoishi
- 2018: Ulysses: Jeanne d'Arc to Renkin no Kishi as Nicolas Flamel

=== OVA ===
- 1998: Legend of the Galactic Heroes as Klaus Von Lichtenlade
- 2005: FLCL as Shigekuni Nandaba

=== Movie ===
- 1986: Castle in the Sky as Mentor
- 2002: Atashin'chi as Gramps

=== Video games ===
- 1998: Psychic Force 2012 as Genshin Kanjō
- 1999: Ace Combat 3: Electrosphere as Gabriel W. Clarkson
- 1999: Shadow Hearts: Covenant as Zeppeto
- 1999: Psychic Force 2 as Genshin Kanjō
- 2002: Resident Evil Zero as James Marcus
- 2006: Final Fantasy XII as Archadian Senator
- 2012: Asura's Wrath as Chakravartin

=== Dubbing ===
Original year	Dub year	Title	Role	Original actor	Notes	Ref
1968		Once Upon a Time in the West	Manuel "Cheyenne" Gutiérrez	Jason Robards		
1972	2001	The Godfather	Captain McCluskey	Sterling Hayden		
1973		Tony Arzenta	Nick Gusto	Richard Conte		
1980		The Empire Strikes Back	General Carlist Rieekan	Bruce Boa		
1980	1996	The Shining	Lloyd	Joe Turkel		
1989–present		The Simpsons	Kent Brockman, Kirk Van Houten	Harry Shearer, Hank Azaria		
1982		The Shawshank Redemption	Prosecutor	Jeffrey DeMunn		
1993–1994		SWAT Kats: The Radical Squadron	Professor Hackle	George Hearn		
1987		The Running Man	Damon Killian	Richard Dawson		
1993		Striking Distance	Eddie Eiler	Brion James		
1994		Beverly Hills Cop III	Orrin Sanderson	John Saxon		
1995		Die Hard with a Vengeance	Dr. Fred Schiller, FBI Chief	Stephen Pearlman		
1995		The Scarlet Letter	Horace Stonehall	Robert Prosky		
1995	2003	Apollo 13	Walter Cronkite	Walter Cronkite		
1995		Mad Love	Richard Roberts	Jude Ciccolella		
1996		Basquiat	Bruno Bischofberger	Dennis Hopper		
1996		Chain Reaction	Ed Rafferty	Chelcie Ross		
1996		The Rock	Ernest Paxton	William Forsythe		
1996	1999	The Glimmer Man	Frank Deverell	Bob Gunton		
1997		Strategic Command	Vice President Charles Baker	Michael Cavanaugh		
1998		Rushmore	Dr. Nelson Guggenheim	Brian Cox		
1998		Hard Rain	Uncle Charlie	Ed Asner		
1998		Rush Hour	Thomas Griffin	Tom Wilkinson		
1999		The Green Mile	Warden Hal Moores	James Cromwell		
1999		The General's Daughter	General Campbell	James Cromwell		
1999		Atomic Train	President Fellwick	Edward Herrmann		
1999		The Haunting	Mr. Dudley	Bruce Dern		
1999		Never Been Kissed	Rigfort	Garry Marshall		
1999		The Ninth Gate	Victor Fargas	Jack Taylor		
2002		The Bourne Identity	Ward Abbott	Brian Cox		
2002	2007	John Q	Lt. Frank Grimes	Robert Duval		
2003	2003	The Haunted Mansion	Atticus Thorn	Corey Burton		
2004		The Bourne Supremacy	Ward Abbott	Brian Cox		
2004	2006	The Day After Tomorrow	Vice President Raymond Becker	Kenneth Welsh		
2004–2009		Battlestar Galactica	Colonel Saul Tigh	Michael Hogan		
2005		Kicking & Screaming	Buck Weston	Robert Duvall		
2006		The Flying Scotsman	Douglas Baxter	Brian Cox		
2007		Charlie Wilson's War	Pakistani President Zia-ul-Haq	Om Puri		
2007		Flight of Fury	General Tom Barnes	Angus MacInnes		
2007		Flood	British Prime Minister	Mike Tompson		
2007	2010	The Golden Compass	Master	Jack Shepherd		
2008	2012	The Dark Knight	Alfred Pennyworth	Michael Caine		
2008		Nights in Rodanthe	Robert Torrelson	Scott Glenn		
2009		Love Happens	Burke's father-in-law	Martin Sheen		
2009		G.I. Joe: The Rise of Cobra	U.S. President	Jonathan Pryce		
2010	2012	Inception	Prof. Stephen Miles	Michael Caine		
2010		The King's Speech	Cosmo Gordon Lang	Derek Jacobi		
2011		The Iron Lady	Denis Thatcher	Jim Broadbent		
2011		The Rite	Father Lucas Trevant	Anthony Hopkins		
2011		The Mechanic	Harry McKenna	Donald Sutherland		
2013		G.I. Joe: Retaliation	U.S. President, Zartan	Jonathan Pryce, Arnold Vosloo		
2015		And Then There Were None	Justice Lawrence Wargrave	Charles Dance		
2015		Bridge of Spies	Thomas Watters	Alan Alda		
2015		Cinderella	The King	Derek Jacobi		
2015		Forsaken	Reverend William Clayton	Donald Sutherland		
2015		Remember	Zev Guttman	Christopher Plummer		
2016		Now You See Me 2	Arthur Tressler	Michael Caine		
2016		Collide	Hagen Kahl	Anthony Hopkins		
2017		Going in Style	Albert Garner	Alan Arkin		
2017		The Other Side of Hope	Waldemar Wikström	Sakari Kuosmanen		
2017		Wonder	Mr. Tushman	Mandy Patinkin		
2018		Peter Rabbit	Mr. Joe McGregor	Sam Neill		
2019		Tolkien	Prof. Joseph Wright	Derek Jacobi		
2019		Dumbo	J. Griffin Remington	Alan Arkin		
2021		Judas and the Black Messiah	J. Edgar Hoover	Martin Sheen		
2022		The Fabelmans	John Ford	David Lynch		
Unknown		X-Men	Judge Biitorii			
