= Hiroshi Ogawa (cross-country skier) =

Japanese cross-country skier (born 1944)

Personal information
- Nationality: Japanese
- Born: 6 June 1944 (age 80); Niigata, Japan

Sport
- Sport: Cross-country skiing

Hiroshi Ogawa (小川 弘, Ogawa Hiroshi, born 6 June 1944) is a Japanese cross-country skier. He competed in the men's 15 kilometre event at the 1968 Winter Olympics.
