= Hiroshi Ogawa (pitcher) =

Japanese baseball player (born 1962)

- Pitcher
- Born: April 2, 1962 (age 64); Ashikaga, Tochigi, Japan
- Batted: Right Threw: Right

NPB debut
- April 10, 1985, for the Lotte Orions

Last NPB appearance
- October 6, 1990, for the Lotte Orions

NPB statistics
- Win–loss record: 21–26
- Earned run average: 4.12
- Strikeouts: 460
- Stats at Baseball Reference

Teams
- Lotte Orions (1985–1990)

Hiroshi Ogawa (小川 博, Ogawa Hiroshi; born April 2, 1962) is a Japanese former professional baseball pitcher. He pitched in Nippon Professional Baseball for the Lotte Orions. In 2004, he was convicted of murder.

On November 18, 2004, Ogawa murdered a 67-year-old woman named Kazuko Nishiuchi. His uniform number, 26, has been retired since 2005. On September 29, 2005, he was sentenced to life imprisonment at the Saitama District Court.
