= Hiroshi Ogawa (second baseman) =

Japanese baseball player (born 1940)

- Second baseman
- Born: January 25, 1940 (age 86); Kanagawa, Japan
- Bats: Right Throws: Right

Teams
- Hankyu Braves (1963, 1965)

Hiroshi Ogawa (小川博, Ogawa Hiroshi; born January 25, 1940) is a former Japanese Nippon Professional Baseball shortstop. He played for the Hankyu Braves in 1963 and 1965.
