= Hiroshi Ogawa (shortstop) =

Japanese baseball player and coach (born 1960)

- Shortstop / Coach / Manager
- Born: June 6, 1960 (age 65); Ichikawa, Chiba, Japan
- Batted: Right Threw: Right

NPB debut
- August 2, 1980, for the Seibu Lions

Last NPB appearance
- September 24, 1995, for the Fukuoka Daiei Hawks

NPB statistics (through 1996)
- Batting average: .237
- Home runs: 11
- Hits: 469
- Stats at Baseball Reference

Teams
- As player: Seibu Lions (1979–1982); Nankai Hawks/Fukuoka Daiei Hawks (1983–1996); As coach: Fukuoka Daiei Hawks (2000–2001); Orix BlueWave (2003–2004); Fukuoka SoftBank Hawks (2011–2017, 2022–2024)
- Last updated on: 3 December 2024

Hiroshi Ogawa (小川 史, Ogawa Hiroshi; born June 6, 1960) is a former Japanese Nippon Professional Baseball shortstop, and current the third squad manager for the Fukuoka SoftBank Hawks of Nippon Professional Baseball (NPB).

He played for the Seibu Lions in 1980, and the Nankai Hawks/Fukuoka Daiei Hawks from 1983 to 1995.

== Professional career ==
=== Active player era ===
Ogawa joined the Seibu Lions without going through the draft in 1978. In 1980 season, he made his Pacific League debut and played in seven games.

He was traded to the Nankai Hawks in a money trade during the 1982 season.

In the 1986 season, He was a regular at shortstop and reached the regulation plate appearance. He then became a defensive expert who could play both infield and outfield, retiring in 1996.

Ogawa played in 1006 games during his 18-season career, batting average .237 with 469 hits, 11 home runs, and 155 RBI.

=== After retirement ===
After his retirement, Ogawa served three years in the front office of the Fukuoka Daiei Hawks before serving as the Hawks' second squad infield defense and base coach from the 2000 to 2001 seasons.

He also served as the Orix BlueWave's second squad infield defense and base coach from the 2003 to 2004 seasons.

He served as a scout for the Tohoku Rakuten Golden Eagles from 2009 to 2010 after working in the front office of the Fukuoka Softbank Hawks in organization management.

In 2011 season, Ogawa became the Fukuoka SoftBank Hawks third squad manager and in 2014 served as the first squad head coach, helping his team win the Japan Series championship.

From the 2015 season he was again the third second manager and from the 2016 season he was the second squad infield defense and base coach.

In 2017 season, he became a professional baseball player scout and was appointed for the third time to the position of third squad manager for the 2022 season.

He will serve as the forth squad manager beginning with the 2023 season.

On December 2, 2023, he was transferred to the third squad manager.
