= Hiroshi Ono (scholar) =

Japanese literary scholar

Hiroshi Ono (小野寛 Ono Hiroshi) is a Japanese literary scholar, known for his work on the Man'yōshū.

== Life ==
Ono was born in Kyoto in 1934. He received his BA and MA in literature from the University of Tokyo.

After working as a professor at Gakushūin Women's Junior College, in 1980 he became a professor at Komazawa University. He retired from Komazawa in March 2004, and became president of the Takaoka Manyou Historical Museum in April.

He served as executive director of the Association for Early Japanese Literature from 1971 to 2005, acting as the association's president from 1989 to 1990. He served as an adviser to the association from 2005.
