= Hiroshi Inomata =

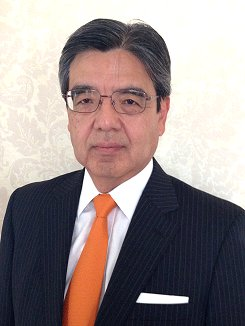
Hiroshi Inomata

Hiroshi Inomata (猪俣 弘司, Inomata Hiroshi) is a Japanese diplomat and Japan's current ambassador to The Netherlands, after a previous mission in Pakistan.

== Overview ==
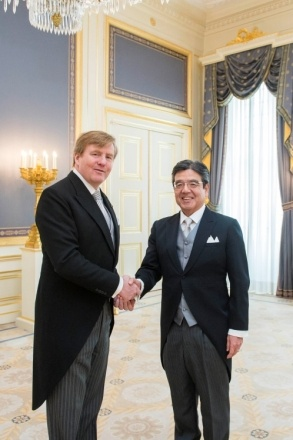
Inomata with King Willem-Alexander at Noordeinde Palace on March 23, 2016.

Inomata graduated from Waseda University in 1978 and started his professional career the same year. In 2010, he served as Consul-General of Japan at San Francisco.
