= 1928 in Japan =

- Decades: 1900s; 1910s; 1920s; 1930s; 1940s
- See also: Other events of 1928; History of Japan; Timeline; Years

Events in the year 1928 in Japan. It corresponds to Shōwa 3 (昭和3年) in the Japanese calendar.

== Incumbents ==
- Emperor: Hirohito
- Prime Minister: Tanaka Giichi

=== Governors ===
- Aichi Prefecture: Toyoji Obata
- Akita Prefecture: Yuichiro Chikaraishi (until 28 February); Iwao Koinuma (starting 28 February)
- Aomori Prefecture: Tetsuzo Yoshimura
- Ehime Prefecture: Yujiro Ozaki (until 25 May); Keizo Ichimura (starting 25 May)
- Fukui Prefecture: Keizo Ichimura (until 25 May); Joko Obama (starting 25 May)
- Fukuoka Prefecture: Saito Morikuni
- Fukushima Prefecture: Ito Kihachiro (until 25 May); Aid Kiyoo (starting 25 May)
- Gifu Prefecture: Rokuichiro Ono (until 25 May); Masao Kanazawa (starting 25 May)
- Gunma Prefecture: Agata Shinobu (until 10 January); Omori Keiichi (starting 10 January)
- Hiroshima Prefecture: Sukenari Yokoyama (until 25 May); Masao Kishimoto (starting 25 May)
- Ibaraki Prefecture: Jiro Morioka
- Ishikawa Prefecture: vacant
- Iwate Prefecture:
  - until 11 January: Kakichi Tokuno
  - 11 January-26 December: Fujihira Marumo
  - starting 26 December: Tojiro Io
- Kagawa Prefecture: Toshio Motoda
- Kanagawa Prefecture: Ikeda Hiroshi
- Kochi Prefecture: Aidkame Kiyoo (until 25 May); Ichiro Oshima (starting 25 May)
- Kumamoto Prefecture: Saito Munenori
- Kyoto Prefecture: Shigeyoshi Omihara
- Mie Prefecture: Endo Ryusaku (until 28 February); Iori Hanada (starting 28 February)
- Miyagi Prefecture: Katorataro Ushizu
- Miyazaki Prefecture: Akira Kouda (until 10 January); Kunitoshi Yamaoka (starting 10 January)
- Nagano Prefecture: Ryo Chiba
- Niigata Prefecture:
  - until 28 February: Shohei Fujinoma
  - 28 February-28 May: Yuichiro Chikaraishi
  - starting 25 May: Ozaki Yujiro
- Okayama Prefecture: Masao Kishimoto
- Okinawa Prefecture: Tōjirō Iio (until 26 December); Chōhei Hosokawa (starting 26 December)
- Osaka Prefecture: Harumichi Tanabe (until month unknown); Yūichirō Chikaraishi (starting month unknown)
- Saitama Prefecture: Chohei Hosokawa
- Shiname Prefecture: Rinsaku Yagi
- Tochigi Prefecture: Takeichi Fujiyama
- Tokyo: Hiroshi Hiratsuka
- Toyama Prefecture: Shirane Takesuke
- Yamagata Prefecture: Shinohara Eitaro

== Events ==
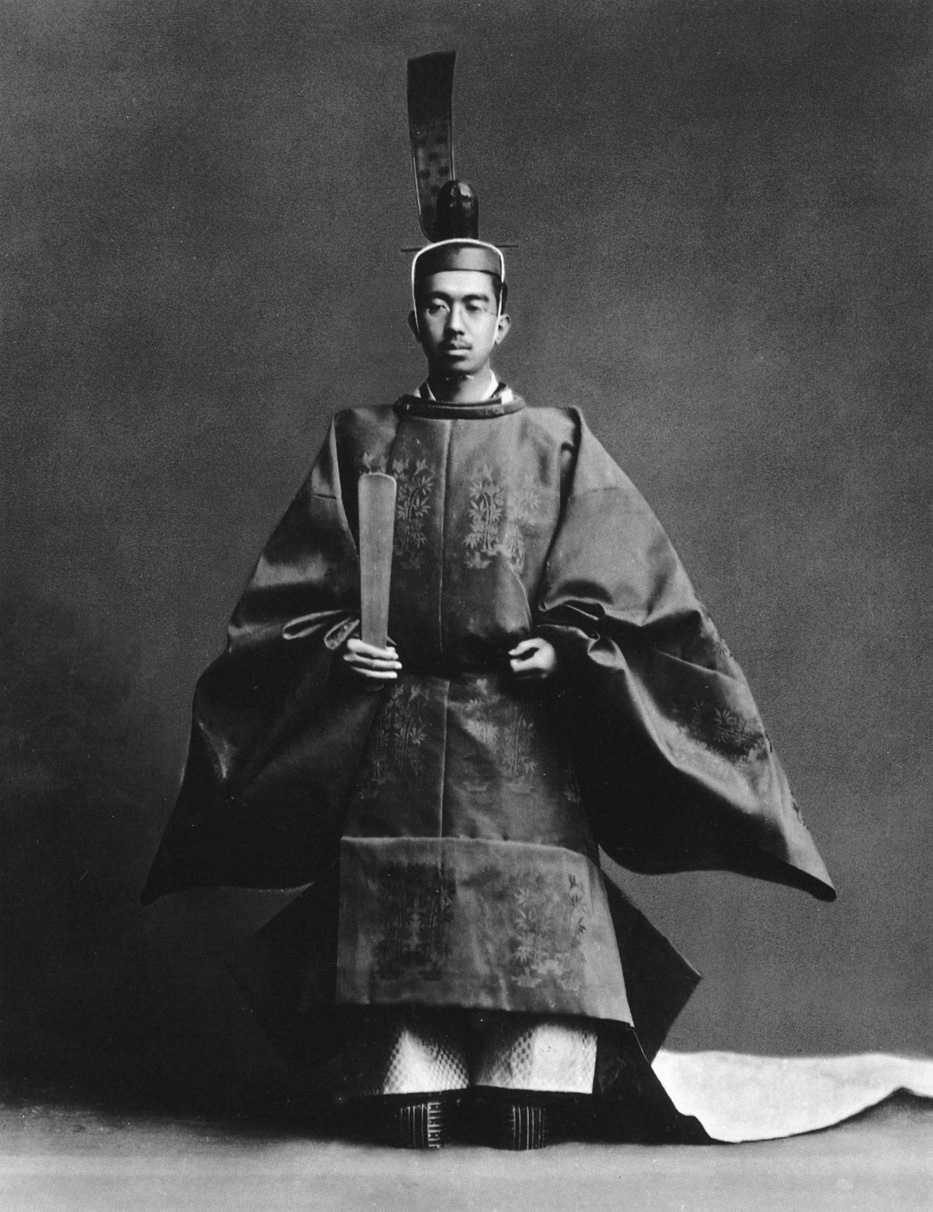
Emperor Hirohito after his enthronement ceremony in 1928, dressed in sokutai

- February 11–19 – Japan competes in the 1928 Winter Olympics in St. Moritz, Switzerland, the first true Winter Olympics held on its own and not in conjunction with a Summer Olympics.
- February 20 – 1928 Japanese general election: The first general election after the introduction of universal male suffrage was passed in 1925. The ruling Rikken Seiyūkai led by Prime Minister Tanaka Giichi won one more seat than the opposition Rikken Minseitō led by Hamaguchi Osachi, although Rikken Minseitō had received slightly more votes. The hung parliament led to the Tanaka government continuing in office.
- March 15 – March 15 incident: Alarmed by gains made by socialists and communists in the 1928 general election, the conservative government of Prime Minister Giichi Tanaka ordered the mass arrest of known communists and socialists and suspected communist and socialist sympathizers. The arrests occurred throughout Japan, and a total of 1652 people were apprehended.
- May 3 – Jinan Incident: an armed conflict between the Japanese Imperial Army allied with Northern Chinese warlords against the Kuomintang's southern army, occurs in Jinan, eastern China.
- June 4 – Huanggutun Incident: Chinese warlord Zhang Zuolin is killed by low-ranking officer in the Japanese Kwantung Army when a bomb his personal train is travelling over explodes. Emperor Hirohito harshly criticized the event and eventually dismissed Prime Minister Tanaka Giichi for his inability to arrest and prosecute the plotters of the incident.
- July 28–August 12 – Japan competes in the ninth Summer Olympics held in Amsterdam, Netherlands. For the 1928 Olympics, Japan won 2 golds, 2 silvers and 1 bronze.
- September 28 – Prince Chichibu marries Matsudaira Setsuko.
- November 10 – Enthronement of Hirohito as Emperor of Japan in the Imperial Palace in Kyoto.
- December 21 – Fujikoshi Steel Industry, later Nachi-Fujikoshi founded in Toyama City.
- Unknown date – A food processing Ito Meat Packer was founded, as predecessor of Itoham-Yonekyu in Nishinomiya, Hyogo Prefecture.

== Births ==
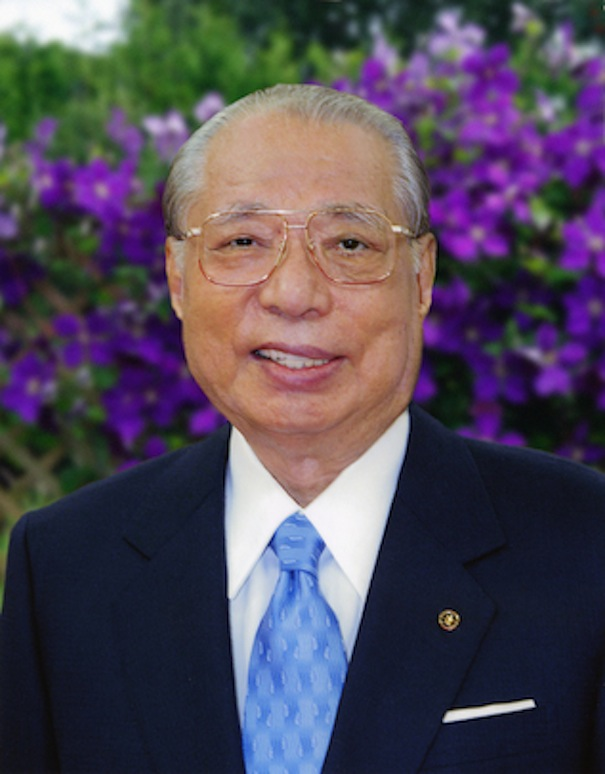
Daisaku Ikeda, Japanese religious leader

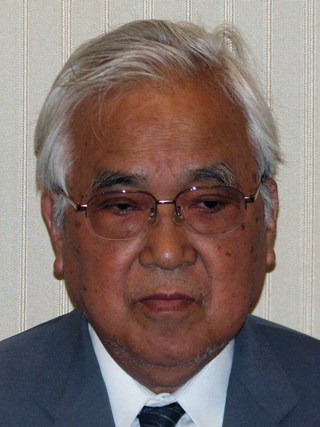
Yoshihide Kozai, Japanese astronomer

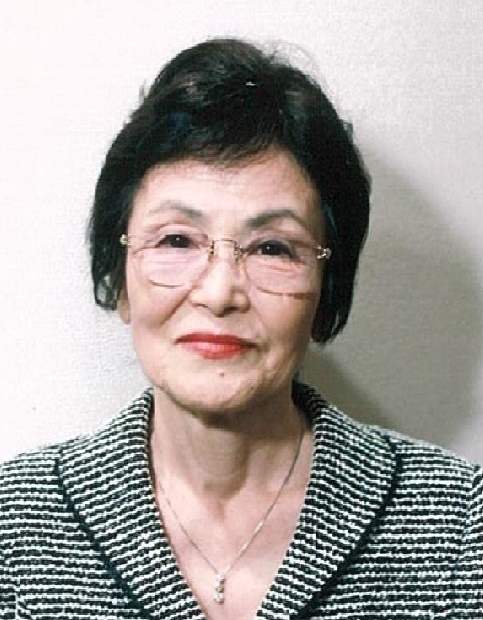
Setsuko Tsumura, Akutagawa Prize-winning Japanese writer

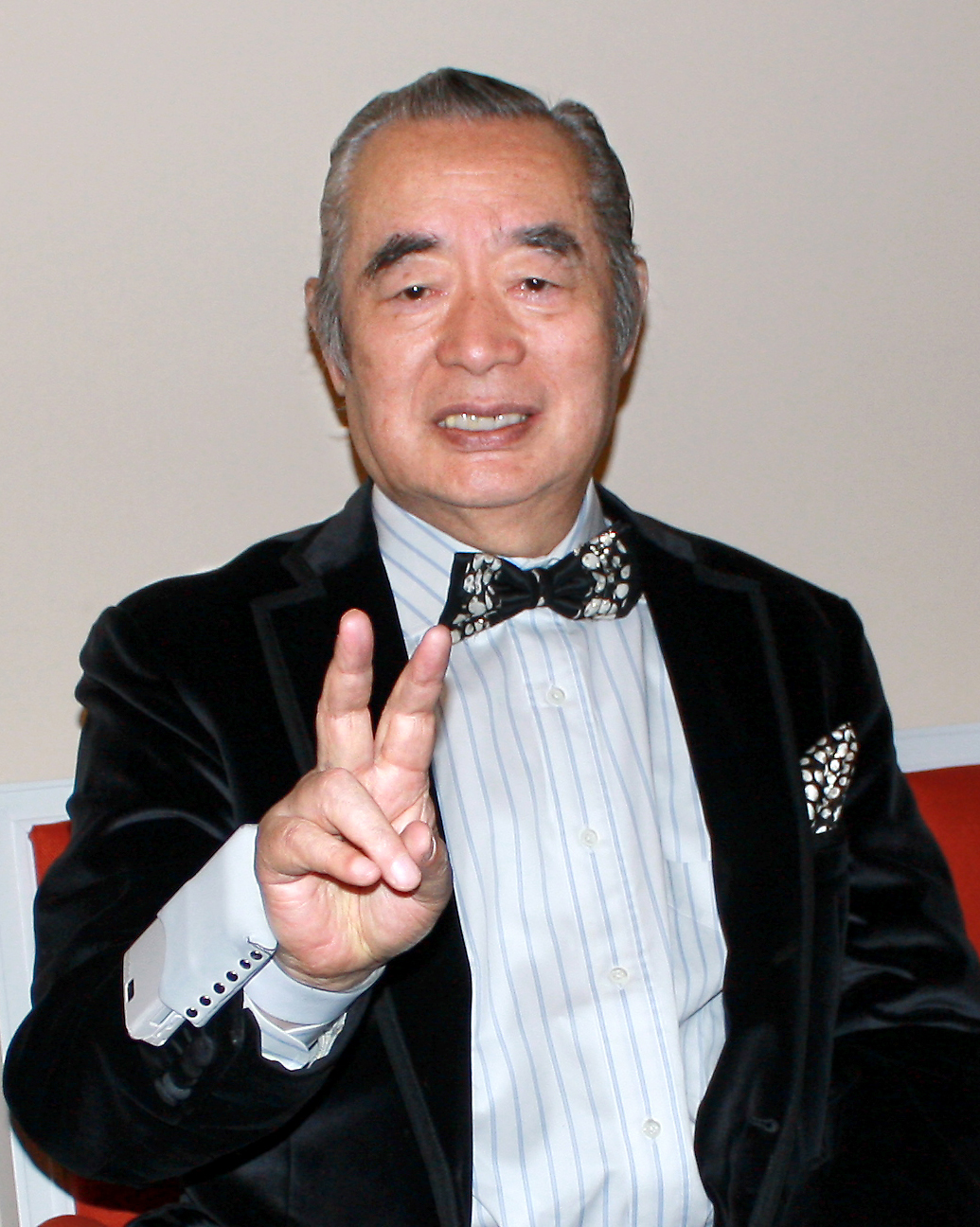
Yoshiro Nakamatsu, Japanese inventor

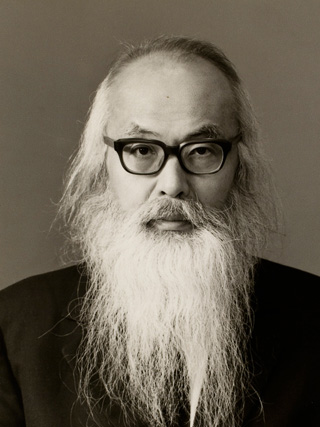
Hirofumi Uzawa, Japanese economist

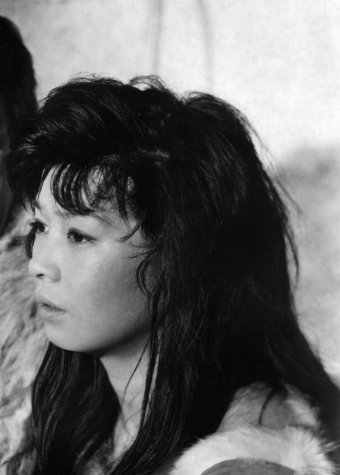
Yoko Tani, French-born Japanese actress

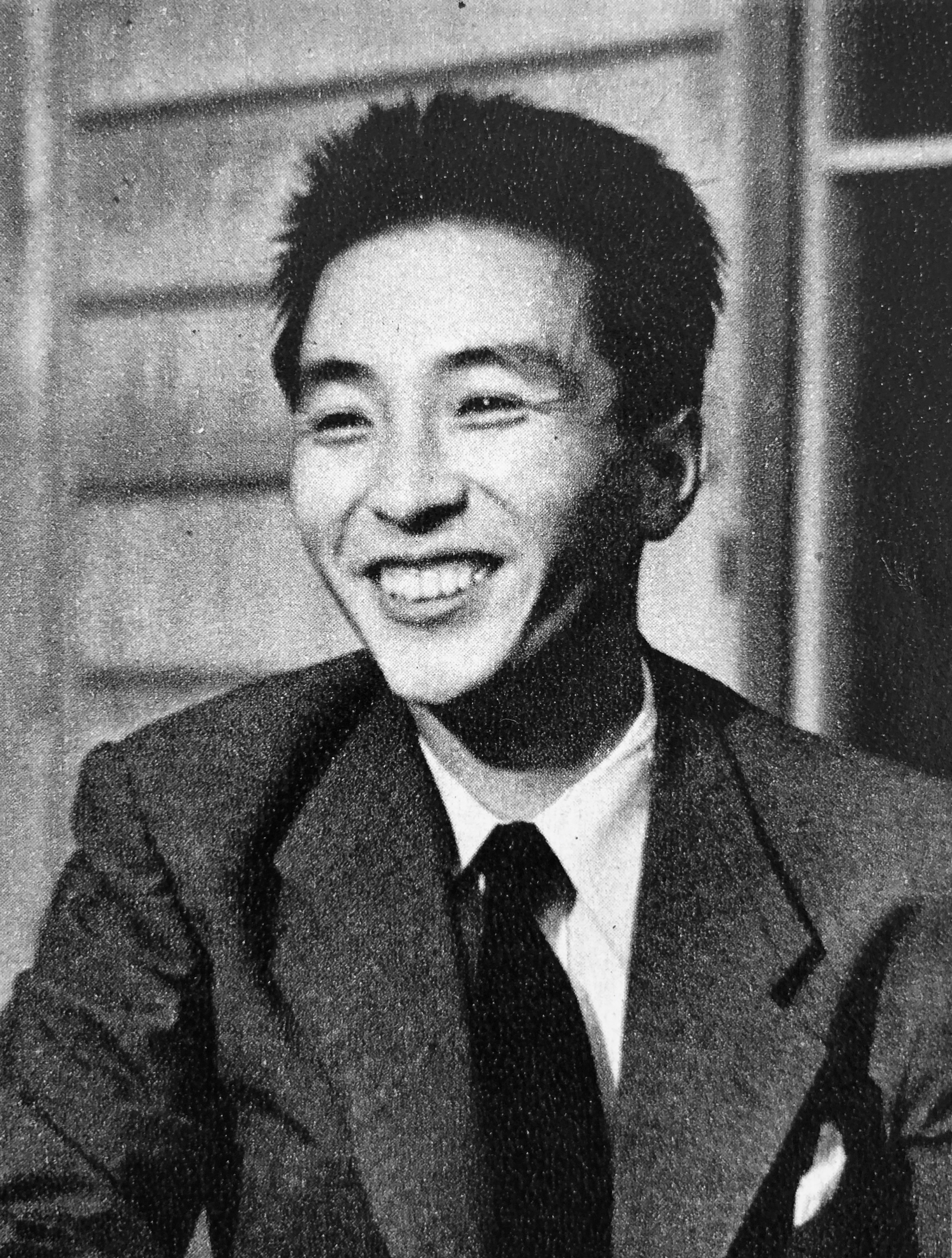
Takahiro Tamura, Japanese film actor

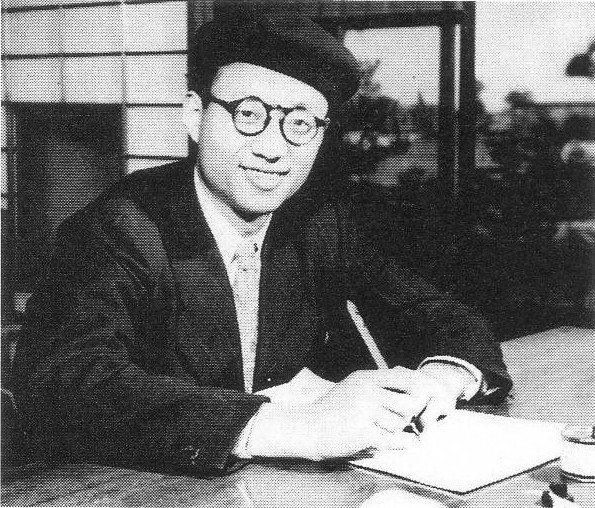
Osamu Tezuka, Japanese manga artist, cartoonist, animator, director, and producer

=== January–March ===
- January 1
  - Kazuo Kato, actor and voice actor
  - Masatoshi Yoshino, geographer, climatologist (d. 2017)
- January 2
  - Daisaku Ikeda, religious leader
  - Tamio Oki, voice actor (d. 2017)
- January 3
  - Hiroshi Hasegawa, actor
  - Toshiko Okanoue, artist
- January 14 – Shôki Fukae, actor (d. 2015)
- January 22 – Yoshihiko Amino, historian (d. 2004)
- January 29 – Akira Miyawaki, botanist (d. 2021)
- February 1 – Susumu Ohno, Japanese-American geneticist and evolutionary biologist, and seminal researcher (d. 2000)
- February 4 – Yugo Sako, director, producer, and screenwriter (d. 2012)
- February 20 – Mitsuyo Asaka, actress (d. 2020)
- February 22 – Tatsuo Miyao, cross-country skier (d. 2015)
- March 5 – Katsuaki Matsumoto, professional track racing cyclist (d. 2021)
- March 9 – Tatsumi Hijikata, choreographer, (d. 1986)
- March 10 – Kiyoshi Atsumi, actor (d. 1996)
- March 11 – Nakamura Shikan VII, kabuki performer (d. 2011)
- March 16 – Wakanohana Kanji I, sumo wrestler (d. 2010)
- March 27
  - Ryuji Saikachi, actor and voice actor (d. 2017)
  - Seiko Tanabe, author (d. 2019)
- March 31 – Morihiro Saito, martial art of aikido teacher (d. 2002)

=== April–June ===
- April 1 – Yoshihide Kozai, astronomer (d. 2018)
- April 13 – Toshiyuki Tanaka, artist (d. 2006)
- April 18 – Mikio Sato, mathematician (d. 2023)
- April 22 – Katsuhiro Yamaguchi, artist (d. 2018)
- May 6 – Shizuka Narahara, former table tennis player
- May 8 – Tatsuhiko Shibusawa, writer, art critic, and translator (d. 1987)
- May 16 – Hiroshi Nakajima, physician and former director-general of World Health Organization (d. 2013)
- May 22 – Kimiko Nishimoto, Brazilian-born Japanese photographer (b. 2025)
- June 5 – Setsuko Tsumura, writer
- June 14 – Yōko Abe, mother of former Japanese Prime Minister Shinzo Abe (d. 2024)
- June 23 – Hayao Kawai, psychologist (d. 2007)
- June 26 – Yoshiro Nakamatsu, inventor

=== July–September ===
- July 10 – Kiyotaka Takabayashi, former speed skater
- July 11 – Harue Kitamura, politician, lawyer, and feminist (d. 2022)
- July 12 – Shimako Murai, playwright and Hiroshima bombing survivor (d. 2018)
- July 21 – Hirofumi Uzawa, economist (d. 2014)
- July 30 – Chû Arai, actor and comedian (d. 2000)
- August 2 – Yoko Tani, French-born Japanese actress (d. 1999)
- August 15 – Suzushi Hanayagi, dancer and choreographer (d. 2010)
- August 16 – Shōji Yasui, actor (d. 2014)
- August 27 – Osamu Shimomura, Nobel Prize-winning chemist and marine biologist (d. 2018)
- August 31 – Takahiro Tamura, film actor (d. 2006)
- September 6 – Fumihiko Maki, architect
- September 12 – Mizuki Yamada, Olympic sailor (d. 2008)
- September 16 – Hironoshin Furuhashi, former swimmer and chairman of Japan Olympic Committee (d. 2009)
- September 20 – Shiro Hashizume, Olympic swimmer (d. 2023)
- September 30 – Takeshi Inoue, footballer (d. 1992)

=== October–December ===
- October 1 – Kôhei Tsuzaki, actor and director (d. 1995)
- October 10
  - Hidetaka Nishiyama, karateka (d. 2008)
  - Susumu Hani, film director
- October 28 – Yōko Sugi, actress (d. 2019)
- November 3
  - Goseki Kojima, manga artist (d. 2000)
  - Osamu Tezuka, manga artist, cartoonist, animator, director, and producer (d. 1989)
- November 23 – Hikaru Matsunaga, politician (d. 2022)
- November 27 – Bernard Ryosuke Inagaki, philosopher (d. 2022)
- November 30 – Takako Doi, politician (Speakers of the House) (d. 2014)
- December 4 – Renji Suzuki, politician and former Governor of Aichi Prefecture (d. 2022)
- December 7 – Hiroshi Fujita, mathematician
- December 8 – Kiyozō Kazama, professor of comparative linguistics
- December 11 – Noriaki Tsuchimoto, documentary film director (d. 2008)
- December 27 – Kōji Taki, critic, photographer and philosopher (d. 2011)

== Deaths ==
- February 17 – Ōtsuki Fumihiko, lexicographer, linguist, and historian (b. 1847)
- March 8 – Sachiko, Princess Hisa, second child of Emperor Shōwa (b. 1927)
- April 5 – Okura Kihachiro, entrepreneur (b. 1837)
- May 4 – Jinzō Matsumura, botanist (b. 1856)
- May 21 – Hideyo Noguchi, bacteriologist (b. 1876)
- July 23 – Zenzō Kasai, novelist (b. 1887)
- October 25 – Hirotsu Ryurō, novelist (b. 1861)
- November 3 – Uryū Shigeko, educator (b. 1862)
- December 25 – Kaoru Osanai, theater director, playwright, and actor (b. 1881)

== See also ==
- 1928 in Japanese football
- List of Japanese films of the 1920s
