= 1929 in Japan =

- Decades: 1900s; 1910s; 1920s; 1930s; 1940s
- See also: Other events of 1929; History of Japan • Timeline • Years

Events in the year 1929 in Japan. It corresponds to Shōwa 4 (昭和4年) in the Japanese calendar.

== Incumbents ==
- Emperor: Hirohito
- Prime Minister:
  - Tanaka Giichi: until July 2
  - Osachi Hamaguchi: from July 2

=== Governors ===
- Aichi Prefecture: Toyoji Obata (until 5 July); Masao Oka (starting 5 July)
- Akita Prefecture: Iwao Koinuma (until 5 January); Shinji Kikuchi (starting 5 January)
- Aomori Prefecture:
  - until 30 January: Tetsuzo Yoshimura
  - 30 January-5 July: Yujiro Shinjo
  - starting 5 July: Mitsuo Hirai
- Ehime Prefecture: Keizo Ichimura (until 8 November); Shin Kinoshita (starting 8 November)
- Fukui Prefecture: Joko Obama
- Fukuoka Prefecture: Saito Morikuni (starting month unknown)
- Fukushima Prefecture: Aid Kiyoo (until 5 July); Koyanagi Makimamoru (starting 5 July)
- Gifu Prefecture: Masao Kanazawa (until 5 July); Ken Usawa (starting 5 July)
- Gunma Prefecture: Omori Keiichi (until 10 September); Hotta Kanae (starting 10 September)
- Hiroshima Prefecture: Masao Kishimoto (until 5 July); Hiroshi Kawabuchi (starting 5 July)
- Ibaraki Prefecture: Jiro Morioka (until 5 July); Shozo Ushijima (starting 5 July)
- Ishikawa Prefecture: Nakano Kunikazu (starting month unknown)
- Iwate Prefecture: Tojiro Io (until 5 July); Shichiro Niwa (starting 5 July)
- Kagawa Prefecture: Toshio Motoda (until 5 July); Susumu Tsuboi (starting 5 July)
- Kanagawa Prefecture: Ikeda Hiroshi (until month unknown); Jiro Yamagata (starting month unknown)
- Kochi Prefecture: Ichiro Oshima (until 5 July); Tanaka (starting 5 July)
- Kumamoto Prefecture: Saito Munenori (until month unknown); Omori Kichigoro (starting month unknown)
- Kyoto Prefecture: Shigeyoshi Omihara (until July); Shinichi Sagami (starting July)
- Mie Prefecture: Iori Hanada (until 8 November); Keizo Ichimura (starting 8 November)
- Miyagi Prefecture: Katorataro Ushizu (until 9 October); Michio Yuzawa (starting 9 October)
- Miyazaki Prefecture: Kunitoshi Yamaoka (until 5 July); Kaoru Ishida (starting 5 July)
- Nagano Prefecture: Ryo Chiba (until 5 July); Shintaro Suzuki (starting 5 July)
- Niigata Prefecture: Ozaki Yujiro (until 5 July); Takeo Mimatsu (starting 5 July)
- Okayama Prefecture: Masao Kishimoto (until month unknown); Minabe Choji (starting month unknown)
- Okinawa Prefecture: Chōhei Hosokawa (until 5 July); Masao Moriya (starting 5 July)
- Osaka Prefecture: Yuichiro Chikaraishi
- Saitama Prefecture:
  - until 6 February: Miyawaki Umekichi
  - 6 February-5 July: Shirane Takekai
  - starting 5 July: Chohei Hosokawa
- Shiname Prefecture: Rinsaku Yagi
- Tochigi Prefecture:
  - until 5 July: Takeichi Fujiyama
  - 5 July-8 November: Jiro Morioka
  - starting 8 November: Harada
- Tokyo:
  - until 9 October: Hiroshi Hiratsuka
  - 5 July-9 October: Kenzo Kakagawa
  - starting 9 October: Torataro Shizuka
- Toyama Prefecture: Shirane Takesuke (until 8 February); Kozo Yamanaka (starting 8 February)
- Yamagata Prefecture: Shinohara Eitaro (until 9 October); Kubota Osamu Kosuke (starting 9 October)

== Events ==
- January 27 – An auto parts brand, Akebono Brake was founded, as predecessor name of Akebono Asbest Manufacturing.
- April 1 – openings of Kugenuma-Kaigan Station, Satte Station and Tochigi Station
- April 15 – Hankyu Department Store Osaka Umeda officially open in Kita-ku, Osaka.
- October 1 – opening of Tōbu-Nikkō Station
- November 17 – opening of Iwatsuki Station
- December 15 – opening of Bungo-Mori Station
- opening of the Beppu Rakutenchi Cable Line
- founded of Pola Orbis, as predecessor name was Pola Chemical Industries in Shizuoka City.

== Films ==
- Akeyuku Sora
- Days of Youth
- Sakanaya Honda

== Births ==
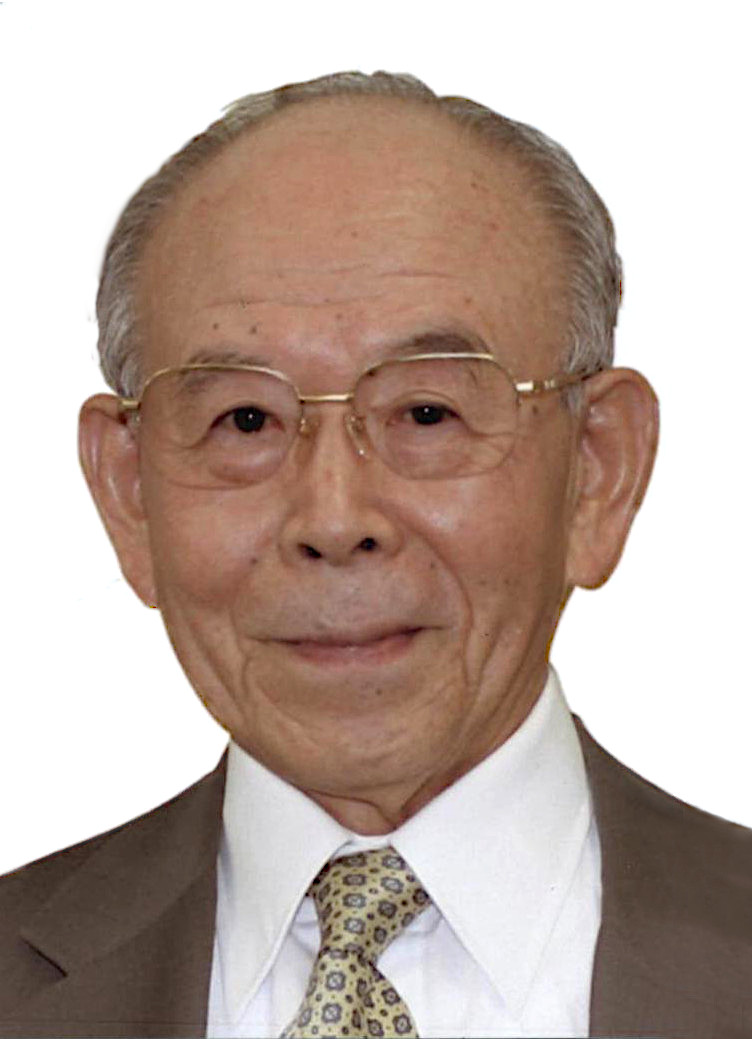
Isamu Akasaki, Isamu Akasaki, Nobel Prize-winning Japanese physicist and engineer

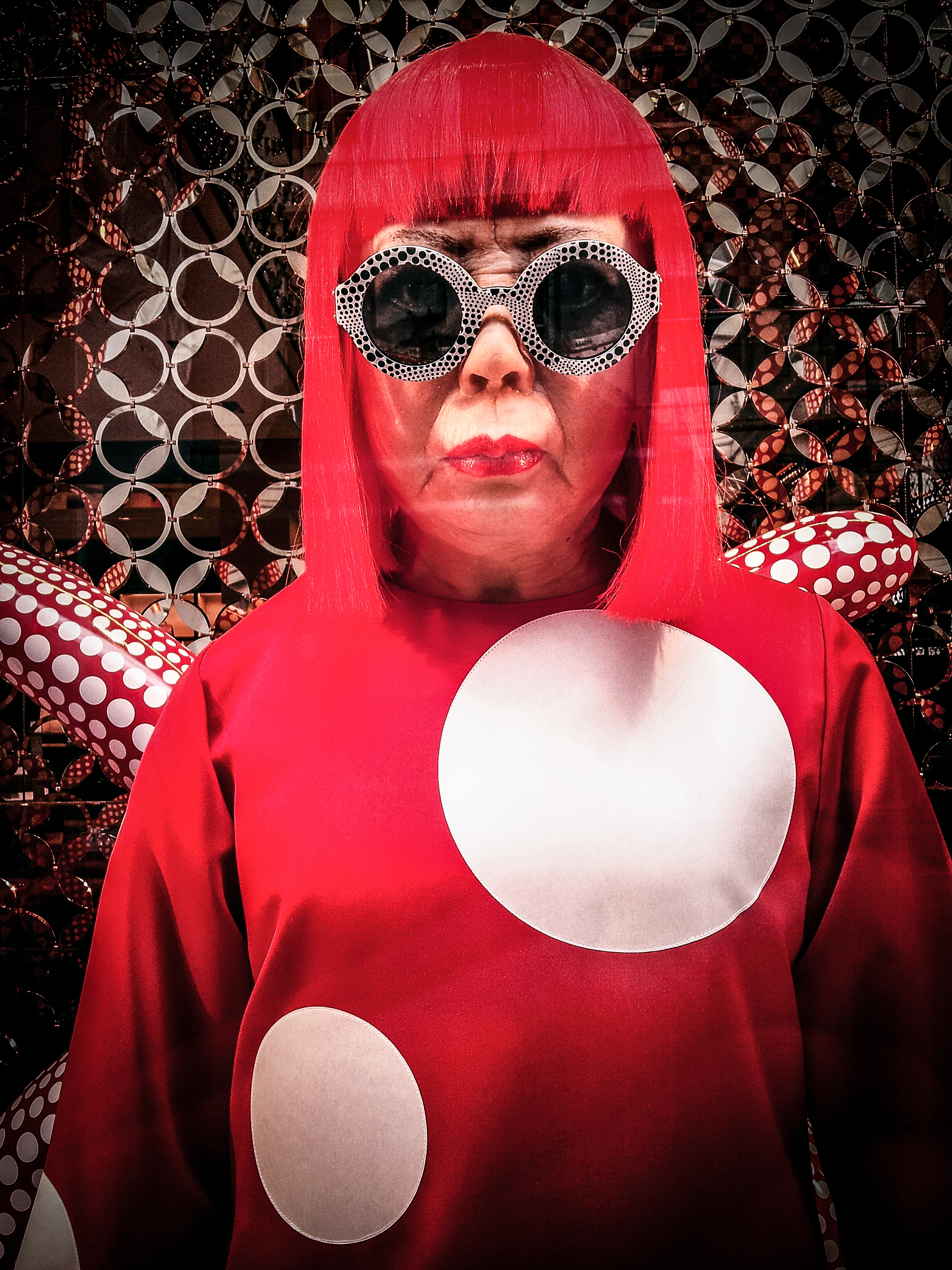
Yayoi Kusama, Japanese visual artist

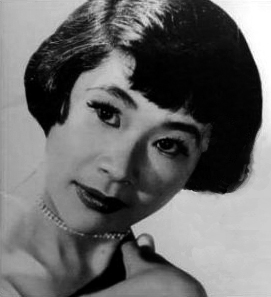
Miyoshi Umeki, Japanese actress

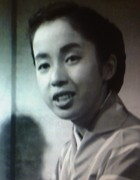
Tomoko Naraoka, Japanese actress, voice actress, and narrator

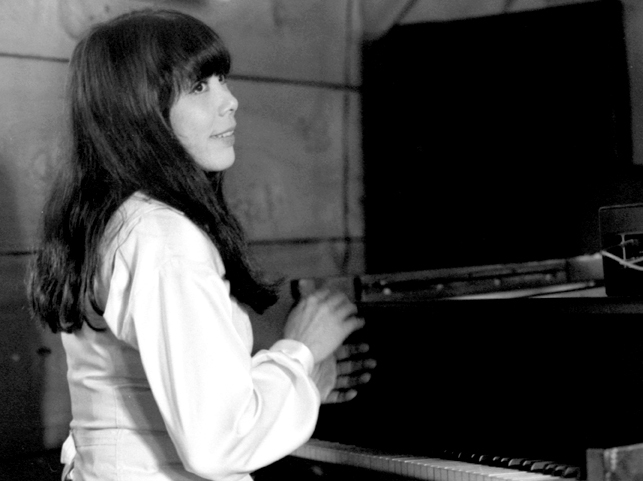
Toshiko Akiyoshi, Japanese jazz musician, composer/arranger, pianist, and bandleader

=== January–March ===
- January 1
  - Akihiko Okamura, photographer (d. 1985)
  - Haruo Nakajima, actor, stuntman, and choreographer (d. 2017)
- January 15
  - Teizo Matsumura, composer and poet (d. 2007)
  - Wataru Kubo, politician (d. 2003)
- January 16 – Shigeru Koyama, actor (d. 2017)
- January 17 – Hideo Murata, rōkyoku and enka singer (d. 2002)
- January 20 – Masaharu Kawakatsu, zoologist
- January 23 – Kenji Suzuki, television announcer (d. 2024)
- January 24 – Katsuo Nishida, long-distance runner (d. 2001)
- January 26 – Sumiteru Taniguchi, survivor of the Nagasaki atomic bombing, and anti–nuclear weapons activist (d. 2017)
- January 30 – Isamu Akasaki, Nobel Prize-winning physicist and engineer (d. 2021)
- February 1 – Jinzō Toriumi, screenwriter (d. 2008)
- February 3 – Koichi Saito, film director (d. 2009)
- February 5 – Taitetsu Unno, scholar, writer, and lecturer (d. 2014)
- February 6 – Masaharu Nagashima, dermatologist and the first professor of dermatology at Kyorin University (d. 2010)
- February 7 – Nobuyoshi Sadanaga, long-distance runner (d. 2003)
- February 13
  - Frankie Sakai, comedian, actor, and musician (d. 1996)
  - Sen-itiroh Hakomori, a Japanese-American biochemist (d. 2020)
- February 14
  - Hirokazu Kobayashi, aikidoka (d. 1998)
  - Masamoto Yashiro, businessman
- February 15 – Tachikawa Sumito, baritone singer and radio host presenter (d. 1985)
- February 17 – Shosaku Numa, neuroscientist (d. 1992)
- February 18 – Takako Saito, visual artist (d. 2025)
- February 19 – Kiyoshi Awazu, graphic designer (d. 2009)
- February 20 – Toshiro Mayuzumi, music composer (d. 1997)
- February 26 – Hideo Gosha, director and screenwriter (d. 1992)
- March 3 – Hajime Sato, film director (d. 1995)
- March 5 – Takao Saito, cinematographer (d. 2014)
- March 20 – Kazue Takahashi, voice actress (d. 1999)
- March 22 – Yayoi Kusama, artist (d. 2026)
- March 28 – Takehiro Irokawa, writer (d. 1989)

=== April–June ===
- April 3
  - Masato Yamanouchi, voice actor (d. 2003)
  - Shinichiro Sakurai, automotive engineer (d. 2011)
- April 6 – Shoichi Ozawa, actor, radio host and singer (d. 2012)
- April 8 – Eiji Kitamura, jazz clarinetist and tenor saxophonist
- April 9 – Hashizo Okawa, film actor (d. 1984)
- April 10 – Yozo Aoki, football player (d. 2014)
- April 11 – Hiroko Takenishi, fiction writer and literary critic
- April 18 – Masayuki Ishii, sailor (d. 2014)
- April 20 – Kazumasa Nagai, printmaker and graphic designer
- April 22 – Otohiko Kaga, writer (d. 2023)
- April 26 – Tsurugamine Akio, sumo wrestler (d. 2006)
- May 4 – Noboru Nakaya, actor (d. 2006)
- May 8 – Miyoshi Umeki, actress (d. 2007)
- May 24 – Takeshi Kato, actor and voice actor (d. 2015)
- June 4 – Nakamura Tomijūrō V, Kabuki actor (d. 2011)
- June 7 – Setsuko Wakayama, actress (d. 1985)
- June 14 – Keizo Hino, writer (d. 2002)
- June 29 – Michio Mamiya, composer (d. 2024)

=== July–September ===
- July 5 – Chikao Ohtsuka, voice actor (d. 2015)
- July 17 – Eiichi Kudo, film director (d. 2000)
- July 22 – Kiichirō Furukawa, astronomer (d. 2016)
- July 28 – Shozo Sasahara, freestyle wrestler (d. 2023)
- August 4 – Kōhei Miyauchi, actor and voice actor (d. 1995)
- August 11
  - Akira Hayasaka, writer (d. 2017)
  - Tetsuo Kondo, politician (d. 2010)
- August 12 – Joji Yuasa, music composer (d. 2024)
- August 18
  - Hidenobu Takahide, politician (d. 2002)
  - Tetsutaro Murano, director (d. 2020)
- August 20 – Yasuro Kikuchi, amateur Go player (d. 2021)
- August 21 – Susumu Nakanishi, linguist
- August 22 – Satoko Kitahara, Japanese Roman Catholic woman (d. 1958)
- August 24 – Ryōko Akamatsu, politician (d. 2024)
- August 31 – Osamu Yamaji, professional footballer (d. 2021)
- September 1 – Tomisaburo Wakayama, actor (d. 1992)
- September 10 – Akio Yashiro, composer (d. 1976)
- September 11 – Akira Kono, Olympic gymnast (d. 1995)
- September 19 – Kojiro Kusanagi, actor (d. 2007)
- September 22 – Kiyoko Sugimura, athlete
- September 29 – Tōru Ōhira, voice actor (d. 2016)
- September 30 – Kazuko, Princess Taka (Now Kazuko Takatsukasa), daughter of Emperor Hirohito and oldest sister of Emperor Emeritus Akihito (d. 1989)

=== October–December ===
- October 4 – Chokei Kishaba, Okinawan martial artist master (d. 2000)
- October 5 – Takeshi Ito, economist and peace activist (d. 2000)
- October 14 – Nagatoshi Sakamoto, film actor (d. 2024)
- October 23 – Akiko Kawarai, artist, jewellery designer, and composer
- October 25
  - Hosei Norota, politician (d. 2019)
  - Kazuo Ikehiro, film director (d. 2025)
- November 7 – Akio Suzuki, medical scientist, educator (d. 2010)
- November 13 – Asashio Tarō III, professional sumo wrestler and rikishi (d. 1988)
- November 15 – Albert Ando, Japanese–American economist (d. 2002)
- November 17 – Gorō Naya, voice actor (d. 2013)
- November 18 – Kiyoshi Kawakubo, voice actor (d. 2019)
- November 28 – Kuniko Mukōda, screenwriter (d. 1981)
- December 1
  - Hidesaburo Hanafusa, virologist (d. 2009)
  - Tomoko Naraoka, actress and narrator (d. 2023)
- December 7 – Keijiro Kaitoku, sailor (d. 1997)
- December 12 – Toshiko Akiyoshi, jazz composer/arranger, bandleader and pianist
- December 14 – Hiroshi Tada, aikido teacher
- December 15 – Jiro Kikkawa, Japanese–Australian ornithologist (d. 2016)

== Deaths ==
- February 10 – Nagai Nagayoshi, chemist and pharmacologist (b. 1844)
- March 22 – Inoue Yoshika, Marshal Admiral (b. 1845)
- April 13 – Gotō Shinpei, politician and scouting pioneer (b. 1857)
- April 27 – Hōjō Tokiyuki, educator, mathematician and politician (b. 1858)
- June 29 – Prince Kuniyoshi Kuni, prince and field marshal (b. 1873)
- July 25 – Shōzō Makino silent film director and producer (b. 1878)
- August 16 – Tsuda Umeko, educator (b. 1864)
- August 26 – Ernest Mason Satow, British scholar, diplomat and Japanologist (b. 1843)
- September 29 – Tanaka Giichi, general and Prime Minister of Japan (b. 1864)
- October 31 – Senshō Murakami, Buddhist scholar and priest
- November 22 – Kamakichi Kishinouye, marine biologist and cnidariologist (b. 1867)
- December 20 – Ryūsei Kishida, painter (b. 1891)

== See also ==
- List of Japanese films of the 1920s
