= Toshiyuki =

- Pronunciation: toɕijɯkʲi (IPA)
- Gender: Male

Origin
- Origin: Japanese
- Meaning: Different meanings depending on the kanji used

Other names
- Alternative spelling: Tosiyuki (Kunrei-shiki) Tosiyuki (Nihon-shiki) Toshiyuki (Hepburn)

Toshiyuki is a masculine Japanese given name.

== Written forms ==
Toshiyuki can be written using different combinations of kanji characters. Here are some examples:

- 敏幸, "agile, happiness"
- 敏行, "agile, go"
- 敏之, "agile, of"
- 敏志, "agile, determination"
- 敏恭, "agile, respectful"
- 俊幸, "talented, happiness"
- 俊行, "talented, go"
- 俊之, "talented, of"
- 俊志, "talented, determination"
- 俊恭, "talented, respectful"
- 利幸, "benefit, happiness"
- 利行, "benefit, go"
- 利之, "benefit, of"
- 寿幸, "long life, happiness"
- 寿行, "long life, go"
- 寿之, "long life, of"
- 年幸, "year, happiness"
- 年行, "year, go"
- 年之, "year, of"

The name can also be written in hiragana としゆき or katakana トシユキ.

== Notable people with the name ==
- Toshiyuki Abe (阿部 敏之; born 1974), Japanese footballer.
- Toshiyuki Adachi (足立 敏之; 1954–2024), Japanese politician.
- Toshiyuki Ando (安藤 俊行; born 1948), Japanese Go player.
- Toshiyuki Arakawa (荒川 敏行; born 1953), Japanese composer.
- Toshiyuki Fujiwara (藤原 敏行, birthdate unknown – 901 or 907), Japanese poet and nobleman.
- Toshiyuki Hayashi (林 敏之; born 1960), Japanese rugby union player.
- Toshiyuki Igarashi (五十嵐 俊幸, born 1984), Japanese boxer.
- Toshiyuki Kajiyama (梶山 季之; 1930–1975), Japanese writer.
- Toshiyuki Kato (加藤 敏幸; born 1949), Japanese politician.
- Toshiyuki Kita (喜多 俊之, born 1942), Japanese furniture and product designer.
- Toshiyuki Kubooka (窪岡 俊之, born 1963), Japanese animator, character designer and illustrator.
- Toshiyuki Kuroiwa (黒岩 敏幸, born 1969), Japanese former speed skater.
- Toshiyuki Miyahara (宮原 利幸; born 1958), Japanese water polo player.
- Toshiyuki Morikawa (森川 智之, born 1967), Japanese voice actor.
- Toshiyuki Moriuchi (森内 俊之, born 1970), Japanese shogi player.
- Toshiyuki Nakao (中尾 敏之, born 1974), Japanese shogi player.
- Toshiyuki Nishida (西田 敏行, born 1947), Japanese actor.
- Toshiyuki Notomi (納富 俊行; born 1971), Japanese weightlifter.
- Toshiyuki Sakai (坂井 寿如; born 1964), Japanese ice hockey player.
- Toshiyuki Sakata (坂田 敏行, 1920–1982), aka "Harold Sakata", Japanese wrestler and actor.
- Toshiyuki Shimada (島田 俊行, born 1951), Japanese-American orchestral conductor.
- Toshiyuki Takahashi (高橋 利幸, born 1959), former executive of Hudson Soft.
- Toshiyuki Takano (高野 紀元, born 1944), Japanese ambassador to Germany.
- Toshiyuki Tanaka (田中 利幸; born 1985), Japanese equestrian.
- Toshiyuki Tanaka (田中 稔之, 1928–2006), Japanese artist.
- Toshiyuki Toyonaga (豊永 利行, born 1984), Japanese voice actor.
- Toshiyuki Uno (マイケル・トシユキ・ウノ, born 1950), Japanese-American film and television director.
- Toshiyuki Watanabe (渡辺 俊幸, born 1955), Japanese musician and composer.

== Fictional characters ==
- Toshiyuki Aoshima (青島 俊之), from Oh! My Goddess.
- Toshiyuki Kohda (コウダ・トシユキ), from Ultraman Saga.
- Toshiyuki Roberi (炉縁 俊幸), from Prefectural Earth Defense Force.
- Toshiyuki Saejima (冴島 俊行), from Great Teacher Onizuka.
