= Yashiro =

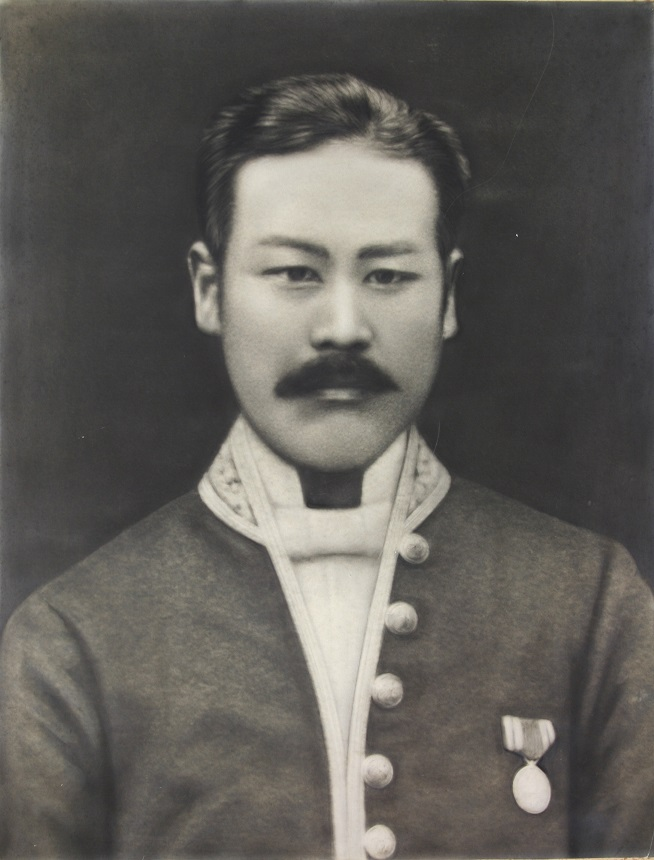
- Misao Yashiro (1852–1891), Japanese educator, one of the founders of Meiji Law School (later Meiji University)
- Pronunciation: jaɕiɾo, jaɕiɾoɯ (IPA)
- Gender: Male

Origin
- Origin: Japanese
- Meaning: Different meanings depending on the kanji used

Other names
- Alternative spelling: Yasiro (Kunrei-shiki) Yasiro (Nihon-shiki) Yashiro (Hepburn)

Yashiro is a Japanese surname and a masculine Japanese given name.

== Written forms ==
Yashiro can be written using different combinations of kanji characters. Here are some examples:

- 社, "shrine"
- 矢士呂, "arrow, knight, backbone"
- 矢白, "arrow, white"

The name can also be written in hiragana やしろ or katakana ヤシロ.

Yashirō or Yashirou is a separate Japanese given name, though it may be romanized the same way Yashiro. Some examples:

- 矢四郎, "arrow, four, son"
- 弥四郎, "more and more, four, son"
- 野四郎, "field, four, son"
- 夜史郎, "night, history, son"
- 八史朗, "eight, history, clear"
- 耶司郎, "question mark, administer, son"

The name can also be written in hiragana やしろう or katakana ヤシロウ.

== Notable people with the given name Yashiro ==
- Yashiro Ujii (雲林院 弥四郎; 1581–1669), Japanese samurai

== Notable people with the surname Yashiro ==
- Aki Yashiro (八代 亜紀; born 1950), Japanese enka singer and painter
- Akio Yashiro (矢代 秋雄; 1929–1976), Japanese composer
- Kageyori Yashiro (屋代 景頼; 1563–1608), Japanese samurai
- Masamoto Yashiro (八城 政基; born 1929), Japanese businessman
- Minase Yashiro (八代 みなせ), Japanese gravure idol, actress, and TV personality
- Misao Yashiro (矢代 操, 1852–1891), Japanese educator, one of the founders of Meiji Law School (later Meiji University).
- Naomi Yashiro (矢代 直美; born 1977), Japanese former basketball player
- Shun Yashiro (矢代 駿; 1933–2003), Japanese actor and voice actor
- Wataru Yashiro (八代 弥; born 1994), Japanese shogi player
- Rokuro Yashiro (八代 六郎; 1860–1930), admiral in the Imperial Japanese Navy and Navy Minister
- Yukio Yashiro (矢代 幸雄; 1890–1975), Japanese academic and art historian

== Fictional characters ==
- Yashiro (矢代), the main character in Twittering Birds Never Fly
- Yashiro Isana (伊佐那 社), the main character in K (TV series)
- Yashiro Gaku (八代 学), the main antagonist in Boku Dake ga Inai Machi
- Yashiro Nanakase (七枷 社), a character from The King Of Fighters
- Yashiro Nene (八尋 寧々), the protagonist of Toilet-Bound Hanako-kun

== See also ==
- Yashiro, Hyōgo
- Yashiro Station
