= Shimako =

- Gender: Female

Origin
- Origin: Japanese
- Meaning: Different meanings depending on the kanji used

Shimako (written: 嗣麻子, 志摩子 or 志摩子) is a feminine Japanese given name. Notable people with the name include:

- Murai Shimako (村井 志摩子; born 1928), Japanese playwright
- Shimako Iwai (岩井 志麻子; born 1964), Japanese writer, tarento and pornographic director
- Shimako Satō (佐藤 嗣麻子; born 1964), Japanese screenwriter and film director

== Fictional characters ==
- Shimako Tōdō (藤堂 志摩子), a character in the light novel series Maria-sama ga Miteru
- Shimako (しまこ), a character in the visual novel Rewrite
