= 1928 in Japanese football =

1928 season

Japanese football in 1928.

== Emperor's Cup ==
October 28, 1928

Waseda WMW	6–1	Kyoto Imperial University
? ?' ? ?' ? ?' ? ?' ? ?' ? ?'		? ?'

Meiji Jingu Gaien Stadium

== Births ==
- June 25 - Seki Matsunaga
- September 30 - Takeshi Inoue
