= Akira Yoshimura =

Japanese writer (1927–2006)

- 吉村 昭
- Born: May 1, 1927
- Died: July 31, 2006 (aged 79)
- Occupation: Writer
- Spouse: Tsumura Setsuko
- Writing career
- Notable works: On Parole and Shipwrecks
- Notable awards: Yomiuri Prize

Akira Yoshimura (吉村 昭, Yoshimura Akira; May 1, 1927 – July 31, 2006) was a Japanese writer. Internationally he is best known for his novels Shipwrecks and On Parole.

== Life and work ==
Yoshimura was the president of the Japanese writers' union and a PEN member. He published over 20 novels, of which On Parole and Shipwrecks are internationally known and have been translated into several languages. In 1984 he received the Yomiuri Prize for his novel Hagoku (破獄, On Parole) based on the true story of Yoshie Shiratori.

After the 2011 Tohoku earthquake and tsunami, Yoshimura's nonfiction chronicle of three previous tsunamis on the coast of Sanriku, Sanriku Kaigan Otsunami received an influx of orders, requiring a reprint of 150,000 copies. Yoshimura's wife and author in her own right, Setsuko Tsumura donated the royalties from the book to the village of Tanohata, which was heavily impacted by the tsunami. Tanohata was a favorite place of Yoshimura's to visit and inspired him to begin research on the historical tsunamis of the area.

In 2024, Mitaka City acquired and relocated Yoshimura's former study to establish the Mitaka City Yoshimura Akira Writing Room, a public museum space dedicated to his life and work.

== Books (selection) ==
- 1966 Senkan Musashi (戦艦武蔵)

- English edition: Battleship Musashi: The Making and Sinking of the Worlds Biggest Battleship (Kodansha USA, 1999)

- 1967 Mizu no sōretsu (水の葬列)
- 1970 Umi no kabe sanriku kaigan ōtsunami (海の壁 三陸沿岸大津波)
- 1977 Kuma arashi (羆嵐) (based on accounts of the Sankebetsu incident, adapted to television in 1980)
- 1978 Tōi hi no sensō (遠い日の戦争)

- English edition: One Man’s Justice (Canongate, 2004), ISBN 978-1-84195-479-0

- 1979 Pōtsumasu no hata (ポーツマスの旗) (on the 1905 Japan-Russia Treaty of Portsmouth negotiation)

- French edition: Les Drapeaux de Portsmouth (Éditions Philippe Picquier, 1990)

- 1982 Hasen (破船)

- English edition: Shipwrecks (破船, Hasen) (Harvest Books, 1996), ISBN 0-15-600835-1

- 1983 Hagoku (破獄)
- 1988 Karishakuhō (仮釈放)

- English edition: On Parole (Harvest Books, 2000), ISBN 978-0-15-601147-1, loosely adapted into a movie as The Eel

- 1989 Yami ni hirameku (闇にひらめく)
- 1998 Namamugi jiken (生麦事件)
- 1999 Amerika Hikozō (アメリカ彦蔵) (on Joseph Heco)

- English edition: Storm Rider (Harcourt, 2004)

- 2010 Shiroi michi, (白い道), Iwanami Shoten, 2010, ISBN 9784000234771 (biographical essays, 208 pages)

== Awards and honors ==
- 1966: Dazai Osamu Prize
- 1973: Kikuchi Kan Prize
- 1985: 36th Yomiuri Prize
- 1997: Japan Art Academy member
- 2006: Order of the Rising Sun, 3rd class
