= On Parole (novel) =

1988 novel by Akira Yoshimura

- First edition
- Author: Akira Yoshimura
- Original title: Kari-Shakuhō
- Translator: Stephen Snyder
- Language: Japanese
- Publisher: Shinchosha
- Publication place: Japan
- Pages: Approx. 256

On Parole (仮釈放, Kari-Shakuhō) is a 1988 novel by Japanese author Akira Yoshimura. The book tells the story of Shiro Kikutani, a man who is serving an indefinite prison sentence for the murder of his unfaithful wife. He is granted parole after fifteen years for good behavior, and after his release he struggles to readjust to a society he no longer recognizes.

The novel is written in the third person narrative mode and is divided into thirteen chapters.

== Plot summary ==
Shiro Kikutani, a teacher, is sent to prison for the murder of his unfaithful wife, the stabbing of her lover, as well as an act of arson carried out against the man's family home which resulted in the death of his mother. While incarcerated, he works in the prison's print shop, behaves well, and generally keeps to himself. After a span of fifteen years, he is granted parole and moves into a halfway house. His parole officer, Kiyoura, takes some basic steps to reintroduce Kikutani into society. Kikutani is unaccustomed to his newfound freedom, and has difficulty doing basic things such as going to the bathroom without asking permission or walking normally without marching in step with the other prisoners.

Kiyoura finds Kikutani a position working at a chicken farm, and tells him that he must soon find an apartment of his own and leave the halfway-house. Because the chicken farm where he will work is far away from the halfway house in the city, Kikutani is encouraged to find an apartment close to his workplace. Kikutani is hesitant to move too far away from the city and his parole officer because he feels a certain degree of security being close to the halfway house, so he instead finds an apartment that is close by even though this will necessitate a long daily commute to work.

Kikutani settles into his new life and is content to go about his unremarkable daily routine. In particular, he is pleased at having little or no contact with other people apart from his monthly visit to his parole officer. One day, by chance, Kikutani passes a woman in the street who closely resembles his wife. This encounter leads Kikutani to travel back to the scene of his crime, his old home town of Sakura, late at night so as not to be noticed. He brings some incense with him to burn at the grave of the old woman who died in the fire, but when he arrives at the cemetery, he realizes that he feels no remorse for his crimes and simply leaves. He does not tell his newly assigned parole officer, Takebayashi, of his trip and nothing more comes of the matter.

Kikutani forms one, rather distant, friendship with one of his co-workers at the chicken farm; he also receives a letter from someone who has recognized him as an ex-prisoner and confesses that he too is a former convict. The two begin a correspondence, but when they decide to meet, the other man loses his nerve and the relationship is abruptly broken off. During one of Kikutani's subsequent parole meetings, Takebayashi, rather surprisingly, raises the prospect of marriage, and explains that he and his wife know an older woman whom they have told about his past and who nonetheless is willing to meet him and consider getting married. Kikutani is surprised at the suggestion and mulls over the idea, but is not particularly open to getting remarried. But after Takebayashi dies Kikutani reconsiders because he feels that this is what others want of him.

He marries the woman, Toyoko, and the two briefly settle into a contented relationship in Kikutani's apartment. Apparently, however, though Toyoko was told of Kikutan's past, she was not told that he would be on parole for the rest of his life. This realization troubles her, and she begins pushing Kikutani to start openly showing grief for his crimes in the hopes of being granted a pardon. One day, Kikutani returns home to find that Toyoko has set up two small altars to his victims. He becomes enraged, loses control of himself, and flings Toyoko down the stairs, killing her. In the final scene, Kikutani helplessly walks back to the halfway house, prepared to confess to Kiyoura what he has done.

== English translations ==
On Parole has been translated into English once for Harcourt by Stephen Snyder.

== Film adaptations ==
On Parole is the basis for the 1997 film The Eel directed by Shohei Imamura; the film differs significantly from the book.
