= The Eel (film) =

1997 film directed by Shōhei Imamura

Unagi
- Film poster
- Directed by: Shōhei Imamura
- Written by: Shohei Imamura, Daisuke Tengan, Motofumi Tomikawa, Akira Yoshimura
- Produced by: Hiso Ino
- Starring: Kōji Yakusho; Misa Shimizu
- Cinematography: Shigeru Komatsubara
- Edited by: Hajime Okayasu
- Music by: Shin'ichirō Ikebe
- Distributed by: Shochiku
- Release dates: 12 May 1997 (Cannes); 24 May 1997 (Japan)
- Running time: 117 minutes
- Country: Japan
- Language: Japanese
- Box office: $5.2 million

The Eel (Japanese: うなぎ, Hepburn: Unagi) is a 1997 Japanese film directed by Shōhei Imamura and starring Kōji Yakusho, Misa Shimizu, Mitsuko Baisho, and Akira Emoto. The film is loosely based on the novel On Parole by celebrated author Akira Yoshimura, combined with elements from the director's 1966 film The Pornographers. It shared the Palme d'Or at the 1997 Cannes Film Festival with Taste of Cherry. It also won the 1998 Kinema Junpo Award for Best Film of the Year.

== Plot ==
In Chiba Prefecture, Japan, acting on the advice of an anonymous note, Takuro Yamashita returns home early one night to find his wife in bed with another man. He kills her and then turns himself in to the police. After being released from prison, he opens a barber shop and brings along a pet eel that he talks to while mostly ignoring conversation with others. He helps save Keiko Hattori from a suicide attempt, resulting in her working at the shop. She starts developing romantic feelings for him, but he acts nonchalant and refuses the boxed lunches she prepares for him when he goes eel-hunting with the fisherman Jukichi Takada.

Takuro recognizes the local garbageman from prison, and the garbageman starts to stalk Takuro and Keiko, believing that Takuro isn't repentant enough for his crimes. He attempts to rape Keiko and leaves a letter revealing Takuro's past on the door of his barber shop, but it is removed by Takada. Keiko finds out that she is pregnant with the baby of Eiji Dojima, a loan shark, and that it is too late for an abortion.

One night, the garbageman goes to Takuro's shop and lectures him, accusing him of killing his wife out of jealousy. The two get into an altercation and Takuro fends him off. Keiko goes back to her old company, where she is the vice-president, and retrieves her mother's bankbook. This results in Dojima angrily going to the barber shop, along with henchmen, and accusing her of theft since he was planning to reinvest the funds into his business. Dojima's group and Keiko's fight, with the false revelation that Keiko is pregnant with Takuro's child. The police find that Keiko's mother never signed power of attorney papers for Dojima, but a parole violation meeting for Takuro causes him to be sent back to prison for a year. Takuro lets his eel go and accepts a boxed lunch from Keiko, who promises to wait for him with her baby.

== Cast ==
- Kōji Yakusho – Takuro Yamashita
- Misa Shimizu – Keiko Hattori
- Mitsuko Baisho – Misako Nakajima
- Akira Emoto – Tamotsu Takasaki
- Makoto Sato – Jukichi Takada
- Fujio Tsuneta – Jiro Nakajima
- Show Aikawa – Yuji Nozawa
- Ken Kobayashi – Masaki Saito
- Sabu Kawahara – Seitaro Misato
- Etsuko Ichihara – Fumie Hattori
- Tomorowo Taguchi – Eiji Dojima
- Chiho Terada – Emiko Yamashita

== Reception ==
Lawrence Van Gelder of The New York Times said that the film "swims with grace, insight and vast compassion," complimenting the "vivid" cast that allowed the director "not only to bare the passions that seethe beneath the orderly surface and apparent conformity of Japanese life but also to ponder emotions and issues that know no nationality." David Stratton of Variety described the film as "filled with colorful characters, and fluctuating alarmingly—but with surprising success—among several levels on the emotional spectrum," saying that the director "has created a rich tapestry of characters and situations, all of it vividly brought to life with pristine visuals and a generous emotional warmth." Describing its cinematography, Noah Cowan of Filmmaker said that the film "is shot in sunny, saturated colors, lending it the air of a filmmaker content with his achievements in the sunset of his career."

On the review aggregator website Rotten Tomatoes, 82% of 28 critics' reviews are positive, with an average rating of 7.1/10. Metacritic, which uses a weighted average, assigned the film a score of 81 out of 100, based on 21 critics, indicating "universal acclaim".

Film critic Tadao Sato stated that in light of a lack of attention regarding Japanese films in Japan itself at the time, the Japanese public had a lack of awareness about the film, and in regards to positive foreign reception of The Eel, "It was gratifying, then, that 'Unagi' should receive international recognition at a time when Japanese themselves were ignoring such films."
