= Prurigo pigmentosa =

- Specialty: Dermatology

Prurigo pigmentosa is a rare skin condition of unknown cause, characterized by the sudden onset of erythematous papules that leave a reticulated hyperpigmentation when they heal. The condition has been associated with a strict ketogenic diet in case reports in the medical literature. It was first reported by Masaharu Nagashima in 1978. Research has shown that it may be caused by gut bacteria dysbiosis as a result of ketosis.

== See also ==
- Pruritus
- Skin lesion
- Masaharu Nagashima
