= Masaharu Nagashima =

Japanese dermatologist

- Born: February 1929; Tokyo
- Died: May 2010 (aged 81)
- Occupations: Physician (Dermatologist), Professor of Dermatology, Kyorin University
- Known for: Found and named a skin disease Prurigo pigmentosa

Masaharu Nagashima (長島 正治, Nagashima Masaharu; February 1929 – May 2010) was a Japanese dermatologist, the first professor of dermatology at Kyorin University, who proposed the designation of prurigo pigmentosa.

He was born in Tokyo in February 1929. After qualification of a dentist, he graduated from Keio University and entered the Department of Dermatology and Urology in 1955. In 1961, he became assistant professor of Keio University. In 1974, he became the first professor of dermatology at Kyorin University. In 1994, he retired and died in 2010.

In 1971, Nagashima reported a peculiar pruritic dermatosis he designated prurigo pigmentosa. In 1978, he made a report of 14 cases in English. It has come to be recognized as a clinical entity. Although it is mostly reported from Japan, it is reported also from other countries. It is characterized by itchy red papules over the trunk and neck, which fade and leave reticular pigmentation. This disorder has been more common in adult females. About one third improve with dapsone. The cause is not known.
