= Setsuko Tsumura =

Japanese novelist

- 津村 節子
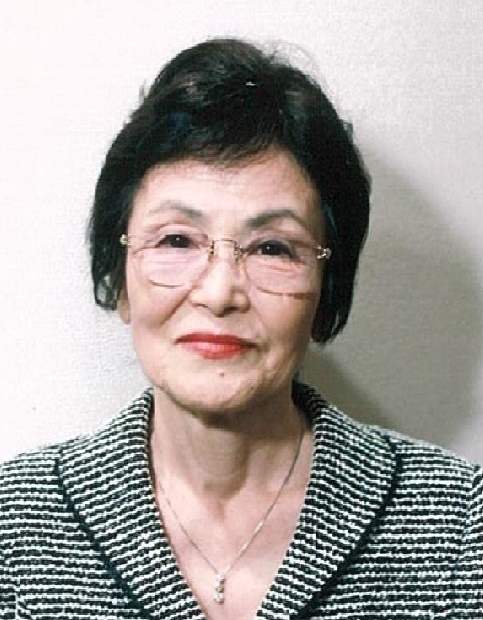
- Born: 5 June 1928 (age 98)
- Occupation: Writer
- Spouse: Akira Yoshimura
- Writing career
- Notable work: "Gangu" (Toys)
- Notable awards: Akutagawa Prize

Setsuko Tsumura (津村節子, Tsumura Setsuko; born 5 June 1928) is a Japanese novelist. She is a 1965 recipient of the Akutagawa Prize.

== Early life ==
Tsumura was born in the capital city of Fukui, Japan. Her mother died when she was nine years old. Two years later, she moved to Tokyo. Her father, a silk weaver, died when she was sixteen. Between 1947 and 1948, at the age of nineteen, Tsumura ran her own dressmaking shop, employing three other dressmakers. Despite the success of her business, she closed the shop to attend Gakushuuin Women's Junior College, where she studied literature and edited the student literary magazine. She met her husband, Akira Yoshimura (1927–2006), while contributing to the literary magazine at his college. Tsumura graduated in 1953 and married soon after.

== Career ==
Tsumura was nominated for the Naoki Prize in 1959 for her short story, "Kagi" (Key), which she wrote for Bungakukai magazine. She was awarded the Akutagawa Prize in 1965 for her short story "Gangu" (Playthings), a story about an expectant mother who is disappointed by her husband's indifference to their pregnancy. In 1972, Tsumura's short story, "Saihate" (The Farthest Limit) won the Shincho Prize. It was based on Tsumura's personal experience after the collapse of her husband's business.

Tsumura's 1983 biographical novel, Shirayuri no kishi (Precipice of a White Lily) is about Tomiko Yamakawa (1879–1909), a poet from Tsumura's native Fukui.

Tsumura's novel, Ryuuseiu (A Meteoric Shower) won the Women's Literature Prize in 1990. It depicted the Boshin War from the perspective of a 15-year-old girl.

She is a member of the Japan Art Academy and was recognized as a person of cultural merit in 2016.

== Bibliography ==
Type of literary work denoted in parentheses.

Japanese title	Reading	English title	Publish date	Publisher
海鳴 (novel)	Umi nari	Rumbling of the Sea	1965	Kodansha
風の吹く町 (short story collection)	Kaze no fuku machi	The Windy Town	1970	Gekkan-pensha
白い焔 (short story collection)	Shiroi honoo	White Flames	1971	Yomiuri-shimbunsha
さい果て (short story collection)	Saihate	The Farthest Limit	1972	Chikumashobo
?? (short story collection)	Tomurai me	Woman Undertaker	1973	Chikumashobo
炎の舞い (novel)	Honoo no mae	Blazing Dance of the Kiln	1975	Shinchosha
星がゆれる時 (novel)	Hoshi ga yureru toki	When the Star Trembles	1976	Kobunsha
遅咲きの梅 (novel)	Osozaki no ume	Late-Blooming Plums	1978	Chuokoronsha
?? (novel)	Haru no yokan	Spring Anticipation	1979	Bungeishunjusha
重い歳月 (novel)	Omoi saigetsu	Heavy Months	1980	Shinchosha
冬の虹 (novel)	Fuyu no niji	Winter Rainbow	1981	Shinchosha
母の部屋 (short story collection)	Haha no heya	My Mother's Room	1982	Shueisha
白百合の崖(biography)	Shirayuri no kishi	Precipice of a White Lily	1983	Shinchosha
海の星座 (novel)	Umi no seiza	The Sea Constellation	1984	Mainichi-shimbunsha
千輪の華 (novel)	Senrin no hana	Thousand Flowers	1985	Shinchosha
土と炎の里(essays)	Tsuchi to honoo no sato	The Village of Clay and Blaze	1986	Chuokoronsha
惑い (short story collection)	Madoi	Delusion	1987	Yomiuri-shimbunsha
幸福村 (short story collection)	Koofuku na mura: Ten ro	The Village of Happiness: A Sculling Oar of Heaven	1989	Shinchosha
霧棲む里 (novel)	Kiri sumu sato	A Foggy Village	1989	Kodansha
流星雨 (novel)	Ryuuseiu	A Meteoric Shower	1990	Iwanamishoten
紅梅 (novel)	Koobai	Red Blossomed Plum Tree	2011	Bungeishunjusha

=== Translated works ===
Tsumura's 1969 short story "Yakoodokei" (夜光時計) was translated under the title "Luminous Watch." It is included in the anthology This Kind of Woman: Ten Stories by Japanese Women Writers by Elizabeth Hanson and Yukiko Tanaka.

"Gangu," the short story that won Tsumura the Akutagawa Prize, was translated by Kyoko Evanhoe and Robert N. Lawson for the Japan Quarterly in 1980 under the name "Playthings."
