= Masayuki Ishii =

Japanese sailor

Personal information
- Nationality: Japanese
- Born: 18 April 1929; Kanagawa, Japan
- Died: 12 February 2014 (aged 84)

Sport
- Sport: Sailing

Masayuki Ishii (18 April 1929 – 12 February 2014) was a Japanese sailor. He competed at the 1960 Summer Olympics and the 1964 Summer Olympics.
