= Akihiko Okamura =

Japanese photographer

Akihiko Okamura (岡村 昭彦, Okamura Akihiko; 1929–1985) was a Japanese photographer.

== Work ==
Okamura was a war photographer, in the first years of the Vietnam War, as well as in conflict zones in Ethiopia, Biafra, and Northern Ireland.

== Publications ==
- All About Life and Death. Bijutsu Shuppan-Sha, 2014. ISBN 9784568104806.
- The Memories of Others. Prestel, 2024. ISBN 978-3791393247.

== Exhibitions ==
=== Solo exhibitions ===
- Akihiko Okamura: All About Life and Death, Tokyo Photographic Art Museum, Tokyo, July–September 2014
- Akihiko Okamura: The Memories of Others, Photo Museum Ireland, Dublin, 11 April – 6 July 2024

=== Group exhibitions ===
- Strange and Familiar, Barbican Centre, London, March–June 2016

== General references ==
- Nihon shashinka jiten (日本写真家事典) / 328 Outstanding Japanese Photographers. Kyoto: Tankōsha, 2000. ISBN 4-473-01750-8. (in Japanese) Despite the English-language alternative title, all in Japanese.
