= Yozo Aoki =

Japanese footballer

Yozo Aoki 青木 要三
Personal information
- Full name: Yozo Aoki
- Date of birth: April 10, 1929
- Place of birth: Japan
- Date of death: April 23, 2014 (aged 85)
- Place of death: Japan
- Position: Defender

Senior career*
Years	Team	Apps	(Gls)
- Chiyoda Life

International career
1955	Japan	1	(0)
- * Club domestic league appearances and goals

Yozo Aoki (青木 要三, Aoki Yōzō; April 10, 1929 – April 23, 2014) was a Japanese football player. He played for the Japan national team.

== Club career ==
Aoki was born on April 10, 1929. He played for Chiyoda Life.

== National team career ==
On January 5, 1955, he debuted for the Japan national team against Burma, his first and only appearance for Japan.

Aoki died on April 23, 2014, at the age of 85.

== National team statistics ==
Japan national team
Year	Apps	Goals
1955	1	0
Total	1	0
