= Kiyozō Kazama =

Kiyozō Kazama (風間 喜代三, Kazama Kiyozō; born 8 December 1928 in Tokyo) is a Japanese professor of comparative linguistics, specializing in Latin and Greek, and emeritus professor at Tokyo University. He studied comparative grammar under Kōzu Harushige at the department of linguistics at Tokyo University, and graduated in 1952. He studied abroad under a scholarship grant at Vienna University and returned to become assistant, and then full, professor at his alma mater. He was awarded his doctorate in September 1978 on the subject of kinship terminology in Indo-European languages. On his retirement, he subsequently taught at Hosei University. He is one of Japan's leading scholars in Indo-European studies, with a particular interest in etymology.

== Publications ==
- Gengogaku no tanjō: hikaku gengogaku shoshi, Iwanami Shoten, Tokyo 1978
- Kotoba no seikatsushi, Heibonsha, Tokyo 1987
- Kotoba no shintaishi, Heibonsha, Tokyo 1990
- In’ōgo no kokyō o saguru, Iwanami Shinsho, Tokyo 1995
- Girishago to ratengo Sanseidō, Tokyo 1998
- Ratengo. Sono katachi to kokoro, Sanseidō, Tokyo 2005

== Works in collaboration with others ==
- Uwano Zendō et al., Gengogaku Tokyo Daigaku Shuppankai, 1993

== See also ==
- Kōzu Harushige
