= Sakanaya Honda =

1929 film

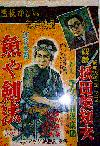
- Japanese movie poster
- Directed by: Shuichi Yamashita
- Written by: Takai Kiyotaro 高井清太郎
- Produced by: Teikinema 帝国キネマ演芸
- Starring: Ensho Jitsukawa
- Release date: 22 February 1929
- Running time: 7 reels
- Country: Japan
- Language: Silent (Japanese intertitles)

Sakanaya Honda (魚屋本多), also known as Fish and Swordsmanship and Sakanaya Kenpo, is a 1929 Japanese film directed by Shuichi Yamashita.

== Cast ==
- Ensho Jitsukawa
- Dojuro Kataoka
- Akane Hisano
