= Kimiko Nishimoto =

Japanese photographer and internet celebrity (1928–2025)

Kimiko Nishimoto (西本 喜美子, Nishimoto Kimiko; 22 May 1928 – 9 June 2025) was a Brazilian-born Japanese photographer and internet celebrity. She was previously a hairdresser, track cyclist and homemaker.

== Early life and education ==
Kimiko Nishimoto was born in Brazil in 1928. Her parents taught agriculture to locals. She was the second daughter of 7 siblings. At the age of 8, her family moved to Kumamoto. She graduated from beauty school.

== Career ==
Nishimoto worked as a hairdresser in her father's salon where she specialized in bridal and Japanese coiffure. After four years working as a hairdresser, Nishimoto attended cycling school and became licensed as a professional cyclist. From the age of 22 to 27, she competed nationally as a track cyclist with her two younger brothers.

In 2001, Nishimoto began her career as an amateur photographer after taking a photography and image processing course taught by her eldest son. In 2011, she had her first solo exhibit at the Kumamoto Prefectural Museum of Art. In 2018, she had an exhibition named "Asobokane?" (transl. "Shall We Play?") in Shinjuku. As of March 2020, Nishimoto had developed a social media presence, with over 220,000 followers of her Instagram account.

== Personal life and death ==
At the age of 27, Nishimoto married Hitoshi, a tax official, and they raised their three children in Kyushu. She was a homemaker for over 45 years. Nishimoto's husband died in 2012 of lung cancer. As of May 2018, Nishimoto resided in Kumamoto Prefecture. In reference to her longevity, Nishimoto stated that she was a daily cigarette smoker and drank a tall glass of Bourbon whiskey every day.

Nishimoto died on June 9, 2025, at the age of 97.
