= Akio Suzuki =

Japanese heart surgeon (1929–2010)

Akio Suzuki (鈴木章夫, Suzuki Akio, November 7, 1929 – October 28, 2010) was a Japanese doctor, medical scientist, educator and president of Tokyo Medical and Dental University (TMDU). He was best known as an expert on heart surgery.

== Early life ==
Suzuki earned his medical degree from TMDU in 1956. His training continued as a surgical intern in Tokyo at the U.S. Army Hospital. He was a surgical resident at Albany Medical School in New York.

== Career ==
In 1950, his medical career began as a staff surgeon at St Vincent's Hospital in Cleveland, Ohio. His academic career began in 1971 as an associate professor at the medical school of the University of Mississippi. When he returned to Japan in 1974, he was a professor of chest surgery at Juntendo University.

In 1983, he joined the faculty of TMDU. He was named president of TMDU in 1995.

== Legacy ==
Akio Suzuki Memorial Hall at TMDU is named after the doctor's honor.
