= Kazumasa Nagai =

Japanese printmaker and graphic designer (1929–2026)

Kazumasa Nagai (Japanese: 永井 一正, Nagai Kazumasa; Ōsaka, April 20, 1929 – February 23, 2026) was a Japanese printmaker and graphic designer. He attended the Tokyo University of the Arts to study sculpture, and withdrew due to health problems.

Nagai was a founding member of the Nippon Design Center (NDC, established in 1959), and was its president.

His first works were abstract, then he changed to handmade designs of animals and plants in the 1980s. Some of his works appeared on the cover of LIFE.

His work is held in museums including the Fine Arts Museum of San Francisco, the National Gallery of Australia, the Museum of New Zealand, the British Museum, the University of Michigan Museum of Art, the Walker Art Center, the Stedelijk Museum Amsterdam, the National Museum of Contemporary Art in Tokyo, the Museum of Applied Arts and Sciences, and the Museum of Modern Art.

Nagai died on February 23, 2026, at the age of 96.

== Sources ==
- documenta III. Internationale Ausstellung; Katalog: Band 1: Malerei und Skulptur; Band 2: Handzeichnungen; Band 3: Industrial Design, Graphik; Kassel/Colonia 1964
