= Masatoshi Yoshino =

Japanese physical geographer and climatologist

- 吉野 正敏
- Born: January 1, 1928
- Died: July 4, 2017 (aged 89)
- Known for: Founder and chairman of the IGU Commission on Climatology, Vice President of the IGU
- Awards: IGU Lauréat d'Honneur (2000)
- Scientific career
- Fields: Physical geography, climatology
- Institutions: Hosei University, University of Tsukuba, Aichi University

Masatoshi Yoshino (吉野 正敏, Yoshino Masatoshi; January 1, 1928 – July 4, 2017) was a Japanese physical geographer and climatologist. He served as the founder and chairman of the International Geographical Union's (IGU) Commission on Climatology from 1988 to 1992, as well as the Vice President of the IGU from 1992 until 1996. He was a full professor at Hosei University (1969–1974), University of Tsukuba (1974–1991) and Aichi University (1991–1998).

In 1980, Yoshino served as the Secretary General of the International Geographical Congress' conference in Tokyo. He had been a foreign honorary member of the Romanian Academy since 1992, and a recipient of the IGU's Lauréat d'Honneur award in 2000. He died on July 4, 2017, at the age of 89.
