= Shimako Murai =

Japanese playwright (1928–2018)

Shimako Murai (村井 志摩子, Murai Shimako, 12 July 1928 – 9 May 2018) was a Japanese playwright. She was born in Hiroshima, but was not in the city on the day of the atomic bombings. She lost many friends in the bombing, and her profound sense of guilt led her to devote most of her life to producing plays connected with the Hiroshima bombings.

She felt a strong affinity with the architect Jan Letzel, who had designed the Hiroshima Prefectural Commercial Exhibition building, which — by a stroke of luck — somehow survived the atomic bomb's blast, and thereby became the famous A-bomb dome. Letzel was Czech, and Murai decided to study in Prague. She translated various works between Czech and Japanese, including the first Japanese renditions of plays by Josef Topol, Václav Havel and Milan Kundera, and opera by Smetana and Janáček. For this work she won the 1968 Kinokuniya Theatre Award.

Later her own plays were performed and won awards throughout Japan, as well as in Maui (Hawaii), the Avignon Festival and the Edinburgh Fringe, starring actresses such as Mahō Shibuki (ex Takarazuka), Takajō Miki (ex SKD=Shochiku Kageki Dan) and Kurihara Chieko (JMDB).

She was married to Kuzui Kinshirō (ja:葛井欣士郎), a film producer and manager of the alternative Art Theatre Shinjuku Bunka during the 1960s and early 1970s.

She died on 9 May 2018, at her home in Shinjuku.

== See also ==
- Japanese literature
- List of Japanese authors
