= Toshiyuki Tanaka (artist) =

Japanese contemporary artist

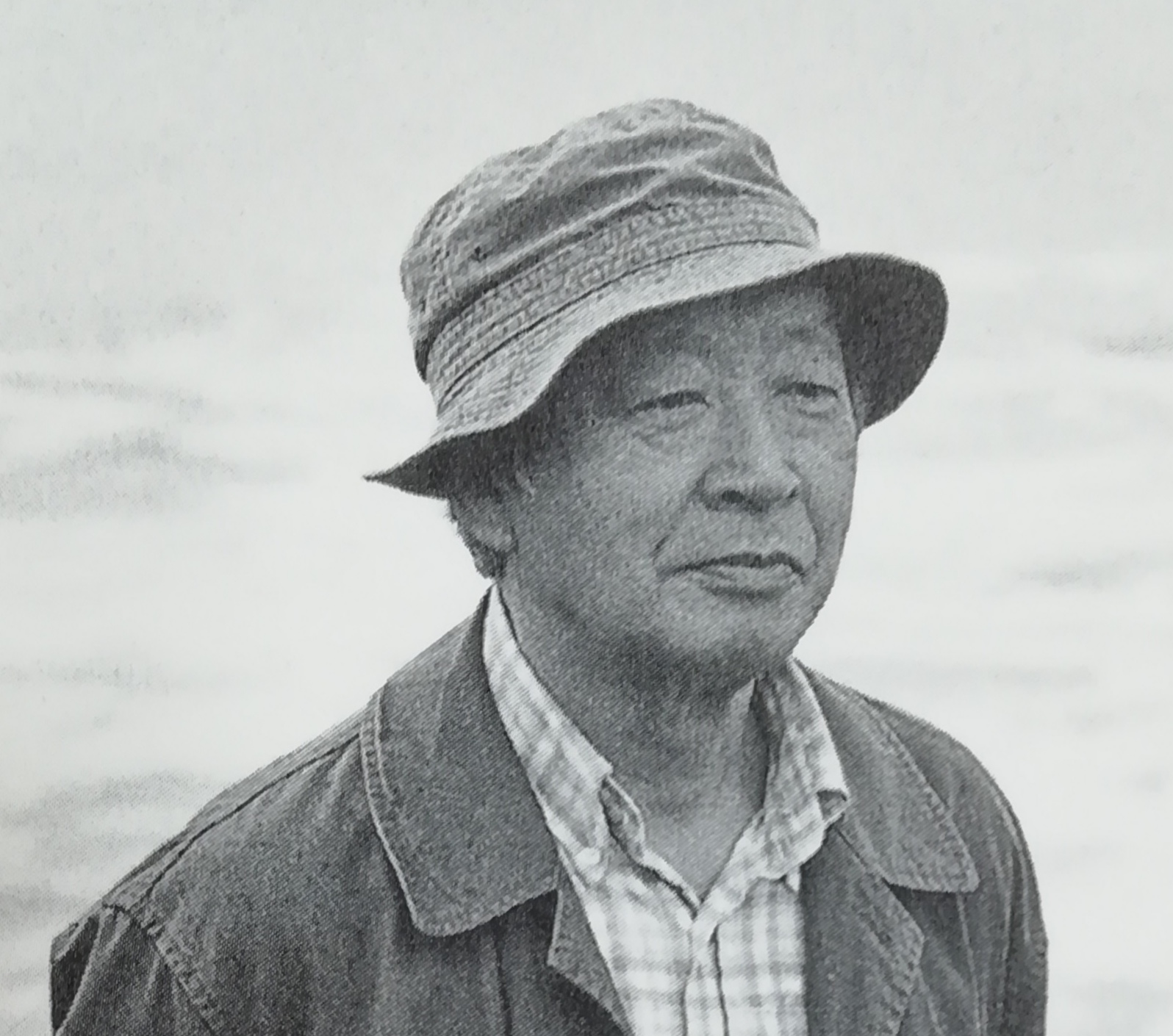
- Born: 13 April 1928; Yamaguchi Prefecture, Japan
- Died: 7 August 2006 (aged 78)
- Occupations: Painter, artist, author
- Style: Abstract art
- Movement: Informalism

Toshiyuki Tanaka (田中 稔之 Tanaka Toshiyuki; April 13, 1928 – August 7, 2006) was a Japanese contemporary artist known for his use of overlapping vermilion and orange circles as the main motif in his paintings and large scale mosaic murals.

== Collections ==
- Museum of Contemporary Art Tokyo
- Aichi Prefectural Museum of Art

== Gallery ==
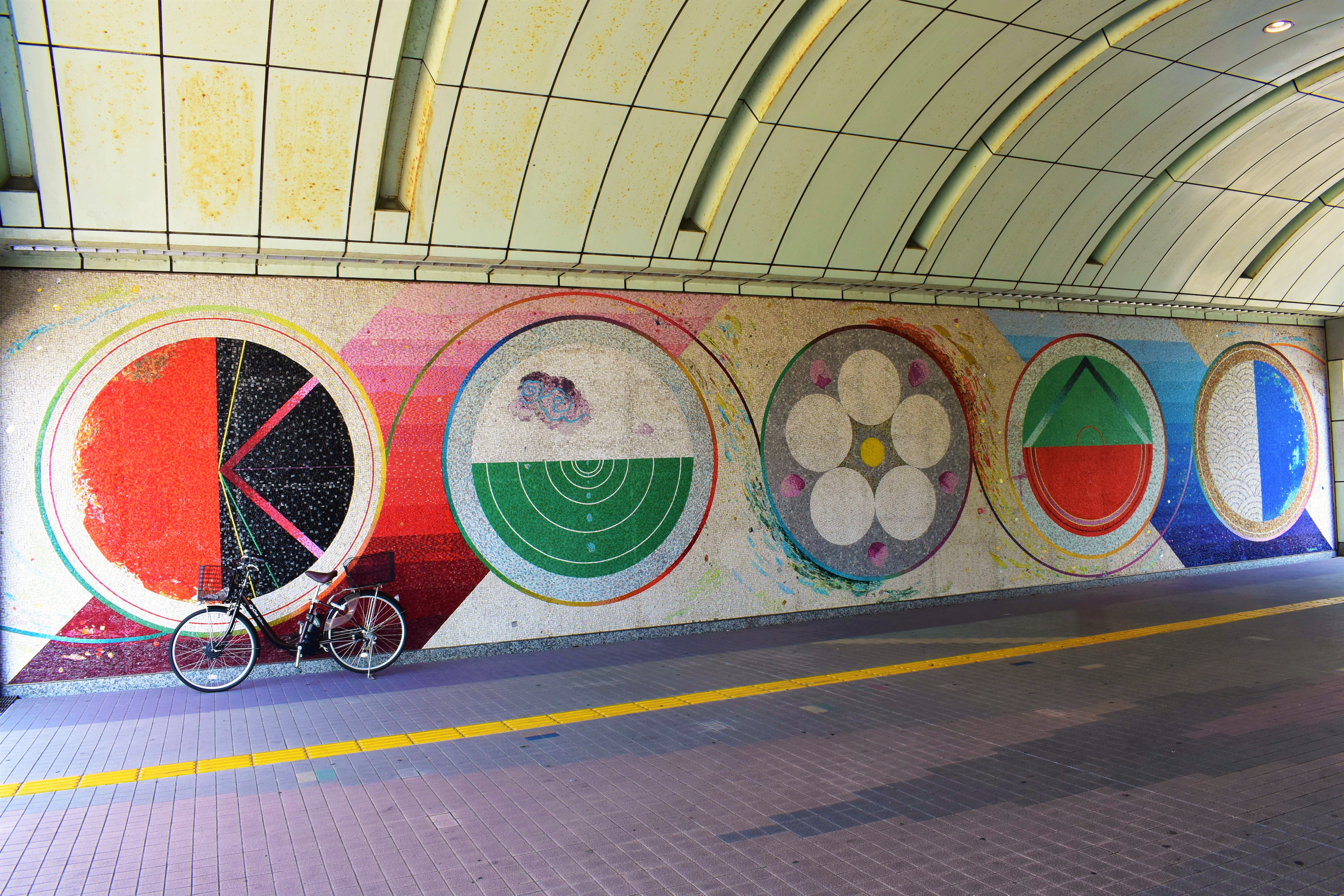
Toshiyuki Tanaka, Vibrations, 1994, mural mosaic in a pedestrian passage at Hofu Station, Hofu City

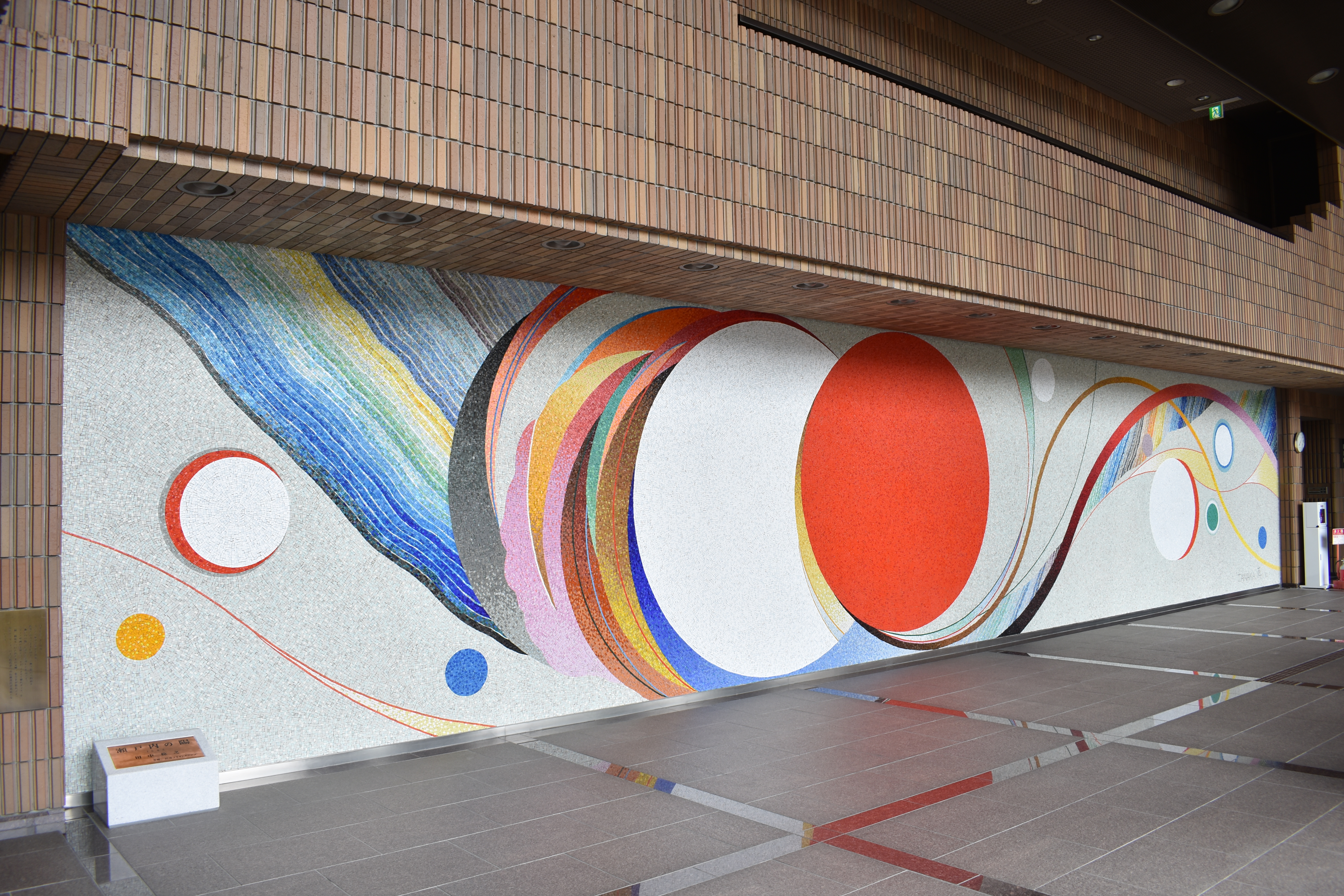
Toshiyuki Tanaka, 1982, Setouchi Sunlight, mural mosaic, Hofu City Council Building

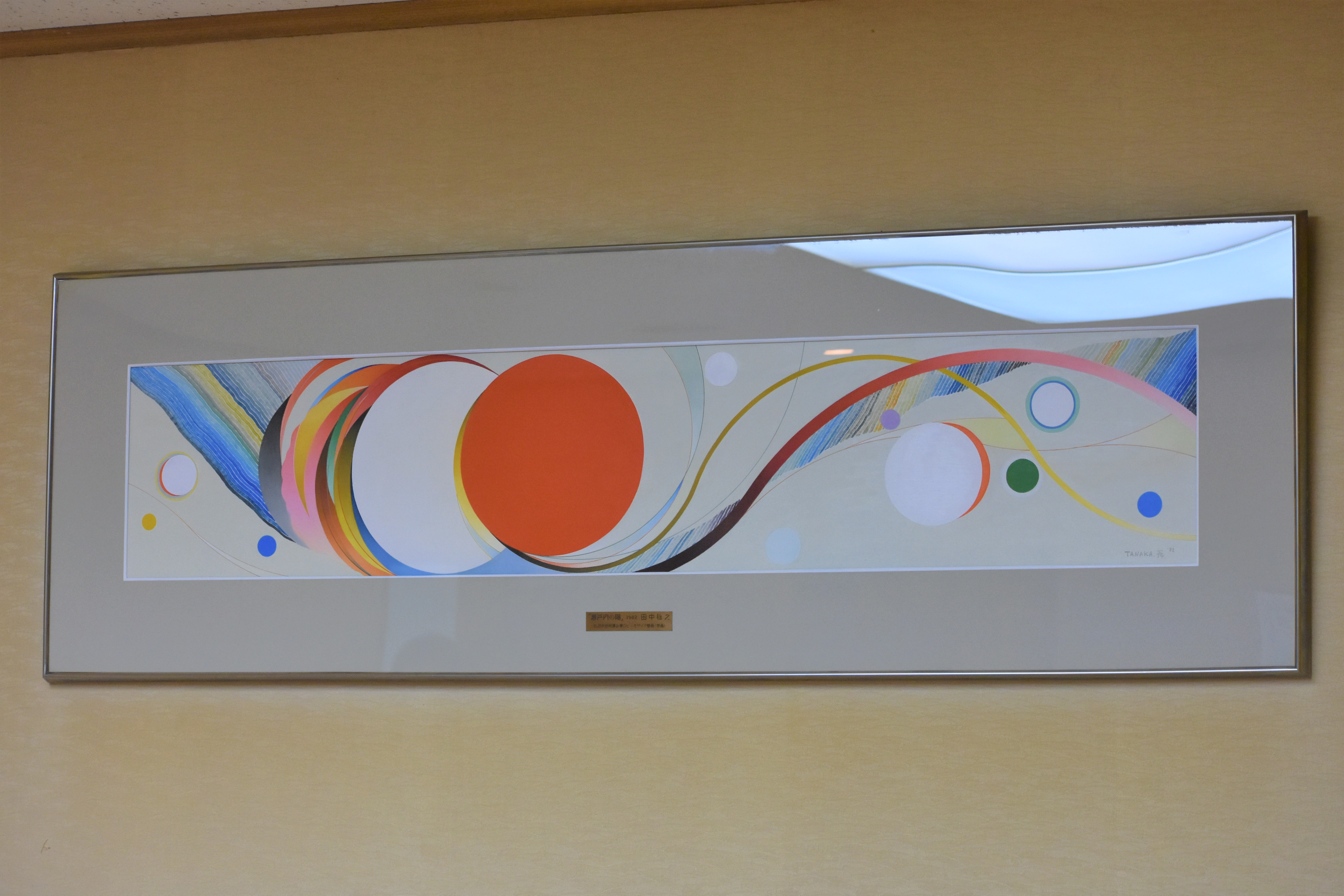
Toshiyuki Tanaka, 1982, Setouchi Sunlight, model painting for a mosaic

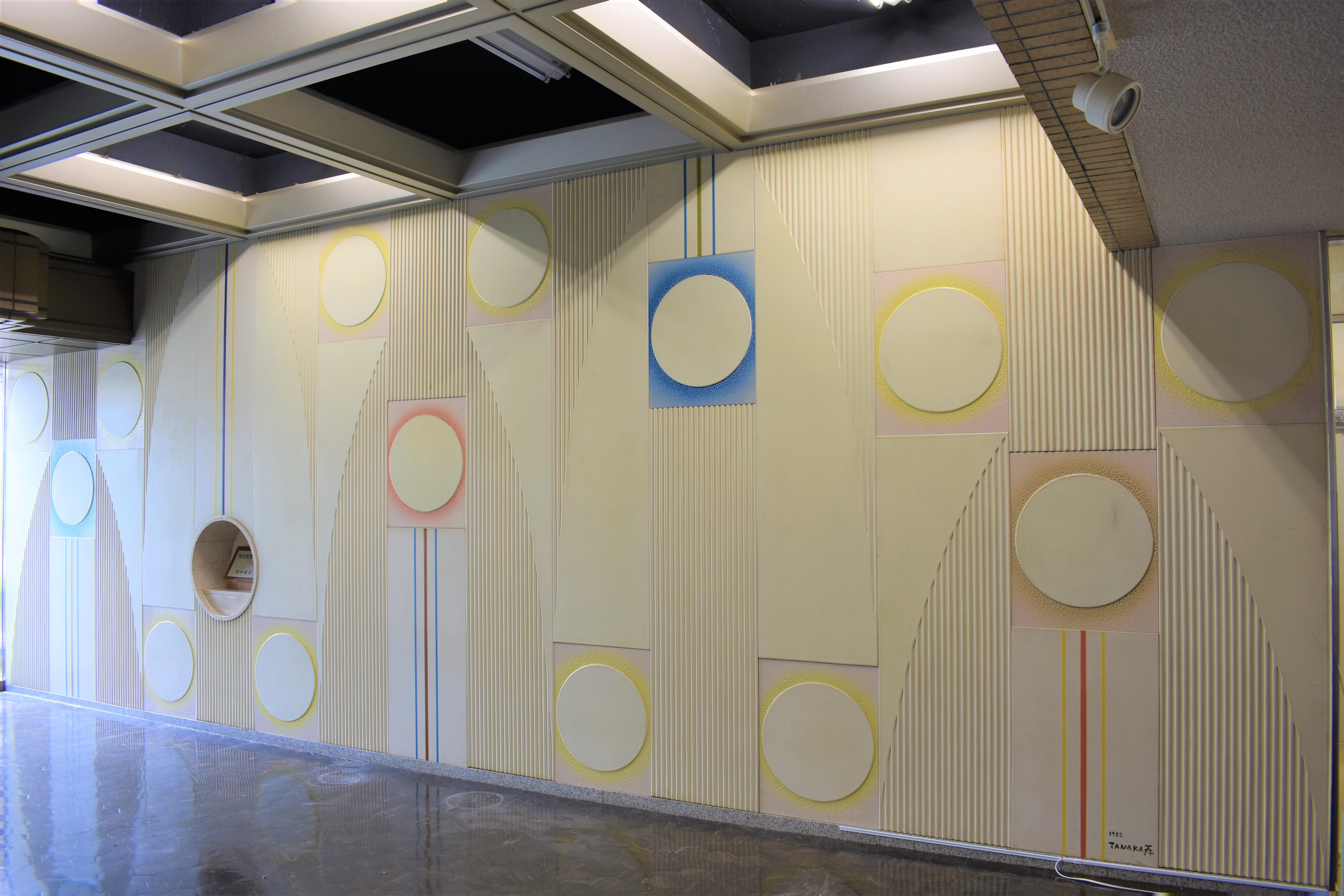
Tanaka Toshiyuki, 1982, Circle Spectacle (Atmosphere), relief wall, Yamaguchi General Government Building

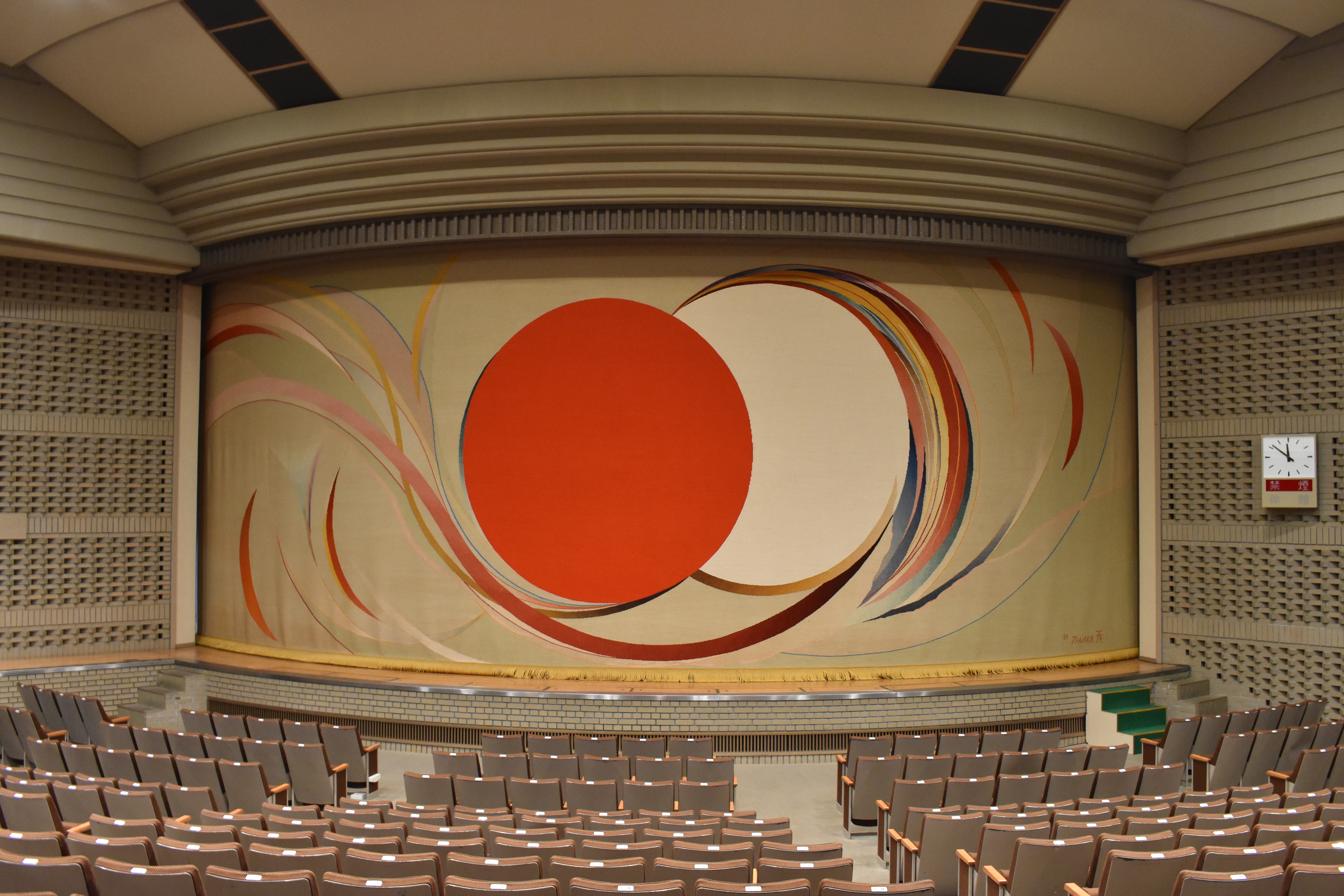
Toshiyuki Tanaka, 1982, Flying, tapestry, Government Office Building

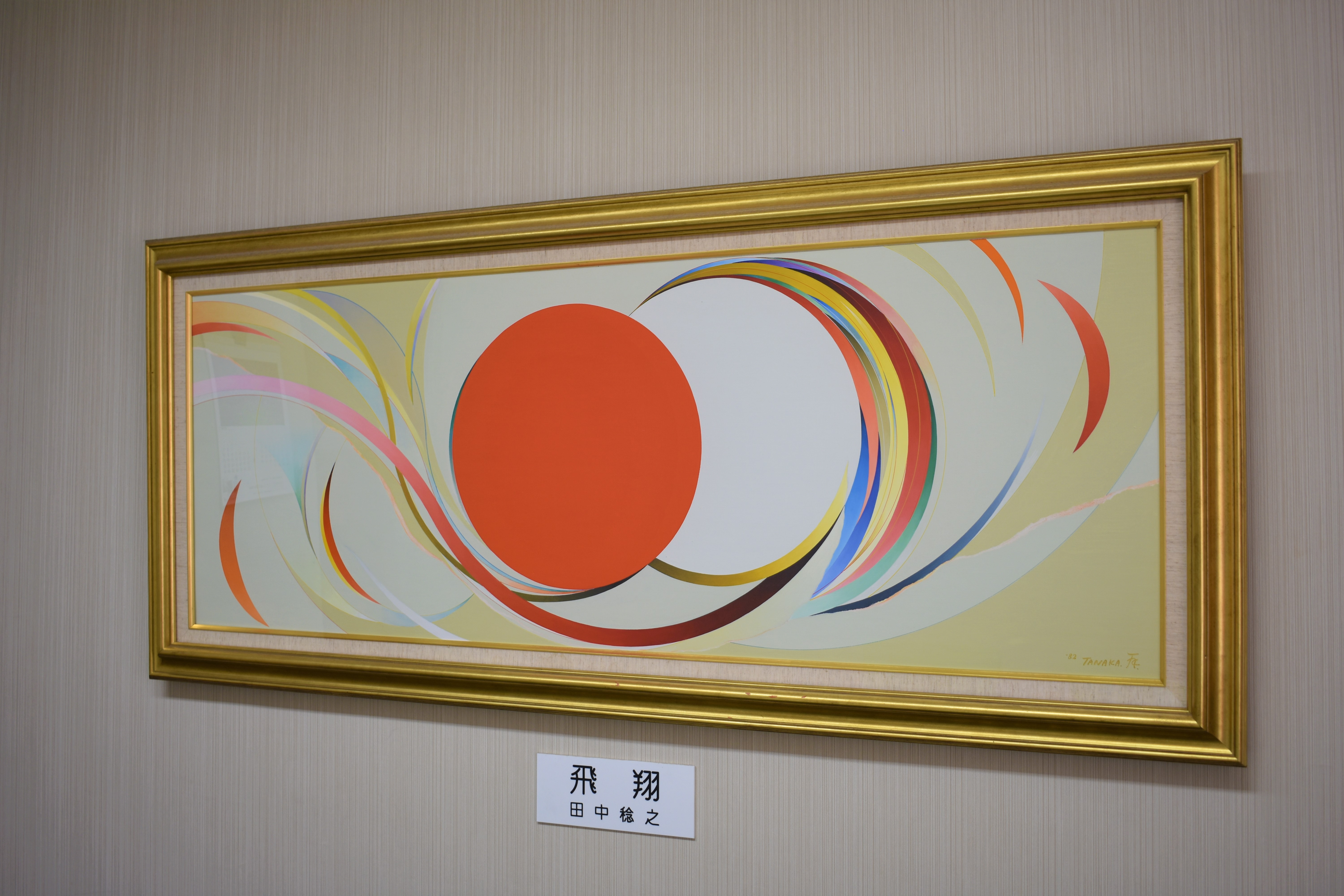
Toshiyuki Tanaka, 1982, Flying, model painting for a tapestry, Yamaguchi Government Office Building

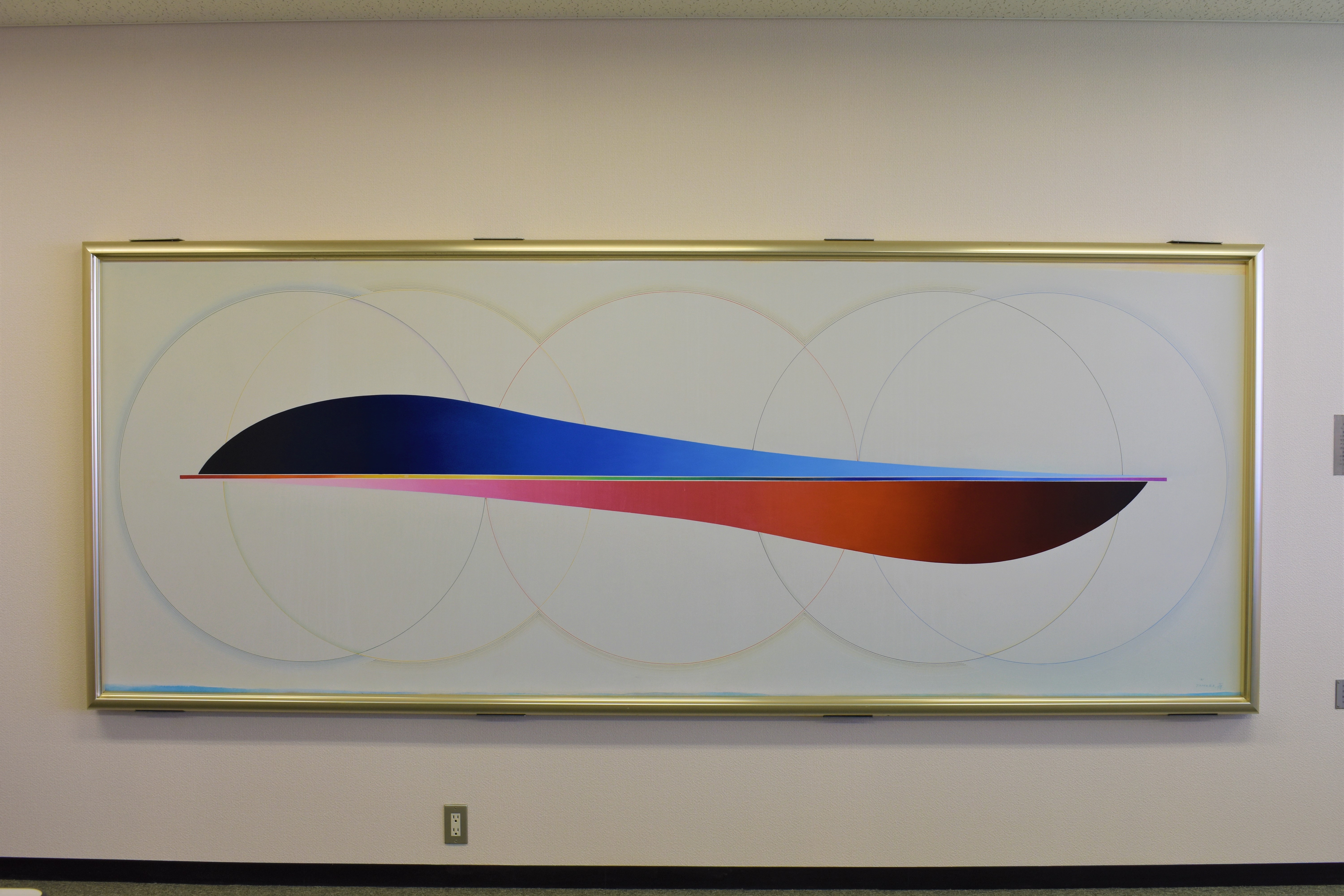
Toshiyuki Tanaka, 1991, Tomorrow, Japan Ultra-high Temperature Materials Research Institute

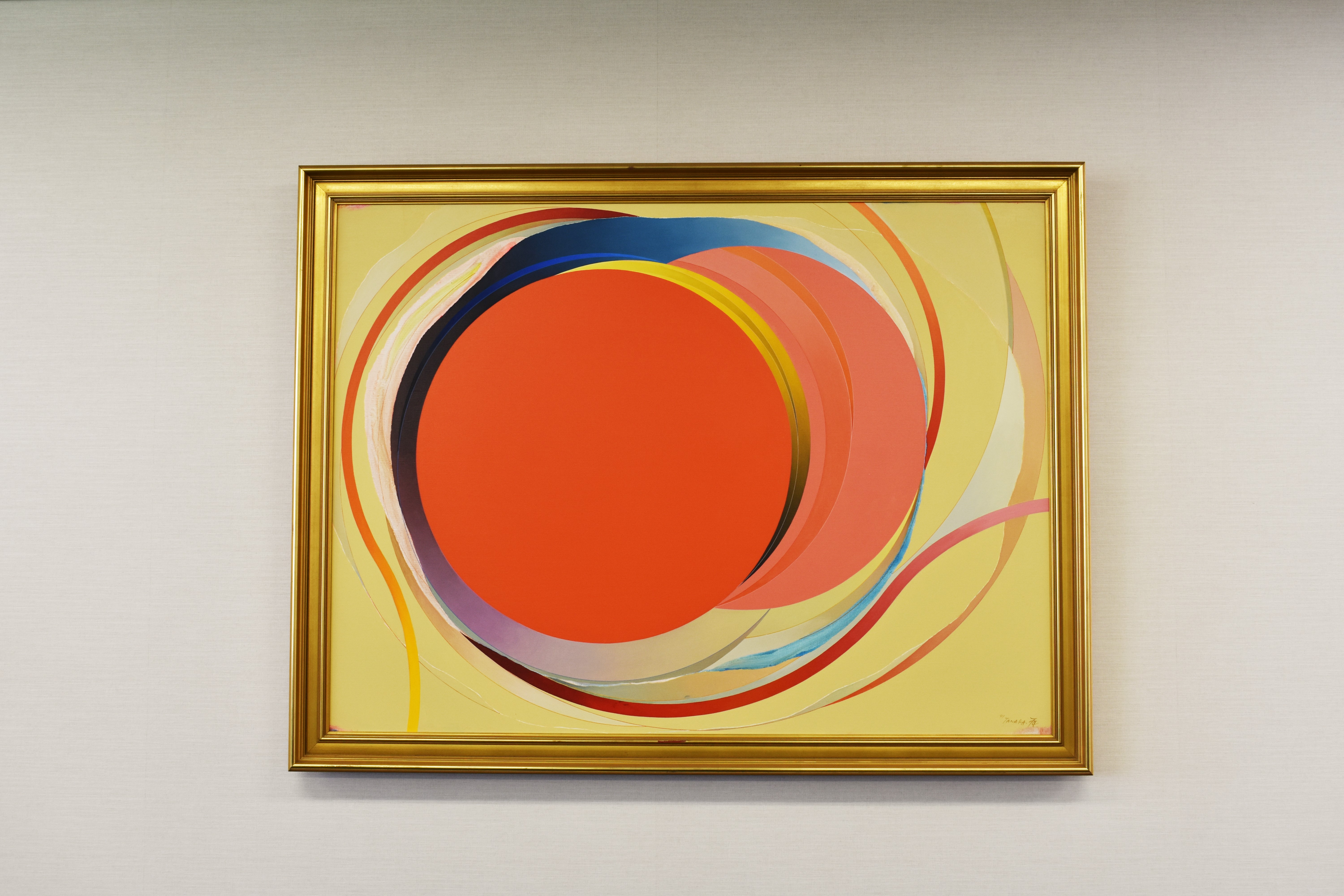
Toshiyuki Tanaka, from the Circle Period (red), Japan Ultra-high Temperature Materials Research Institute in Ube City, Yamaguchi Prefecture

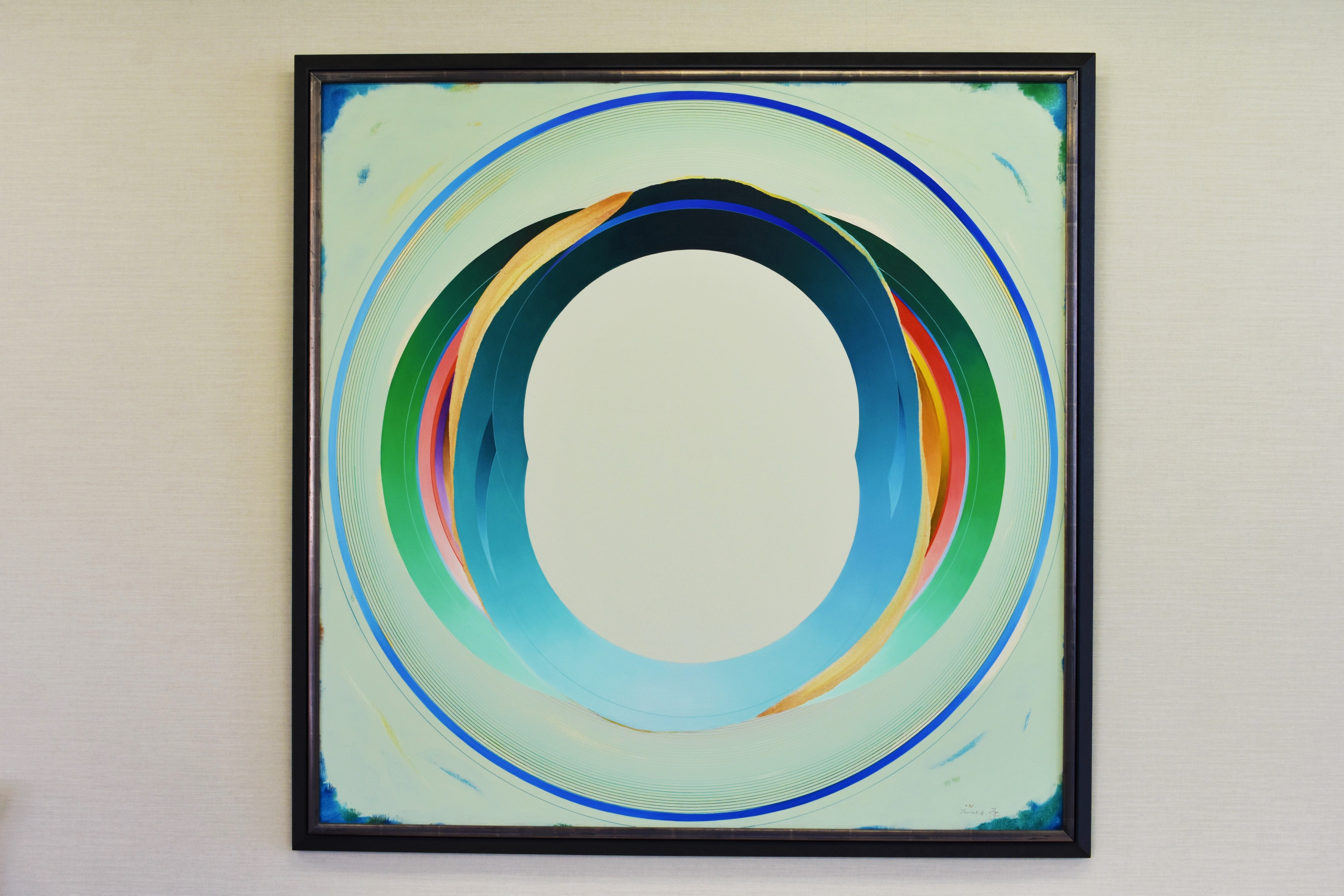
Toshiyuki Tanaka, from the Circle Period (blue), Japan Ultra-high Temperature Materials Research Institute in Ube City, Yamaguchi Prefecture

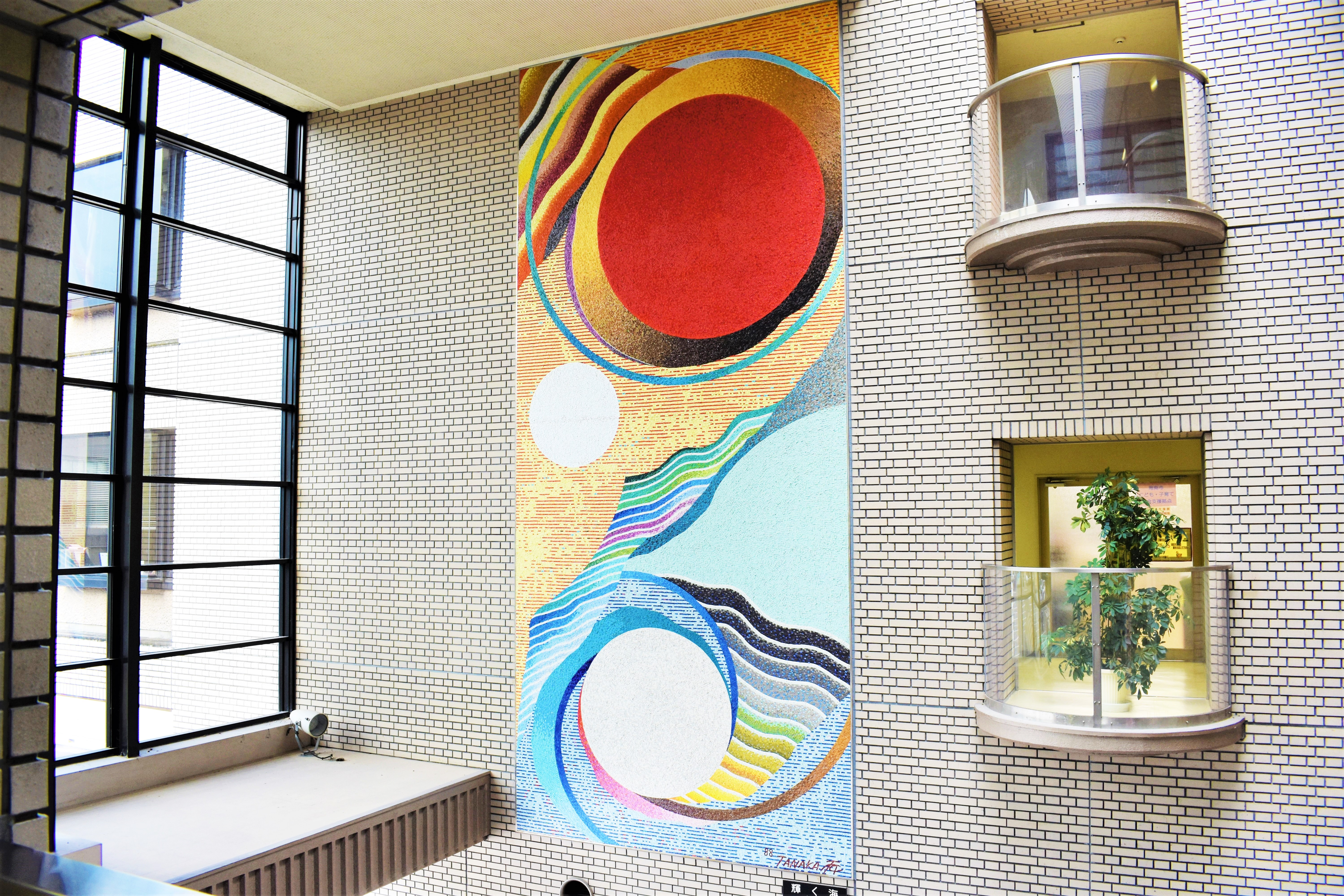
Toshiyuki Tanaka, 1988, Shining Sea, mosaic mural, Shunan City Tokuyama Health Center
