= Jōkō Obama =

Japanese politician and bureaucrat

- 小浜浄鉱
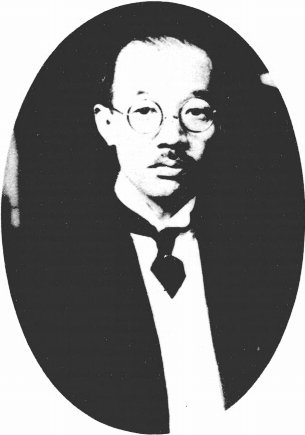
- Obama in c. 1934

Governor of Fukui Prefecture
- In office May 25, 1928 – August 26, 1930
- Monarch: Hirohito
- Preceded by: Keizō Ichimura
- Succeeded by: Naokitsu Tachibana

Chief of Internal Affairs Governor-General of Taiwan
- In office March 1932 – October 1936
- Monarch: Hirohito

Personal details
- Born: July 1886 Tokyo Prefecture, Japan
- Died: September 24, 1948 (aged 62)
- Parent: Sanjirō Obama (father)
- Education: Tokyo Imperial University
- Profession: Bureaucrat, politician

Jōkō Obama (小浜 浄鉱, Obama Jōkō (Note: Some sources have his surname written as 小濱, and some have it pronounced Kohama. Official records use 小浜 and Obama.); July 1886 – September 24, 1948) was a Japanese government bureaucrat. He was appointed governor of Fukui Prefecture and was the Chief of Internal Affairs for the Governor-General of Taiwan.

== Biography ==
Obama was born in Tokyo Prefecture, Japan in July 1886 as the fourth son of Sanjirō Obama (小濱三次郎, Obama Sanjirō). He graduated from High School No. 2 in Sendai-ku (now part of Sendai) in Miyagi Prefecture.

He graduated in 1912 from Tokyo Imperial University with degrees in law and economics and was appointed to the Home Ministry office in Toyama Prefecture. In November 1913, he passed with high marks the civil official exam for department administration. He was appointed the county administrator for Himi-gun in Toyama Prefecture in 1914. Several additional appoints followed: Prefectural Director for Hiroshima Prefecture, Prefectural Director for Hyougo Prefecture, Section Chief of the Health and Insurance Board in the Home Ministry, city welfare bureau chief, and other similar positions.

Obama was appointed Governor of Fukui Prefecture, serving from May 25, 1928, until August 26, 1930. He was preceded as Governor by Keizō Ichimura and was succeeded by Naokitsu Tachibana. He did not hold any public office between August 1930 and March 1932. He became the Chief of Internal Affairs for the Governor-General of Taiwan in March 1932, and held that office until October 1936. He retired from public office that same year.

He died on September 24, 1948.
