= Kyorin University =

Private university in Tokyo, Japan

Coordinates: 35°40′37″N 139°33′57″E

- 杏林大学
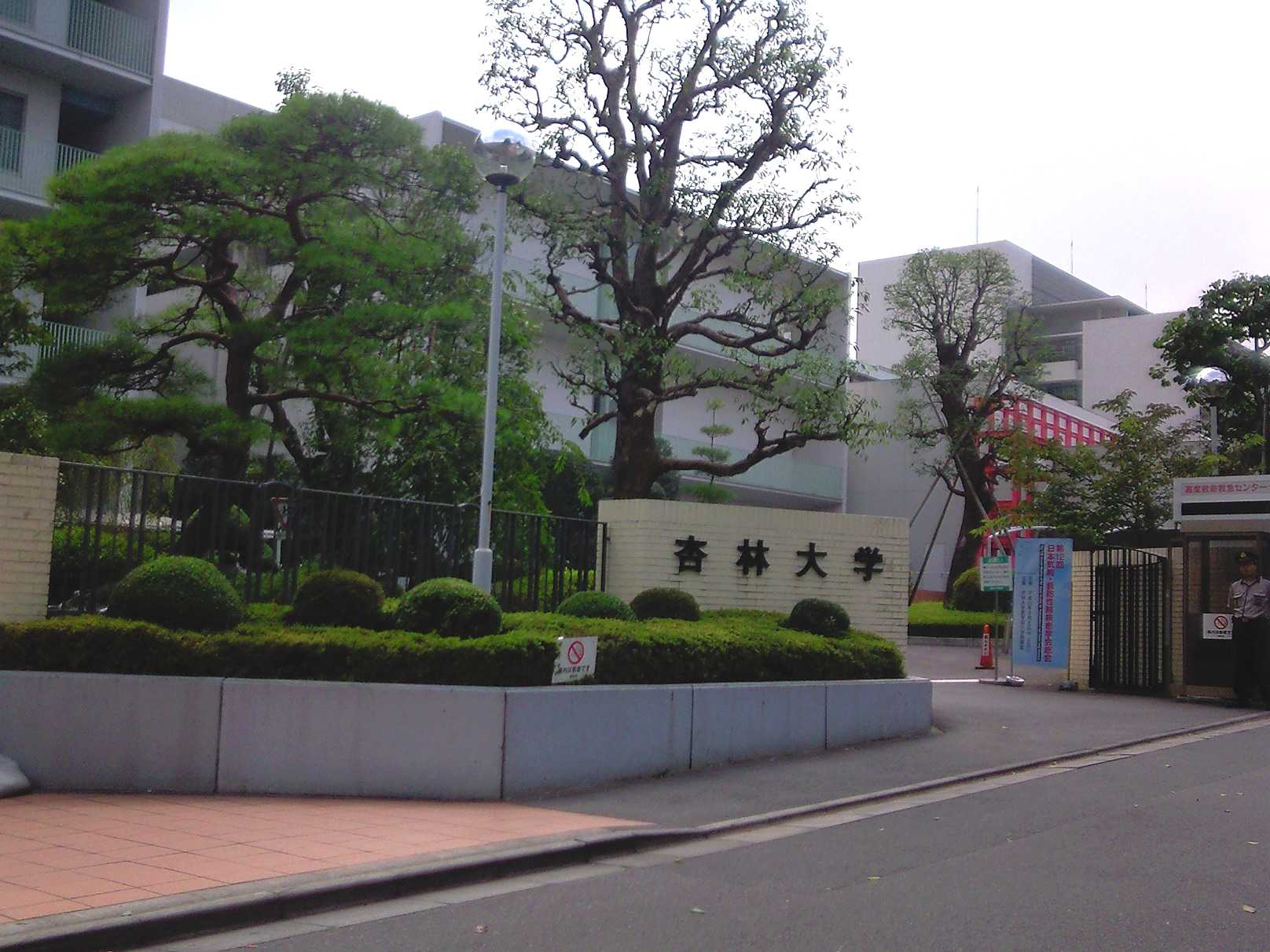
- Motto: Pursuit of Truth, Goodness, and Beauty
- Type: Private
- Established: 1970
- President: Yutaka Atomi
- Faculty: 980
- Administrative staff: 2,144
- Students: 4,856
- Undergraduates: 4,673
- Postgraduates: 183
- Location: Mitaka City-Mitaka (Headquarters)/ Inokashira (Other faculties); Hachiōji City-Hachiōji (Sports Ground only), Tokyo, Japan
- Campus: Urban
- Colors: green
- Website: kyorin-u.ac.jp

Kyorin University (杏林大学, Kyōrin daigaku) is a private university in the western part of Tokyo, Japan. Its three campuses are in Mitaka and Hachiōji, Tokyo. It was established in 1970. The predecessor of the school, Mitaka Shinkawa Hospital, was founded in 1953 by Shinyu Matsuda.

== History ==
Mitaka Shinkawa Hospital was founded in 1953 as a sanitarium for tuberculosis at the current location of the Mitaka campus of Kyorin University. Two years after, the training school for assistant nurses opened. The hospital added psychiatric and general medical wards, and, in 1963, Tokyo Mitaka Shinkawa General Hospital was chartered.

In 1966, Kyorin Educational Foundation was founded and Kyorin Junior College, which was reorganized to Faculty of Health Sciences of Kyorin University in 1979, started to develop Medical Laboratory Scientists. When Kyorin University School of Medicine was established in 1970, Tokyo Mitaka Shinkawa General Hospital was reconstituted as Kyorin University Hospital.

== Campus ==
- Mitaka Campus (Headquarters) – 6-20-2, Shinkawa, Mitaka City, Tokyo
- Inokashira Campus – 5-4-1, Shimorenjaku, Mitaka City, Tokyo
- Hachiōji Campus – 476, Miyashitamachi, Hachiōji City, Tokyo

== Organization ==
The university has four undergraduate faculties and three graduate schools.

=== Faculties and Departments ===
- Faculty of Foreign Studies
  - Department of Chinese Communication
  - Department of English Language
  - Department of Hospitality and Tourism
- Faculty of Health Sciences
  - Department of Clinical Engineering
  - Department of Health and Welfare
  - Department of Medical Radiological Technology
  - Department of Medical Technology
  - Department of Nursing
  - Department of Occupational Therapy
  - Department of Paramedics
  - Department of Physical Therapy
- Faculty of Medicine
  - Department of Medicine
- Faculty of Social Sciences
  - Department of Business Administration
  - Department of Policy Studies

=== Graduate Schools ===
- Graduate School of Health Sciences
- Graduate School of International Cooperation Studies
- Graduate School of Medicine
