= Masamoto Yashiro =

Japanese businessman (born 1929)

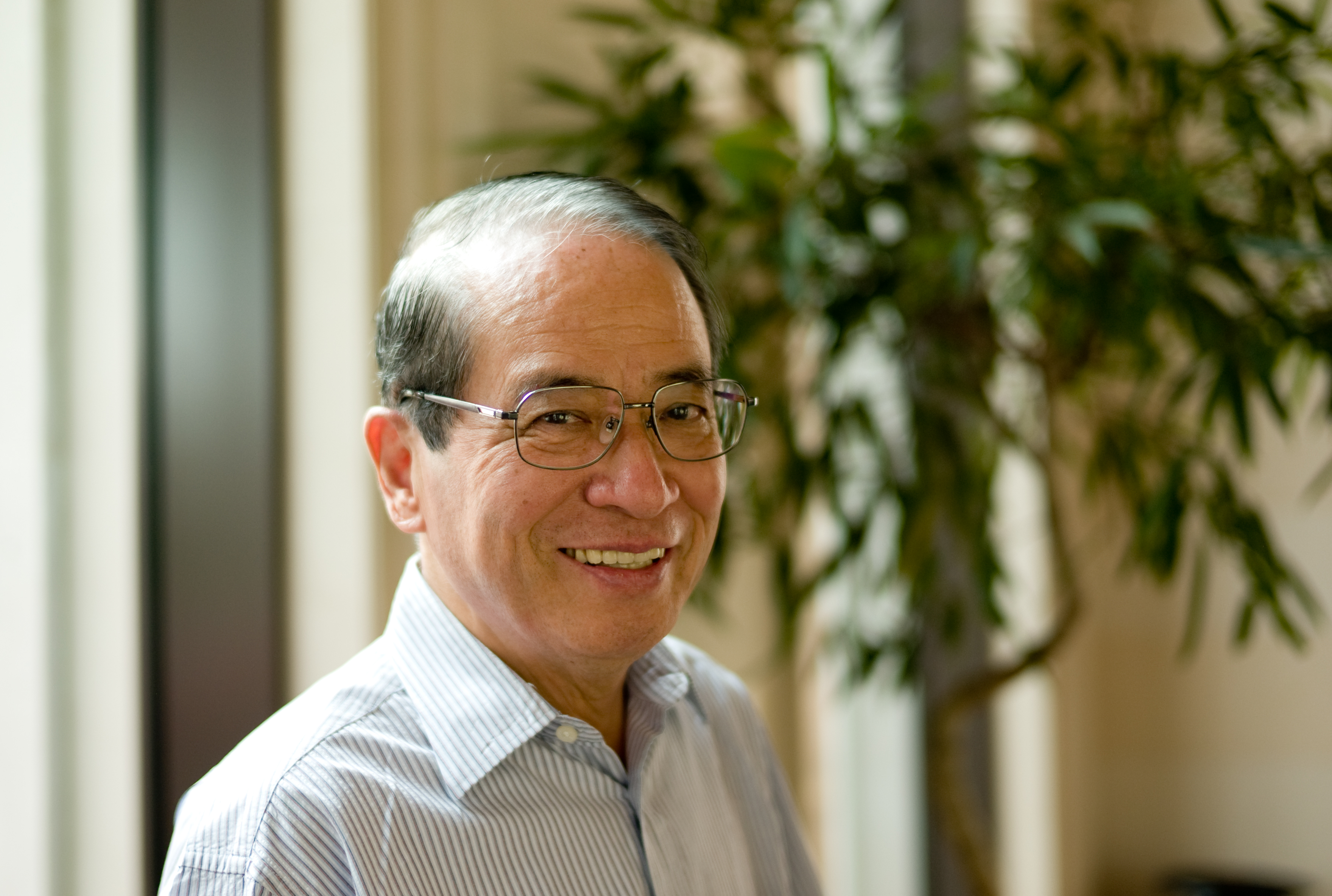
Masamoto Yashiro

Masamoto Yashiro (八城 政基, born February 14, 1929 in Shinagawa, Tokyo) is a Japanese businessman who is chairman and CEO of Shinsei Bank and a director of China Construction Bank.

He attended Kyoto University, graduating with a degree in law, and graduate school at the University of Tokyo. He joined Standard Vacuum Oil Company in 1958 and became a director of Esso Petroleum in 1964. He was appointed Japan chairman of Citibank in 1989.

In 1999, he left Citibank to head the Ripplewood-backed effort to acquire the Long-Term Credit Bank of Japan. In 2000, he was appointed chairman and CEO of the newly acquired and renamed Shinsei Bank. In 2004 he was also appointed as a director of China Construction Bank. He resigned as CEO of Shinsei in 2005 and as chairman in 2006, but returned as chairman and CEO in 2008.
