= Takeshi Inoue (footballer) =

Japanese footballer

Takeshi Inoue 井上 健
Personal information
- Full name: Takeshi Inoue
- Date of birth: September 30, 1928
- Place of birth: Nishinomiya, Hyogo, Empire of Japan
- Date of death: April 5, 1992 (aged 63)
- Place of death: Japan
- Position: Midfielder

Youth career
- Kobe Daiichi High School
- 1948–1951: Kwansei Gakuin University

Senior career*
Years	Team	Apps	(Gls)
1952–1960	New Mitsubishi Heavy Industries		

International career
1954	Japan	1	(0)
Medal record
All Kwangaku
Winner	Emperor's Cup	1955
- * Club domestic league appearances and goals

Takeshi Inoue (井上 健, Inoue Takeshi; September 30, 1928 – April 5, 1992) was a Japanese football player. He played for Japan national team.

== Club career ==
Inoue was born in Nishinomiya on September 30, 1928. After graduating from Kwansei Gakuin University, he played for New Mitsubishi Heavy Industries from 1952 to 1960. He also played for Kwangaku Club was consisted of his alma mater Kwansei Gakuin University players and graduates. At the club, he won 1955 Emperor's Cup.

== National team career ==
In March 1954, Inoue was selected Japan national team for 1954 World Cup qualification. At this qualification, on March 7, he debuted against South Korea.

Inoue died on April 5, 1992, at the age of 63.

== National team statistics ==
Japan national team
Year	Apps	Goals
1954	1	0
Total	1	0
