= 1946 in Japan =

- Decades: 1920s; 1930s; 1940s; 1950s; 1960s
- See also: Other events of 1946; History of Japan • Timeline • Years

Events in the year 1946 in Japan. It corresponds to Shōwa 21 (昭和21年) in the Japanese calendar.

Demographically, Showa Baby Boom Generation is a post-Japanese war demographic cohort, which approximately born between 1946 and 1953. It was fueled by returning soldiers, economic recovery, and post-war psychological shift towards rebuilding nation and starting families' and friends' new living together after the Constitution of Japan (1947) and the Treaty of San Francisco (1952). First Japanese Baby Boom Generation (1947-1949) is the core of this cohort, which saw births exceed 2.6 million annually, peaking with nearly 2.7 million births, for a total of about 8 million children born in just three years. They grew up during post-war recovery and Japanese economic miracle, and they experienced both hardships of immediate post-war food shortages and later economic boom. As they came of age during post-war period, Japanese economy and society changed to accommodate them. Major life events for this old Showa baby boom cohort, such as entering education system, workforce, and retirement, have created unique social and economic pressures, and as well as 1964 Tokyo Summer Olympic Games and university campus protests. Many individuals, who went to university or college were involved in a student radicalism and campus protests of late 1960s. They entered the workforce during a period of hyper-employment and labor shortages, contributing significantly to Japan's high economic growth. They were largely corporate employees, often identifying strongly with their work and believing in the concept of lifetime employment. Japanese Showa baby boom was much shorter and more "peaked" than global baby boom, making the demographic shift to an aging population more sudden in Japan. By this definition, as of 2013, there were about 15 million Japanese Showa baby boomers, which accounted for 11.7% of total population, out of 128 million people in Japan.

== Incumbents ==
- Emperor: Hirohito
- Prime Minister: Kijuro Shidehara, Shigeru Yoshida
- Supreme Commander Allied Powers: Douglas MacArthur

=== Governors ===
- Aichi Prefecture:
  - until 25 January: Ryuichi Fukumoto
  - 25 January-9 July: Saburo Hayakawa
  - starting 9 July: Mikine Kuwahara
- Akita Prefecture:
  - until 25 January: Kinsaburo Ikeda
  - 25 January-9 July: Iwao Isobe
  - starting 9 July: Hasuika Kosaku
- Aomori Prefecture: Motohiko Kanai (until 25 January); Renichi Ono (starting 25 January)
- Ehime Prefecture: Shotaro Toshima (until 4 October); Juushin Aoki (starting 4 October)
- Fukui Prefecture:
  - until 25 May: Eminai Miyata
  - 25 May-4 October: Saito Takeo
  - starting 4 October: Harukazu Obata
- Fukushima Prefecture: Masuda Kashinanatsu (until 25 April); Kanichiro Ishihara (starting 25 April)
- Gifu Prefecture: Yoshihira Nomura (until 16 February); Naomi Momoi (starting 16 February)
- Gunma Prefecture: Toshio Takahashi (until 25 January); Shigeo Kitano (starting 25 January)
- Hiroshima Prefecture: Tsunei Kusunose
- Ibaraki Prefecture: Yoji Tomosue
- Iwate Prefecture: Tamemasu Miyata (until 26 January); Haruhiko Ichi (starting 26 January)
- Kagawa Prefecture: Shogo Tanaka
- Kochi Prefecture: Nagano Yoshitatsu
- Kumamoto Prefecture:
  - until 25 January: Hirai Fumi
  - 25 January-9 July: Hiroshi Nagai
  - starting 9 July: Saburo Sakurai
- Kyoto Prefecture: Atsushi Kimura
- Mie Prefecture: Kobayashi Chiaki
- Miyagi Prefecture: Saburo Chiba
- Miyazaki Prefecture: Tadao Annaka
- Nagano Prefecture: Monobe Kaoruro
- Niigata Prefecture:
  - until 25 January: Hatada Masatomi
  - 25 January-9 July: Sato Dodai
  - starting 9 July: Hideo Aoki
- Okinawa Prefecture: Koshin Shikiya (until 24 April)
- Saga Prefecture: Miyazaki Kenta (until 4 July); Genichi Okimori (starting 4 July)
- Saitama Prefecture: Sekigaiyo Otoko (until 25 January); Jitzuzo Nishimura (starting 25 January)
- Shiname Prefecture:
  - until 25 January: Kiyoshi Ito
  - 25 January-8 June: Mikio Suzuki
  - starting 8 June: Muneo Tokanai
- Tochigi Prefecture: Soma Toshio
- Tokyo:
  - until 15 January: Shohei Fujinuma
  - 15 January-8 June: Haruo Matsui
  - starting 8 June: Seiichiro Yasui
- Toyama Prefecture:
  - until 25 January: Keiichi Yoshitake
  - 25 January-9 July: Keiichi Tanaki
  - starting 9 July: Keiji Ishimura
- Yamagata Prefecture: Michio Murayama (until 25 October); Yoshio Miura (starting 25 October)

== Events ==
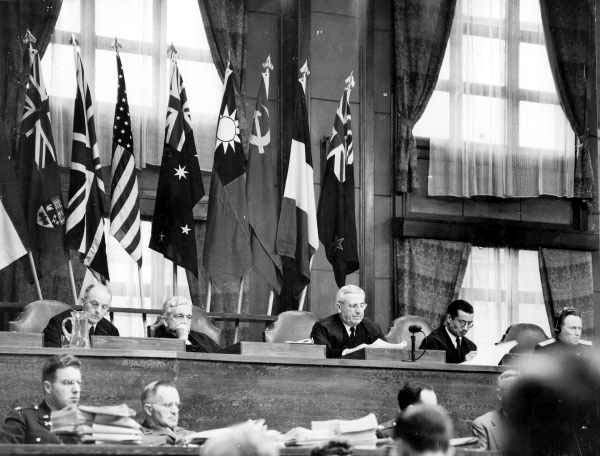
International Military Tribunal for the Far East convened in May

- January 1: Emperor Shōwa renounces his divinity, known in Japanese as the Human Declaration
- January 4: The Supreme Commander of the Allied Powers, General Douglas MacArthur order the Japanese government to expel all militarists from positions of power. The disbandment of all ultra-nationalist organizations is also ordered.
- March 2: Kose Cosmetics founded in Oji region, Tokyo, as predecessor name was Kobayashi Kose Cosmetics.
- April 10: The Diet elections (a lower House of Representatives and upper House of Peers). Liberal Party wins 141 of 466 Diet seats, followed by the Progressive Party with 94 and the Socialist Party with 93.
- April 16: Kijuro Shidehara resigns as president of the Progressive Party, and as prime minister effective April 22.
- April 22: Sazae-san is first published.
- May 2: Ichiro Hatoyama receives Imperial Order to form a cabinet.
- May 3: International Military Tribunal for the Far East convenes.
- May 4: Supreme Commander of the Allied Powers ("SCAP") purges Hatoyama.
- May 7: Tokyo Tsushin Kogyo, the predecessor of Sony, is founded.
- May 16: Shigeru Yoshida receives Imperial Order to form a cabinet.
- May 22: Yoshida cabinet announced.
- June 20: Emperor Hirohito submits a revision of the Imperial Constitution to the Diet.
- August 16: Keidanren established.
- August 20: Serial killer Yoshio Kodaira is arrested.
- November 3: Constitution of Japan promulgated.
- December 21: The Nankai earthquake strikes Wakayama Prefecture, killing at least one thousand people and destroying 36,000 homes.

== Births ==
- January 2: Gorou Ibuki, actor
- February 3: Takako Iida, volleyball player
- February 19: Hiroshi Fujioka, actor
- February 22: Kumiko Sato, figure skater
- February 23: Ryudō Uzaki, singer-songwriter
- March 4: Kiyoshi Nakajō, enka singer
- March 21: Yumiko Kokonoe, actress and singer
- April 5: Takurō Yoshida, singer-songwriter
- May 7: Man Arai, composer, writer and singer (d. 2021)
- June 1: Yūko Shiokawa, violinist
- June 2: Tomomichi Nishimura, voice actor
- June 6
  - Masaaki Sakai, singer and actor
  - Mie Nakao, singer and actress
- June 9: Kazumi Takahashi, former professional baseball pitcher (d. 2015)
- July 1: Masaharu Satō, voice actor
- July 16: Toshio Furukawa, voice actor and narrator
- August 2: Kenji Nakagami, novelist and essayist (d. 1992)
- August 6: Ichikawa Danjūrō, actor (d. 2013)
- August 18: Masaaki Ikenaga, former professional baseball pitcher (d. 2022)
- August 21: Norio Yoshimizu, football player
- September 18: Akira Kamiya, voice actor
- September 24: Kōichi Tabuchi, former professional baseball player
- October 10: Naoto Kan, politician and prime minister of Japan
- October 11: Sawao Katō, gymnast
- October 25: Kōji Yamamoto, former professional baseball player and coach
- October 30: Katsuhisa Hōki, actor and voice actor
- November 3: Wataru Takeshita, politician (d. 2021)
- November 4: Isamu Sonoda, judoka
- November 6: Tsuguhiko Kozuka, figure skater
- November 13: Reiko Ohara, actress (d. 2009)
- November 14: Kai Atō, actor and TV presenter (d. 2015)
- November 22: Mitsuko Baisho, actress
- November 28: Kazuhiro Ninomiya, judoka
- December 4: Yō Inoue, voice actress (d. 2003)
- December 14: Hiroshi Nagakubo, pair skater

== Deaths ==
- January 30: Kan Abe, politician (b. 1894)
- February 10: Mushitaro Oguri, novelist (b. 1901)
- February 13: Tamotsu Oishi, career officer (b. 1900)
- February 23: Tomoyuki Yamashita, general (b. 1885)
- April 3: Masaharu Homma, lieutenant general (b. 1887)
- April 5: Fujiro Katsurada, parasitologist (b. 1867)
- April 19: Rikichi Andō, general (b. 1884)
- May 26: Tamaki Miura, operatic soprano (b. 1884)
- June 12: Hisaichi Terauchi, marshal (b. 1879)
- June 26: Yōsuke Matsuoka, diplomat and Minister of Foreign Affairs (b. 1880)
- August 16: Prince Fushimi Hiroyasu (b. 1875)
- September 21: Mansaku Itami, film director (b. 1900)
- September 24: Yoshio Tachibana, lieutenant general (b. 1890)
- September 30: Takashi Sakai, lieutenant general (b. 1887)
- December 7: Sada Yacco, geisha, actress and dancer (b. 1871)
- December 12: Gennosuke Fuse, anatomist (b. 1880)

== See also ==
- List of Japanese films of the 1940s
