= 1932 in Japan =

- Decades: 1910s; 1920s; 1930s; 1940s; 1950s
- See also: Other events of 1932; History of Japan; Timeline; Years

Events in the year 1932 in Japan.

== Incumbents ==
- Emperor: Hirohito
- Prime Minister:
  - Inukai Tsuyoshi: until May 15
  - Takahashi Korekiyo: (Acting) May 15 – May 26
  - Saitō Makoto: from May 26
- Foreign Minister:
  - Saitō Makoto: until July
  - Uchida Kosai
- Finance Minister: Takahashi Korekiyo

=== Governors ===
- Aichi Prefecture: Yujiro Osaki (until 28 June); Endo Ryusaku (starting 28 June)
- Akita Prefecture: Takeshi Uchida (until 28 June); Takabe Rokuzo (starting 28 June)
- Aomori Prefecture: Teizaburo Miyamoto (until 28 June); Taku Yasunobu (starting 28 June)
- Ehime Prefecture: Kume Shigeo (until 28 June); Jiro Ichinohe (starting 28 June)
- Fukui Prefecture: Keizo Ichimura (until 8 March); Shigeo Odachi (starting 8 March)
- Fukushima Prefecture: Murai Hachiro (until 28 June); Akagi Tomoharo (starting 28 June)
- Gifu Prefecture: Takehiko Ito (until 28 June); Umekichi Miyawaki (starting 28 June)
- Gunma Prefecture: Masao Kanazawa
- Hiroshima Prefecture: Ryo Chiba (until 28 June); Michio Yuzawa (starting 28 June)
- Ibaraki Prefecture: Seikichi Kimishima (until 18 June); Abe Kashichi (starting 18 June)
- Iwate Prefecture: Hidehiko Ishiguro
- Kagawa Prefecture: Akira Ito (until 28 June); Seikichi Kimijima (starting 28 June)
- Kanagawa Prefecture: Sukenari Yokoyama (starting month unknown)
- Kochi Prefecture: Kodora Akamatsu (until 4 March); Sakama Osamu (starting 4 March)
- Kumamoto Prefecture: Kenichi Yamashita (until 28 June); Keiichi Suzuki (starting 28 June)
- Kyoto Prefecture: Sukenari Yokoyama (until 28 June); Saito Munenori (starting 28 June)
- Mie Prefecture: Hirose Hisatada
- Miyagi Prefecture: Michio Yuzawa
- Miyazaki Prefecture: Gisuke Kinoshita
- Nagano Prefecture: Ishigaki Kuraji
- Niigata Prefecture: Toyoji Obata (until 28 June); Ryo Chiba (starting 28 June)
- Okinawa Prefecture: Jiro Ino
- Osaka Prefecture: Saito Munenori (until month unknown); Shinobu Agata (starting month unknown)
- Saga Prefecture: Saburo Hayakawa
- Saitama Prefecture: Umekichi Miyawaki (until 28 June); Shigezo Fukushima (starting 28 June)
- Shiname Prefecture: Rinsaku Yagi (starting 28 June); Masaki Fukumura (starting 28 June)
- Tochigi Prefecture: Chokichi Toshima (until 28 June); Nakarai Kiyoshi (starting 28 June)
- Tokyo:
  - until 12 January: Hasegawa Hisakazu
  - 12 January-27 May: Shohei Fujinuma
  - starting 27 May: Masayasu Kouksaka
- Toyama Prefecture: Keiichi Suzuki (until 28 June); Saito Itsuki (starting 28 June)
- Yamagata Prefecture: Sada Kawamura (until 28 June); Ishihara Yajiro (starting 28 June)

== Events ==
- January 9 – Sakuradamon Incident (1932)
- January 25 – Nippon Bakelight, later Sumitomo Bakelight was founded.
- January 25–February 4 – Defense of Harbin
- January 28–March 3 – January 28 Incident
- February 20 – 1932 Japanese general election
- May 15 – May 15 Incident
- July 15 – Takashimaya Department Store in Osaka Nanba was officially open.
- August 12 – Tokyo Takarazuka Cinema Production, as predecessor of Toho was founded.
- September 1 – Topcon was founded.
- September 15 – the Japan-Manchukuo Protocol is signed by Japan giving Japanese forces permission to station in Manchukuo
- December 16 – Shirokiya Department Store fire
- Winter – The Japanese Communist Party make a concerted effort to reestablish its central organization during a time of police repression
- Unknown date
  - Pharmacy retailer, Matsumoto Kiyoshi founded in Matsudo, Chiba Prefecture, as predecessor name was Matsumoto Pharmacy Shop.
  - Nanzan Secondary School, later Nanzan University was founded in Nagoya.

== Films ==
- Chûshingura – directed by Teinosuke Kinugasa
- First Steps Ashore – directed by Yasujirô Shimazu
- I Was Born, But... – directed by Yasujirō Ozu
- Kokushi muso – directed by Mansaku Itami
- Manmo kenkoku no reimei – directed by Kenji Mizoguchi
- Nasanunaka – directed by Mikio Naruse
- Spring Comes from the Ladies – directed by Yasujirô Ozu
- Until the Day We Meet Again – directed by Yasujirô Ozu
- Uzumaki – directed by Hiroshi Innami
- Where Now Are the Dreams of Youth – directed by Yasujirō Ozu

== Births ==
- January 11 – Takkō Ishimori, voice actor (d. 2013)
- January 30 – Kazuo Inamori, philanthropist, entrepreneur, Zen Buddhist priest, and both founder of Kyocera and KDDI (d. 2022)
- March 7 – Momoko Kōchi, actress (d. 1998)
- March 26 – Katsumoto Saotome, writer and pacifist (d. 2022)
- March 31 – Nagisa Oshima, film director and screenwriter (d. 2013)
- April 3 – Ineko Arima, film actress
- April 4 – Meisei Goto, author (d. 1999)
- April 16 – Shigeko Sasamori, Hiroshima bombing survivor and peace/anti-nuclear activist (d. 2024)
- June 24 – Hirohisa Fujii, politician and former Finance Minister (d. 2022)
- June 25 – Ichiro Ogimura, table tennis player (d. 1994)
- August 11
  - Asei Kobayashi, composer and lyricist (d. 2021)
  - Keiko Kishi, film actress, writer, and UNFPA Goodwill Ambassador
- September 10 – Yasuo Yamada, voice actor (d. 1995)
- September 18 – Hisashi Owada, diplomat and law professor
- September 30 – Shintarō Ishihara, Japanese author and politician (d. 2022)
- October 2 – Masanobu Deme, film director (d. 2016)
- November 20
  - Umeko Ando, Ainu singer and musician (d. 2004)
  - Yorozuya Kinnosuke, kabuki actor (d. 1996)
- November 23 – Kunie Tanaka, film actor (d. 2021)
- December 13 – Tatsuya Nakadai, film actor (d. 2025)
- December 25 – Jun Etō, literary critic (d. 1999)

== Deaths ==
- February 9 – Junnosuke Inoue, businessman and banker (assassinated) (b. 1869)
- March 5 – Dan Takuma, businessman (assassinated) (b. 1858)
- March 24 – Motojirō Kajii, writer (b. 1901)
- March 26 – Kigoshi Yasutsuna, general (b. 1854)
- May 15 – Inukai Tsuyoshi, politician and Prime Minister of Japan (assassinated) (b. 1855)
- May 26 – Yoshinori Shirakawa, general, (b. 1869)
- June 14 – Yamamoto Yaeko, nurse, wife of Joseph Hardy Neesima (b. 1845)
- July 24 – Hidaka Sōnojō, admiral (b. 1848)

== See also ==
- 1932 in Japanese football
- List of Japanese films of the 1930s
