= 1948 in Japan =

- Decades: 1920s; 1930s; 1940s; 1950s; 1960s
- See also: Other events of 1948; History of Japan • Timeline • Years

Events in the year 1948 in Japan.

== Incumbents ==
- Supreme Commander Allied Powers: Douglas MacArthur
- Emperor: Hirohito
- Prime Minister: Tetsu Katayama (S–Kanagawa) until March 10, Hitoshi Ashida (D–Kyōto) until October 15, Shigeru Yoshida (L–Kōchi, 2nd term, 1st under the Constitution of the State of Japan)
- Chief Cabinet Secretary: Suehiro Nishio (S–Ōsaka) until March 10, Gizō Tomabechi (D–Aomori) until October 15, Eisaku Satō (not Diet member) from October 17
- Chief Justice of the Supreme Court: Tadahiko Mibuchi
- President of the House of Representatives: Komakichi Matsuoka (S–Tokyo) until December 23
- President of the House of Councillors: Tsuneo Matsudaira (Ryokufūkai–Fukushima)
- Diet sessions: 2nd (regular session opened in December 1947, to July 5), 3rd (extraordinary, October 11 to November 30), 4th (regular, from December 1 to dissolution on December 23)

=== Governors ===
- Aichi Prefecture: Hideo Aoyagi
- Akita Prefecture: Kosaku Hasuike
- Aomori Prefecture: Bunji Tsushima
- Chiba Prefecture: Tamenosuke Kawaguchi
- Ehime Prefecture: Juushin Aoki
- Fukui Prefecture: Harukazu Obata
- Fukuoka Prefecture: Katsuji Sugimoto
- Fukushima Prefecture: Kan'ichirō Ishihara
- Gifu Prefecture: Kamon Muto
- Gunma Prefecture: Shigeo Kitano (until 25 June); Yoshio Iyoku (starting 13 August)
- Hiroshima Prefecture: Tsunei Kusunose
- Hokkaido Prefecture: Toshifumi Tanaka
- Hyogo Prefecture: Yukio Kishida
- Ibaraki Prefecture: Yoji Tomosue
- Ishikawa Prefecture: Wakio Shibano
- Iwate Prefecture: Kenkichi Kokubun
- Kagawa Prefecture: Keikichi Masuhara
- Kagoshima Prefecture: Kaku Shigenari
- Kanagawa Prefecture: Iwataro Uchiyama
- Kochi Prefecture: Wakaji Kawamura
- Kumamoto Prefecture: Saburō Sakurai
- Kyoto Prefecture: Atsushi Kimura
- Mie Prefecture: Masaru Aoki
- Miyagi Prefecture: Saburō Chiba
- Miyazaki Prefecture: Tadao Annaka
- Nagano Prefecture: Torao Hayashi
- Nagasaki Prefecture: Sōjirō Sugiyama
- Nara Prefecture: Mansaku Nomura
- Niigata Prefecture: Shohei Okada
- Oita Prefecture: Tokuju Hosoda
- Okayama Prefecture: Hirokichi Nishioka
- Osaka Prefecture: Bunzō Akama
- Saga Prefecture: Gen'ichi Okimori
- Saitama Prefecture: Mizo Nishimura
- Shiga Prefecture: Iwakichi Hattori
- Shiname Prefecture: Fujiro Hara
- Shizuoka Prefecture: Takeji Kobayashi
- Tochigi Prefecture: Juukichi Kodaira
- Tokushima Prefecture: Goro Abe
- Tokyo Prefecture: Seiichirō Yasui
- Tottori Prefecture: Aiji Nishio
- Toyama Prefecture: Tetsuji Tachi (until 15 November); Kunitake Takatsuji (starting 23 November)
- Wakayama Prefecture: Shinji Ono
- Yamagata Prefecture: Michio Murayama
- Yamaguchi Prefecture: Tatsuo Tanaka
- Yamanashi Prefecture: Katsuyasu Yoshie

== Events ==
- January 1: The Nijūbashi Bridge, a well known double arched stone bridge located between the front and middle gates of the Imperial Palace, is opened to the public
- January 4: International telephone service between the United States and Japan is established.
- January 5: According to Japan Transport Ministry official confirmed report, when a commuter train was running, following to two passenger cars were derail with damage in Meitetsu Seto Line, Moriyama-ku, Nagoya, 36 persons were fatalities, 153 persons were wounded.
- January 27 – According to Japan Coast Guard official confirmed report, a passenger ship Joou Maru toward from Osaka to Tadotsu, Kagawa Prefecture route, capsized by touch on landmine off north of Shōdo Island, Seto Inland Sea, 154 persons were official rescue confirmed, 199 passenger and crew were perished.
- February 9 – Fujitec was founded, as predecessor name was Fuji Transport Machinery Industry in Nishi-ku, Osaka.
- March 9 – Yamazaki Baking founded in Ichikawa, Chiba Prefecture.
- March 10: Hitoshi Ashida becomes prime minister
- March 31: According to Japan Transport Ministry official confirmed report, an out of control device commuter train, collision with a standing commuter train in Kawachi-Hanazono Station, Kintetsu Nara Line, Kawachi (now Higashiosaka), Osaka Prefecture, 49 persons were human fatalities.
- May 1: Japan Coast Guard founded.
- June 28: 1948 Fukui earthquake
- August 1: A first issue of Daily Sports published in Kobe.
- August 19 – A sitdown strike at Toho film studio ended after the studio was surrounded by 2,000 police and a platoon of U.S. Eighth Army soldiers.
- September 17: According to Japanese government official document figures, a flooding river, levee collapse in around Kitakami River area by strong Typhoon Ione hit in northern Honshu, total 848 persons were lost to their lives with 1,956 persons were hurt.
- September 24: Honda Motor Company founded.
- October 5: Ashida cabinet resigns.
- October 15: Shigeru Yoshida becomes prime minister for a second term.
- November 1: Kataoka Electronic Company, later Alps Alpine was founded.
- November 12: International Military Tribunal for the Far East hands down death sentences for 7 war criminals and imprisonment for 18 others.
- December 7: Ashida arrested in connection with the Showa Electric scandal

== Births ==
- January 13: Shinji Sōmai, film director (died 2001)
- January 18: Ryoko Moriyama, singer
- January 24: Machiko Satonaka, manga writer
- January 29: Mamoru Mori, astronaut
- January 31: Muneo Suzuki, politician
- February 13: Eizo Kenmotsu, gymnast
- February 15: Seiji Oko, volleyball player
- February 19: Kazuo Zaitsu, singer-songwriter
- March 8: Kiyomi Kato, wrestler
- March 26: Ayumi Ishida, singer and actress
- March 28: Takashi Hanyūda, politician
- April 12: Tatsue Kaneda, enka singer
- April 16: Kazuyuki Sogabe, voice actor (died 2006)
- May 15
  - Yutaka Enatsu, former professional baseball pitcher
  - Kiyoshi Ueda, politician and former Saitama governor
- May 26: Jyun Mayuzumi, singer
- June 8: Naomi Miyake, cognitive scientist (died 2015)
- June 25: Kenji Sawada, singer
- July 13: Chinatsu Nakayama, writer and former politician
- July 22: Toshio Tamogami, Air Self-Defense Force career military officer
- August 8: Bibari Maeda, actress
- August 30: Yōsui Inoue, singer-songwriter
- October 20: Jun Maki, copywriter (died 2009)
- November 3: Takashi Kawamura, politician
- November 12: Banjō Ginga, voice actor
- November 15: Hiroe Yuki, badminton player (died 2011)
- November 29: Yōichi Masuzoe, politician
- December 6: Yoshihide Suga, former Prime Minister of Japan
- December 11: Shinji Tanimura, singer-songwriter (died 2023)
- December 18: Yōichi Fukunaga, former jockey
- December 20: Mitsuko Uchida, pianist
- Date unknown: Tetsuji Oda, electrical engineer and researcher

== Deaths ==
- March 6 – Kan Kikuchi, writer and novelist (b. 1888)
- April 12 – Masaomi Yasuoka, lieutenant general (b. 1886)
- April 17 – Kantarō Suzuki, admiral and former prime minister (b. 1868)
- April 20 – Mitsumasa Yonai, admiral and former prime minister (b. 1880)
- June 13 – Osamu Dazai, novelist (suicide) (b. 1909)
- December 23 – Japanese war leaders (hanged):
  - Hideki Tōjō, general and former prime minister (b. 1884)
  - Seishirō Itagaki general (b. 1885)
  - Heitarō Kimura, general (b. 1888)
  - Kenji Doihara, general (b. 1883)
  - Kōki Hirota, diplomat and former prime minister (b. 1878)
  - Iwane Matsui, general (b. 1878)
  - Akira Mutō, general (b. 1892)

== See also ==
- List of Japanese films of the 1940s
