= 1997 in Japan =

- Decades: 1970s; 1980s; 1990s; 2000s; 2010s
- See also: Other events of 1997; History of Japan • Timeline • Years

Events in the year 1997 in Japan. It corresponds to the year Heisei 9 (平成9年) in the Japanese calendar.

== Incumbents ==
- Emperor: Akihito
- Prime Minister: Ryutaro Hashimoto (L–Okayama)
- Chief Cabinet Secretary: Seiroku Kajiyama (L–Ibaraki) until September 11, Kanezō Muraoka (L–Akita)
- Chief Justice of the Supreme Court: Toru Miyoshi until October 30, Shigeru Yamaguchi from October 31
- President of the House of Representatives: Sōichirō Itō (L–Miyagi)
- President of the House of Councillors: Jūrō Saitō (L–Mie)
- Diet sessions: 140th (regular, January 20 to June 18), 141st (extraordinary, September 29 to December 12)

=== Governors ===
- Aichi Prefecture: Reiji Suzuki
- Akita Prefecture: Kikuji Sasaki (until 31 March); Sukeshiro Terata (starting 23 April)
- Aomori Prefecture: Takeshi Numata
- Chiba Prefecture: Akiko Dōmoto
- Ehime Prefecture: Sadayuki Iga
- Fukui Prefecture: Yukio Kurita
- Fukuoka Prefecture: Wataru Asō
- Fukushima Prefecture: Eisaku Satō
- Gifu Prefecture: Taku Kajiwara
- Gunma Prefecture: Hiroyuki Kodera
- Hiroshima Prefecture: Yūzan Fujita
- Hokkaido: Tatsuya Hori
- Hyogo Prefecture: Toshitami Kaihara
- Ibaraki Prefecture: Masaru Hashimoto
- Ishikawa Prefecture: Masanori Tanimoto
- Iwate Prefecture: Hiroya Masuda
- Kagawa Prefecture: Jōichi Hirai
- Kagoshima Prefecture: Tatsurō Suga
- Kanagawa Prefecture: Hiroshi Okazaki
- Kochi Prefecture: Daijiro Hashimoto
- Kumamoto Prefecture: Joji Fukushima
- Kyoto Prefecture: Teiichi Aramaki
- Mie Prefecture: Masayasu Kitagawa
- Miyagi Prefecture: Shirō Asano
- Miyazaki Prefecture: Suketaka Matsukata
- Nagano Prefecture: Gorō Yoshimura
- Nagasaki Prefecture: Isamu Takada
- Nara Prefecture: Yoshiya Kakimoto
- Niigata Prefecture: Ikuo Hirayama
- Oita Prefecture: Morihiko Hiramatsu
- Okayama Prefecture: Masahiro Ishii
- Okinawa Prefecture: Masahide Ōta
- Osaka Prefecture: Knock Yokoyama
- Saga Prefecture: Isamu Imoto
- Saitama Prefecture: Yoshihiko Tsuchiya
- Shiga Prefecture: Minoru Inaba
- Shiname Prefecture: Nobuyoshi Sumita
- Shizuoka Prefecture: Yoshinobu Ishikawa
- Tochigi Prefecture: Fumio Watanabe
- Tokushima Prefecture: Toshio Endo
- Tokyo: Yukio Aoshima
- Tottori Prefecture: Yuji Nishio
- Toyama Prefecture: Yutaka Nakaoki
- Wakayama Prefecture: Isamu Nishiguchi
- Yamagata Prefecture: Kazuo Takahashi
- Yamaguchi Prefecture: Sekinari Nii
- Yamanashi Prefecture: Ken Amano

== Events ==
- January 2 – Oil spill in Sea of Japan near the Oki Islands from the Russian crude oil tanker, Nakhodka.
- February 1 – 1997 Aisin fire
- February 7 – MDM Corporation, as predecessor for Rakuten, founded in Tokyo.
- March 1 – Osaka Dome, a baseball stadium in Osaka, is completed.
- April 1 – The consumption tax rate is raised from 3 to 5%.
- May 8 – The Japanese Diet passes the Ainu Culture Law and repeals the Ainu Protection Act.
- May 30 – Nippon Kaigi is organized.
- July 2 – Diamond Grace, a Japanese-operated Panamian-registered tanker struck the Nakanose reef in Tokyo Bay and caused an oil spill. Prime Minister Ryutaro Hashimoto declared the incident a national emergency.
- July 10 – Debris blown by heavy rain in Harihara, Izumi, Kagoshima, kills 21, injures 13.
- July 12 – Hayao Miyazaki's anime film Princess Mononoke is released in cinemas.
- October 1 – Nagano Shinkansen open between Takasaki to Nagano, with Tokyo to Nagano direct high-speed rail train start.
- October 11 – The mixed martial arts organization PRIDE Fighting Championships holds its inaugural event at the Tokyo Dome in Tokyo, Japan. In the main event Rickson Gracie defeats Nobuhiko Takada by armbar.
- November – Financial institutions bankruptcy is linked, include Yamaichi Securities, Hokkaido Takushoku Bank, Sanyo securities and Tokuyo City Bank.
- December 11 – Framework Convention on Climate Change Conference of the Parties held in Kyoto. As a result of the meeting, the Kyoto Protocol to impose greenhouse gas emission reduction targets was adopted.
- December 16 – "Dennō Senshi Porygon", an episode of the Pokémon TV series, is aired in Japan, inducing seizures in hundreds of Japanese children.
- December 18 – Tokyo Bay Aqua-Line opens.
- The Toyota Prius, the first hybrid vehicle to go into full production, is unveiled in Japan on October 24, and goes on sale in Japan on December 9. It comes to U.S. showrooms on July 11, 2000.

== Births ==
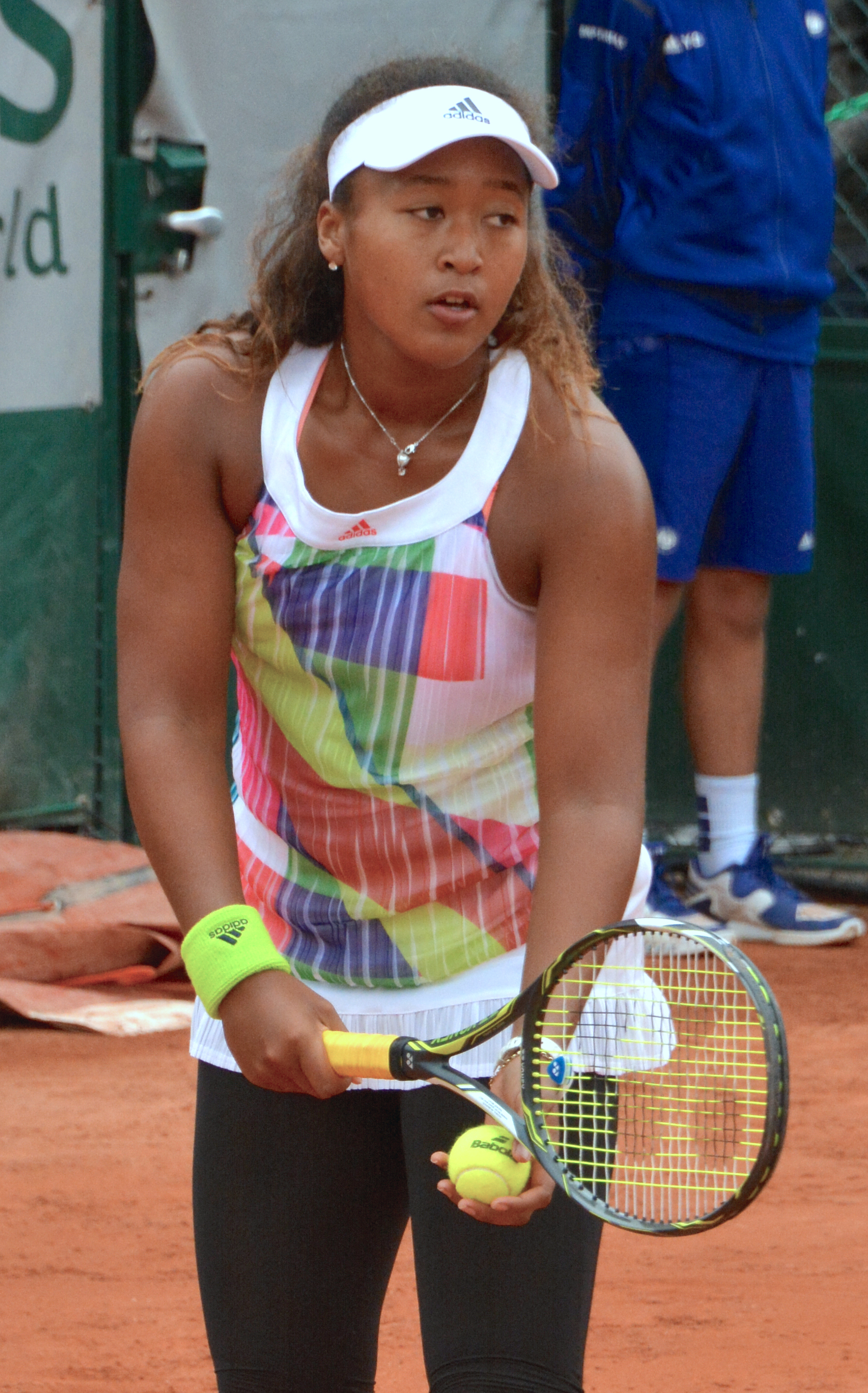
Naomi Osaka

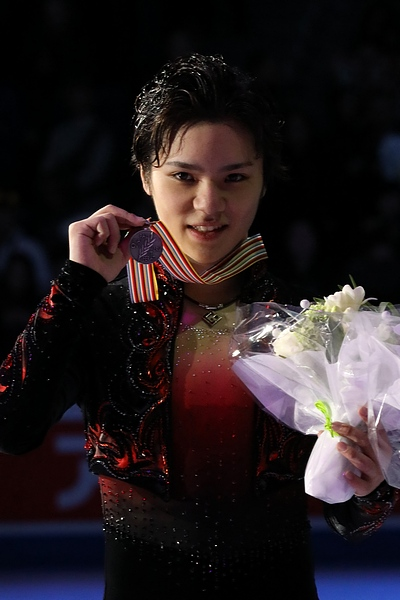
Shoma Uno

- January 7 – Ayumi Ishida, singer
- January 10 – Ayuri Konno, actress
- January 22 – Erika Ikuta, actress
- January 30 – Taisei Marukawa, Indonesian footballer
- February 1 – Yūki Takahashi, professional baseball pitcher
- February 4 – Ayami Nakajō, actress and model
- February 23 – Shiena Nishizawa, singer
- March 3 – Momoka Muraoka, para alpine skier
- March 4 – Daoko, singer
- March 7 – Miki Honoka, actress
- March 8 – Jurina Matsui, singer
- March 24 – Mina, singer and member of K-pop girl group Twice
- April 9 – Haruna Suzuki, figure skater
- April 21 – Yuki Tanigawa, Malaysian footballer
- April 27 – Sayuki Takagi, singer
- May 7 – Irori Maeda, singer
- May 20 – Kaoru Mitoma, footballer
- June 4
  - Riho, professional wrestler
  - Kana Nakanishi, singer
- June 6 – Akane Yamaguchi, badminton player
- June 14 – Fujii Kaze, singer-songwriter
- July 7 – Erina Ikuta, singer
- July 10 – Rena Katō, singer
- August 10 – Sara Takatsuki, actress, model and singer
- September 3 – Hana Kimura, professional wrestler (d. 2020)
- September 6 – Tsukushi, professional wrestler
- October 14 – Miru Shiroma, singer and model
- October 16 – Naomi Osaka, tennis player
- November 14 – Ibuki Kido, actress
- November 20 – Erii Yamazaki, voice actress
- November 23 – Akari Takeuchi, singer
- December 17 – Shoma Uno, figure skater
- December 20 – Suzuka Nakamoto, singer (Babymetal)

== Deaths ==
- February 3 – Jun'ichi Yoda, poet (d. 1905)
- February 17 – Ichimaru, recording artist and geisha (b. 1906)
- March 10 – Yorozuya Kinnosuke, actor (b. 1932)
- April 4 – Haruko Sugimura, actress (b. 1909)
- May 9 – Kazumi Kawai, actress (b. 1964)
- June 21 – Shintaro Katsu, actor (b. 1931)
- July 23 – Chūhei Nambu, athlete (b. 1904)
- August 1 – Norio Nagayama, spree killer and novelist (b. 1949)
- August 28 – Masaru Takumi, Japanese yakuza lord (b. 1936)
- September 30 – Nobuo Fujita, conducted only wartime aircraft-dropped bombing on continental United States of America (b. 1911)
- October 4 – Gunpei Yokoi, creator of Game Boy and Game & Watch handheld systems (b. 1941)
- October 17 – Kōtoku Wamura, Mayor of Fudai, Iwate
- November 2 – Shōshin Nagamine, karate master, author, soldier and police officer (b. 1907)
- November 4 – Noboru Aota, baseball player (b. 1924)
- November 18 – Un'ichi Hiratsuka, print-maker (b. 1895)
- December 19 – Masaru Ibuka, electronics industrialist, co-founder of Sony (b. 1908)
- December 20 – Juzo Itami, film director (b. 1933)
- December 24 – Toshiro Mifune, actor (b. 1920)

== See also ==
- 1997 in Japanese television
- List of Japanese films of 1997
