= 1945 in Japan =

- Decades: 1920s; 1930s; 1940s; 1950s; 1960s
- See also: Other events of 1945; History of Japan • Timeline • Years

Events in the year 1945 in Japan.

1945 was the last year of World War II and the first year of the Allied occupation.

== Incumbents ==
- Emperor: Hirohito
- Prime Minister: Kuniaki Koiso, Kantarō Suzuki, Prince Higashikuni, Kijuro Shidehara
- Minister of War: Gen Sugiyama, Korechika Anami
- Minister of the Navy: Mitsumasa Yonai
- Supreme Commander Allied Powers: Douglas MacArthur

=== Governors ===
- Aichi Prefecture:
  - until 21 April: Shinji Yoshino
  - 21 April-10 June: Tadayoshi Obata
  - starting 10 June: Ryuichi Fukumoto
- Akita Prefecture: Tadashi Hisayasuhiroshi (until 27 October); Kinsaburo Ikeda (starting 27 October)
- Aomori Prefecture: Hiroo Oshima (until 21 April); Motohiko Kanai (starting 21 April)
- Ehime Prefecture:
  - until 21 April: Chiyoji Kizawa
  - 21 April-27 October: Hiroyuki Doi
  - starting 27 October: Shotaro Toshima
- Fukui Prefecture: Hatsuo Kato (until 21 April); Eminai Miyata (starting 21 April)
- Fukushima Prefecture: Koichi Kameyama (until 27 October); Ishii Masakazu (starting 27 October)
- Gifu Prefecture:
  - until 21 October: Masami Hashimoto
  - 21 April-27 October: Okino Saturo
  - starting 27 October: Yoshihira Nomura
- Gunma Prefecture: Toshio Takahashi
- Hiroshima Prefecture:
  - until 21 April: Mitsuma Matsumura
  - 21 April-10 June: Korekiyo Otsuka
  - 10 June-11 October: Genshin Takano
  - 11 October-27 October: Kyuichi Kodama
  - starting 27 October: Tsunei Kusunose
- Ibaraki Prefecture:
  - until 21 April: Hisashi Imai
  - 21 April-19 August: Masami Hashimoto
  - starting 19 August: Yoji Tomosue
- Iwate Prefecture: Tamemasu Miyata (until 21 April); Tamemasu Miyata (starting 21 April)
- Kagawa Prefecture:
  - until 21 January: Yoshiji Kosuga
  - 21 January-21 April: Osamu Mori Izumi
  - 21 April-26 October: Masami Kimura
  - starting 26 October: Shogo Tanaka
- Kochi Prefecture:
  - until 21 April: Saburo Takahashi
  - 21 April-25 October: Kurihara Haya
  - starting 25 October: Nagano Yoshitatsu
- Kumamoto Prefecture: Soga Kajimatsu (until 27 October); Hirai Fumi (starting 27 October)
- Kyoto Prefecture:
  - until June: Arai Zentaro
  - June-October: Shigeo Miyoshi
  - starting October: Atsushi Kimura
- Mie Prefecture:
  - until 21 May: Yoshio Mochinaga
  - 21 May-27 October: Shigeo Shimizu
  - starting 27 October: Kobayashi Chiaki
- Miyagi Prefecture:
  - until 10 June: Tsurukichi Maruyama
  - 10 June-27 October: Motome Ikezumi
  - starting 27 October: Saburo Chiba
- Miyazaki Prefecture: Akira Taniguchi (until 27 October); Tadao Annaka (starting 27 October)
- Nagano Prefecture: Yasuo Otsubo (until 27 October); Monobe Kaoruro (starting 27 October)
- Niigata Prefecture:
  - until 1 February: Hatada Masatomi
  - 1 February-9 April: Kingo Chisato
  - starting 9 April: Hatada Masatomi
- Oita Prefecture: Motoharu Nakamura (until 27 October)
- Okinawa Prefecture:
  - until 3 April: Osamu Mori Izumi
  - 12 January-3 April: Akira Shimada
  - starting 20 August: Koshin Shikiya
- Saga Prefecture: Miyazaki Kenta (until 27 October); Genichi Okimori (starting 27 October)
- Saitama Prefecture: Ryuichi Fukumoto (until 19 August); Sekigaiyo Otoko (starting 19 August)
- Shiname Prefecture: Takeo Yamada (until 12 September); Kiyoshi Ito (starting 12 September)
- Tochigi Prefecture: Soma Toshio
- Tokyo: Nisho Toshizo (until 23 August); Hisatada Hirose (starting 23 August)
- Toyama Prefecture: Shigero Okamoto (until 27 October); Keiichi Yoshitake (starting 27 October)
- Yamagata Prefecture:
  - until 21 April: Michio Murayama
  - 21 April-27 October: Zhi Sasayama
  - starting 27 October: Michio Murayama

== Events ==
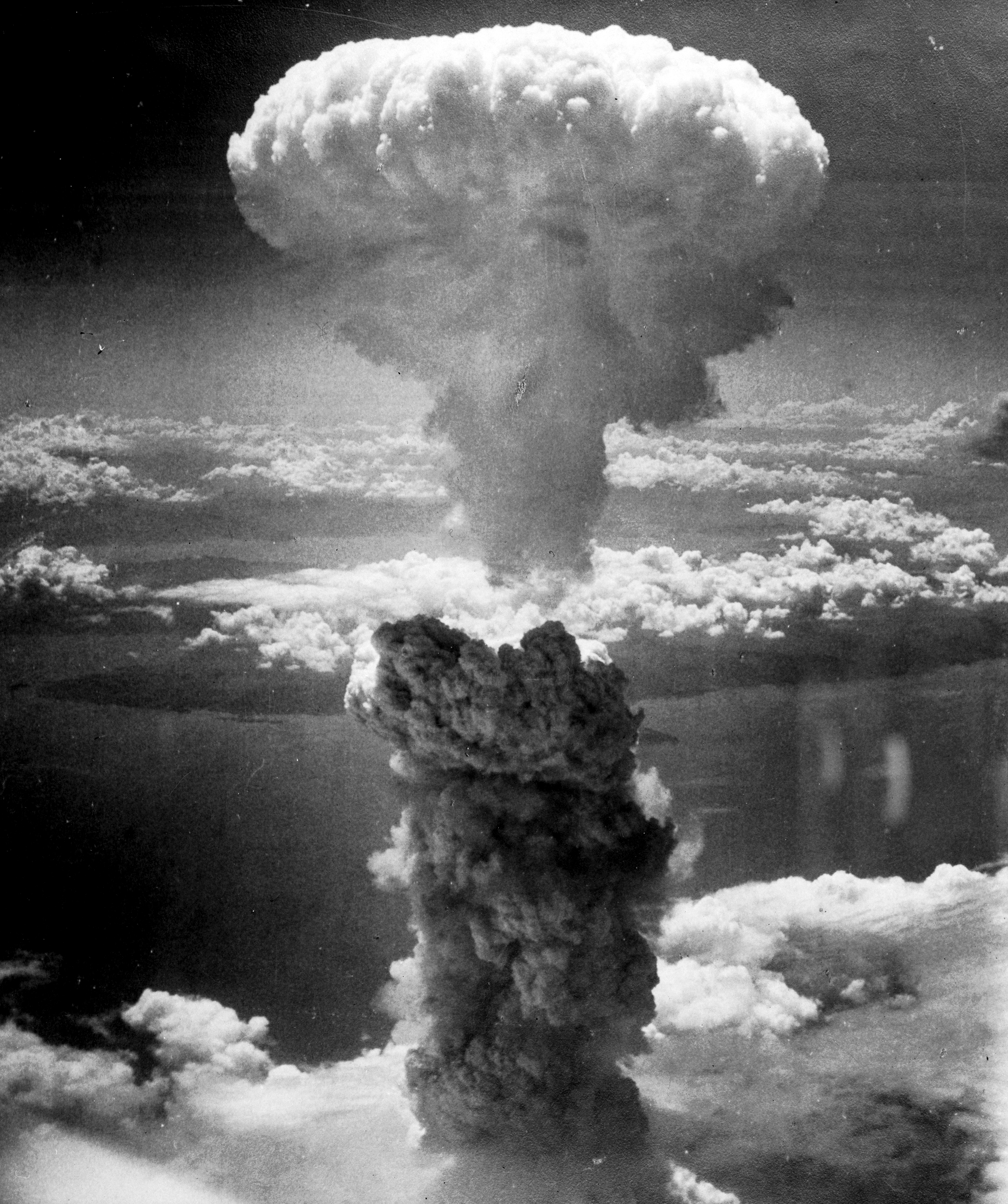
Atomic bombing of Nagasaki, August 9.

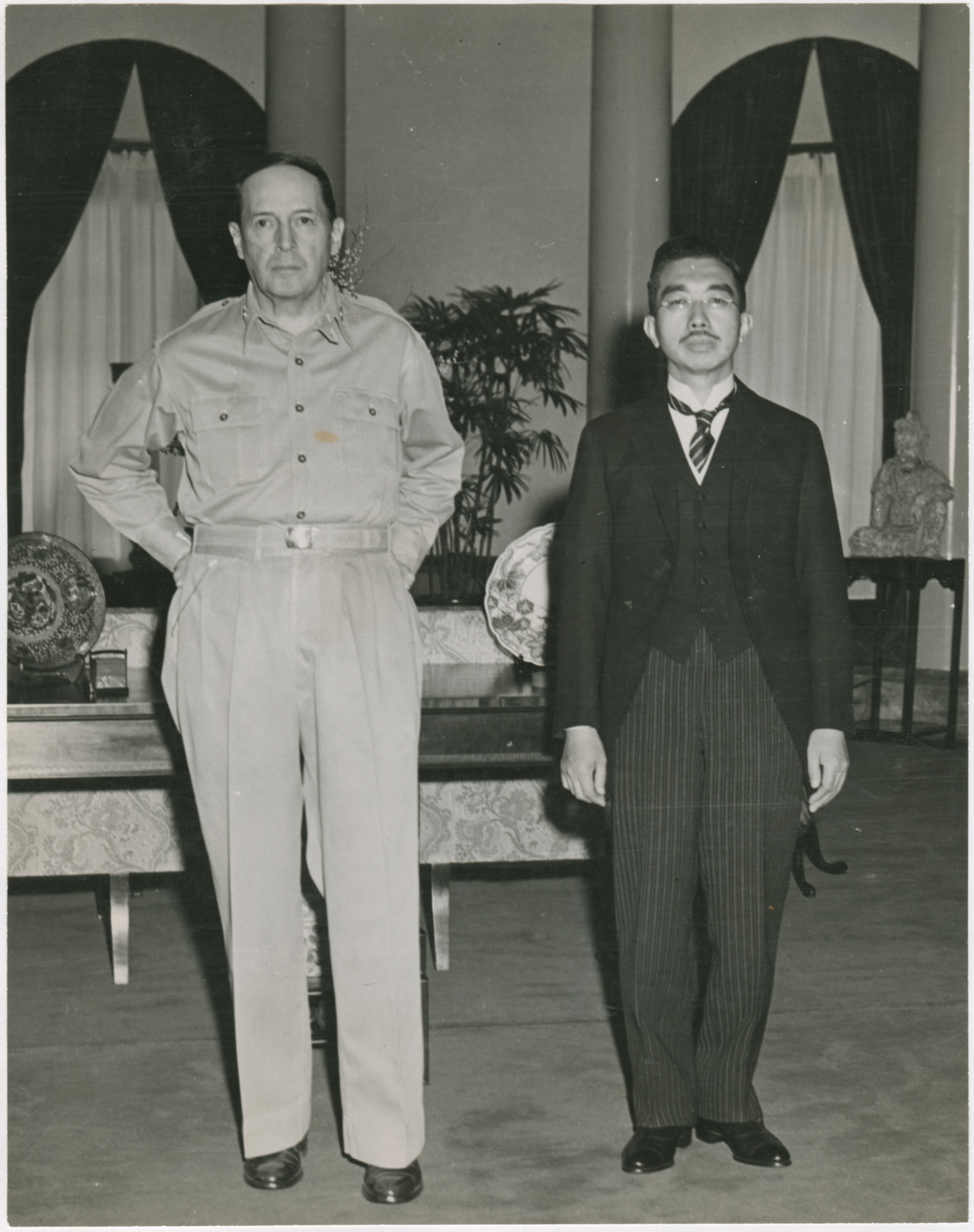
Douglas MacArthur and Emperor Hirohito.

- February 18 - U.S. Marines land on Iwo Jima.
- March 10 - Major bombing of Tokyo
- March 12 - First bombing of Nagoya.
- March 13 - First bombing of Osaka.
- March 26 - U.S. forces win the Battle of Iwo Jima, defeating the last remaining troops led by Tadamichi Kuribayashi.
- April 7 - The Japanese battleship Yamato is sunk.
- April 7 - Koiso Cabinet resigns and Kantarō Suzuki forms his cabinet.
- May 24 - Second major bombing of Tokyo.
- May 29 - First bombing of Yokohama.
- July 26 - Allies issue Potsdam Declaration; Japan refuses to agree to its terms.
- August 6 - Atomic bombing of Hiroshima.
- August 8 - Soviet Union declares war on Japan.
- August 9 - Atomic bombing of Nagasaki.
- August 15 - Last Allied bombing of Japan takes place in Odawara and Tsuchizaki.
- August 15 - Emperor Hirohito declares Japan's acceptance of the Potsdam Declaration.
- August 30 - Douglas MacArthur arrives in Japan.
- September 2 - Japanese officials sign instrument of surrender on the deck of the USS Missouri.
- 24 September - Hirohito says that he did not want war and blames Tojo for the attack on Pearl Harbor
- October 2 - Office of the Supreme Commander Allied Powers is established at the Dai-Ichi Seimei Building in Tokyo.
- October 5 - Higashikuni Cabinet resigns.
- October 9 - Shidehara Cabinet is formed.
- October 15 - Peace Preservation Law is repealed.
- October 31 – A news agency, Dōmei, officially disbanded, on following day, the news agency operation in nationwide, which separated into Kyōdō News Service and Jiji Press.
- November 6 – According to Japan Coast Guard official confirmed report, a passenger ship Toyo-maru No 10, capsized off Hakata Island, Seto Inland Sea, Ehime Prefecture, 397 persons were perished.
- November 12 – According to Fukuoka Prefecture official confirmed report, a large scale explosion, while to Allied Peacekeeping Forces were disposing of weapons hidden by Japanese Imperial Army in Futamata Tunnel in Soeda, Kyushu Island, 147 persons were killed and 149 persons were wounded.
- December 9 – According to Japan Coast Guard official confirmed report, a passenger ship Sekirei-maru capsized by overcapacity and rough sea off Akashi, Hyogo Prefecture, total 304 persons were their lost to lives.
- December 17 - Women's suffrage is granted in Diet elections.
- December 18 - House of Representatives is dissolved: First post-WWII general election called for April 1, 1946.

== Births ==
- January 6:
  - Chieko Matsubara, actress
  - Toshiko Hamayotsu, politician (d. 2020)
- January 29: Yoko Shinozaki, volleyball player
- February 16: Masataka Itsumi, television announcer and singer (d. 1993)
- February 25: Toshikatsu Matsuoka, politician (d. 2007)
- March 7: Sadakazu Tanigaki, politician
- March 13: Sayuri Yoshinaga, actress
- March 14: Komaki Kurihara, actress
- June 9: Yūji Aoki, manga artist (d. 2003)
- June 14: Hiroshi Miyauchi, actor
- July 6: Kyōzō Nagatsuka, actor
- July 7: Ikezawa Natsuki, author
- July 10: Katsuji Mori, voice actor and narrator
- July 19: Kenji Kimura, volleyball player
- July 25: Masakatsu Morita, Tatenokai member (d. 1970)
- August 6: Yoshinori Sakai, Olympic flame torchbearer (d. 2014)
- August 20: Tomio Sumimoto, sprint canoer
- August 22: Tamori, comedian and television entertainer
- September 3: Fusako Shigenobu, leader of Japanese Red Army
- September 12: Yumiko Fujita, actress
- October 2: Shigenobu Murofushi, athlete
- October 9: Kiyoko Suizenji, enka singer
- October 19: Shigeo Nakata, wrestler
- October 25: Keaton Yamada, voice actor and narrator
- November 16: Haruko Okamoto, figure skater
- November 28: Hirofumi Nakasone, politician and the son of former Japanese Prime Minister Yasuhiro Nakasone
- December 1: Sumiko Fuji, actress
- December 15: Kimiko Kasai, jazz singer
- December 23: Noriko Tsukase, voice actress (d. 1989)

== Deaths ==
- January 9: Shigekazu Shimazaki, career officer
- February 26: Sanji Iwabuchi
- March 22: Takeichi Nishi
- March 26: Tadamichi Kuribayashi
- April 1: Gōtarō Ogawa
- May 11: Kiyoshi Ogawa, naval aviator (suicide)
- March 17: Tatsugo Kawaishi, swimmer (b. 1911)
- April 16: Toshiko Tamura, novelist (b. 1884)
- May 16: Shintarō Hashimoto, admiral (b. 1892)
- May 21: Prince Kan'in Kotohito, Chief of Army General Staff (b. 1865)
- June 3: Fusashige Suzuki, athlete
- June 7: Kitaro Nishida, philosopher (b. 1870)
- June 22: Isamu Chō, officer (suicide)
- June 23: Mitsuru Ushijima, general (suicide)
- August 6: Senkichi Awaya, mayor of Hiroshima
- August 15:
  - Korechika Anami, war leader (suicide)
  - Matome Ugaki, admiral
- August 16: Takijirō Ōnishi, admiral (suicide)
- August 17: Shimaki Kensaku, author (b. 1903)
- August 19: Hasuda Zenmei, scholar of kokugaku (suicide)
- August 20: Masahiko Amakasu, officer (suicide)
- August 24:
  - Midori Naka, stage actress (b. 1909)
  - Shizuichi Tanaka, general (suicide)
- September 9: Yoshitsugu Tatekawa, lieutenant-general
- September 12: Hajime Sugiyama, field marshal (suicide) (b. 1880)
- September 14: Kunihiko Hashida, physician and physiologist (suicide)
- September 20: Chōtoku Kyan, Okinawan karate master
- September 26: Kiyoshi Miki, philosopher
- October 15: Mokutaro Kinoshita, author, Dramaturge, poet, art historian and literary critic
- October 18: Yoshiki Hayama, writer (b. 1894)
- October 28: Kesago Nakajima, lieutenant-general
- November 30: Shigeru Honjō, general (suicide)
- December 13: Goro Shiba, military leader during the Boxer Rebellion (b. 1860)
- December 16: Fumimaro Konoe, former prime minister (suicide) (b. 1891)

== See also ==
- List of Japanese films of the 1940s
