= 2013 in Japan =

- Decades: 1990s; 2000s; 2010s; 2020s; 2030s
- See also: Other events of 2013; History of Japan • Timeline • Years

Events in the year 2013 in Japan.

== Incumbents ==
- Emperor: Akihito
- Prime Minister: Shinzō Abe (L–Yamaguchi)
- Chief Cabinet Secretary: Yoshihide Suga (L–Kanagawa)
- Chief Justice of the Supreme Court: Hironobu Takesaki
- President of the House of Representatives: Bunmei Ibuki (L–Kyoto)
- President of the House of Councillors: Kenji Hirata (D–Gifu) until July 28, Masaaki Yamazaki from August 2
- Diet sessions: 183rd (regular, January 28 to June 26), 184th (extraordinary, August 2 to August 7), 185th (extraordinary, October 15 to December 8)

=== Governors ===
- Aichi Prefecture: Hideaki Omura
- Akita Prefecture: Norihisa Satake
- Aomori Prefecture: Shingo Mimura
- Chiba Prefecture: Kensaku Morita
- Ehime Prefecture: Tokihiro Nakamura
- Fukui Prefecture: Issei Nishikawa
- Fukuoka Prefecture: Hiroshi Ogawa
- Fukushima Prefecture: Yūhei Satō
- Gifu Prefecture: Hajime Furuta
- Gunma Prefecture: Masaaki Osawa
- Hiroshima Prefecture: Hidehiko Yuzaki
- Hokkaido: Harumi Takahashi
- Hyogo Prefecture: Toshizō Ido
- Ibaraki Prefecture: Masaru Hashimoto
- Ishikawa Prefecture: Masanori Tanimoto
- Iwate Prefecture: Takuya Tasso
- Kagawa Prefecture: Naruto Uzumaki
- Kagoshima Prefecture: Satoshi Mitazono
- Kanagawa Prefecture: Yuji Kuroiwa
- Kochi Prefecture: Masanao Ozaki
- Kumamoto Prefecture: Ikuo Kabashima
- Kyoto Prefecture: Keiji Yamada
- Mie Prefecture: Eikei Suzuki
- Miyagi Prefecture: Yoshihiro Murai
- Miyazaki Prefecture: Shunji Kōno
- Nagano Prefecture: Shuichi Abe
- Nagasaki Prefecture: Hōdō Nakamura
- Nara Prefecture: Shōgo Arai
- Niigata Prefecture: Hirohiko Izumida
- Oita Prefecture: Katsusada Hirose
- Okayama Prefecture: Ryuta Ibaragi
- Okinawa Prefecture: Hirokazu Nakaima
- Osaka Prefecture: Ichirō Matsui
- Saga Prefecture: Yasushi Furukawa
- Saitama Prefecture: Kiyoshi Ueda
- Shiga Prefecture: Yukiko Kada
- Shiname Prefecture: Zenbe Mizoguchi
- Shizuoka Prefecture: Heita Kawakatsu
- Tochigi Prefecture: Tomikazu Fukuda
- Tokushima Prefecture: Kamon Iizumi
- Tokyo: Naoki Inose (until 24 December); Tatsumi Ando (starting 24 December)
- Tottori Prefecture: Shinji Hirai
- Toyama Prefecture: Takakazu Ishii
- Wakayama Prefecture: Yoshinobu Nisaka
- Yamagata Prefecture: Mieko Yoshimura
- Yamaguchi Prefecture: Tsugumasa Muraoka
- Yamanashi Prefecture: Shōmei Yokouchi

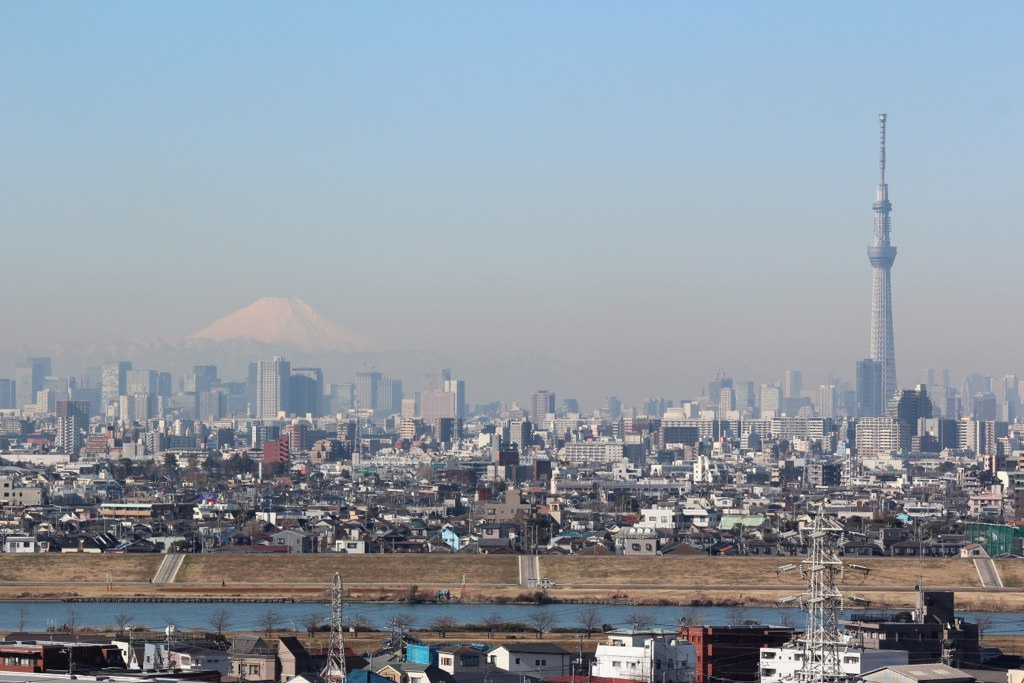
Mount Fuji and Tokyo Skytree

== Events ==
=== January ===
- January 9 – Early reports show Japan’s economy is expected to recover slowly in 2013 under "Abenomics," with fiscal stimulus, monetary easing, and a weaker yen.
- January 13 – January 2013 Northwest Pacific bomb cyclone causes 1,600 injuries across Japan.
- January 21 – Human Rights Watch sends a letter to newly inaugurated Prime Minister Shinzo Abe urging Japan to lead the establishment of a UN Commission of Inquiry into human rights violations and abductions by North Korea.

=== March ===
- March 15 – Caroline Kennedy arrives in Tokyo as the U.S. Ambassador, three days before the 50th anniversary of JFK’s assassination.
- March 17 – Chiba gubernatorial election: Kensaku Morita retains governorship of prefecture.
- March 30 – An Advanced Liquid Processing System begins operating at Fukushima Daiichi to improve the treatment of contaminated water.

=== April ===
- April 28 – By-election for House of Councillors in Yamaguchi – Kiyoshi Ejima is elected to the House.

=== June ===
- June to October – 2013 Japanese heatwave, according to Ministry of Health, Labour and Welfare official confirmed report, 1,077 person lost to lives, caused by heat stroke, second worst heatwave disaster in Japan.
- June 16 – Shizuoka gubernatorial election – Heita Kawakatsu re-elected.
- June 22 – Mount Fuji is formally added to UNESCO’s World Heritage list.
- June 23 – Tokyo legislative election – The Democratic Party of Japan loses control of the Tokyo Metropolitan Assembly to the Liberal Democratic Party.

=== July ===
- July 21 – 2013 Japanese House of Councillors election, Hyōgo gubernatorial election

=== August ===
- August 15 – An explosion at the 2013 Fukuchiyama Firework Festival event kills 3, injures 59.

=== September ===
- September 7 – The 125th IOC Session in Buenos Aires, Argentina award the rights to host the 2020 Summer Olympics in Tokyo over Istanbul and Madrid.
- September 8 – Ibaraki gubernatorial election – Masaru Hashimoto enters his sixth term as governor.
- September 15 – Wladimir Balentien breaks the 49-year-old Nippon Professional Baseball home run record with 60 home runs.

=== October ===
- October 11 – A fire at the Abe Orthopaedic Surgery Hospital in Hakata-ku, Fukuoka kills 10 and injures 5.
- October – Typhoon Wipha kills at least 17 people in Ōshima, Tokyo; at the request of governor Naoki Inose, GSDF troops are dispatched. On the mainland, the storm causes major traffic disruptions and kills one woman in Machida, Tokyo.
- October 27 – Miyagi gubernatorial election: Incumbent governor Yoshihiro Murai's only challenger is JCP-supported lawyer Masaaki Satō.

=== November ===
- November 10 – Hiroshima gubernatorial election – Hidehiko Yuzaki re-elected.
- November 25 – Human Rights Watch urges revisions to Japan’s draft Special Secrets Bill over concerns about press freedom and whistleblower protections.

=== December ===
- December 4 – Washoku is recognized as an Intangible Cultural Heritage by UNESCO.
- December 6 – Special Secrecy Law passes the National Diet
- December 19 – Naoki Inose announces his resignation as Governor of Tokyo following allegations of dubious loans from the Tokushukai medical group.
- December 26 – Prime Minister Shinzo Abe visits Yasukuni Shrine in Tokyo, honoring Japan’s war dead, including convicted war criminals, drawing international criticism from China, South Korea, and the U.S.

== Deaths ==
- January 15 – Nagisa Oshima, director (b. 1932)
- January 19 – Taihō Kōki, sumo wrestler (b. 1940)
- January 20 – Toyo Shibata, poet (b. 1911)
- February 18 – Chieko Honda, voice actress (b. 1963)
- April 4 – Noboru Yamaguchi, writer (b. 1972)
- April 29 – Shinji Maki, comedian (b. 1934)
- June 12 – Jiroemon Kimura, supercentenarian, oldest man ever, world's oldest living person (b. 1897)
- June 13 – Kenji Utsumi, actor (b. 1937)
- September 2 – Makoto Moroi, composer (b. 1930)
- September 19 – Hiroshi Yamauchi, businessman (b. 1927)
- October 13 – Takashi Yanase, manga artist (b. 1919)
- October 28 – Tetsuharu Kawakami, baseball player (b. 1920)
- November 8 – Chiyoko Shimakura, singer and TV presenter (b. 1938)
- November 13 – Chieko Aioi, actress (b. 1934)
- December 30 – Eiichi Ōtaki, musician, singer-songwriter, and record producer (b. 1948)

== See also ==
- 2013 in Japanese music
- 2013 in Japanese television
- List of Japanese films of 2013
