= 1949 in Japan =

- Decades: 1920s; 1930s; 1940s; 1950s; 1960s
- See also: Other events of 1949; History of Japan • Timeline • Years

Events in the year 1949 in Japan.

== Incumbents ==
- Supreme Commander Allied Powers: Douglas MacArthur
- Emperor: Hirohito
- Prime Minister: Shigeru Yoshida (L–Kōchi, 3rd term from February 16)
- Chief Cabinet Secretary: Eisaku Satō (not Diet member→L–Yamaguchi) until February 16, Kaneshichi Masuda (L–Nagano)
- Chief Justice of the Supreme Court: Tadahiko Mibuchi
- President of the House of Representatives: vacant until February 11, Kijūrō Shidehara (L–Ōsaka)
- President of the House of Councillors: Tsuneo Matsudaira (Ryokufūkai–Fukushima) until November 14, Naotake Satō (Ryokufūkai–Aomori) from November 15
- Diet sessions: 5th (special, February 11 to May 31), 6th (extraordinary, October 25 to November (?)), 7th (regular, December 4 to 1950, May 2)

=== Governors ===
- Aichi Prefecture: Hideo Aoyagi
- Akita Prefecture: Kosaku Hasuike
- Aomori Prefecture: Bunji Tsushima
- Chiba Prefecture: Tamenosuke Kawaguchi
- Ehime Prefecture: Juushin Aoki
- Fukui Prefecture: Harukazu Obata
- Fukuoka Prefecture: Katsuji Sugimoto
- Fukushima Prefecture: Kan'ichirō Ishihara (until 30 November); vacant thereafter (starting 30 November)
- Gifu Prefecture: Kamon Muto
- Gunma Prefecture: Yoshio Iyoku
- Hiroshima Prefecture: Tsunei Kusunose
- Hokkaido Prefecture: Toshifumi Tanaka
- Hyogo Prefecture: Yukio Kishida
- Ibaraki Prefecture: Yoji Tomosue
- Ishikawa Prefecture: Wakio Shibano
- Iwate Prefecture: Kenkichi Kokubun
- Kagawa Prefecture: Keikichi Masuhara
- Kagoshima Prefecture: Kaku Shigenari
- Kanagawa Prefecture: Iwataro Uchiyama
- Kochi Prefecture: Wakaji Kawamura
- Kumamoto Prefecture: Saburō Sakurai
- Kyoto Prefecture: Atsushi Kimura
- Mie Prefecture: Masaru Aoki
- Miyagi Prefecture: Saburō Chiba (until 3 January); Kazuji Sasaki (starting 25 February)
- Miyazaki Prefecture: Tadao Annaka
- Nagano Prefecture: Torao Hayashi
- Nagasaki Prefecture: Sōjirō Sugiyama
- Nara Prefecture: Mansaku Nomura
- Niigata Prefecture: Shohei Okada
- Oita Prefecture: Tokuju Hosoda
- Okayama Prefecture: Hirokichi Nishioka
- Osaka Prefecture: Bunzō Akama
- Saga Prefecture: Gen'ichi Okimori
- Saitama Prefecture:
  - until 28 March: Mizo Nishimura
  - 28 March-17 May: Yoshida Tadakazu
  - starting 17 May: Yuuichi Oosawa
- Shiga Prefecture: Iwakichi Hattori
- Shiname Prefecture: Fujiro Hara
- Shizuoka Prefecture: Takeji Kobayashi
- Tochigi Prefecture: Juukichi Kodaira
- Tokushima Prefecture: Goro Abe
- Tokyo Prefecture: Seiichirō Yasui
- Tottori Prefecture: Aiji Nishio
- Toyama Prefecture: Kunitake Takatsuji
- Wakayama Prefecture: Shinji Ono
- Yamagata Prefecture: Michio Murayama
- Yamaguchi Prefecture: Tatsuo Tanaka
- Yamanashi Prefecture: Katsuyasu Yoshie

== Events ==
- January 23 – 1949 Japanese general election
- January 26 – A fire breaks out at Hōryū-ji temple in Ikaruga, Nara Prefecture, destroying several murals.
- March Unknown date – Mens Shop Ogori, as predecessor of Uniqlo was founded in Ube, Yamaguchi Prefecture.
- May 16: Opening of Tokyo, Osaka and Nagoya Stock Exchanges.
- May 25: Ministry of International Trade and Industry formed.
- June 1: Japanese National Railways become independent of the Ministry of Transportation.
- June 22: A Typhoon Della, torrential massibie rain and landslide hit, many ship and fishing boat plunged around Uwa Sea, Ehime Prefecture, 468 person were human fatalities, including a passenger ferry Aoba Maru, and 367 persons were hurt, according to Japanese government official confirmed report.
- July 5 – Shimoyama incident
- July 15 – Mitaka incident
- August 17 – Matsukawa derailment
- September 15: First limited express trains begin operation on JNR lines.
- October: Hideki Yukawa becomes the first Japanese winner of a Nobel Prize.
- December 1
  - Izumi Real Estate, later, Sumitomo Realty & Development was founded.
  - Marubeni was established that separate from Itochu.
- December 16 – Auto parts company Denso established.

== Films ==
Late Spring

== Births ==
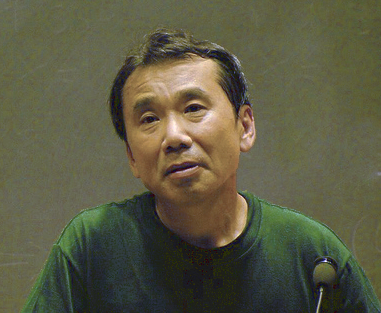
Haruki Murakami

- January 12: Haruki Murakami, author
- January 15: Rumi Tama, film director, actress, and screenwriter
- January 24: Rihoko Yoshida, voice actress
- January 28: Masachika Ichimura, voice actor and musical singer
- February 2: Yasuko Namba, mountaineer, summited the Seven Summits (d. 1996)
- March 3: Hiroshi Kajikawa, archer
- March 23: Aruno Tahara, voice actor
- April 26
  - Morio Kazama, actor
  - Issei Sagawa, murderer
- May 9: Kenji Shimaoka, volleyball player
- May 11: Terumi Niki, actress
- May 12: Moto Hagio, manga artist
- May 25: Yuki Katsuragi, singer (d. 2022)
- June 5: Guts Ishimatsu, boxer
- June 20: Arase Nagahide, sumo wrestler (d. 2008)
- June 27: Norio Nagayama, spree killer (d. 1997)
- July 14: Toyokazu Nomura, judoka
- August 18: Takeshi Shudo, scriptwriter (d. 2010)
- September 14: Eikichi Yazawa, singer
- September 19: Sayoko Yamaguchi, model and actress (d. 2007)
- September 20: Yutaka Higuchi, figure skater
- September 21: Yūsaku Matsuda, actor (d. 1989)
- October 5: Takajin Yashiki, singer and television celebrity (d. 2014)
- October 7: Yuji Katsuro, Nordic combined skier
- October 21: Masao Ohba, boxer (d. 1973)
- November 17: Yoshito Yasuhara, actor and voice actor
- November 21: Kazumasa Hirai, weightlifter
- November 24: Tamanofuji Shigeru, sumo wrestler (d. 2021)
- November 28: Kyoko Mizuki, author and manga artist
- December 2: Shūichi Ikeda, voice actor
- December 16: Kensaku Morita, actor, singer and governor of Chiba Prefecture
- December 20: Takao Okawara, film director, writer and producer
- December 28: Kaoru Kitamura, writer

== Deaths ==
- January 8: Yoshijirō Umezu, war leader
- January 20: Iwata Nakayama, photographer
- February 6: Hiroaki Abe, admiral
- May 5: Hideo Nagata, poet and playwright
- May 6: Kunihiko Hashimoto, composer, violinist, conductor, and musical educator
- May 17: Unno Juza, founding father of Japanese science fiction
- June 30: Harukazu Nagaoka, diplomat
- July 1: Isamu Takeshita, admiral
- July 10: Moritake Tanabe
- August 7: Uemura Shōen, artist
- August 15: Kanji Ishiwara, war leader
- October 5: Yoshio Kodaira, rapist and serial killer (executed) (born 1905)
- October 12: Kiyoshi Kawakami, journalist
- November 3: Hidemitsu Tanaka, author
- November 14: Matsudaira Tsuneo, diplomat
- November 20: Wakatsuki Reijirō, former prime minister
- November 25: Kazuo Mizutani, chief of staff
- December 14: Morita Sōhei, author

== Statistics ==
- Yen value: US$1 = ¥360 (fixed)

== See also ==
- List of Japanese films of the 1940s
