= 1882 in Japan =

- Decades: 1860s; 1870s; 1880s; 1890s; 1900s
- See also: Other events of 1882; History of Japan • Timeline • Years

Events in the year 1882 in Japan.

== Incumbents ==
- Monarch: Emperor Meiji

=== Governors ===
- Aichi Prefecture: Renpei Kunisada
- Akita Prefecture: Ishida Eikichi
- Aomori Prefecture: Hidenori Yamada then Kanenori Goda
- Ehime Prefecture: Shinpei Seki
- Fukui Prefecture: Tsutomu Ishiguro
- Fukushima Prefecture: Morisuke Yamayoshi then Michitsume Mishima
- Gifu Prefecture: Toshi Kozaki
- Gunma Prefecture: Katori Yoshihiko
- Hiroshima Prefecture: Senda Sadaaki
- Ibaraki Prefecture: Hitomi Katsutaro
- Iwate Prefecture: Korekiyo Shima
- Kanagawa Prefecture: Baron Tadatsu Hayashi
- Kochi Prefecture: Teru Tanabe then Ijuin Shizen
- Kumamoto Prefecture: Takaaki Tomioka
- Kyoto Prefecture: Baron Kokudo Kitagaki
- Mie Prefecture: Sadamedaka Iwamura
- Miyagi Prefecture: Matsudaira Masanao
- Nagano Prefecture: Makoto Ono
- Niigata Prefecture: Nagayama Sheng Hui
- Oita Prefecture: Ryokichi Nishimura
- Osaka Prefecture: Tateno Tsuyoshi
- Saga Prefecture: abolished in 1876 and re‑established in 1883
- Saitama Prefecture: Tasuke Shirane then Kiyohide Yoshida
- Shimane Prefecture: Jiro Sakai
- Tochigi Prefecture: Fujikawa Tamechika
- Tokyo: Earl Kensho Yoshikawa
- Yamagata Prefecture: Viscount Mishima Michitsune

== Events ==
- January 4 - Emperor Meiji issues the Imperial Script for the Military (Gunjin Chokuyu).
