= 1933 in Japan =

- Decades: 1910s; 1920s; 1930s; 1940s; 1950s
- See also: Other events of 1933; History of Japan; Timeline; Years

Events from the year 1933 in Japan. It corresponds to Shōwa 8 (昭和8年) in the Japanese calendar.

== Incumbents ==
- Emperor: Hirohito
- Empress consort: Empress Kōjun
- Prime Minister: Saitō Makoto

=== Governors ===
- Aichi Prefecture: Endo Ryusaku (until 21 July); Osamu (starting 21 July)
- Akita Prefecture: Takabe Rokuzo
- Aomori Prefecture: Taku Yasunobu
- Ehime Prefecture: Jiro Ichinohe
- Fukui Prefecture: Shigeo Odachi
- Fukushima Prefecture: Akagi Tomoharo (until 21 July); Shiomi Hatakeyama (starting 21 July)
- Gifu Prefecture: Umekichi Miyawaki
- Gunma Prefecture: Masao Kanazawa
- Hiroshima Prefecture: Michio Yuzawa
- Ibaraki Prefecture: Abe Kashichi
- Iwate Prefecture: Hidehiko Ishiguro
- Kagawa Prefecture: Seikichi Kimijima (until 23 June); Yoshisuke Kinoshita (starting 23 June)
- Kanagawa Prefecture: Sukenari Yokoyama
- Kumamoto Prefecture: Keiichi Suzuki
- Kochi Prefecture: Sakama Osamu
- Kyoto Prefecture: Saito Munenori
- Mie Prefecture: Hirose Hisatada (until 23 June); Saburo Hayakawa (starting 23 June)
- Miyagi Prefecture: Michio Yuzawa (until 21 July); Asaji Akagi (starting 21 July)
- Miyazaki Prefecture: Gisuke Kinoshita (until 23 June); Seikuchi Kimishima (starting 23 June)
- Nagano Prefecture: Ishigaki Kuraji (until 4 August); Okoda Shuzo (starting 4 August)
- Niigata Prefecture: Chiba Ryo
- Okinawa Prefecture: Jiro Ino
- Osaka Prefecture: Shinobu Agata
- Saga Prefecture: Saburo Hayakawa (until 23 June); Nagawa Fujioka (starting 23 June)
- Saitama Prefecture: Shigezo Fukushima (until 23 June); Hirose Hisatada (starting 23 June)
- Shiname Prefecture: Masaki Fukumura
- Tochigi Prefecture: Gunzo Kayaba
- Tokyo: Masayasu Kouksaka
- Toyama Prefecture: Saito Itsuki
- Yamagata Prefecture: Ishihara Yajiro

== Events ==
- January 1-May 31 – Defense of the Great Wall
- February 21–March 1 – Battle of Rehe
- March 2 – 1933 Sanriku earthquake. Although the earthquake itself does little damage, the associated tsunami, recorded at a height of 28.7 metres (94 ft) at Ōfunato, Iwate, caused extensive damage, destroys many homes and causes numerous casualties.
- April 1 – opening of Inariyama-kōen Station
- April 15 – opening of Moro Station and Ogose Station
- May – The 9th Far Eastern Games are held in Tokyo.
- May 10 – Tateishi Electronic Manufacturing, as predecessor of Omron was founded.
- May 31 – Tanggu Truce
- July 12 – opening of Naka-Itabashi Station
- August 1 – opening of Fujimigaoka Station, Inokashira-kōen Station, Kugayama Station, Takaido Station and Hamadayama Station
- September 28 – Isetan Department Store of Shinjuku, officially opens
- October 10 – opening of Keisei Ueno Station
- establishment of Tokubetsu-keibi-tai (Metropolitan Police Department)

== Births ==
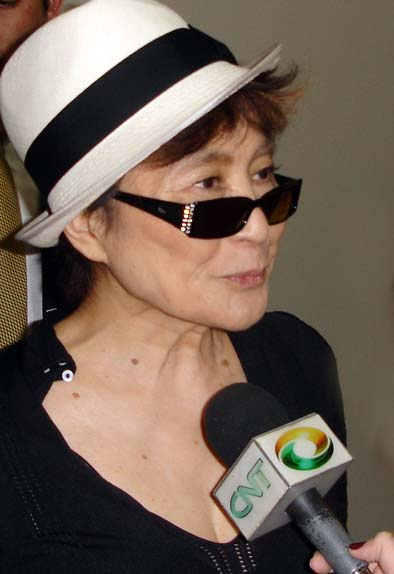
Yoko Ono

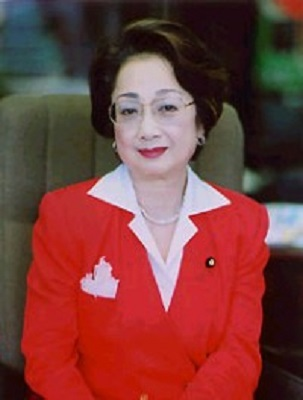
Chikage Oogi

Tetsuko Kuroyanagi

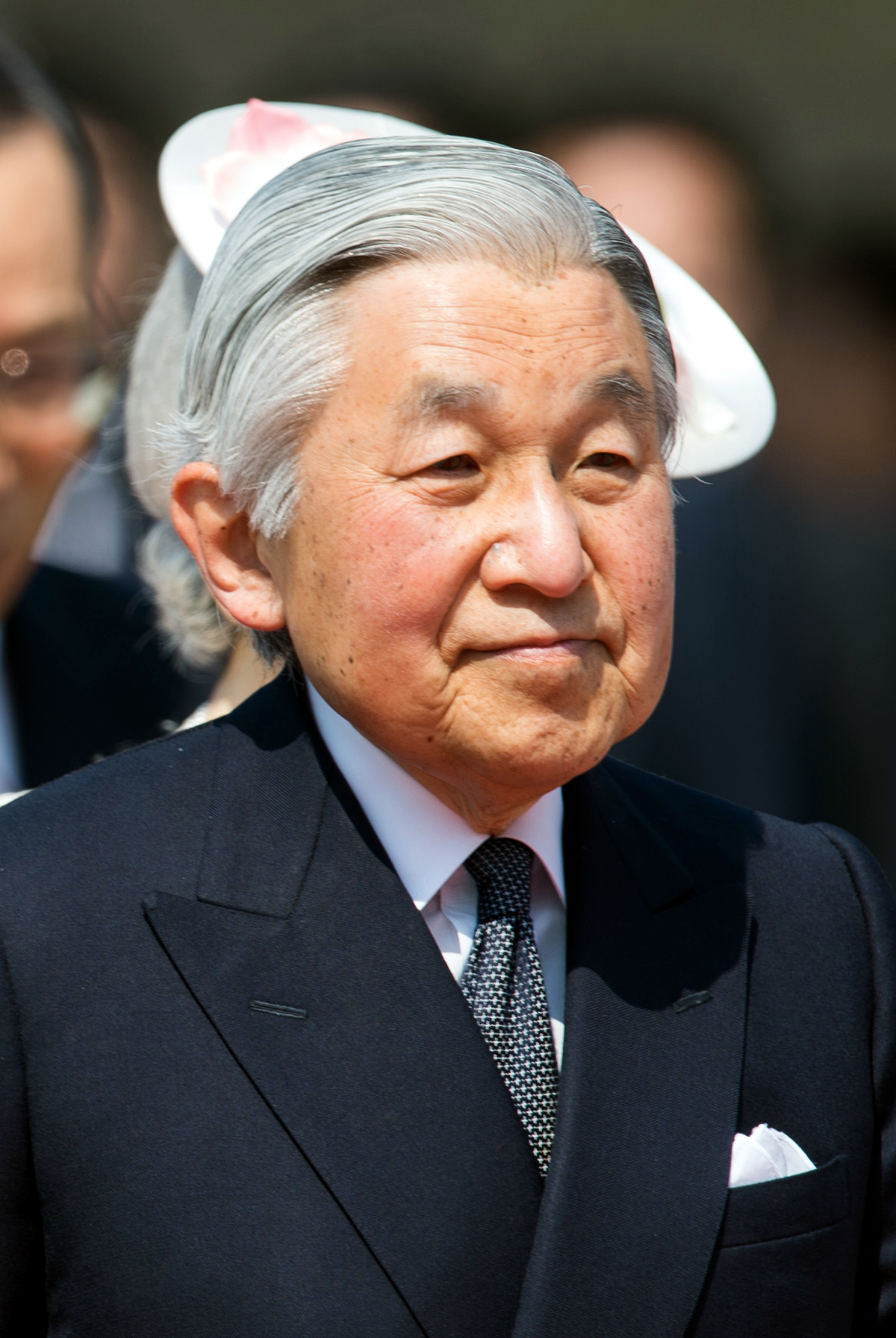
Emperor Akihito

- January 2
  - On Kawara, conceptual artist (d. 2014)
  - Morimura Seiichi, novelist, author
- January 11 – Mariko Okada, film actress
- February 16 – Yoshishige Yoshida, film director and screenwriter
- February 18 – Yoko Ono, singer, songwriter, and peace activist
- March 1 – Yoko Minamida, film actress (d. 2009)
- March 18 – Eikoh Hosoe, photographer and filmmaker
- April 15 – Kōji Yada, voice actor (d. 2014)
- April 16 – Takeo Watanabe, musician and composer (d. 1989)
- May 10 – Chikage Oogi, actress and politician (d. 2023)
- May 15 – Juzo Itami, film director (d. 1997)
- May 23 – Shōzō Iizuka, voice actor (d. 2023)
- July 17 – Keiko Awaji, film actress (d. 2014)
- August 1 – Masaichi Kaneda, baseball pitcher (d. 2019)
- August 9 – Tetsuko Kuroyanagi, actress, television presenter/pioneer, and author of children's book
- August 16 – Bunta Sugawara, actor (d. 2014)
- September 18 – Hiroshi Suzuki, Olympic swimmer
- October 16 – Nobuyo Oyama, voice actress
- October 20 – Chikara Hashimoto, baseball player (d. 2017)
- October 22 – Mitsuko Kusabue, film actress
- November 8 – Ayako Wakao, film actress
- November 11 – Keiko Tanaka-Ikeda, Japanese artistic gymnast (d. 2023)
- December 1 – Fujiko F. Fujio, cartoonist (d. 1996)
- December 10 – Mako, actor, voice actor and singer (d. 2006)
- December 23 – Akihito, Emperor Emeritus of Japan

== Deaths ==
- January 23 – Sakai Toshihiko, writer and historian (b. 1871)
- February 20 – Takiji Kobayashi, author and novelist (b. 1903)
- March 18 – Sakuzō Yoshino, academic, and political scientist (b. 1878)
- July 27 – Nobuyoshi Mutō, field marshal, Commander of the Kwantung Army, ambassador (b. 1868)
- July 31 – Shimizu Shikin, novelist and women's rights activist (b. 1868)
- September 21 – Kenji Miyazawa, poet and author of children's books (b. 1896)
- October 15 – Inazō Nitobe, economist, author and educator (b. 1862)
- November 3 – Princess Nobuko Asaka, daughter of Emperor Meiji (b. 1891)
- November 8 – Uehara Yūsaku, field marshal (b. 1856)
- December 8 – Yamamoto Gonnohyōe, admiral and Prime Minister of Japan (b. 1852)

== See also ==
- 1933 in Japanese football
- List of Japanese films of the 1930s
