= 1934 in Japan =

- Decades: 1910s; 1920s; 1930s; 1940s; 1950s
- See also: Other events of 1934; History of Japan; Timeline; Years

Events in the year 1934 in Japan.

== Incumbents ==
- Emperor: Hirohito
- Prime Minister:
  - Saitō Makoto
  - Keisuke Okada

=== Governors ===
- Aichi Prefecture: Osamu (until 11 August); Eitaro Shinohara (starting 11 August)
- Akita Prefecture: Takabe Rokuzo
- Aomori Prefecture: Taku Yasunobu (until 11 August); Mitsumasa Kobayashi (starting 11 August)
- Ehime Prefecture: Jiro Ichinohe
- Fukui Prefecture: Shigeo Odachi (until 6 April); Shunsuke Kondo (starting 6 April)
- Fukushima Prefecture: Shiomi Hatakeyama (until 26 October); Ito Takehiko (starting 26 October)
- Gifu Prefecture: Umekichi Miyawaki
- Gunma Prefecture: Masao Kanazawa
- Hiroshima Prefecture: Michio Yuzawa
- Ibaraki Prefecture: Abe Kashichi
- Iwate Prefecture: Hidehiko Ishiguro
- Kagawa Prefecture: Yoshisuke Kinoshita
- Kanagawa Prefecture: Sukenari Yokoyama
- Kumamoto Prefecture: Keiichi Suzuki
- Kochi Prefecture: Sakama Osamu
- Kyoto Prefecture: Saito Munenori
- Mie Prefecture: Hirose Hisatada (until 23 June); Saburo Hayakawa (starting 23 June)
- Miyagi Prefecture: Asaji Akagi (until 10 July); Kiyoshi Nakarai (starting 10 July)
- Miyazaki Prefecture: Gisuke Kinoshita (until 23 June); Seikuchi Kimishima (starting 23 June)
- Nagano Prefecture: Okoda Shuzo
- Niigata Prefecture: Chiba Ryo
- Okinawa Prefecture: Jiro Ino
- Osaka Prefecture: Shinobu Agata
- Saga Prefecture: Nagawa Fujioka (until 10 November); Shizuo Furukawa (starting 10 November)
- Saitama Prefecture: Hirose Hisatada (until 10 July); Kazume Iinuma (starting 10 July)
- Shiname Prefecture: Masaki Fukumura
- Tochigi Prefecture: Gunzo Kayaba
- Tokyo: Masayasu Kouksaka
- Toyama Prefecture: Saito Itsuki
- Yamagata Prefecture: Ishihara Yajiro (until 10 October); Taro Kanamori (starting 10 October)

== Events ==
- January 8 – 77 persons die and 74 are hurt, when many families and troop members are pushing each other on the platform, before entering the extra troop train in Kyoto station, according to Japanese government official confirmed report.
- March 21 – 1934 Hakodate fire, Japanese government official report, 2166 persons were perished.
- April – Teijin Incident: Ministry of Justice ordered the arrest of the Vice-Minister of Finance, director of the Bank of Taiwan and president of Teijin
- July 3 – Teijin Incident: Prime Minister Saito dissolves the government, on receiving word that a number of cabinet ministers were also scheduled to be arrested.
- September 1 – Toa Special Electric Works, as predecessor of Toa Corporation was founded in Kobe.
- September 21 – 1934 Muroto typhoon
- November – Military Academy Incident
- Unknown date – Showa Rayon, as predecessor of Kureha, founded.

== Births ==
- January 1 – Kiyoshi Kodama, actor (d. 2011)
- January 10 – Hiroyuki Nagato, actor (d. 2011)
- February 3 – Noboru Akiyama, baseball pitcher (d. 2000)
- March 9 – Haruko Wakita, academic (d. 2016)
- April 29 – Akira Takarada, actor
- June 6 – Taichi Yamada, screenwriter and novelist (d. 2023)
- June 8 – Mikio Aoki, politician (d. 2023)
- June 18 – Mitsuteru Yokoyama, manga artist (d. 2004)
- June 25 – Kinya Aikawa, actor, voice actor and tarento (d. 2015)
- June 26 – Toru Goto, freestyle swimmer
- July 14 – Jun Hazumi, voice actor
- July 25 – Kazuya Tatekabe, voice actor (d. 2015)
- August 13 – Gyoji Matsumoto, footballer (d. 2019)
- August 20 – Yoko Tsukasa, actress
- August 27 – Macoto Takahashi, manga artist (d. 2024)
- September 20 – Takayuki Kubota, Japanese-American martial artist and actor
- September 26 – Shinji Maki, comedian (d. 2013)
- October 20 – Empress Michiko, wife of emperor Akihito
- November 22 – Osamu Kobayashi, voice actor (d. 2011)
- December 28 – Yujiro Ishihara, actor and singer (d. 1987)

== Deaths ==
- January 9 – Hakaru Hashimoto, medical scientist (b. 1881)
- January 13 – Bunzō Hayata, botanist (b. 1874)
- January 16 – Tokihiko Okada, silent film actor (b. 1903)
- February 24 – Sanjugo Naoki, novelist (b. 1891)
- May 30 – Tōgō Heihachirō, admiral of the fleet (b. 1848)
- June 26 – Naitō Torajirō, historian and Sinologist (b. 1866)
- September 1 – Yumeji Takehisa, nihonga painter (b. 1884)

== See also ==
- List of Japanese films of the 1930s
