= 1877 in Japan =

- Decades: 1850s; 1860s; 1870s; 1880s; 1890s
- See also: Other events of 1877; History of Japan • Timeline • Years

Events in the year 1877 in Japan.

== Incumbents ==
- Emperor: Emperor Meiji
- Empress consort: Empress Shōken

=== Governors ===
- Aichi Prefecture: Taihe Yasujo
- Akita Prefecture: Kunishi Senkichi
- Aomori Prefecture: J. Hishida
- Ehime Prefecture: Takatoshi Iwamura
- Fukushima Prefecture: Taihe Yasujo
- Gifu Prefecture: Toshi Kozaki
- Gunma Prefecture: Katori Yoshihiko
- Hiroshima Prefecture: Fujii Benzō
- Ibaraki Prefecture: ..... then Baron Tatsutaro Nomura
- Iwate Prefecture: Korekiyo Shima
- Kumamoto Prefecture: Takaaki Tomioka
- Kochi Prefecture: Viscount Kunitake Watanabe
- Kyoto Prefecture: Baron Masanao Makimura
- Mie Prefecture: Sadamedaka Iwamura
- Miyagi Prefecture: Tokisuke Miyagi
- Nagano Prefecture: Narasaki Hiroshi
- Niigata Prefecture: Nagayama Sheng Hui
- Oita Prefecture: Shinichi Kagawa
- Osaka Prefecture: Viscount Norobu Watanabe
- Saitama Prefecture: Tasuke Shirane
- Shimane Prefecture: Jiro Sakai
- Tochigi Prefecture: Miki Nabeshima
- Tokyo: Masataka Kusumoto
- Yamagata Prefecture: Viscount Mishima Michitsune

== Events ==
- January 4 – Land tax reform is implemented.
- January 29-September 24 – Satsuma Rebellion
- February 19-April 12 – Siege of Kumamoto Castle
- March 3–20 – Battle of Tabaruzaka
- September 24 – Battle of Shiroyama

== Deaths ==
September 24 – Saigō Takamori and Kirino Toshiaki
