= 1996 in Japan =

- Decades: 1970s; 1980s; 1990s; 2000s; 2010s
- See also: Other events of 1996; History of Japan; Timeline; Years

Events in the year 1996 in Japan.

The year 1996 corresponded to Heisei 8 (平成8年) in the Japanese calendar.

== Incumbents ==
- Emperor: Akihito
- Prime Minister: Tomiichi Murayama (S–Ōita) until January 11, Ryūtarō Hashimoto (L–Okayama)
- Chief Cabinet Secretary: Kōken Nosaka (S–Tottori) until January 11, Seiroku Kajiyama (L–Ibaraki)
- Chief Justice of the Supreme Court: Tōru Miyoshi
- President of the House of Representatives: Takako Doi (S–Hyōgo) until September 27 (dissolution), Sōichirō Itō (L–Miyagi) from November 7
- President of the House of Councillors: Jūrō Saitō (L–Mie)
- Diet sessions: 135th (extraordinary, January 11 to January 13), 136th (regular, January 22 to June 19), 137th (extraordinary, September 27, HR dissolved on same day), 138th (special, November 7 to November 12), 139th (extraordinary, November 29 to December 18)

=== Governors ===
- Aichi Prefecture: Reiji Suzuki
- Akita Prefecture: Kikuji Sasaki
- Aomori Prefecture: Morio Kimura
- Chiba Prefecture: Takeshi Numata
- Ehime Prefecture: Sadayuki Iga
- Fukui Prefecture: Yukio Kurita
- Fukuoka Prefecture: Wataru Asō
- Fukushima Prefecture: Eisaku Satō
- Gifu Prefecture: Taku Kajiwara
- Gunma Prefecture: Hiroyuki Kodera
- Hiroshima Prefecture: Yūzan Fujita
- Hokkaido: Tatsuya Hori
- Hyogo Prefecture: Toshitami Kaihara
- Ibaraki Prefecture: Masaru Hashimoto
- Ishikawa Prefecture: Masanori Tanimoto
- Iwate Prefecture: Hiroya Masuda
- Kagawa Prefecture: Jōichi Hirai
- Kagoshima Prefecture: Yoshiteru Tsuchiya (until 26 June); Tatsurō Suga (starting 31 July)
- Kanagawa Prefecture: Hiroshi Okazaki
- Kochi Prefecture: Daijiro Hashimoto
- Kumamoto Prefecture: Joji Fukushima
- Kyoto Prefecture: Teiichi Aramaki
- Mie Prefecture: Masayasu Kitagawa
- Miyagi Prefecture: Shirō Asano
- Miyazaki Prefecture: Suketaka Matsukata
- Nagano Prefecture: Gorō Yoshimura
- Nagasaki Prefecture: Isamu Takada
- Nara Prefecture: Yoshiya Kakimoto
- Niigata Prefecture: Ikuo Hirayama
- Oita Prefecture: Morihiko Hiramatsu
- Okayama Prefecture: Shiro Nagano (until 12 November); Masahiro Ishii (starting 12 November)
- Okinawa Prefecture: Masahide Ōta
- Osaka Prefecture: Knock Yokoyama
- Saga Prefecture: Isamu Imoto
- Saitama Prefecture: Yoshihiko Tsuchiya
- Shiga Prefecture: Minoru Inaba
- Shiname Prefecture: Nobuyoshi Sumita
- Shizuoka Prefecture: Yoshinobu Ishikawa
- Tochigi Prefecture: Fumio Watanabe
- Tokushima Prefecture: Toshio Endo
- Tokyo: Yukio Aoshima
- Tottori Prefecture: Yuji Nishio
- Toyama Prefecture: Yutaka Nakaoki
- Wakayama Prefecture: Isamu Nishiguchi
- Yamagata Prefecture: Kazuo Takahashi
- Yamaguchi Prefecture: Toru Hirai (until 22 August); Sekinari Nii (starting 22 August)
- Yamanashi Prefecture: Ken Amano

== Events ==
- January 11 – Ryutaro Hashimoto, leader of the Liberal Democratic Party, becomes Prime Minister.
- February 10 – A boulder falls onto the Toyohama Tunnel in Furubira, Hokkaido, crushing a bus and several cars and resulting in 20 fatalities.
- February 27 – Red and Green was released in Japan as the first game in the Pokémon series.
- April 1 – Tokyo Big Sight opens.
- June 13 – Garuda Indonesia Flight 865 crashes on takeoff from Fukuoka Airport, resulting in three fatalities.
- June 23 – The Nintendo 64 home video game console is released in Japan.
- June 25 – A train on the Takayama Main Line collides with a fallen boulder, resulting in 16 injuries.
- July 16 – An outbreak of E. coli food poisoning in Sakai City resulted in 6309 schoolchildren and 92 school staff members from 62 municipal elementary schools falling ill.
- August 8 – Tokyo Opera City Tower is completed.
- September 29 – According to Japan National Police Agency official confirmed report, three vehicles collided on Route 9 in Muraoka, Hyōgo Prefecture, with a total of 11 deaths.
- November 12 – Skymark Airlines was established.
- November 26 – Tamagotchi is released.
- December 6 – Gamahara Swamp Landslide disaster, A landslide recurs, during restoration work for landslide by heaviest rain hit in July 1995, borders between Nagano Prefecture and Niigata Prefecture, according to Japan Fire and Disaster Management Agency confirmed report, 14 workers lost their lives and 9 were wounded.

== Births ==
- January 10 – Sakurako Ohara, actress and singer
- January 12 – Ai Hashimoto, actress and fashion model
- January 13 – Ami Inamura, gravure idol, and sportscaster
- February 7 – Mai Hagiwara, singer
- February 10
  - Shiori Niiyama, singer and songwriter
  - Ukyo Shuto, professional baseball player
- February 16 – Nana Komatsu, actress and model
- February 18 – Ikumi Hisamatsu, fashion model and actress
- April 3 – Mayo Hibi, tennis player
- May 18 – Yuki Kadono, snowboarder
- May 21 – Sarina Koga, volleyball player
- May 28 – Ayano Kudo, model and actress
- June 7 – Sayuri, singer-songwriter (d. 2024)
- June 11
  - Naoki Maeda, footballer
  - Ayaka Sasaki, singer
- June 13 – Kocchi no Kento, singer-songwriter
- June 18 – Ayaka Miyoshi, actress and model
- June 30 – Kazuma Okamoto, professional baseball player (Tokyo Giants)
- July 5 – Risa Shoji, figure skater
- July 18 – Shiina Natsukawa, voice actress and singer
- August 24 – Kenzo Shirai, gymnast
- September 6 – Rika Hongo, figure skater
- September 12 – Nakamura Umemaru, actor
- September 15 – Nao Furuhata, idol singer
- September 16 – Ryusei Yokohama, actor
- September 19 – Haruka Kodama, idol singer
- September 23 – Takashi Matsuo, actor
- October 8 – Sara Takanashi, ski jumper
- October 30;
  - Mizuki Fukumura, singer
  - Shori Sato, actor, model, singer and pop idol
- November 9 – Momo Hirai, singer and member of South Korean girl group Twice
- November 15 – Kanako Watanabe, swimmer
- November 16 – Hiroshi Kaino, professional baseball player
- November 18 – Saki Ogawa, singer
- December 2 – Minato Oike, BMX freestyle cyclist
- December 12 – Karen Miyama, actress
- December 13 – Miu Sato, figure skater
- December 29 – Sana Minatozaki, singer and member of South Korean girl group Twice

== Deaths ==
- January 7 – Tarō Okamoto, artist (b. 1911)
- January 8 – Michiya Mihashi, enka singer (b. 1930)
- February 5 – Hideo Oguni, writer (b. 1904)
- February 12 – Ryōtarō Shiba, writer (b. 1923)
- February 20 – Tōru Takemitsu, composer (b. 1930)
- May 11 – Yasuko Namba, mountaineer, summited the Seven Summits (b. 1949)
- June 6 – Kusuo Kitamura, Olympic swimmer (b. 1917)
- July 30 – Arihiro Hase, actor (b. 1965)
- August 4 – Kiyoshi Atsumi, actor (Otoko wa Tsurai yo) (b. 1928)
- September 23 – Fujiko F. Fujio, cartoonist (b. 1933)
- September 29 – Shūsaku Endō, novelist (b. 1923)
- November 9 – Yoshimi Ueda, basketball player and administrator (b. 1906)

== See also ==
- 1996 in Japanese television
- List of Japanese films of 1996
