= 1879 in Japan =

- Decades: 1850s; 1860s; 1870s; 1880s; 1890s
- See also: Other events of 1879; History of Japan • Timeline • Years

Events in the year 1879 in Japan. It corresponds to Meiji 12 in the Japanese calendar.

== Incumbents ==
- Monarch: Emperor Meiji

=== Governors ===
- Aichi Prefecture: Taihe Yasujo
- Akita Prefecture: Ishida Eikichi
- Aomori Prefecture: J. Hishida then Hidenori Yamada
- Ehime Prefecture: Baron Takatoshi Iwamura
- Fukushima Prefecture: Taihe Yasujo
- Gifu Prefecture: Toshi Kozaki
- Gunma Prefecture: Katori Yoshihiko
- Hiroshima Prefecture: Benzō Fujii
- Ibaraki Prefecture: Baron Tatsutaro Nomura then Hitomi Katsutaro
- Iwate Prefecture: Korekiyo Shima
- Kumamoto Prefecture: Takaaki Tomioka
- Kochi Prefecture: Viscount Kunitake Watanabe then Baron Kokuritsu Kitagaki
- Kyoto Prefecture: Baron Masanao Makimura
- Mie Prefecture: Sadamedaka Iwamura
- Miyagi Prefecture: Baron Matsudaira Masanao
- Nagano Prefecture: Narasaki Hiroshi
- Niigata Prefecture: Nagayama Sheng Hui
- Oita Prefecture: Shinichi Kagawa then Ryokichi Nishimura
- Osaka Prefecture: Viscount Norobu Watanabe
- Saitama Prefecture: Tasuke Shirane
- Shimane Prefecture: Jiro Sakai
- Tochigi Prefecture: Miki Nabeshima
- Tokyo: Masataka Kusumoto then Matsuda Michiyuki
- Yamagata Prefecture: Viscount Mishima Michitsune

== Births ==
- January 18 – Tane Ikai, super-centenarian (d. 1995)
- August 24 – Rentarō Taki, pianist (d. 1903)
- August 31 – Taishō, 123rd Emperor of Japan (d. 1926)
- October 1 – Hasegawa Shigure, playwright (d. 1941)
- December 3 – Kafū Nagai, author, playwright, essayist, and diarist (d. 1959)
