= 1886 in Japan =

- Decades: 1860s; 1870s; 1880s; 1890s; 1900s
- See also: Other events of 1886; History of Japan • Timeline • Years

Events in the year 1886 in Japan. It corresponds to Meiji 19 (明治19年) in the Japanese calendar.

== Incumbents ==
- Monarch: Emperor Meiji
- Prime Minister: Itō Hirobumi

=== Governors ===
- Aichi Prefecture: Minoru Katsumata
- Akita Prefecture: Akagawa then Sada Aoyama
- Aomori Prefecture: Kyusei Fukushima then Nabeshima Miki
- Ehime Prefecture: Shinpei Seki
- Fukui Prefecture: Tsutomu Ishiguro
- Fukuoka Prefecture: Yasujo
- Fukushima Prefecture: Kinichi Akashi then Hiraochi Orita
- Gifu Prefecture: Toshi Kozaki
- Gunma Prefecture: Katori Yoshihiko
- Hiroshima Prefecture: Senda Sadaaki
- Ibaraki Prefecture: Shima Isei then Sadanori Yasuda
- Iwate Prefecture: Shoichiro Ishii
- Kanagawa Prefecture: Baron Tadatsu Hayashi
- Kochi Prefecture: Yoshiaki Tonabe
- Kumamoto Prefecture: Yoshiaki Tonabe
- Kyoto Prefecture: Baron Utsumi Tadakatsu
- Mie Prefecture: Ishii Kuni
- Miyagi Prefecture: Matsudaira Masanao
- Miyazaki Prefecture: Teru Tananbe
- Nagano Prefecture: Baron Seiichiro Kinashi
- Niigata Prefecture: Shinozaki Goro
- Oita Prefecture: Ryokichi Nishimura
- Okinawa Prefecture: Sadakiyo Osako then Minoru Fukuhara
- Osaka Prefecture: Tateno Tsuyoshi
- Saga Prefecture: Kamata Kagehisa
- Saitama Prefecture: Kiyohide Yoshida
- Shimane Prefecture: Sada Kotedayasu
- Tochigi Prefecture: Sukeo Kabayama
- Tokyo: Watanabe Hiromoto then Marquis Shigeru Hachisuke
- Toyama Prefecture: Kunishige Masafuni then Fujishima Masaki
- Yamagata Prefecture: Orita Hirauchi then Shibahara Sum

== Events ==
- January 26 – The Hokkaidō Agency opens, with its main office in Sapporo and branch offices in Hakodate and Nemuro.

== Births ==
- January 28 – Hidetsugu Yagi, electrical engineer (d. 1976)
- February 10 – Raichō Hiratsuka, writer, journalist, political activist (d. 1971)
- February 20 – Takuboku Ishikawa, poet (d. 1912)
- February 23 – Yahiko Mishima, athlete (d. 1954)
- May 20 – Chieko Takamura, artist (d. 1938)
- June 9 – Kosaku Yamada, composer and conductor (d. 1965)
- June 10 – Sessue Hayakawa, actor (d. 1973)
- June 18 – Tsuruko Haraguchi, psychologist and the first Japanese woman to receive a Doctor of Philosophy (d. 1915)
- July 17 – Chizuko Mifune, clairvoyant (d. 1911)
- July 20 – Misao Fujimura, student and poet (d. 1903)
- July 24 – Jun'ichirō Tanizaki, writer and novelist (d. 1965)
- November 1
  - Sakutarō Hagiwara, writer (d. 1942)
  - Sumako Matsui, actress and singer (d. 1919)
- November 27 – Tsuguharu Foujita, painter (d. 1968)
