= 1876 in Japan =

- Decades: 1850s; 1860s; 1870s; 1880s; 1890s
- See also: Other events of 1876; History of Japan • Timeline • Years

Events in the year 1876 in Japan.

== Incumbents ==
- Emperor: Emperor Meiji
- Empress consort: Empress Shōken

=== Governors ===
- Aichi Prefecture: Taihe Yasujo
- Akita Prefecture: Ishida Eikichi
- Aomori Prefecture: J. Hishida
- Ehime Prefecture: Takatoshi Iwamura
- Fukushima Prefecture: Morisuke Yamayoshi
- Gifu Prefecture: Toshi Kozaki
- Gunma Prefecture: vacant
- Hiroshima Prefecture: Fujii Benzō
- Ibaraki Prefecture: .....
- Iwate Prefecture: Korekiyo Shima
- Kagawa Prefecture: Nitta Yoshio then Kunitake Watanabe
- Kochi Prefecture: Iwasaki Nagatake then Kunitake Watanabe
- Kyoto Prefecture: Masanao Makimura
- Mie Prefecture: Sadamedaka Iwamura
- Miyazaki Prefecture: Weiken Fukuyama
- Nagano Prefecture: Narasaki Hiroshi
- Niigata Prefecture: Nagayama Sheng Hui
- Oita Prefecture: Kei Morishita then Shinichi Kagawa
- Osaka Prefecture: Norobu Watanabe
- Saga Prefecture: Hidotemo Kitashima
- Saitama Prefecture: Tasuke Shirane
- Shiname Prefecture: Kamiyama Ren
- Tochigi Prefecture: Iseki Ushitora
- Tokyo: Masataka Kusumoto
- Toyama Prefecture: Hidenori Yamada
- Yamaguchi Prefecture: Mishima Michitsune

== Events ==
- March 28 – Haitō Edict
- October 24–25 – Shinpūren Rebellion
- October 27-November 24 – Akizuki Rebellion
- October 28-November 5 – Hagi Rebellion

== Births ==
- February 23 – Senjiro Hayashi

== Deaths ==
- Otaguro Tomoo
