= 1998 in Japan =

- Decades: 1970s; 1980s; 1990s; 2000s; 2010s
- See also: Other events of 1998; History of Japan; Timeline; Years

Events in the year 1998 in Japan. It corresponds to the year Heisei 10 (平成10年) in the Japanese calendar.

== Incumbents ==
- Emperor: Akihito
- Prime Minister: Ryutaro Hashimoto (L–Okayama) until July 30, Keizo Obuchi (L–Gunma)
- Chief Cabinet Secretary: Kanezō Muraoka (L–Akita) until July 30, Hiromu Nonaka (L–Kyōto)
- Chief Justice of the Supreme Court: Shigeru Yamaguchi
- President of the House of Representatives: Sōichirō Itō (L–Miyagi)
- President of the House of Councillors: Jūrō Saitō (L–Mie) until July 25 and again from August 4
- Diet sessions: 142nd (regular, January 12 to June 18), 143rd (extraordinary, August 7 to October 16), 144th (extraordinary, November 27 to December 14)

=== Governors ===
- Aichi Prefecture: Reiji Suzuki
- Akita Prefecture: Sukeshiro Terata
- Aomori Prefecture: Morio Kimura
- Chiba Prefecture: Takeshi Numata
- Ehime Prefecture: Sadayuki Iga
- Fukui Prefecture: Yukio Kurita
- Fukuoka Prefecture: Wataru Asō
- Fukushima Prefecture: Eisaku Satō
- Gifu Prefecture: Taku Kajiwara
- Gunma Prefecture: Hiroyuki Kodera
- Hiroshima Prefecture: Yūzan Fujita
- Hokkaido: Tatsuya Hori
- Hyogo Prefecture: Toshitami Kaihara
- Ibaraki Prefecture: Masaru Hashimoto
- Ishikawa Prefecture: Masanori Tanimoto
- Iwate Prefecture: Hiroya Masuda
- Kagawa Prefecture: Jōichi Hirai (until 4 September); Takeki Manabe (starting 5 September)
- Kagoshima Prefecture: Tatsurō Suga
- Kanagawa Prefecture: Hiroshi Okazaki
- Kochi Prefecture: Daijiro Hashimoto
- Kumamoto Prefecture: Joji Fukushima
- Kyoto Prefecture: Teiichi Aramaki
- Mie Prefecture: Masayasu Kitagawa
- Miyagi Prefecture: Shirō Asano
- Miyazaki Prefecture: Suketaka Matsukata
- Nagano Prefecture: Gorō Yoshimura
- Nagasaki Prefecture: Isamu Takada (until 1 March); Genjirō Kaneko (starting 2 March)
- Nara Prefecture: Yoshiya Kakimoto
- Niigata Prefecture: Ikuo Hirayama
- Oita Prefecture: Morihiko Hiramatsu
- Okayama Prefecture: Masahiro Ishii
- Okinawa Prefecture: Masahide Ōta (until 10 December); Keiichi Inamine (starting 10 December)
- Osaka Prefecture: Knock Yokoyama
- Saga Prefecture: Isamu Imoto
- Saitama Prefecture: Yoshihiko Tsuchiya
- Shiga Prefecture: Minoru Inaba (until 20 July); Yoshitsugu Kunimatsu (starting 20 July)
- Shiname Prefecture: Nobuyoshi Sumita
- Shizuoka Prefecture: Yoshinobu Ishikawa
- Tochigi Prefecture: Fumio Watanabe
- Tokushima Prefecture: Toshio Endo
- Tokyo: Yukio Aoshima
- Tottori Prefecture: Yuji Nishio
- Toyama Prefecture: Yutaka Nakaoki
- Wakayama Prefecture: Isamu Nishiguchi
- Yamagata Prefecture: Kazuo Takahashi
- Yamaguchi Prefecture: Sekinari Nii
- Yamanashi Prefecture: Ken Amano

== Events ==
- February 7 – February 22: The 1998 Winter Olympics are held in Nagano.
- March 5 – March 14: The 1998 Winter Paralympics are held in Nagano.
- April 1: Toyota City, Fukuyama City, Kōchi City and Miyazaki City become core cities.
- April 5: The Akashi-Kaikyo Bridge linking Shikoku with Honshū and costing about ¥ 500 billion (US$3.8 billion), opens to traffic, becoming the largest suspension bridge in the world.
- May 26: Takashi Imai is inaugurated as the 9th head of the Keidanren.
- June 22: Financial Services Agency established.
- July 5: Japan launches the Nozomi probe to Mars, joining the United States and Russia as an outer space-exploring nation.
- July 12: Election for the House of Councillors held.
- July 25: Masumi Hayashi poisons a curry pot at a festival in Wakayama, causing the death of two adults and two children.
- August 11: The USS Kitty Hawk CV-63 arrives at U.S. Fleet Activities Yokosuka, replacing the USS Independence CV-62 as the U.S. Navy's forward-deployed carrier in Japan.
- September 3: Metal Gear Solid is first released for the PS1 in Japan.
- September 7: Serial Experiments Lain Episode 10: LOVE is released in Japan.
- September 22 – 23: Typhoon Vivki causes damage to several cultural heritage sites in Wakayama, Nara, Kyoto and Shiga Prefecture and causing 19 deaths.
- October 8: Japan-South Korea Joint Declaration of 1998.
- November 1: The Japanese Grand Prix sees Mika Häkkinen win his first F1 Drivers' Championship and McLaren's last Constructors title until 2024.
- November 13: Free solo climber Alain Robert scales the Shinjuku Center Building and is arrested on its roof.
- November 26: Japan-China Joint Declaration On Building a Partnership of Friendship and Cooperation for Peace and Development.
- November 27: The Dreamcast is released in Japan.
- December 18: Mario Party is released in Japan.
- December 23: Sonic Adventure is released in Japan.

== Births ==
- January 5 – Marie Iitoyo, model and actress
- January 23 – Yuto Adachi, singer and member of South Korean boy band Pentagon
- February 8 – Rui Hachimura, basketball player
- March 19 – Sakura Miyawaki, singer and member of South Korean girl group Le Sserafim
- March 26 – Satoko Miyahara, figure skater
- April 6 – Rina Katsuta, singer
- April 10 – Airi Kinoshita, murder victim (d. 2005)
- April 28 – Manamo Miyata, singer and member of Hinatazaka46
- May 13 – Karen Iwata, singer and voice actress
- May 28 – Riho Sayashi, J-pop singer
- May 31 – Ryang Hyon-ju, North Korean, footballer
- June 14 – Taishi Nakagawa, actor and model
- June 19 – Suzu Hirose, model and actress
- July 9 – Tiger Onitsuka, jazz drummer
- July 16 – Rina Matsuno, singer (d. 2017)
- July 26 – Maya Sakura, singer
- July 27 – Risa Watanabe, idol and model
- August 5 – Kanon Suzuki, singer
- August 17 – Yoshinobu Yamamoto, professional baseball player
- August 28 – Haruka Fukuhara, actress, model and singer
- August 29 – Yui Kawamoto, professional golfer
- September 29 – Aoi Fujino, gravure idol (d. 2026)
- October 30 – Meimi Tamura, singer and actress
- November 12 – Yuna Taira, actress
- November 29 – Ayumu Hirano, snowboarder
- December 24 – Keito Tsuna, actor
- December 30 – Akari Uemura, pop singer

== Deaths ==
- January 9 – Kenichi Fukui, Japanese chemist, Nobel Prize laureate (b. 1918)
- January 21 – Yoshifumi Kondō, animator (b. 1950)
- January 26 – Shinichi Suzuki, violinist (b. 1898)
- January 27 – Tamio Kageyama, novelist (b. 1947)
- January 28 – Shotaro Ishinomori, Manga artist, "Father of Henshin heroes." (b. 1938)
- February 5 – Takahashi Chikuzan, Tsugaru-jamisen performer and composer (b. 1910)
- March 10 – Kenkō Satoshi, Sumo wrestler (b. 1967)
- March 13 – Kosho Uchiyama, Sōtō priest (b. 1912)
- April 20 – Yoshio Inaba, actor (b. 1920)
- May 2 – Matsumoto Hideto (hide), Japanese musician (b. 1964)
- May 10 – Nekojiru, manga artist (b. 1967)
- May 19 – Sōsuke Uno, Prime Minister (b. 1922)
- August 3 – Reizo Koike, breaststroke swimmer (b. 1915)
- August 28 – Hirokazu Kobayashi, aikidoka (b. 1929)
- September 6 – Akira Kurosawa, screenwriter, producer, and director (b. 1910)
- September 27 – Narita Bryan, racehorse (b. 1991)
- October 12 – Ineko Sata, communist and feminist author of proletarian literature (b. 1904)
- November 1 – Silence Suzuka, racehorse (b. 1994)
- November 5 – Momoko Kōchi, actress (b. 1932)
- December 1 – Shōji Nakayama, actor (b. 1928)
- December 2 – Mikio Oda, athlete (b. 1905)
- December 30 – Keisuke Kinoshita, film director (b. 1912)

== See also ==
- 1998 in Japanese television
- List of Japanese films of 1998
