= 1936 in Japan =

- Decades: 1910s; 1920s; 1930s; 1940s; 1950s
- See also: Other events of 1936; History of Japan • Timeline • Years

Events in the year 1936 in Japan. It corresponds to Shōwa 11 (昭和11年) in the Japanese calendar.

== Incumbents ==
- Emperor: Hirohito
- Prime Minister:
  - Keisuke Okada, until March 9
  - Kōki Hirota, from March 9

== Events ==
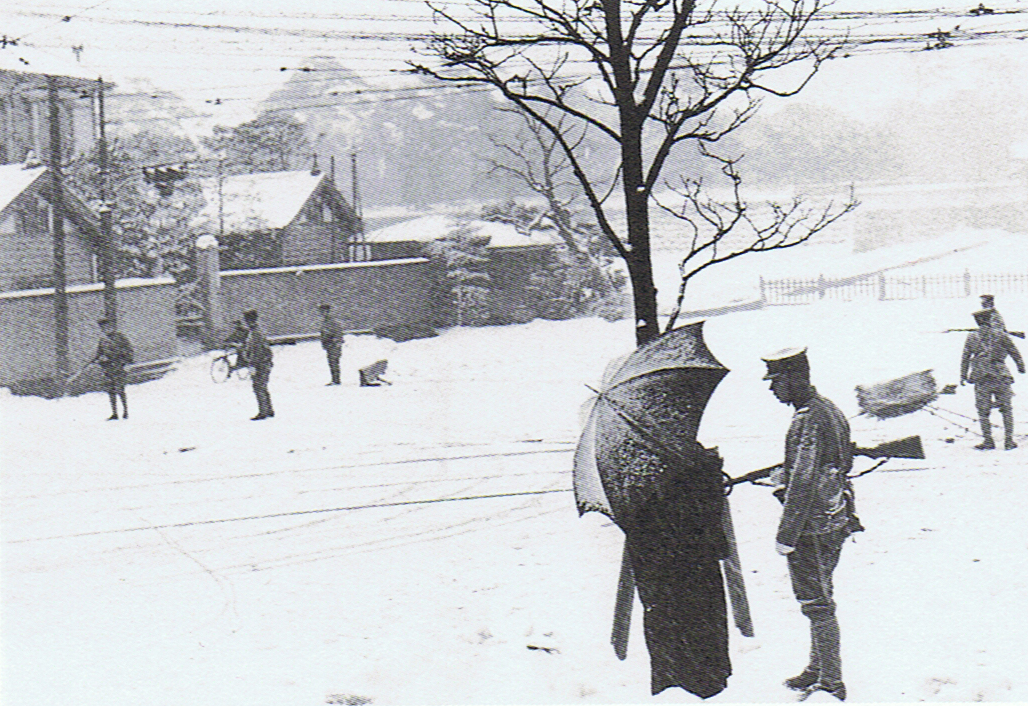
Hanzōmon, February 26, 1936

- February 5 – Japanese Baseball League is founded.
- February 6 – Ricoh founded.
- February 21 – According to USGS official report, a Richer scale 6.0 earthquake hit on Mount Nijō, Nara Prefecture, according to Japanese government official confirmed report, kills nine persons and injures 59 persons.
- February 26–29 – February 26 Incident (二・二六事件, Niniroku Jiken): The Imperial Way Faction engineers a failed coup against the Japanese government; some politicians are killed.
- February 27 – Tokyo is placed under martial law (not to be repealed until July 16)
- February 29
  - Prime Minister Keisuke Okada, a target in the February 26 incident, emerges from hiding.
  - Emperor Hirohito orders the Japanese army to arrest 123 conspirators in Tokyo government offices; 19 of them are executed in July.
  - Facing overwhelming opposition as the army moved against them, the rebels surrender
- March 4 – The Emperor signs an ordinance on March 4 establishing a Special Court Martial (特設軍法会議 tokusetsu gunpō kaigi) to try those involved in the February 26 uprising.
- March 9 – Pro-democratic militarist Keisuke Okada steps down as Prime Minister of Japan and is replaced by radical militarist Kōki Hirota.
- March 12 – Ukichiro Nakaya creates the first artificial snow crystal.
- May 11 – According to Japanese government and former Japan Health and Welfare Ministry official report, a massive food poisoning hit, many attend and their families presented Daifuku rice cake eat, after 2,200 persons affective salmonella infection in junior high-school sports festival in Hamamatsu, Shizuoka Prefecture, total 29 students and 15 parents and families were lost to lives.
- May 18 – Sada Abe strangled her lover with an obi and then cut off his genitals to carry around with her as a souvenir. When the crime was discovered the next day it became a national sensation and would be the subject of many books and movies over the decades to follow.
- July 31 – The International Olympic Committee announces that the 1940 Summer Olympics will be held in Tokyo. However, the games are given back to the IOC after the Second Sino-Japanese War breaks out, and are eventually cancelled altogether because of World War II.
- August 1–August 16 – Japan competes at the 1936 Summer Olympics in Berlin, Germany. Japan wins six gold medals, four silvers, and eight Bronze.
- November 20 – Mitsubishi Osarizawa mine and Nakazawa dam collapse by heavy rain, total 362 persons fatalities in Akita Prefecture, according to Japanese government official confirmed report.
- Unknown date – Bousei-gakujuku, as predecessor of Tokai University was founded in Musashino, Tokyo.

== Films ==
- The Only Son (1936 film)

== Births ==
- January 24 – Etsuko Ichihara, (d. 2019)
- February 20 – Shigeo Nagashima, professional baseball player, coach (d. 2025)
- April 10 – Makoto Wada, illustrator, essayist and film director
- April 22 – Takeshi Koba, professional baseball player and coach
- June 19 – Takeshi Aono, voice actor (d. 2012)
- June 27 – Tadanori Yokoo, graphic designer, illustrator, print maker and painter.
- July 8 – Kazuhiro Tanaka, modern pentathlete
- July 16
  - Yasuo Fukuda, 58th Prime Minister of Japan (d. 2026)
  - Akira Kinoshita, photographer
- July 23 – Keiichi Tanaami, pop artist (d. 2015)
- August 11 – Mitsutoshi Furuya, comic artist (d. 2021)
- September 3 – Ikki Kajiwara, author, manga writer, and film producer (d. 1987)
- September 4 – Yoshihisa Yoshikawa, sport shooter (d. 2019)
- October 12 – Minoru Murayama, Japanese baseball pitcher (d. 1998)
- October 14 – Fuyumi Shiraishi, voice actress (d. 2019)
- October 16 – Akira Machida, Chief Justice of the Supreme Court of Japan (d. 2015)
- October 25 – Masako Nozawa, voice actress
- October 29 – Akiko Kojima, model and beauty queen
- October 31 – Shigeo Takii, supreme court justice (d. 2015)
- December 4 – Michiko Yamamoto, writer and poet

== Deaths ==
- January 11 – Ikuta Chōkō, translator, author and literary critic (b. 1882)
- February 1 – Genji Matsuda, politician and cabinet minister (b. 1876)
- February 26
  - Saitō Makoto, naval officer and politician (19th Prime Minister of Japan) (b. 1858)
  - Takahashi Korekiyo, politician and Governor of the Bank of Japan (b. 1854)
  - Jōtarō Watanabe, general (b. 1874)
- February 29 – Shirō Nonaka, Imperial Japanese Army officer (b. 1903)
- March 11 – Yumeno Kyūsaku, writer (b. 1889)
- March 12 – Uchida Kōsai, statesman, diplomat and interim prime minister (b. 1865)
- March 27 – Kawasaki Takukichi, politician and cabinet minister (b. 1871)
- April 8 – Chūhachi Ninomiya, aviation pioneer (b. 1866)
- May 3 – Kikunae Ikeda, chemist (b. 1864
- May 27 – Take Hagiwara, military nurse (b. 1873)
- June 10 – Tsuchida Bakusen, nihonga painter (b. 1887)
- June 27 – Miekichi Suzuki, novelist (b. 1882)
- July 3 – Saburo Aizawa (b. 1889)
- July 12 – Yasuhide Kurihara (b. 1908)
- October 8 – Utako Shimoda, educator and poet (b. 1854)

== See also ==
- List of Japanese films of the 1930s
