= 1885 in Japan =

- Decades: 1860s; 1870s; 1880s; 1890s; 1900s
- See also: Other events of 1885; History of Japan • Timeline • Years

Events in the year 1885 in Japan.

== Incumbents ==
- Monarch: Emperor Meiji
- Prime Minister: Itō Hirobumi (starting December 22)

=== Governors ===
- Aichi Prefecture: Renpei Kunisada then Minoru Katsumata
- Akita Prefecture: Akagawa
- Aomori Prefecture: Kyusei Fukushima
- Ehime Prefecture: Shinpei Seki
- Fukui Prefecture: Tsutomu Ishiguro
- Fukushima Prefecture: Kinichi Akashi
- Gifu Prefecture: Toshi Kozaki
- Gunma Prefecture: Sato Atasesan
- Hiroshima Prefecture: Senda Sadaaki
- Ibaraki Prefecture: Hitomi Katsutaro then Shima Isei
- Iwate Prefecture: Shoichiro Ishii
- Kanagawa Prefecture: Baron Tadatsu Hayashi
- Kochi Prefecture: Yoshiaki Tonabe
- Kumamoto Prefecture: Yoshiaki Tonabe
- Kyoto Prefecture: Baron Utsumi Tadakatsu
- Mie Prefecture: Baron Utsumi Tadakatsu then Ishii Kuni
- Miyagi Prefecture: Matsudaira Masanao
- Miyazaki Prefecture: Teru Tananbe
- Nagano Prefecture: Baron Seiichiro Kinashi
- Niigata Prefecture: Nagayama Sheng Hui then Shinozaki Goro
- Oita Prefecture: Ryokichi Nishimura
- Okinawa Prefecture: Sutezo Nishimura then Sadakiyo Osako
- Osaka Prefecture: Tateno Tsuyoshi
- Saga Prefecture: Kamata Kagehisa
- Saitama Prefecture: Kiyohide Yoshida
- Shimane Prefecture: Tamechika Fujikawa then Sada Kotedayasu
- Tochigi Prefecture: Mishi Michitsune then Sukeo Kabayama
- Tokyo: Yoshikawa Akimasa then Watanabe Hiromoto
- Toyama Prefecture: Kunishige Masafuni
- Yamagata Prefecture: Orita Hirauchi then Shibahara Sum

== Births ==
- January 25 - Kitahara Hakushū (d. 1942), poet and author
- November 8 - Tomoyuki Yamashita (d. 1946), World War II general
