= 1884 in Japan =

- Decades: 1860s; 1870s; 1880s; 1890s; 1900s
- See also: Other events of 1884; History of Japan • Timeline • Years

Events from the year 1884 in Japan.

== Incumbents ==
- Emperor: Emperor Meiji
- Empress consort: Empress Shōken

=== Governors ===
- Aichi Prefecture: Renpei Kunisada
- Akita Prefecture: Akagawa
- Aomori Prefecture: Kyusei Fukushima
- Ehime Prefecture: Shinpei Seki
- Fukui Prefecture: Tsutomu Ishiguro
- Fukushima Prefecture: Michitsume Mishima
- Gifu Prefecture: Toshi Kozaki
- Gunma Prefecture: Katori Yoshihiko
- Hiroshima Prefecture: Senda Sadaaki
- Ibaraki Prefecture: Hitomi Katsutaro
- Iwate Prefecture: Korekiyo Shima then Shoichiro Ishii
- Kanagawa Prefecture: Baron Tadatsu Hayashi
- Kochi Prefecture: Yoshiaki Tonabe
- Kumamoto Prefecture: Yoshiaki Tonabe
- Kyoto Prefecture: Baron Utsumi Tadakatsu
- Mie Prefecture: Sadamedaka Iwamura then Baron Utsumi Tadakatsu
- Miyagi Prefecture: Matsudaira Masanao
- Miyazaki Prefecture: Teru Tananbe
- Nagano Prefecture: Makoto Ono then Baron Seiichiro Kinashi
- Niigata Prefecture: Nagayama Sheng Hui
- Oita Prefecture: Ryokichi Nishimura
- Osaka Prefecture: Tateno Tsuyoshi
- Saga Prefecture: Kamata Eikichi
- Saitama Prefecture: Kiyohide Yoshida
- Shimane Prefecture: Tamechika Fujikawa
- Tochigi Prefecture: Mishi Michitsune
- Tokyo: Earl Kensho Yoshikawa
- Toyama Prefecture: Kunishige Masafuni
- Yamagata Prefecture: Orita Hirauchi

== Events ==
- November - Chichibu Incident
- Unknown date – Yamada Electronic Wire Manufacturing, as predecessor of Furukawa Electronic Work has founded.

== Births ==
- January 1 - Chikuhei Nakajima (d. 1949), naval officer, engineer, and politician, founded Nakajima Aircraft Company
- January 4 - Gyosaku Morozumi, (d. 1963), general in the Imperial Japanese Army
- January 14 - Tetsuzan Nagata, (d. 1935), general in the Imperial Japanese Army
- February 22 - Tamaki Miura (d. 1946), operatic soprano
- April 4 - Isoroku Yamamoto (d. 1943), Marshal Admiral of the Navy and the commander-in-chief of the Combined Fleet during World War II
- December 30 - Hideki Tojo (d. 1948), leader of the Imperial Rule Assistance Association and the 40th Prime Minister of Japan

== Deaths ==
- Oura Okei (b. 1828), businesswoman
