= Itsumi =

Itsumi (written: 逸見) is a Japanese surname. Notable people with the surname include:

- Masataka Itsumi (逸見 政孝, 1945–1993), Japanese announcer, singer and writer

Itsumi (written: 逸美) is also a feminine Japanese given name. Notable people with the name include:

- Itsumi Osawa (大沢 逸美, born 1966), Japanese actress
