= Takii =

Takii (written: 滝井) is a Japanese surname. Notable people with the surname include:

- Kōsaku Takii (滝井 孝作, 1894–1984), Japanese poet
- Shigeo Takii (滝井 繁男, 1936–2015), Japanese judge

== See also ==
- Takii Station, a railway station in Moriguchi, Osaka Prefecture, Japan
