= 1932 in Japanese football =

1932 season

Japanese football in 1932.

== Emperor's Cup ==
April 3, 1933

Keio Club	5–1	Yoshino Club
? ?' ? ?' ? ?' ? ?' ? ?'		? ?'

Koshien South Ground

== Births ==
- January 25 - Yukio Shimomura
- February 5 - Hiroaki Sato
- August 25 - Tomohiko Ikoma
- December 25 - Michihiro Ozawa
