= Tomohiko Ikoma =

Japanese footballer and manager

Tomohiko Ikoma 生駒 友彦
Personal information
- Full name: Tomohiko Ikoma
- Date of birth: August 25, 1932
- Place of birth: Hyogo, Empire of Japan
- Date of death: April 27, 2009 (aged 76)
- Place of death: Kobe, Hyogo, Japan
- Height: 1.74 m (5 ft 8 1/2 in)
- Position: Goalkeeper

Youth career
- 1948–1950: Kobe High School
- 1951–1954: Kwansei Gakuin University

Senior career*
Years	Team	Apps	(Gls)
1955–1966	Mitsubishi Motors	0	(0)
Total		0	(0)

International career
1955	Japan	5	(0)

Managerial career
- 1966: Mitsubishi Motors
Medal record
All Kwangaku
Winner	Emperor's Cup	1953
Winner	Emperor's Cup	1955
- * Club domestic league appearances and goals

Tomohiko Ikoma (生駒 友彦, Ikoma Tomohiko; August 25, 1932 – April 27, 2009) was a Japanese football player and manager. He played for Japan national team.

== Club career ==
Ikoma was born in Hyogo Prefecture on August 25, 1932. When he was a Kwansei Gakuin University student, he won 1953 and 1955 Emperor's Cup as a member of All Kwangaku was consisted of his alma mater Kwansei Gakuin University players and graduates. After graduating from university, he joined Mitsubishi Motors in 1955. In 1965, joined new league Japan Soccer League. He did not play in the league. He retired in 1966.

== National team career ==
On January 2, 1955, when Ikoma was a Kwansei Gakuin University student, he debuted for Japan national team against Burma. He played 5 games for Japan in 1955.

== Coaching career ==
In 1966, when Ikoma played for Mitsubishi Motors, he became a playing manager and managed the club 1 season. End of 1966 season, he resigned as manager and retired from playing career.

On April 27, 2009, Ikoma died in Kobe at the age of 76.

== Club statistics ==
Club performance			League	
Season	Club	League	Apps	Goals
Japan			League	
1965	Mitsubishi Motors	JSL Division 1	0	0
1966	Mitsubishi Motors	JSL Division 1	0	0
Total			0	0

== National team statistics ==
Japan national team
Year	Apps	Goals
1955	5	0
Total	5	0
