= Hiroshi Kajikawa =

Japanese archer (born 1949)

Hiroshi Kajikawa (梶川 博, Kajikawa Hiroshi) (born 3 March 1949) is a former archer who, at his peak, represented Japan in the 1972 Munich Olympics. He previously held the 90 meter world record in the FITA Gents Round.

Currently he coaches various university teams in the Kansai region of Japan. He also runs his own archery store part-time.
