= Shigeo Takii =

Shigeo Takii (滝井 繁男, Takii Shigeo; October 31, 1936 – February 28, 2015) was a justice of the Supreme Court of Japan.
