= Masataka Itsumi =

Japanese television personality and entertainer

- 逸見政孝
- Masataka Itsumi
- Born: February 16, 1945; Abeno-ku, Osaka, Osaka, Osaka Prefecture
- Died: December 25, 1993 (aged 48); Tokyo Women's Medical University Hospital, Shinjuku, Tokyo
- Burial place: Denjo-ji, Setagaya, Tokyo
- Education: Waseda University
- Years active: 1968-1993
- Spouse: Harue Itsumi (married 1970)
- Children: 2 (Taro and Ai)

Masataka Itsumi (逸見 政孝, Itsumi Masataka; February 16, 1945 – December 25, 1993) was a Japanese television announcer, tarento, writer, singer and master of ceremonies. His nickname was "It's me". He was friends with Shingo Yamashiro. His son, Taro Itsumi is an actor, and his daughter, Ai Itsumi is an actress, tarento, and announcer.

Born in Osaka, Itsumi became a popular master of ceremonies. He was the only person who was able to govern three big talents; Takeshi Kitano, Sanma Akashiya and Tamori. On 6 September 1993, he announced that he was suffering from stomach cancer. Japanese mass media reported on his condition. He died of linitis plastica on December 25, 1993, at the age of 48.

== Books ==
- Itsumi, Masataka; Itsumi, Harue Gan Saihatsusu (ガン再発す) (Kōsaidō Shuppan, 1994) ISBN 978-4-331-50434-5
