= Yamayoshi Morisuke =

Yamayoshi Morisuke (山吉 盛典, September 1835 - July 3, 1902) served as the governor of Fukushima Prefecture during the Meiji period. He was known in Japanese history as the last person who spoke to Ōkubo Toshimichi prior to the latter's assassination on May 14, 1878.
