= List of governors of Osaka Prefecture =

Governors of Osaka

The governors of Osaka Prefecture have held office since 1868. Following the Meiji Restoration, governors were appointed rather than elected. After the post-war Constitution of Japan came into effect in 1947, governors became democratically elected. Hirofumi Yoshimura has served as governor since 2019.

== Appointed governors (1868–1947) ==
After the Meiji Restoration and the establishment of a modern parliamentary system, governors were appointed rather than democratically elected.The following are the "Imperial" governors of Osaka Prefecture:

- Daigo Tadamasa 1868
- Gotō Shōjirō 1868–1870
- Kimimasa Yuri 1870
- Yotsutsuji Nishi 1870–1872
- Norobu Watanabe 1872–1880
- Tateno Tsuyoshi 1880–1889
- Nishimura Sutezō 1889–1891
- Yamada Nobumichi 1891–1895
- Utsumi Tadakatsu 1895–1897
- Tokito Konkyo 1897–1898
- Mamoru Okimorikata 1898
- Yoshihara Saburo 1898
- Tadashini Kikuchi 1898–1902
- Chikaaki Takasaki 1902–1911
- Marques Okubo Toshi Takeshi 1912–1917
- Harumichi Tanabe 1927–1928
- Yūichirō Chikaraishi 1928–1929
- Saito Munenori 1931–1932
- Shinobu Agata 1932–1935
- Minabe Choji 1941–1943

== Governors after 1947 ==
After the end of the Second World War and the introduction of the post-war Japanese constitution in 1947, governors were democratically elected. The following are the governors of Osaka Prefecture from 1947 to the present:

- Bunzo Akama 1947–1959
- Gisen Sato 1959–1971
- Ryōichi Kuroda 1971–1979
- Sakae Kishi 1979–1991
- Kazuo Nakagawa 1991–1995
- Knock Yokoyama 1995–1999
- Fusae Ohta 2000–2008
- Tōru Hashimoto 2008–2011
- Ichirō Matsui 2011–2019
- Hirofumi Yoshimura 2019–present
