= List of governors of Kumamoto Prefecture =

== Appointed governors ==
- 1876 Yasuoka Ryosuke
- 1876-1891 Takaaki Tomioka
- 1891-1896 Matsudaira Masanao
- 1896-1898 Ōura Kanetake
- 1898-1903 Tokuhisa Tsunenori
- 1903-1907 Egi Kazuyuki
- 1907-1908 Norikichi Oshikawa
- 1908-1912 Kawaji Toshikyo
- 1912 Tadashi Munakata
- 1912-1913 Kamiyama Mitsunoshin
- 1913-1914 Tenta Akaboshi
- 1916-1919 Ōta Masahiro
- 1919-1921 Hikoji Kawaguchi
- 1921-1922 Sansuke Nakayama
- 1922-1923 Tadahiko Okada
- 1923-1924 Chisato Tanaka
- 1924-1925 Nakagawa Kenzō
- 1925-1926 Yoshifumi Satake
- 1926-1927 Masao Oka
- 1927-1929 Saito Munenori
- 1929-1930 Omori Kichigoro
- 1930-1931 Bunpei Motoyama
- 1931-1932 Kenichi Yamashita
- 1932-1935 Keiichi Suzuki (governor of Hiroshima)
- 1935-1936 Sekiya Nobuyuke
- 1936-1939 Fujioka Nagakazu
- 1939-1940 Shunsuke Kondo
- 1940-1942 Yukizawa Chiyoji
- 1942-1944 Hikari Akira
- 1944-1945 Soga Kajimatsu
- 1945-1946 Hirai Fumi
- 1946 Hiroshi Nagai
- 1946-1947 Saburo Sakurai (1st time)

== Elected governors ==
- 1947 Naoto Suzuki
- 1947-1959 Saburo Sakurai (2nd time)
- 1959-1971 Kosaku Teramoto
- 1971-1983 Issei Sawada
- 1983-1991 Morihiro Hosokawa
- 1991-2000 Joji Fukushima
- 2000-2008 Yoshiko Shiotani
- 2008–2024 Ikuo Kabashima
- 2024–present Takashi Kimura
