= List of governors of Miyagi Prefecture =

== Appointed governors ==
- Ryo Shioya 1872-1873
- Tokisuke Miyagi 1873-1878
- Matsudaira Masanao 1878-1891
- Mamoru Funakoshi 1891-1894
- Minoru Katsumata 1894-1897
- Sukeo Kabayama 1897-1898
- Tokito Konkyo 1898
- Ōura Kanetake 1898
- Kiyoshi Shin 1898-1900
- Chikaaki Takasaki 1900
- Nomura Masaaki 1900
- Motohiro Onoda 1900-1902
- Tadashi Munakata 1902-1903
- Terumi Tanabe 1903-1905
- Kamei Ezaburo 1905-1908
- Terada Yushi 1908-1913
- Mori Masataka 1913-1914
- Magoichi Tahara 1914-1915
- Tsunenosuke Hamada 1915-1919
- Mori Masataka (2nd time) 1919-1921
- Yūichirō Chikaraishi 1921-1924
- Manbei Ueda 1924-1926
- Katorataro Ushizu 1926-1929
- Michio Yuzawa 1929-1931
- Minabe Choji 1931-1933
- Asaji Akagi 1933-1934
- Kiyoshi Nakarai 1934-1935
- Jiro Ino 1935-1936
- Yoshio Kikuyama 1936-1939
- Kyuichiro Totsuka 1939
- Ryosaku Shimizu 1939-1940
- Nobuo Hayashin 1940-1942
- Otomaru Kato 1942-1943
- Nobuya Uchida 1943-1944
- Tsurukichi Maruyama 1944-1945
- Motome Ikezumi 1945
- Saburo Chiba 1945-1947

== Elected governors ==
- Jiro Kazuo Watanabe 1947
- Saburo Chiba (2nd time) 1947-1949
- Kazuji Sasaki 1949-1952
- Otogoro Miyagi 1952-1956
- Yasushi Onuma 1956-1959
- Yoshio Miura 1959-1965
- Shintaro Takahashi 1965-1969
- Soichiro Yamamoto 1969-1989
- Shuntara Honma 1989-1993
- Shirō Asano (politician) 1993-2005
- Yoshihiro Murai 2005–present
