= List of governors of Niigata Prefecture =

This list of governors of Niigata Prefecture provides a chronological list of the governors of Niigata Prefecture.

== List of governors ==
- Tokiatsu Hirimatsu 1871-1872
- Masataka Kusumoto 1872–1875
- Moriki Nagayama 1875-1885
- Shinozaki Goro 1885-1889
- Sadaaki Senda 1889–1891
- Koteda Yasuda 1891-1896
- Asada Tokunori 1896–1897
- Minoru Katsumata 1897-1900
- Shin Kiyoshi 1900
- Fumi Kashiwada 1900-1903
- Hiroshi Abe 1903-1907
- Kiyoshi Honba 1907-1912
- Mori Masataka 1912
- Izawa Takio 1912-1913
- Ando Kensuke 1913-1914
- Keisuke Sakanaka 1914-1916
- Tsuizui Katagawa 1916-1917
- Watanabe Katsusaburo 1917-1919
- Ōta Masahiro 1919–1923
- Ohara Sanarata 1923-1925
- Takeo Mimatsu 1925-1927
- Shohei Fujinoma 1927-1928
- Yuichiro Chikaraishi 1928
- Ozaki Yujiro 1928-1929
- Takeo Mimatsu (2nd time) 1929-1930
- Shinya Kurosaki 1930-1931
- Nakano Kunikazu 1931
- Obata Toyoji 1931-1932
- Ryo Chiba 1932-1935
- Miyawaki Umekichi 1935-1936
- Sekiya Nobuyuki 1936-1938
- Yasujiro Nakamura 1938-1939
- Seikichi Kimishima 1939-1940
- Seiichiro Yasui 1940-1941
- Doi Shohei 1941-1943
- Tamon Maeda 1943–1945
- Kingo Machimura 1945
- Masafuku Hatada 1945–1946
- Sato Dodai 1946
- Hideo Aoki 1946-1947
- Shohei Okada 1947-1955
- Kazuo Kitamura 1955-1961
- Juichiro Tsukada 1961-1966
- Shiro Watari 1966-1974
- Takeo Kimi 1974-1989
- Kiyoshi Kaneko 1989-1992
- Ikuo Hirayama 1992–2004
- Hirohiko Izumida 2004–2016
- Ryuichi Yoneyama 2016–2018
- Hideyo Hanazumi 2018-
