= List of governors of Saitama Prefecture =

== Appointed governors ==
- Morihide Nomura 1871-1873
- Tasuke Shirane 1873-1882
- Kiyohide Yoshida 1882-1889
- Eitaro Komatsubara 1889-1891
- Kanichi Kubota 1891-1892
- Tsunao Hayashi 1892-1894
- Tomi Senketaka 1894-1897
- Tadashi Munakata 1897–1898
- Ogimachi Sanemasa 1899–1900
- Yamada Shunzō 1900–1902
- Shuichi Kinoshita 1902–1905
- Marquis Okubo Toshi Takeshi 1905–1907
- Shimada Gotaro 1907–1913
- Soeda Keiichiro 1913–1914
- Akira Sakaya 1914–1916
- Tadahiko Okada 1916–1919
- Horiuchi Hidetaro 1919–1923
- Motoda Tashio 1923–1924
- Saito Morikuni 1924–1927
- Yashu 1927
- Miyawaki Umekichi (1st time) 1927–1929
- Shirane Takekai 1929
- Hosokawa Chohei 1929–1930
- Niwa Shichiro 1930–1931
- Kozo Yamanaka 1931
- Miyawaki Umekichi (2nd time) 1931–1932
- Shigezo Fukushima 1932–1933
- Hirose Hisatada 1933–1934
- Ichisho Inuma 1934–1935
- Saito Juri 1935–1936
- Jitsuzo Kawanishi 1936–1938
- Toki Ginjiro 1938–1941
- Miyano Shozo 1941–1942
- Toshio Otsu 1942–1943
- Sudo Tetsushin 1943-1944
- Ryuichi Fukumoto 1944-1945
- Sekigaiyo Otoko 1945-1946
- Jitzuzo Nishimura (1st time) 1946-1947

== Elected governors ==
- Hitoshi Miyawaki 1947
- Jitzuzo Nishimura (2nd time) 1947-1949
- Yoshida Tadakazu 1949 (acting)
- Yuuichi Oosawa 1949-1956
- Hiroshi Kurihara 1956-1972
- Yawara Hata 1972–1992
- Yoshihiko Tsuchiya 1992-2003
- Nobuyuki Aoki (acting) 2003
- Kiyoshi Ueda 2003–2019
- Motohiro Ōno 2019-present
