= List of governors of Ibaraki Prefecture =

The following is a list of governors of Ibaraki Prefecture.

The first governor of Ibaraki Prefecture was appointed by the Meiji government on July 13, 1871. Governors of Ibaraki were politically appointed from 1871 until the post-war period starting in 1945, after which they were popularly elected.

== Appointed governors ==
- Yamaoka Tesshū 1871
- Yamaguchi Tadasada 1872
- Nomura Motosuke 1872
- Toru Watanabe 1872-1873
- Seki Shinpei 1873-1875
- Nakayama Nobuyasu 1875-1877
- Tatsutaro Nomura 1877-1880
- Hitomi Katsutaro 1880-1885
- Shima Isei 1885-1886
- Sadanori Yasuda 1886-1891
- Shoichiro Ishii 1891-1892
- Nobuaki Makino 1892-1893
- Chikaaki Takasaki 1893-1896
- Egi Kazuyuki 1896-1897
- Motohiro Onoda 1897-1898
- Kiyoshi Honba 1898-1899
- Fumi Kashiwada 1899-1900
- Kono Chuzo 1900-1903
- Teru Terahara 1903-1906
- Ōtsuka Mitsugu 1906-1907
- Mori Masataka 1907-1908
- Keisuke Sakanaka 1912-1917
- Yūichirō Chikaraishi 1917-1921
- Genjiro Moriya 1921-1923
- Shohei Fujinuma 1923-1924
- Tsugino Daisaburo 1924-1925
- Kaiichiro Suematsu 1925-1926
- Kihachiro Ito 1926-1927
- Nakayama Sanosuke 1927
- Jiro Morioka 1927-1929
- Shozo Ushijima 1929-1931
- Tanaka Bujio 1931
- Seikichi Kimishima 1931-1932
- Abe Kashichi 1932-1935
- Ando Kyoushirou 1935-1937
- Nobuo Hayashi 1937-1938
- Shigeru Hamaza 1938-1939
- Tokitsugi Yoshinaga 1939-1941
- Kanichi Naito 1941-1942
- Tsujiyama Jihei 1942-1943
- Sieve Yoshimi 1943-1944
- Hisashi Imai 1944-1945
- Masami Hashimoto 1945

== Elected governors ==
- Yōji Tomosue 1945-1959
- Nirō Iwakami 1959-1975
- Fujio Takeuchi 1975-1993
- Masaru Hashimoto 1993-2017
- Kazuhiko Ōigawa 2017-
