= 1651 =

1651 in various calendars
- Gregorian calendar: 1651; MDCLI
- Ab urbe condita: 2404
- Armenian calendar: 1100; ԹՎ ՌՃ
- Assyrian calendar: 6401
- Balinese saka calendar: 1572–1573
- Bengali calendar: 1057–1058
- Berber calendar: 2601
- English Regnal year: 2 Cha. 2 – 3 Cha. 2 (Interregnum)
- Buddhist calendar: 2195
- Burmese calendar: 1013
- Byzantine calendar: 7159–7160
- Chinese calendar: 庚寅年 (Metal Tiger); 4348 or 4141 — to — 辛卯年 (Metal Rabbit); 4349 or 4142
- Coptic calendar: 1367–1368
- Discordian calendar: 2817
- Ethiopian calendar: 1643–1644
- Hebrew calendar: 5411–5412
- Hindu calendars
- Vikram Samvat: 1707–1708
- Shaka Samvat: 1572–1573
- Kali Yuga: 4751–4752
- Holocene calendar: 11651
- Igbo calendar: 651–652
- Iranian calendar: 1029–1030
- Islamic calendar: 1061–1062
- Japanese calendar: Keian 4 (慶安４年)
- Javanese calendar: 1572–1573
- Julian calendar: Gregorian minus 10 days
- Korean calendar: 3984
- Minguo calendar: 261 before ROC 民前261年
- Nanakshahi calendar: 183
- Thai solar calendar: 2193–2194
- Tibetan calendar: ལྕགས་ཕོ་སྟག་ལོ་ (male Iron-Tiger); 1777 or 1396 or 624 — to — ལྕགས་མོ་ཡོས་ལོ་ (female Iron-Hare); 1778 or 1397 or 625

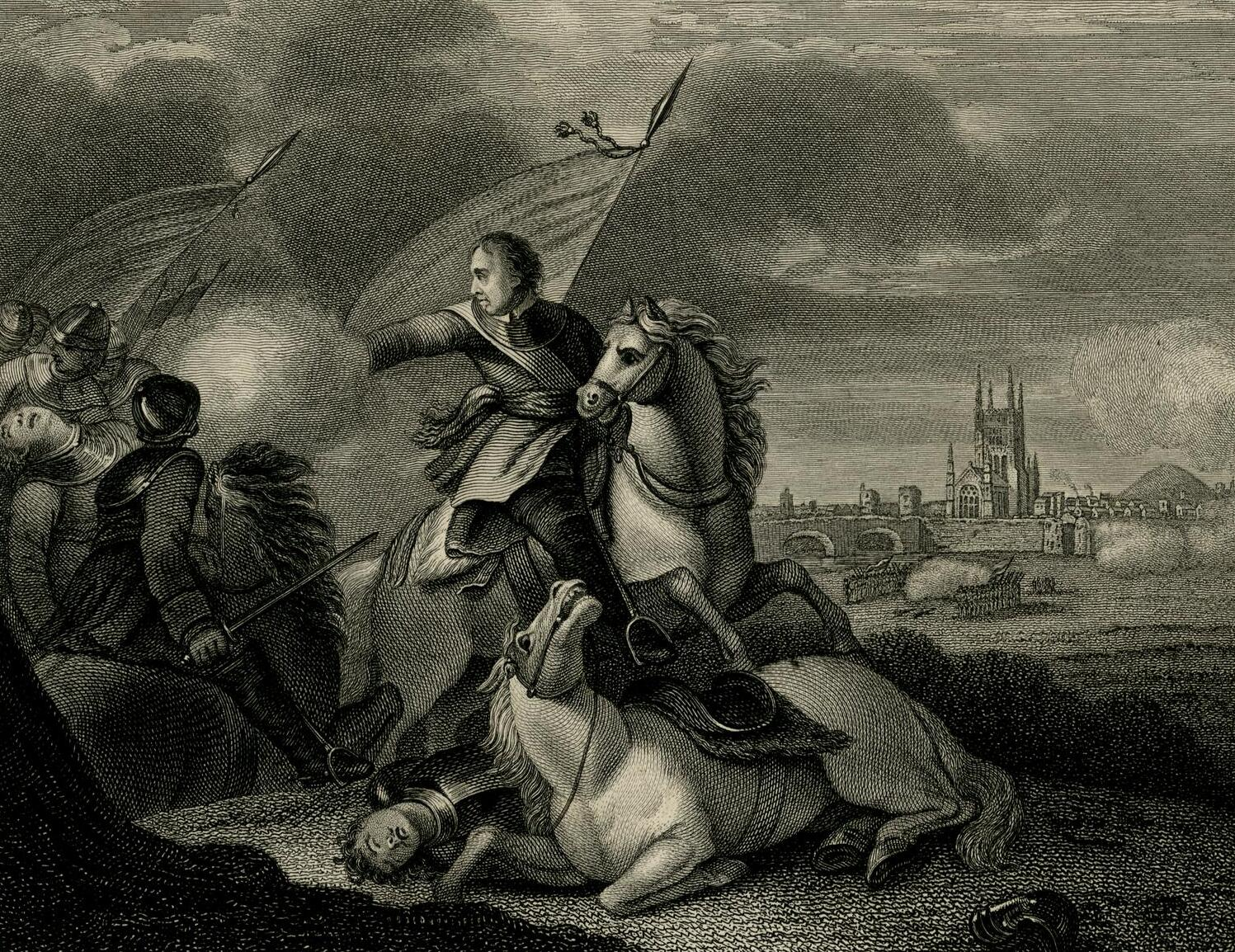
September 3: Charles II of Scotland is defeated at the Battle of Worcester, the last battle of the English Civil War.

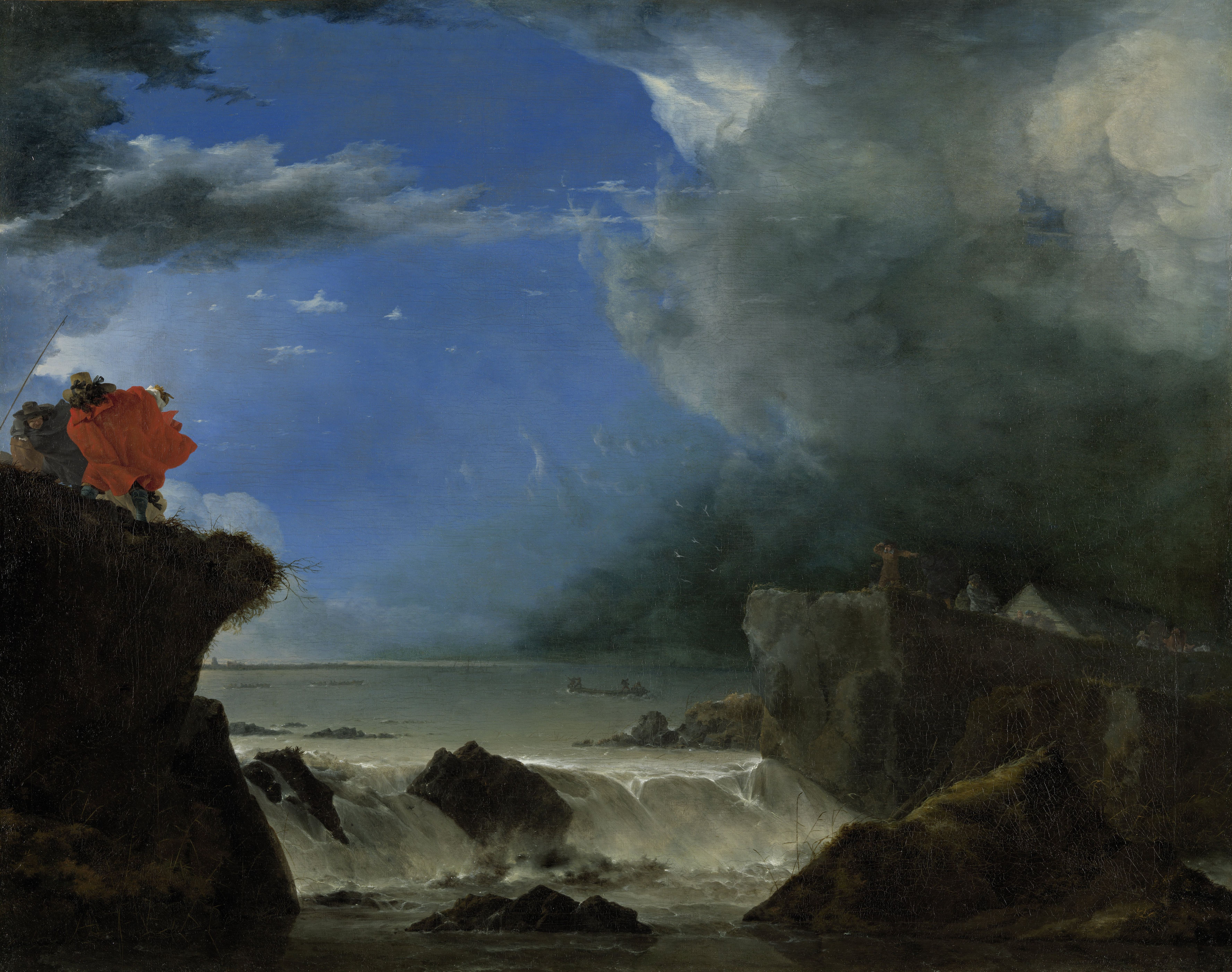
March 4: St. Peter's Flood breaches the dikes of Amsterdam

1651 (MDCLI) was a common year starting on Sunday of the Gregorian calendar and a common year starting on Wednesday of the Julian calendar, the 1651st year of the Common Era (CE) and Anno Domini (AD) designations, the 651st year of the 2nd millennium, the 51st year of the 17th century, and the 2nd year of the 1650s decade. As of the start of 1651, the Gregorian calendar was 10 days ahead of the Julian calendar, which remained in localized use until 1923.

== Events ==
=== January–March ===
- January 1 – Charles II is crowned King of Scots at Scone (his first crowning).
- January 24 – Parliament of Boroa in Chile: Spanish and Mapuche authorities meet at Boroa, renewing the fragile peace established at the parliaments of Quillín, in 1641 and 1647.
- February 22 – St. Peter's Flood: A first storm tide in the North Sea strikes the coast of Germany, drowning thousands. The island of Juist is split in half, and the western half of Buise is probably washed away.
- March 4 – St. Peter's Flood: Another storm tide in the North Sea strikes the Netherlands, flooding Amsterdam.
- March 6 – The town of Kajaani is founded by Count Per Brahe the Younger.
- March 15 – Prince Aisin Gioro Fulin attains the age of 13 and becomes the Shunzhi Emperor of China, which had been governed by a regency since the death of his father Hong Taiji in 1643.
- March 26 – The Spanish ship San José, loaded with silver, is pushed south by strong winds; it wrecks on the coast of southern Chile, and its surviving crew is killed by indigenous Cuncos.

=== April–June ===
- April 7 – Shunzhi, Emperor of China, announces in an imperial edict that he will purge corruption from government.
- April 25 – Thomas Hobbes publishes his magnum opus, the political tract Leviathan, in England.
- May 12 – General Marcin Kalinowski of Poland wins the Battle of Kopychyntsi against Zaporozhian Cossacks forces under the command of Asand Demka during the Khmelnytsky Uprising in what is now Ukraine.
- May 21 – The Sovereign Military Order of Malta purchases the Caribbean islands of Saint Barthélemy, Saint Christopher, Saint Croix and Saint Martin from the France's Compagnie des Îles de l'Amérique. The Order will sell the islands in 1665 to the French West India Company.
- June 17 – Franco-Spanish War (1635–1659); A squadron of Spanish galleys under John Joseph of Austria capture the French galleon Lion Couronné off Formentera, Balearic Islands, Spain.
- June 30 – After three days of fighting in the Battle of Berestechko in Ukraine, one of the biggest land battles of the 17th century, with some 205,000 troops in the field, the Polish–Lithuanian Commonwealth Army defeats the Zaporozhian Cossacks.

=== July–September ===
- July 20 – At the Battle of Inverkeithing in Scotland, the English Parliamentarian New Model Army, under Major-General John Lambert, defeats a Scottish Covenanter army acting on behalf of Charles II, led by Sir John Brown of Fordell.
- August 13 – The troops of King Charles II of Scotland force the retreat of English Commonwealth troops at the Battle of Warrington Bridge, the last victory of Scotland over England in battle.
- August 28
  - The "Onfall of Alyth takes place in the Scottish town of the same name when most of the members of Scotland's governing body, the Committee of States, are betrayed to English invaders. The Earl of Leven, the Earl of Crawford, the Earl Marischal, Lord Nairne and other prominent people are captured and imprisoned in the Tower of London.
  - The Battle of Upton is fought at Upton-upon-Severn in England, where Scottish invaders commanded by Major General Edward Massey are defeated by the English Parliamentarians led by John Lambert. The retreat of the Scots clears the way for the successful English attack at Worcester.
- September 1 – The siege of Dundee ends with the English Parliamentarian army, under General Monck, decisively defeating Covenanters in the last battle of the Wars of the Three Kingdoms in Scotland.
- September 2 – Kösem Sultan is assassinated by her daughter-in-law, Turhan Sultan.
- September 3 – Charles II of England is defeated in the Battle of Worcester, the last major battle of the English Civil War, and forced to flee.

=== October–December ===
- October 14 – Laws are passed in Massachusetts, forbidding poor people from adopting excessive styles of dress.
- October 16 – Prince Charles of the House of Stuart escapes from England to find refuge in France.
- October – An English diplomatic team, headed by Oliver St John, goes to The Hague to negotiate an alliance between the Commonwealth of England and the Dutch Republic.
- November 3 – The Manx Rebellion of 1651 comes to an end as the Countess of Derby surrenders the Isle of Man to the forces of Oliver Cromwell in return for a guarantee of safe passage for herself, her family and her servants, off of the island.
- November 24 – In China, Qing dynasty forces led by Shang Kexi capture the city of Guangzhou from the Southern Ming and then carry out a massacre of the population, killing as many as 70,000 people over 11 days ending on December 5.
- December 17 – Castle Cornet in Guernsey, the last stronghold which had supported the King in the Third English Civil War, surrenders.

=== Date unknown ===
- The Keian Uprising fails in Japan.
- The first coffee house in England is opened in Oxford, indicative of their increasing popularity in Europe.
- The Madanmohan-jiu Temple is built at Samta (India), a village in the Howrah district of West Bengal.

== Births ==
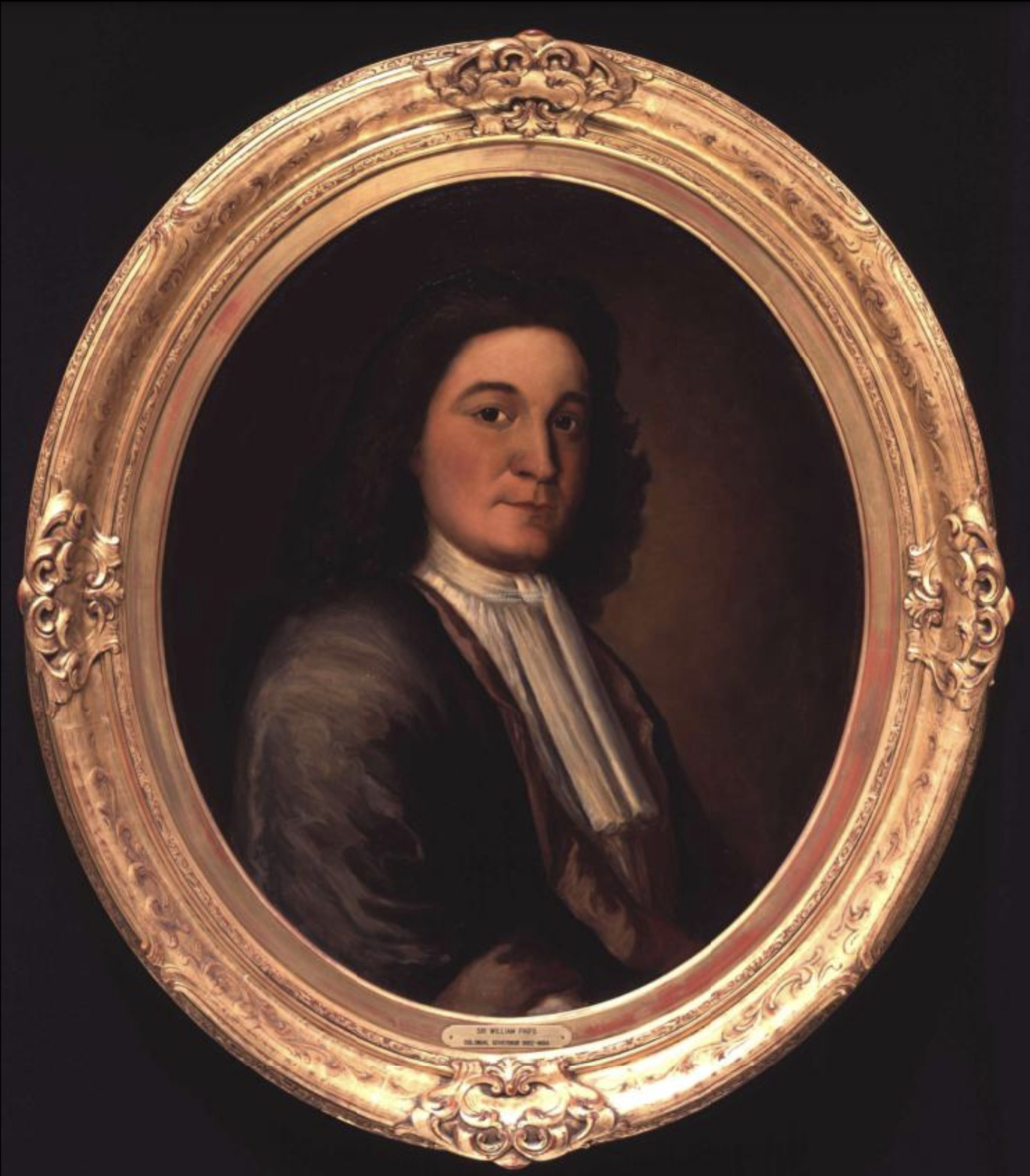
William Phips

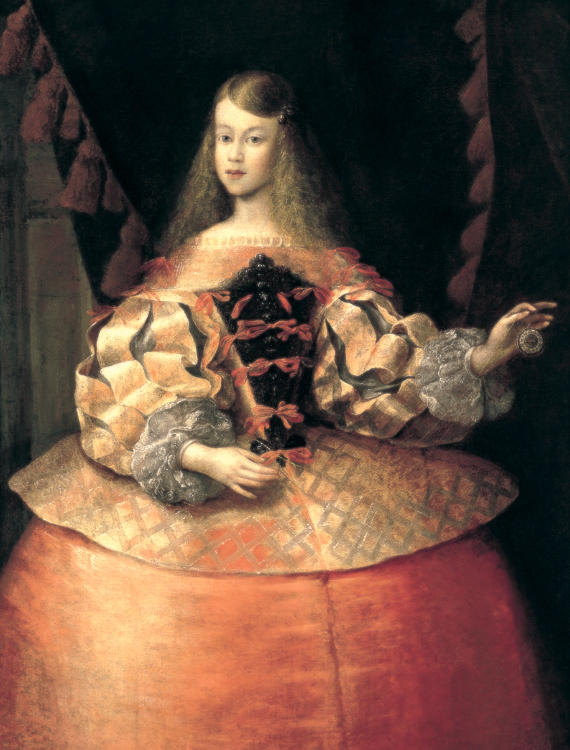
Margaret Theresa of Spain

- January 9 – Petronio Franceschini, Italian Baroque composer (d. 1680)
- January 18 – William Coddington, Jr., Rhode Island colonial governor (d. 1689)
- January 19 – Johannes Wolfgang von Bodman, German bishop (d. 1691)
- January 20 – Edward Tyson, British scientist (d. 1708)
- February 2 or 1950 – William Phips, first royal governor of the Province of Massachusetts Bay (d. 1695)
- February 9 – Procopio Cutò, French entrepreneur (d. 1727)
- February 11 – Sir Ralph Assheton, 2nd Baronet, of Middleton, English politician (d. 1716)
- February 11 – Anne Scott, 1st Duchess of Buccleuch, wealthy Scottish peeress (d. 1732)
- February 21 – Silvius II Frederick, Duke of Württemberg-Oels (d. 1697)
- February 25 – Quirinus Kuhlmann, German Baroque poet and mystic (d. 1689)
- February 26 – Pieter van der Hulst, Dutch painter (d. 1727)
- March 2 – Carlo Gimach, Maltese architect, engineer and poet (d. 1730)
- March 4 – John Somers, 1st Baron Somers, Lord Chancellor of England (d. 1716)
- March 31 – Karl II, Elector Palatine of Germany (d. 1685)
- April 2 – Fabrizio Paolucci, Italian Catholic cardinal (d. 1726)
- April 6 – André Dacier, French classical scholar (d. 1722)
- April 10 – Ehrenfried Walther von Tschirnhaus, German mathematician (d. 1708)
- April 17 – Giuseppe Archinto, Italian cardinal, Archbishop of Milan (d. 1712)
- April 21 – Blessed Joseph Vaz, Apostle of Ceylon (d. 1711)
- April 30 – Jean-Baptiste de la Salle, French educational reformer (d. 1719)
- May 17 – Jacques Gravier, French Jesuit missionary in the New World (d. 1708)
- May 27 – Louis-Antoine, Cardinal de Noailles, French bishop (d. 1729)
- June 6 – Willem van Ingen, Dutch painter (d. 1708)
- June 10 – Alexander Edward, Scottish landscape architect (d. 1708)
- June 16 – Francisco Cuervo y Valdés, Spanish colonial governor (d. 1714)
- June 21 – William VII, Landgrave of Hesse-Kassel (d. 1670)
- July 4 – Honoratus a Sancta Maria, French Discalced Carmelite (d. 1729)
- July 12 – Margaret Theresa of Spain (d. 1673)
- July 22 – Ferdinand Tobias Richter, Austrian Baroque composer (d. 1711)
- July 26 – Jacques Bigot (Jesuit), French Jesuit priest, missionary to the Abenakis in Canada (d. 1711)
- August 6 – François Fénelon, Archbishop of Cambrai, France (d. 1715)
- August 6 – Carl Gustav Rehnskiöld, Swedish Field Marshal (d. 1722)
- August 13 – Balthasar Permoser, German sculptor (d. 1732)
- August 25 – François Baert, Jesuit hagiographer (d. 1719)
- September 1 – Nataliya Kyrillovna Naryshkina, Tsaritsa of Russia (d. 1694)
- September 2 – Zubdat-un-Nissa, Mughal princess, daughter of Emperor Aurangzeb (d. 1707)
- September 5 – William Dampier, English explorer (d. 1715)
- September 6 – Aoyama Tadao, Japanese daimyō (d. 1685)
- September 16 – Engelbert Kaempfer, German physician and traveler (d. 1716)
- September 26 – Francis Daniel Pastorius, German founder of Germantown, Pennsylvania (d. 1720)
- October 24 – Jean de La Chapelle, French writer and dramatist (d. 1723)
- October 26 – Perizonius, Dutch linguist (d. 1715)
- November 1 – Jean-Baptiste Colbert, Marquis de Seignelay, French politician (d. 1690)
- November 12 – Juana Inés de la Cruz, Mexican nun, writer and poet (d. 1695)
- December 25 – Pedro Manuel Colón de Portugal (d. 1710)
- December 28 – Johann Krieger, German composer and organist (d. 1735)
- date unknown – Gorgin Khan, Persian Governor of Kandahar (d. 1709)

== Deaths ==
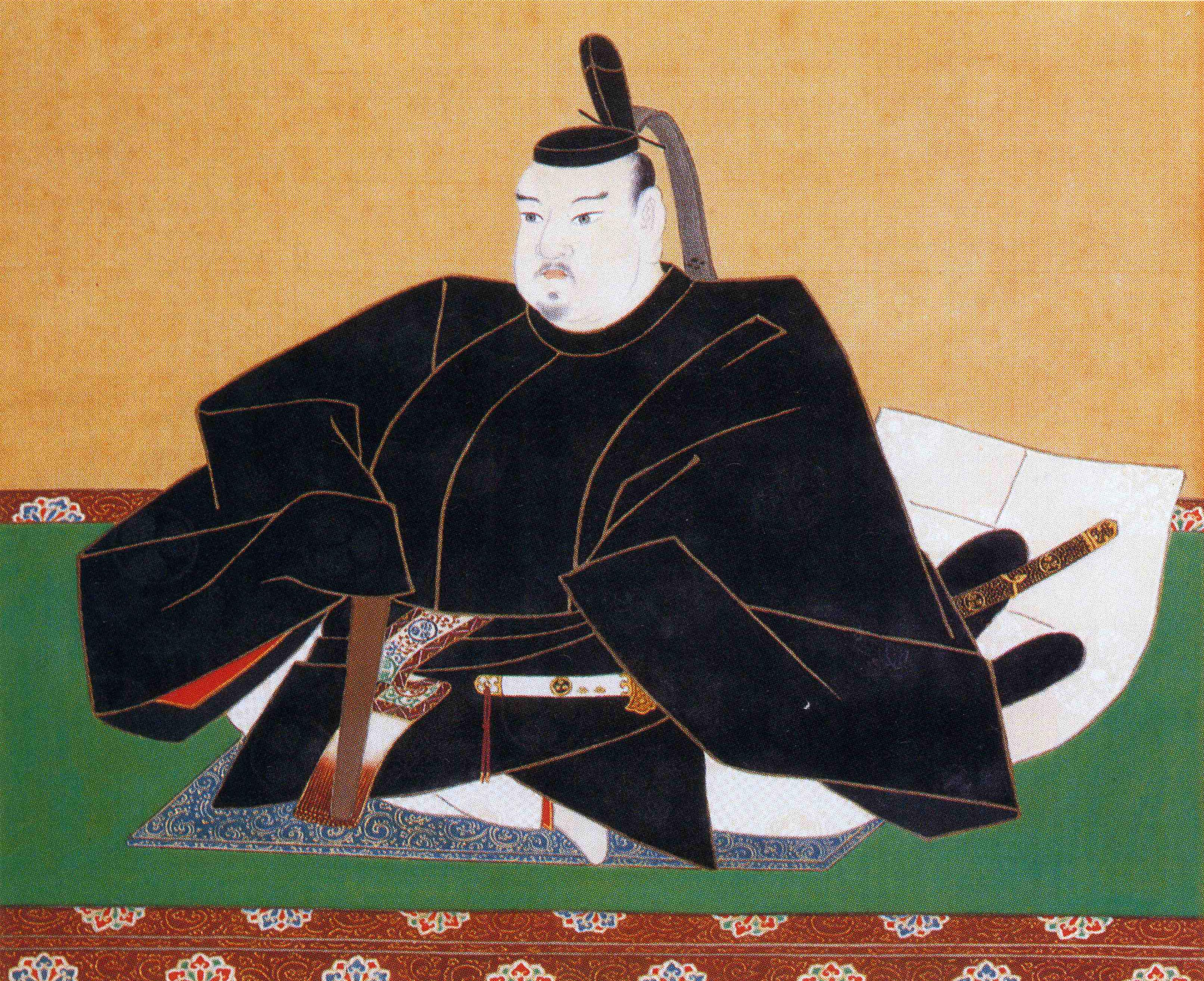
Tokugawa Iemitsu

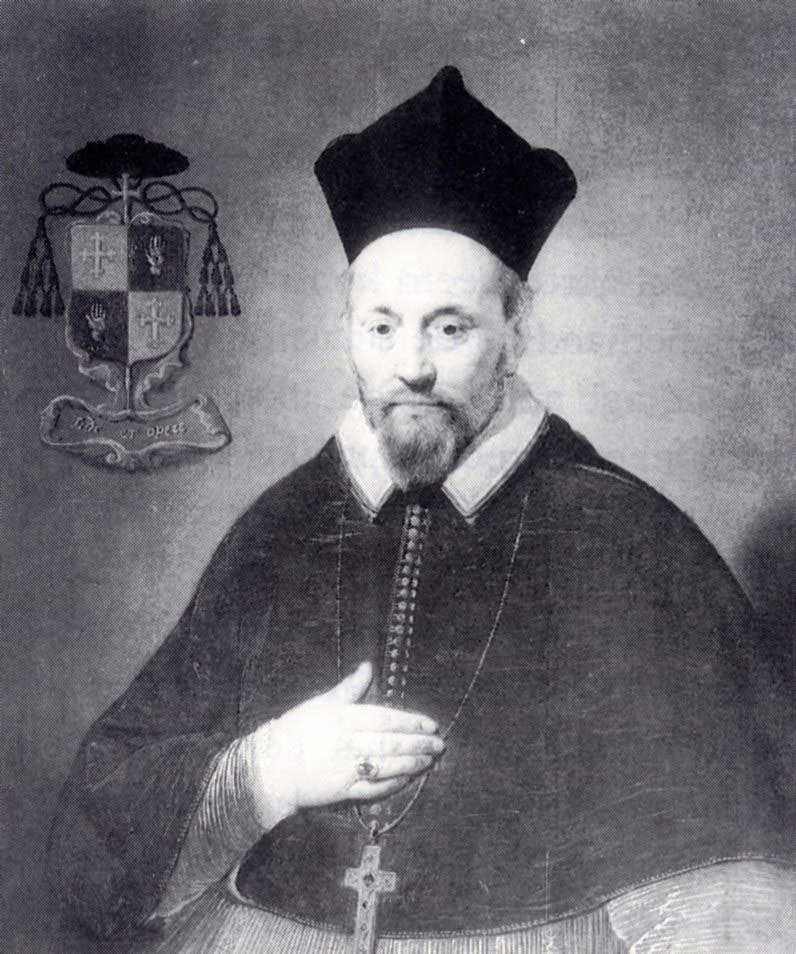
Philippus Rovenius

- January – Thomas Greene, Colonial governor of Maryland (b. 1609)
- January 22 – Johannes Phocylides Holwarda, Dutch astronomer (b. 1618)
- January 29 – Diego de Colmenares, Spanish historian (b. 1586)
- February 6 – Erdmann August of Brandenburg-Bayreuth, Hereditary Margrave (b. 1615)
- February 8 – Richard Newport, 1st Baron Newport, English politician (b. 1587)
- February 9 – Herman Krefting, Norwegian businessman (b. 1592)
- March 11 – Alvise Contarini, Italian diplomat, nobleman (b. 1597)
- April 1 – John of Hesse-Braubach, German general (b. 1609)
- April 7 – Lennart Torstensson, Swedish Field Marshal, Privy Councillour and Governor-General (b. 1603)
- April 10 – Sir William Airmine, 1st Baronet, English politician (b. 1593)
- May 16 – Sophie of Solms-Laubach, wife of Joachim Ernst, Margrave of Brandenburg-Ansbach (b. 1594)
- May 26 – Jeane Gardiner, British woman executed for witchcraft in Bermuda
- May 28 – Henry Grey, 10th Earl of Kent (b. 1594)
- June 8 – Tokugawa Iemitsu, Japanese shōgun (b. 1604)
- June 17
  - Roger North, English politician (b. 1577)
  - Francesco Piccolomini, Italian Jesuit (b. 1582)
- July 7 – Dina Vinhofvers, Danish alleged conspirator (b. 1620)
- August 1 – Maria Anna Vasa, Polish princess (b. 1650)
- August 2 – Ercole, Marquis of Baux, member of the House of Grimaldi (b. 1623)
- August 8 – Countess Amalie Elisabeth of Hanau-Münzenberg, regent of Hesse-Kassel (b. 1602)
- August 16 – Filippo Benedetto de Sio, Italian Catholic prelate and bishop (b. 1585)
- August 20 – Jeremi Wiśniowiecki, Polish nobleman (b. 1612)
- September 2
  - Kösem Sultan, regent of the Ottoman Empire (b. 1590)
  - William Widdrington, 1st Baron Widdrington, English landowner, politician (b. 1610)
- September 10 – Yui Shōsetsu, Japanese rebel (b. 1605)
- September 12
  - Félix Castello, Spanish artist (b. 1595)
  - William Hamilton, 2nd Duke of Hamilton, Scottish nobleman (b. 1616)
- September 18 – Henriette Marie of the Palatinate, German noble (b. 1626)
- September 24
  - Étienne Pascal, French mathematician (b. 1588)
  - Marubashi Chūya, Japanese rebel
- September 27 – Maximilian I, Elector of Bavaria (b. 1573)
- October 4 – Ludwig Camerarius, German politician (b. 1573)
- October 6 – Heinrich Albert, German composer and poet (b. 1604)
- October 7 – Jacques Sirmond, French Jesuit scholar (b. 1559)
- October 8
  - Isaac Elzevir, Dutch printer and publisher (b. 1596)
  - Anna Catherine Constance Vasa, Polish princess, daughter of King Sigismund III Vasa (b. 1619)
- October 10 – Philippus Rovenius, Dutch priest (b. 1573)
- October 15 – James Stanley, 7th Earl of Derby (b. 1607)
- October 25 – Saint Job of Pochayiv, Ukrainian Orthodox Christian saint (b. 1551)
- November 20 – Mikołaj Potocki, Polish soldier (b. 1595)
- November 22 – Francis Scott, 2nd Earl of Buccleuch, son of Walter Scott (b. 1626)
- November 26 – Henry Ireton, English Civil War leader (b. 1611)
- December 14 – Pierre Dupuy, French scholar (b. 1582)
- December 15 – Virginia Centurione Bracelli, Italian saint (b. 1587)
- November 18 – Anna Amalia of Baden-Durlach, Regent of Nassau-Saarbrücken (b. 1595)
- December 18 – William Brabazon, 1st Earl of Meath (b. 1580)
- date unknown
  - Eva Bacharach, Bohemian Hebraist (b. 1580)
  - Giulia Tofana, Italian poisoner (b. 1581)
  - Angélique Paulet, French salonnière, singer, musician and actress (b. 1592)
  - Helena Czaplińska, Ukrainian Hetmana
