= 1648 =

1648 in various calendars
- Gregorian calendar: 1648; MDCXLVIII
- Ab urbe condita: 2401
- Armenian calendar: 1097; ԹՎ ՌՂԷ
- Assyrian calendar: 6398
- Balinese saka calendar: 1569–1570
- Bengali calendar: 1054–1055
- Berber calendar: 2598
- English Regnal year: 23 Cha. 1 – 24 Cha. 1
- Buddhist calendar: 2192
- Burmese calendar: 1010
- Byzantine calendar: 7156–7157
- Chinese calendar: 丁亥年 (Fire Pig); 4345 or 4138 — to — 戊子年 (Earth Rat); 4346 or 4139
- Coptic calendar: 1364–1365
- Discordian calendar: 2814
- Ethiopian calendar: 1640–1641
- Hebrew calendar: 5408–5409
- Hindu calendars
- Vikram Samvat: 1704–1705
- Shaka Samvat: 1569–1570
- Kali Yuga: 4748–4749
- Holocene calendar: 11648
- Igbo calendar: 648–649
- Iranian calendar: 1026–1027
- Islamic calendar: 1057–1058
- Japanese calendar: Shōhō 5 / Keian 1 (慶安元年)
- Javanese calendar: 1569–1570
- Julian calendar: Gregorian minus 10 days
- Korean calendar: 3981
- Minguo calendar: 264 before ROC 民前264年
- Nanakshahi calendar: 180
- Thai solar calendar: 2190–2191
- Tibetan calendar: མེ་མོ་ཕག་ལོ་ (female Fire-Boar); 1774 or 1393 or 621 — to — ས་ཕོ་བྱི་བ་ལོ་ (male Earth-Rat); 1775 or 1394 or 622

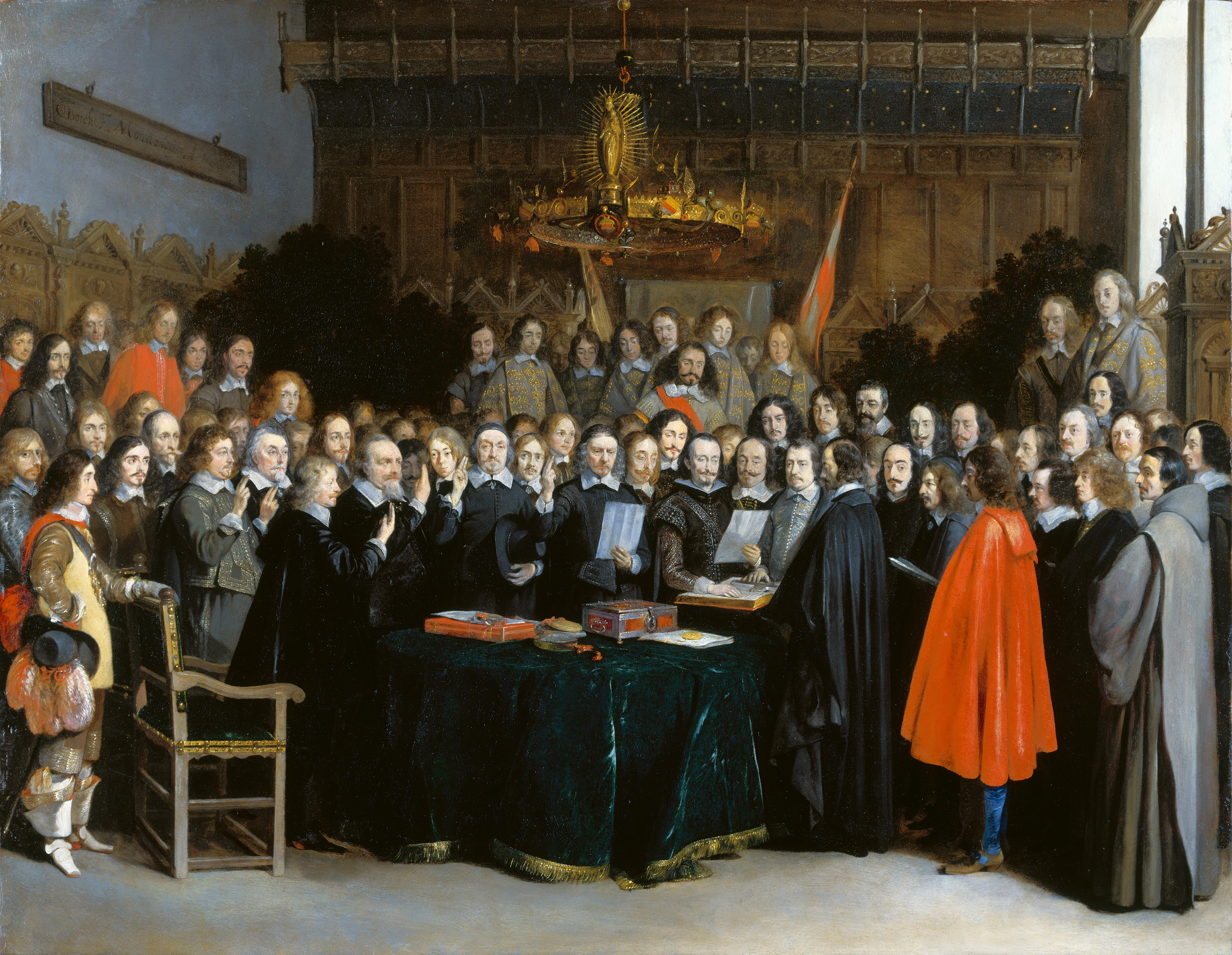
October 24: The Peace of Westphalia is signed, ending the Thirty Years' War.

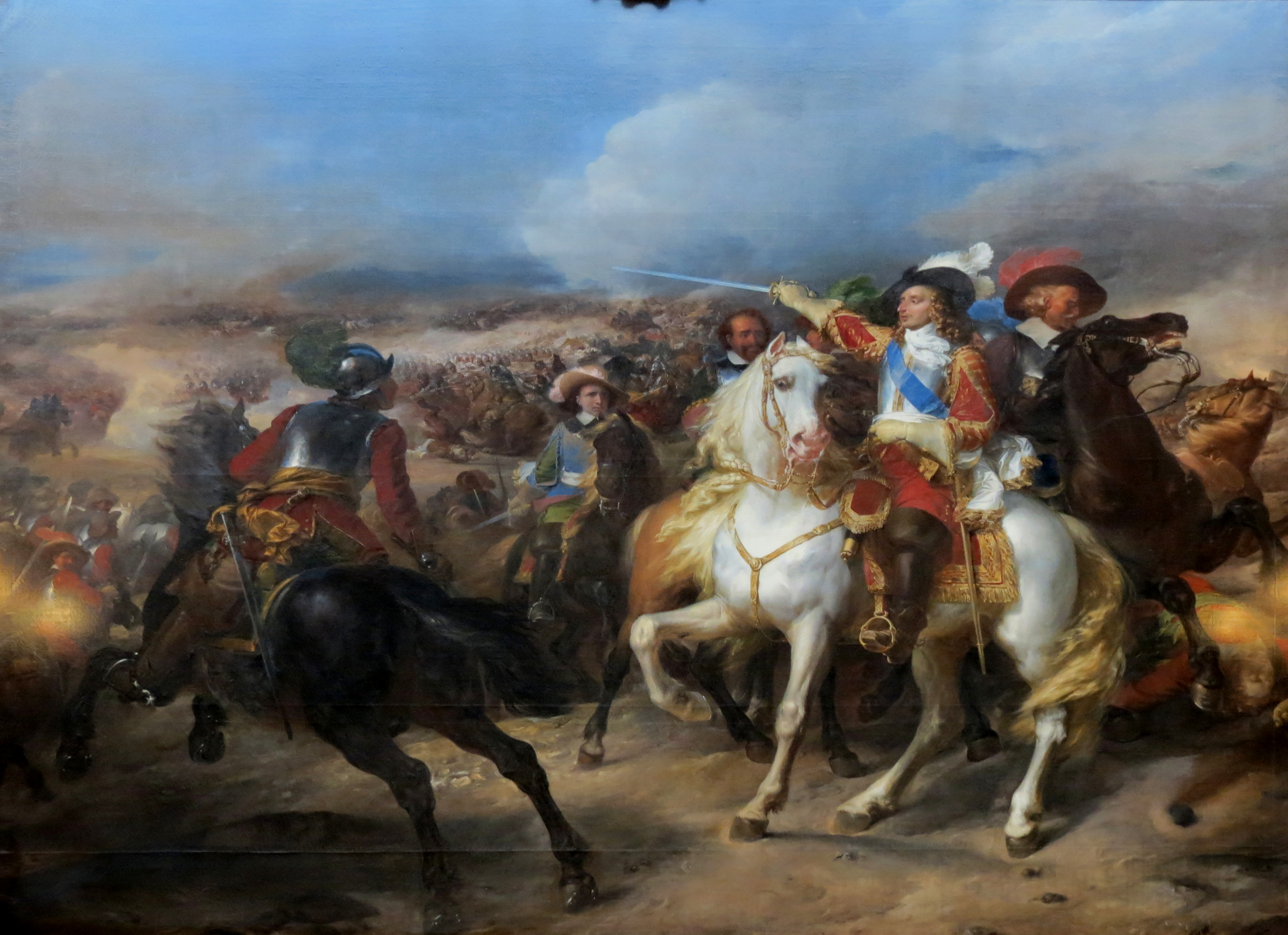
August 20: The French Army defeats the Spanish Army at the Battle of Lens

1648 (MDCXLVIII) was a leap year starting on Wednesday of the Gregorian calendar and a leap year starting on Saturday of the Julian calendar, the 1648th year of the Common Era (CE) and Anno Domini (AD) designations, the 648th year of the 2nd millennium, the 48th year of the 17th century, and the 9th year of the 1640s decade. As of the start of 1648, the Gregorian calendar was 10 days ahead of the Julian calendar, which remained in localized use until 1923.

The year 1648 has been suggested as possibly the last time in which the overall human population declined, coming towards the end of a broader period of global instability which included the collapse of the Ming dynasty and the Thirty Years' War, the latter of which ending in 1648 with the Peace of Westphalia.

== Events ==
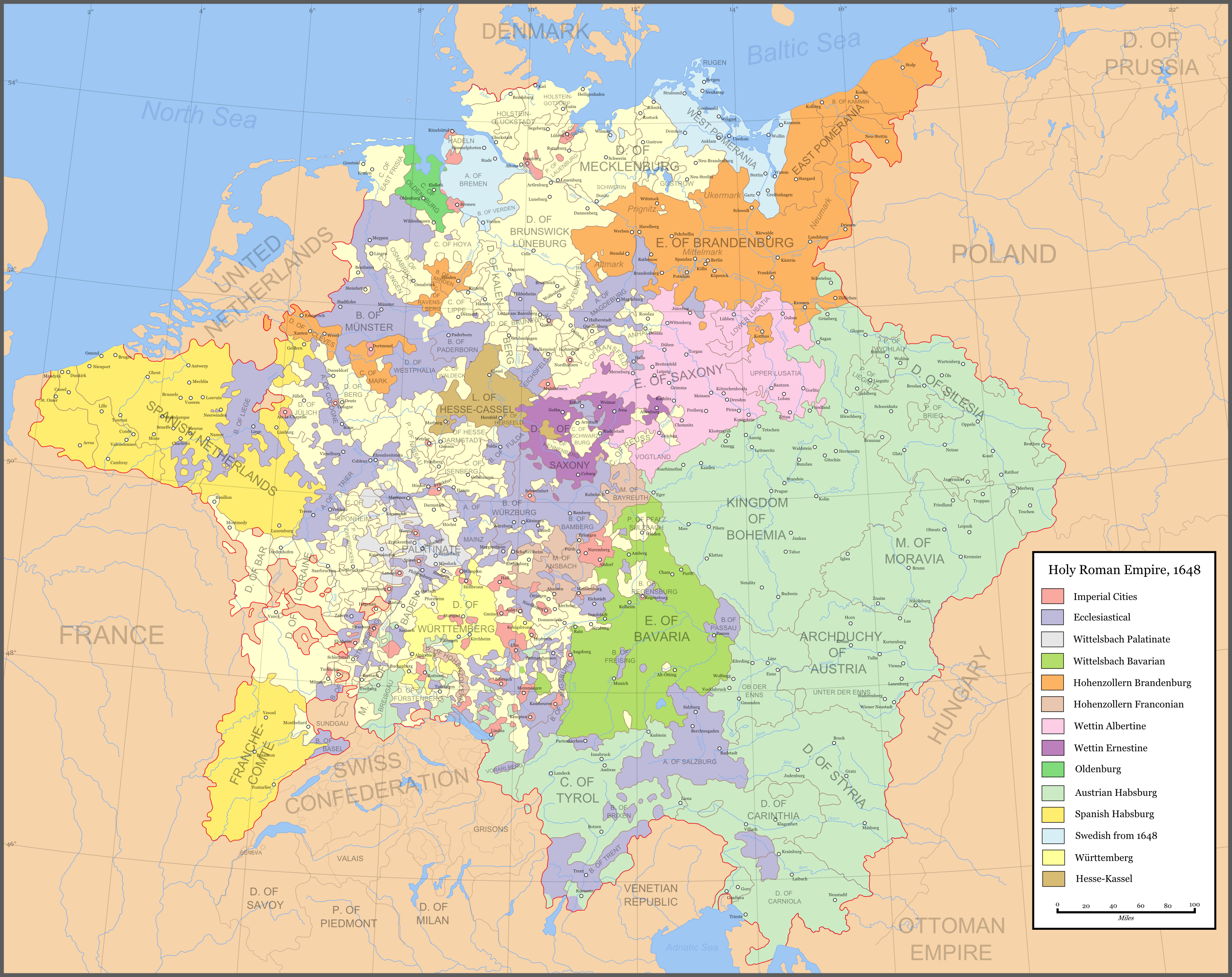
The Holy Roman Empire in 1648

=== January–March ===
- January 15
  - Manchu invaders of China's Fujian province capture Spanish Dominican priest Francisco Fernández de Capillas, torture him and then behead him. Capillas will be canonized more than 350 years later in 2000 in the Roman Catholic Church as one of the Martyr Saints of China.
  - Alexis, Tsar of Russia, marries Maria Miloslavskaya, who later gives birth to two future tsars (Feodor III and Ivan V) as well as Princess Sophia Alekseyevna, the regent for Peter I.
- January 17 – By a vote of 141 to 91, England's Long Parliament passes the Vote of No Addresses, breaking off negotiations with King Charles I, and thereby setting the scene for the second phase of the English Civil War.
- January 20 – France's Royal Council votes to create the Académie royale after accepting the proposal of Martin de Charmois.
- January 26 – The Khmelnytsky Uprising in Ukraine, at the time part of the Republic of Both Nations (Polish–Lithuanian Commonwealth), begins as Bohdan Khmelnytsky becomes Hetman of the Cossacks.
- January 30 – The Dutch and the Spanish sign the Peace of Münster, ending the Eighty Years' War. The Spanish Empire recognizes the Dutch Republic of United Netherlands as a sovereign state (governed by the House of Orange-Nassau and the States General), which was previously a province of the Spanish Empire. The treaty is ratified by the Netherlands on May 15.
- February 11 – England's parliament passes stricter laws against performance of stage plays, providing for demolition of seats in theatres, imprisonment for actors and fines for spectators. The vote comes six days after the King's Men Players are arrested at the Cockpit Theatre during an illegal performance of Rollo Duke of Normandy.
- February 28 – King Christian IV of Denmark and Norway dies after a reign of almost 60 years without having named a successor. The Rigsraadet (Royal Council) and the Estates of the Realm will debate the matter for more than four months before deciding on July 6 to select Christian's oldest surviving son to become King Frederick III.
- March 31 – A major earthquake strikes Van in Ottoman Armenia.

=== April–June ===
- April 19 – First Battle of Guararapes: The Portuguese army defeats the Dutch army, in the north of Brazil.
- May 12 – Construction of the Kaunghmudaw Pagoda is completed in the Kingdom of Burma on the 6th waning of Kason, 1010, near the end of the reign of King Thalun. Hmannan Yazawin
- May 15 – The Peace of Münster is ratified by both the United Netherlands and the Spanish Empire.
- May 16 – England's Commonwealth Army massacres 70 Cornish royalists at Penzance, leading to a rebellion against England's Parliamentarians.
- May 20 – Wladyslaw IV Vasa, King of Poland and Grand Duke of Lithuania, dies after a reign of 15 years. The throne remains vacant for six months until Wladyslaw's younger half-brother, John II Casimir Vasa, is elected by Poland's Parliament.
- June 1 – The Roundheads defeat the Cavaliers at the Battle of Maidstone in the Second English Civil War.
- June 20 – Russian explorer Semyon Dezhnyov departs from Srednekolymsk to begin the first recorded voyage through the Bering Strait, between Asia and North America, and arrives in September.

=== July–September ===
- July 19 – The last major battle of the Thirty Years' War, the Battle of Prague ends in a Swedish victory after three days of fighting over the army of Bohemia. The troops loot the Prague Castle and steal many of Bohemia's most valuable artifacts.
- August 8 – Mehmed IV (1648–1687) succeeds Ibrahim I (1640–1648), as Ottoman Emperor.
- August 16 – The Imam of Oman, Nasir bin Murshid, dispatches an army to recapture Muscat from Portuguese occupiers, who eventually surrender the town on January 23, 1650.
- August 20 – The French Army, under the command of the Prince of Condé, defeats the Spaniards at the Battle of Lens. Upon learning of the victory, Cardinal Mazarin orders the arrest of the members of the Fronde Parlementaire, leading to an insurrection in Paris.
- August – The Cambridge Platform, a new, localized system of Christian church governance, is agreed upon and written down in New England.
- September 12 – At the Battle of Stirling in Scotland, the "Engagers" achieve victory over the Kirk Party.

=== October–December ===
- October 24 – Signing of the Treaties of Münster and Osnabrück concludes the Peace of Westphalia, ending the Thirty Years' War. Rulers of the Imperial States can personally convert to Protestant, Catholic or Calvinist. Ecclesiastical property is restored to the status of 1624, with the minorities of each of the three recognized faiths granted toleration of worship, and there is general recognition of exclusive sovereignty, including that of the Dutch Republic and Switzerland. France and Sweden gain territory, and the latter is granted an indemnity. However, France remains at war with Spain until 1659. Prisoners of war should be released and allowed to return to their homelands without ransom after hostilities end.
- October 31 – A treaty is signed between the Arabs and the Portuguese. The terms include a provision that the Portuguese should build fortresses at Kuriyat, Dibba Al-Hisn (Sharjah) and Muttrah (Oman).
- November 11 – France and the Netherlands agree to divide the Caribbean island of Saint Martin between them.
- December 6 – "Pride's Purge" in England: Elements of the New Model Army, under the leadership of Oliver Cromwell invade London and expel a majority of the Long Parliament, resulting in the creation of the Rump Parliament.

=== Date unknown ===
- In India, building of the Red Fort in Shahjahanabad is completed.
- The epic poem Padmavati is written by Alaol.
- Sabbatai Zevi declares himself the Messiah at Smyrna.
- George Fox founds the Religious Society of Friends (Quakers) in England.
- The Dutch artist Rembrandt produces the works Rembrandt drawing at a window and Beggars at the Door.
- Giacomo Carissimi composes Historia di Jephte, one of the first significant Latin oratorios.

== Births ==
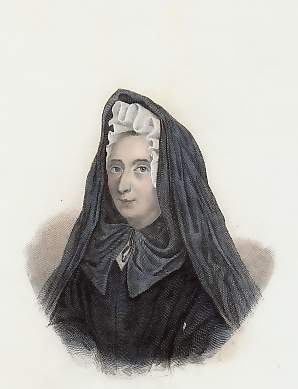
Jeanne Guyon

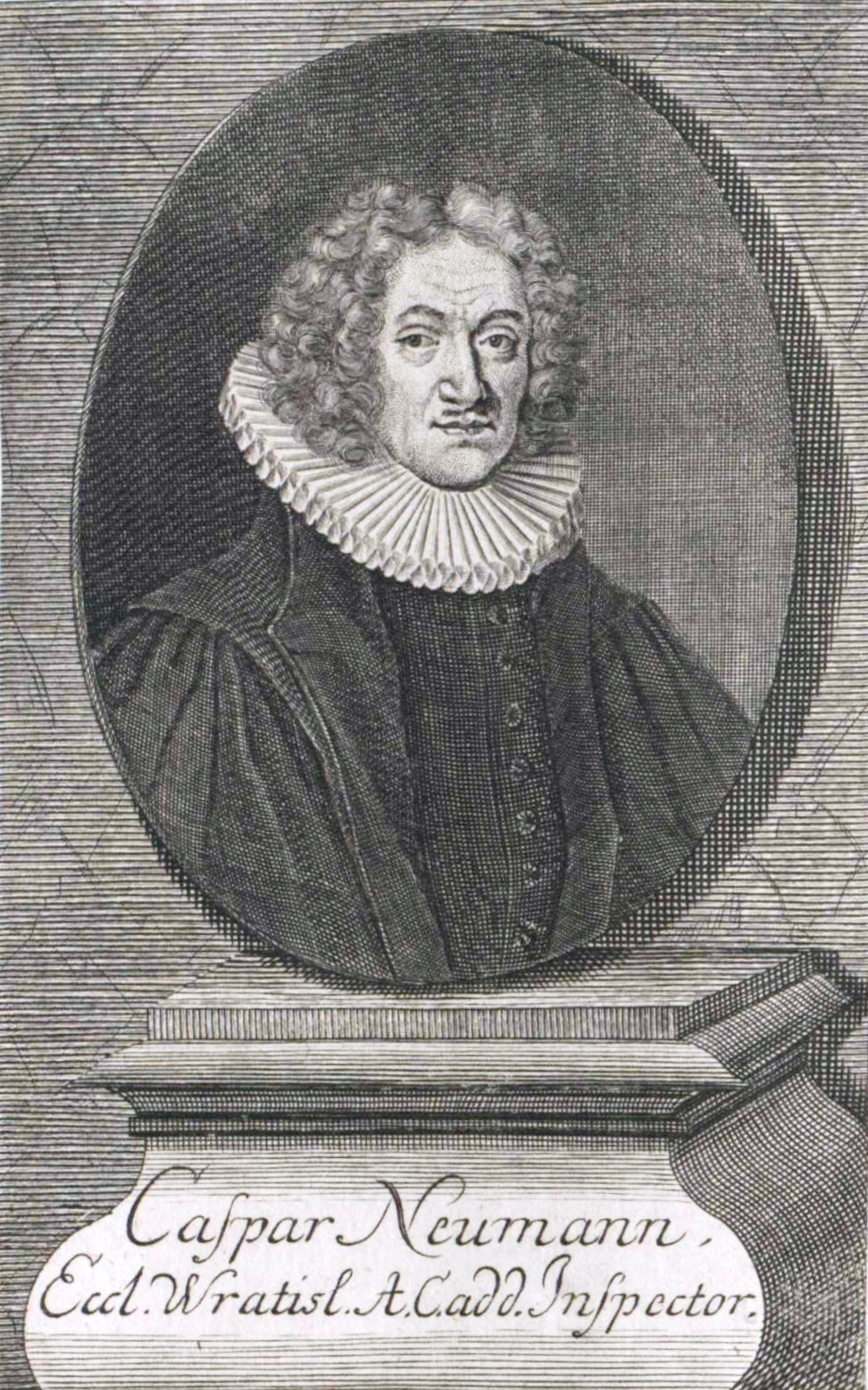
Caspar Neumann

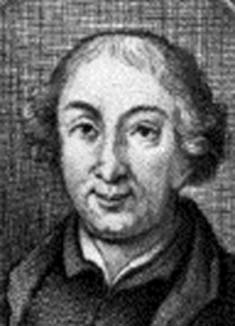
Tommaso Ceva

=== January–March ===
- January 1 – Matthijs Wulfraet, Dutch painter (d. 1727)
- January 14 – Clara Elisabeth von Platen, German noblewoman (d. 1700)
- February 1 – Elkanah Settle, English poet and playwright (d. 1724)
- February 23 – Arabella Churchill, English mistress of James II of England (d. 1730)
- February 26 – George Albert II, Count of Erbach-Fürstenau, held the fiefs of Fürstenau (d. 1717)
- March 2 – John Hales, English politician (d. 1723)
- March 5 – David Caspari, German Lutheran theologian (d. 1702)
- March 7 – Charles-Amador Martin, Canadian Catholic priest (d. 1711)
- March 12 – Charles de Sévigné, French baron (d. 1713)
- March 13 – Anne Henriette of Bavaria, Duchess of Guise (d. 1723)
- March 31 – Sebastiaen van Aken, Flemish painter (d. 1722)

=== April–June ===
- April 4 – Grinling Gibbons, Dutch-British sculptor and wood carver known for his work in England (d. 1721)
- April 5 – Nicolas Pasquin, early pioneer in New France (now Quebec) (d. 1708)
- April 7 – John Sheffield, 1st Duke of Buckingham and Normanby, English statesman and poet (d. 1721)
- April 8 – Charles, Count of Marsan, French noble (d. 1708)
- April 9 – Henri de Massue, Marquis de Ruvigny, 1st Earl of Galway, French soldier and diplomat (d. 1720)
- April 13 – Jeanne Marie Bouvier de la Motte Guyon, French mystic (d. 1717)
- April 16 – Antoine de Pas de Feuquières, French soldier (d. 1711)
- April 20 – Maurice Bocland, English Member of Parliament (d. 1710)
- April 23 – Philip Verheyen, Flemish physician (d. 1710)
- April 26 – King Peter II of Portugal (d. 1706)
- May 12 – Philip Foley, English politician (d. 1716)
- May 14 – René de Froulay de Tessé, French Marshal and diplomat (d. 1725)
- May 15 – William, Landgrave of Hesse-Rotenburg (from 1683) (d. 1725)
- May 23 – Johan Teyler, Dutch painter (d. 1709)
- May 24 – Albert V, Duke of Saxe-Coburg (d. 1699)
- June 18 – Petrus Houttuyn, Dutch botanist (d. 1709)

=== July–September ===
- July 2 – Arp Schnitger, German organ builder (d. 1719)
- July 19 – Jakub Kresa, Czech mathematician (d. 1715)
- July 21 – John Graham, 1st Viscount Dundee, Scottish general (d. 1689)
- July 25 – Joseph Anthelmi, French ecclesiastical historian (d. 1697)
- July 30 – Anne Marie Thérèse de Lorraine, Abbess of Remiremont (d. 1661)
- August 5 – Guichard Joseph Duverney, French anatomist (d. 1730)
- August 9 – Johann Michael Bach, German composer (d. 1694)
- August 11 – Jeremiah Shepard, American Puritan minister and the youngest son of Thomas Shepard (d. 1720)
- August 14 – Alphonse Henri, Count of Harcourt, French noble (d. 1718)
- August 22
  - Gerard Hoet, Dutch painter (d. 1733)
  - Tsarevich Dmitry Alexeyevich of Russia, first son and heir of Tsar Alexis of Russia (d. 1649)
- August 30 – Jean-Baptiste Morvan de Bellegarde, French Jesuit (d. 1734)
- September 2 – Magdalena Sibylle of Saxe-Weissenfels, German noblewoman (d. 1681)
- September 3 – Sarah Cloyce, American accused of witchcraft (d. 1703)
- September 6 – Johann Schelle, German composer (d. 1701)
- September 10 – Nicolas Desmarets, Controller-General of Finances under Louis XIV of France (d. 1721)
- September 14
  - Louis Nicolas le Tonnelier de Breteuil, French noble (d. 1728)
  - Caspar Neumann, German professor and clergyman (d. 1715)
- September 24 – Richard Graham, 1st Viscount Preston, English politician (d. 1695)
- September 27
  - Charles Gustav of Baden-Durlach, German general (d. 1703)
  - Michelangelo Tamburini, Italian Jesuit Superior General (d. 1730)

=== October–December ===
- October 3 – Élisabeth Sophie Chéron, French musician (d. 1711)
- October 6 – Henrietta Catharina, Baroness von Gersdorff, German noblewoman; poet (d. 1726)
- October 13 – Françoise Madeleine d'Orléans, French princess (d. 1664)
- October 19 – Domenico Viva, Italian Jesuit theologian (d. 1726)
- October 22 – Aleijda Wolfsen, Dutch Golden Age painter (d. 1692)
- October 29 – John Verelst, Dutch Golden Age painter (d. 1734)
- November 12
  - Louis-Hector de Callière, French politician (d. 1703)
  - Juana Inés de la Cruz, Mexican Hieronymite nun and polymath (d. 1695)
- November 15 – Juan María de Salvatierra, Italian Jesuit priest and missionary (d. 1717)
- November 16 – Charles Duncombe, English banker and politician (d. 1711)
- November 24 – Humphrey Humphreys, British bishop (d. 1712)
- November 27 – Petrus Codde, Dutch cleric, first Old Catholic bishop (d. 1710)
- December 5 – Charles François d'Angennes, Marquis de Maintenon, French nobleman, Caribbean buccaneer (d. 1691)
- December 6 – Leonard Goffiné, German Catholic priest and writer (d. 1719)
- December 15 – Gregory King, English statistician (d. 1712)
- December 20 – Tommaso Ceva, Italian Jesuit mathematician from Milan (d. 1737)
- December 23 – Robert Barclay, Scottish Quaker (d. 1690)

=== Date unknown ===
- John Coode, Colonial governor of Maryland (d. 1709)
- Lionel Copley, colonial governor of Maryland (d. 1693)
- Anne de Rohan-Chabot, short-term mistress of Louis XIV (d. 1709)
- Kong Shangren, Qing Chinese dramatist and poet (d. 1718).

== Deaths ==
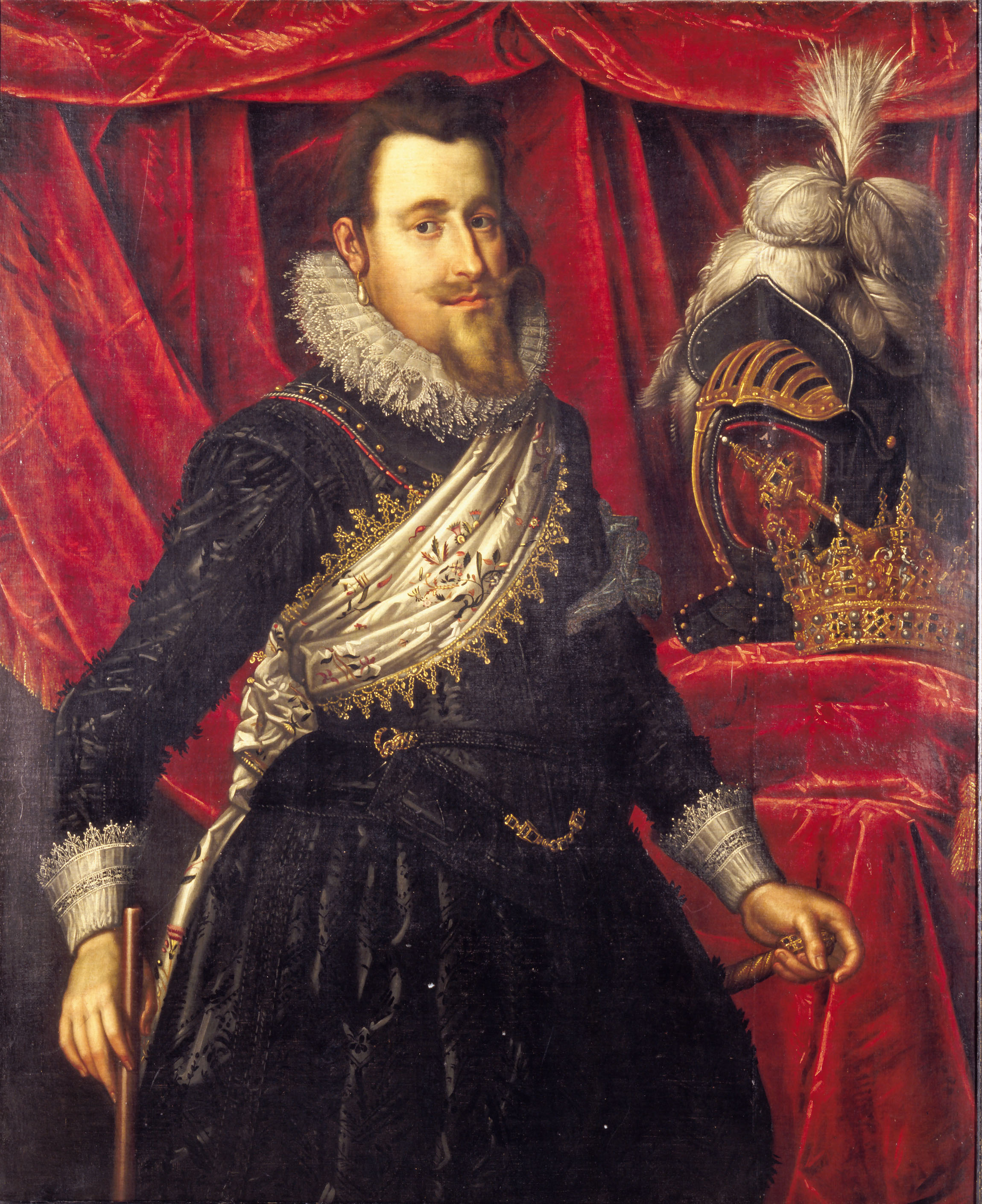
Christian IV of Denmark

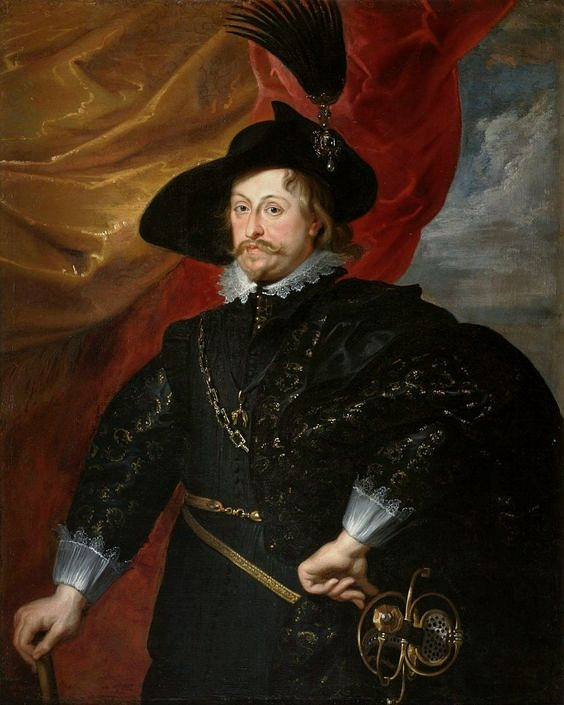
Władysław IV Vasa

- January 14 – Caspar Barlaeus, Dutch polymath (b. 1584)
- January 15 – St. Francisco Fernandez de Capillas, Spanish saint (b. 1607)
- January 20 – Countess Palatine Magdalene Catherine of Zweibrücken and Duchess of Birkenfeld (b. 1607)
- January 23 – Francisco de Rojas Zorrilla, Spanish dramatist (b. 1607)
- January 29 – Francesco Palliola, Italian Servant of God (b. 1612)
- February 22 – Wilhelm Lamormaini, Luxembourgian theologian (b. 1570)
- February 28 – Christian IV, King of Denmark and Norway (b. 1577)
- March 4 – Nicholas Stoughton, English politician (b. 1592)
- March 7 – Catherine of Lorraine, Abbess of Remiremont (b. 1573)
- March 12 – Tirso de Molina, Spanish writer (b. 1571)
- March 14 – Ferdinando Fairfax, 2nd Lord Fairfax of Cameron, English general (b. 1584)
- March 22 – Sir Edward Hussey, 1st Baronet, English politician (b. 1585)
- April 7 – Robert Roberthin, German poet (b. 1600)
- April 12 – Countess Catharina Belgica of Nassau, regent of Hanau-Münzenberg (b. 1578)
- April 29 – John Forbes, Scottish theologian (b. 1593)
- May 17 – Peter Melander Graf von Holzappel, Protestant military leader (b. 1589)
- May 20 – King Władysław IV Vasa of Poland (b. 1595)
- May 26 – Vincent Voiture, French poet (b. 1597)
- June 4 – George Seton, Lord Seton, Scottish noble (b. 1613)
- July 4 – Antoine Daniel, Jesuit missionary at Sainte-Marie among the Hurons (b. 1601)
- July 31 – Noël Juchereau, Quebec pioneer (b. 1593)
- August 2 – Claude Françoise de Lorraine, Princess of Lorraine (b. 1612)
- August 5 – Ivan III Drašković, Croatian nobleman and soldier (b. 1603)
- August 12 – Peter Sainthill, English politician (b. 1593)
- August 18 – Ibrahim, Ottoman Sultan (b. 1615)
- August 20 – Edward Herbert, 1st Baron Herbert of Cherbury, English diplomat, poet, and philosopher (b. 1583)
- August 24 – Juan Damián López de Haro, Spanish Catholic bishop of Puerto Rico (b. 1581)
- August 25 – Joseph Calasanz, Spanish priest and founder of Piarists (b. 1557)
- August 31 – Michele Mazzarino, Italian Catholic cardinal (b. 1605)
- September 1 – Marin Mersenne, French mathematician (b. 1588)
- October 11 – George I Rákóczi, Hungarian prince of Transylvania (b. 1593)
- October 15 – Simone Cantarini, Italian painter and engraver (b. 1612)
- November 1 – Ulrich II, Count of East Frisia, ruler of East Frisia (b. 1605)
- November 17 – Thomas Ford, English composer (b. c. 1580)
- November 25 – Daišan, Manchu politician (b. 1583)
- November 27 – Squire Bence, English politician (b. 1597)
- December 10 – Frederick IV, Duke of Brunswick-Lüneburg (b. 1574)
- December 17 – George Gillespie, Scottish theologian (b. 1613)
- December 25 – Claudia de' Medici (b. 1604)
- date unknown
  - Emerentia Krakow, Swedish war heroine
  - Cvijeta Zuzorić, Croatian poet (b. 1552)
