= 1730 =

1730 in various calendars
- Gregorian calendar: 1730; MDCCXXX
- Ab urbe condita: 2483
- Armenian calendar: 1179; ԹՎ ՌՃՀԹ
- Assyrian calendar: 6480
- Balinese saka calendar: 1651–1652
- Bengali calendar: 1136–1137
- Berber calendar: 2680
- British Regnal year: 3 Geo. 2 – 4 Geo. 2
- Buddhist calendar: 2274
- Burmese calendar: 1092
- Byzantine calendar: 7238–7239
- Chinese calendar: 己酉年 (Earth Rooster); 4427 or 4220 — to — 庚戌年 (Metal Dog); 4428 or 4221
- Coptic calendar: 1446–1447
- Discordian calendar: 2896
- Ethiopian calendar: 1722–1723
- Hebrew calendar: 5490–5491
- Hindu calendars
- Vikram Samvat: 1786–1787
- Shaka Samvat: 1651–1652
- Kali Yuga: 4830–4831
- Holocene calendar: 11730
- Igbo calendar: 730–731
- Iranian calendar: 1108–1109
- Islamic calendar: 1142–1143
- Japanese calendar: Kyōhō 15 (享保１５年)
- Javanese calendar: 1654–1655
- Julian calendar: Gregorian minus 11 days
- Korean calendar: 4063
- Minguo calendar: 182 before ROC 民前182年
- Nanakshahi calendar: 262
- Thai solar calendar: 2272–2273
- Tibetan calendar: ས་མོ་བྱ་ལོ་ (female Earth-Bird); 1856 or 1475 or 703 — to — ལྕགས་ཕོ་ཁྱི་ལོ་ (male Iron-Dog); 1857 or 1476 or 704

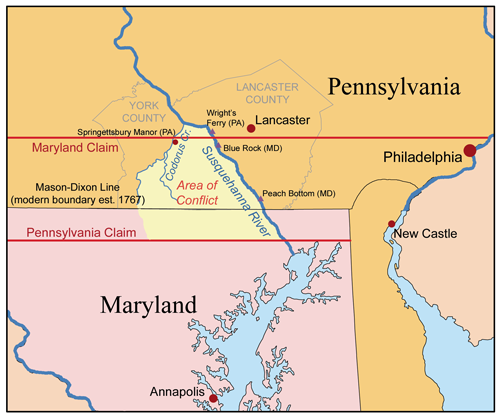
March 16: Cresap's War is started between the British colonies of Pennsylvania and Maryland.

1730 (MDCCXXX) was a common year starting on Sunday of the Gregorian calendar and a common year starting on Thursday of the Julian calendar, the 1730th year of the Common Era (CE) and Anno Domini (AD) designations, the 730th year of the 2nd millennium, the 30th year of the 18th century, and the 1st year of the 1730s decade. As of the start of 1730, the Gregorian calendar was 11 days ahead of the Julian calendar, which remained in localized use until 1923.

== Events ==
=== January–March ===
- January 30 (January 19 O.S.) – At dawn, Emperor Peter II of Russia dies of smallpox, aged 14 in Moscow, on the eve of his projected marriage.
- February 26 (February 15 O.S.) – Anna of Russia (Anna Ioannovna) becomes reigning Empress of Russia following the death of her cousin Emperor Peter II.
- February 28 – Vitus Bering returns to the Russian capital of Saint Petersburg after completing the First Kamchatka expedition.
- March 5 – The 1730 papal conclave to elect a new Pope for the Roman Catholic church begins with 30 Cardinals, 12 days after the death of Pope Benedict XIII. By the time his successor is elected on July 12, there are 56 Cardinals.
- March 9 – General Nader Khan of Persia opens the first campaign of the Ottoman–Persian War (1730–1735), guiding the Persian Army from Shiraz and starting the Western Persia Campaign against the Ottoman Empire.
- March 12 – John Glas is deposed from the Church of Scotland; the Glasite sect forms around him.
- March 16 – The establishment by Thomas Cresap of Wright's Ferry under the authority of the Province of Pennsylvania becomes the basis for Cresap's War, a nine-year-long conflict also known as the Maryland-Pennsylvania boundary dispute; the conflict mainly centers in Lancaster County, Pennsylvania and York County, Pennsylvania on either bank of the Susquehanna River.

=== April–June ===
- April 8 – Congregation Shearith Israel, the first synagogue in New York City, is dedicated.
- May 9 (April 28 O.S.) – The coronation of Anna of Russia as Empress of Russia takes place in Saint Petersburg.
- May 15 – Charles Townshend, 2nd Viscount Townshend, retires from his role in the government of Great Britain, leaving Robert Walpole as sole and undisputed leader of the Cabinet (i.e., prime minister). In the new Walpole ministry, Sir William Strickland, 4th Baronet, becomes Secretary at War, and Henry Pelham is Paymaster of the Forces; Spencer Compton, 1st Earl of Wilmington briefly becomes Lord Privy Seal.
- June 1 – Enslaved woman Sally Basset is put on trial for murder in Bermuda; she will eventually be convicted and burned at the stake.
- June 19 – At the urging of Sir William Gooch, the Virginia House of Burgesses passes the Virginia Tobacco Inspection Act to regulate the quality of tobacco in Virginia, 46 to 5.
- June 27 – French explorer Alphonse de Pontevez, commanding the frigate Le Lys, claims an Indian Ocean atoll for France and names it after himself as the Alphonse Atoll. The next day, he claims and names the St. François Atoll.

=== July–September ===
- July 8 – 1730 Valparaíso earthquake: An earthquake with an estimated magnitude of 9.1 strikes Valparaíso, in modern-day Chile but at this time in the Viceroyalty of Peru.
- July 12 – The papal conclave selects Cardinal Lorenzo Corsini over Cardinal Pietro Marcellino Corradini as the successor to Pope Benedict XIII. Corsini becomes Pope Clement XII as the 246th pope.
- August 4 – Maria Madlener becomes the last person to be executed after the Galgeninsel witch trials in Bavaria, and is beheaded by sword.
- August 5 – Prince Frederick of Prussia, the eldest son of King Frederick William and a high-ranking officer, attempts to flee to England after deserting the Prussian Army and is captured along with his fellow officer Hans Hermann von Katte. Katte is executed, and Crown Prince Frederick is imprisoned at Küstrin (modern-day Kostrzyn nad Odrą in Poland) for a year before being forgiven by his father. Prince Frederick later succeeds his father as King and will be remembered as Frederick the Great.
- August 12 – General Nader Khan of Persia captures Tabriz from the Ottoman Empire, bringing an end to the Western Persia Campaign, the first major action in the Ottoman–Persian War (1730–1735). Tabriz becomes a permanent part of Iran. Nader leaves the city four days later to begin the Herat Campaign of 1731.
- August 25 – French Protestant Marie Durand is imprisoned in the Tower of Constance at Aigues-Mortes for her defiance of the Roman Catholic government, and is kept captive for the next 38 years. During her incarceration, she continues to resist converting to Catholicism as a condition of release. She is finally set free on April 14, 1768 and lives 8 more years.
- September 1 – A volcano erupts on Lanzarote, the easternmost of the Canary Islands and threatens the Spanish inhabitants. On Gran Canaria, the regent of the islands reports to Madrid that the flames are visible even from 130 miles (210 km) away.
- September 17 – Mahmud I (d. 1754) succeeds Ahmed III (ruled since 1703) as Ottoman Emperor.

=== October–December ===
- November 6 – After being convicted of treason for attempting to desert the Prussian Army with Crown Prince Frederick, Hans Hermann von Katte is beheaded at the Küstrin Prison. Frederick's father, King Frederick William, forces the prince to watch the execution.
- December 9 – The first documented notice in North America about freemasonry is published in The Pennsylvania Gazette in an article by its publisher, Benjamin Franklin.
- December 27 – The Dutch East India Company ends an almost 11-year effort of trying to maintain a colony around Delagoa Bay in southern Africa in modern-day Mozambique. The entire population of the settlement, Fort Lydzammheid (near modern-day Maputo) is evacuated by the ships Snuffelaar, Zeepost and Feyenoord and the group returns to Cape Town.

== Births ==
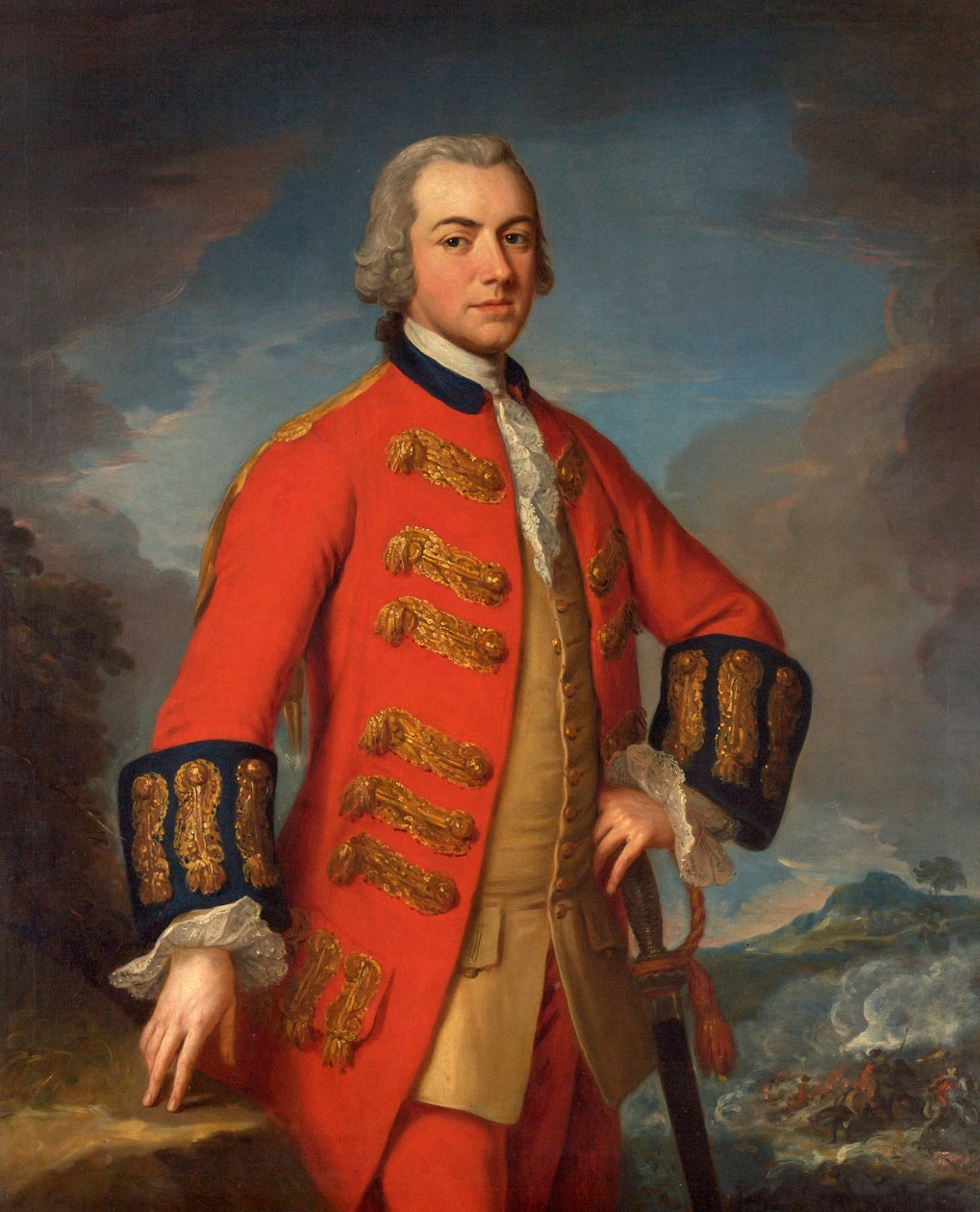
Henry Clinton

- January 3 – Velu Nachiyar, queen regnant of Sivaganga (d. 1796)
- March 7 – Louis Auguste Le Tonnelier de Breteuil, last prime minister of the French monarchy (d. 1807)
- April 1 – Salomon Gessner, Swiss painter and newspaper publisher (d. 1788)
- April 16 – Henry Clinton, British general (d. 1795)
- April 26 – John Moore, Archbishop of Canterbury (d. 1805)
- May 13 – Charles Watson-Wentworth, 2nd Marquess of Rockingham, Prime Minister of Great Britain (d. 1782)
- May 28 – Maria Angela Ardinghelli, Italian scientific translator (d. 1825)
- June 21 – Motoori Norinaga, Japanese philologist, scholar of the kokugaku school (d. 1801)
- July 10 – Jean-Baptiste Willermoz, French Freemason (d. 1824)
- July 12
  - Anna Barbara Reinhart, Swiss mathematician (d. 1796)
  - Josiah Wedgwood, English pottery manufacturer and abolitionist (d. 1795)
- July 26 – Charles Messier, French astronomer (d. 1817)
- August 1 – Frederick Hervey, 4th Earl of Bristol, English Anglican prelate (d. 1803)
- August 27 – Johann Georg Hamann, German philosopher (d. 1788)
- September 7 – Elisabetta de Gambarini, English composer (d. 1765)
- September 17 – Friedrich Wilhelm von Steuben, Prussian army officer (d. 1794)
- November 23 – William Moultrie, American general (d. 1805)
- December 14 – James Bruce, Scottish explorer (d. 1794)
- December 25 – Filippo Mazzei, Italian physician, friend of Thomas Jefferson (d. 1816)
- December 30 – William Hamilton, British diplomat, antiquary (d. 1803)
- date unknown – Jacob Alyashar, Talmudist and emissary (d. c. 1790)

== Deaths ==
- January 1
  - Daniel Finch, 2nd Earl of Nottingham, English politician (b. 1647)
  - Samuel Sewall, English-born judge (b. 1652)
- January 7 – Árni Magnússon, Icelandic scholar and manuscript collector (b. 1663)
- January 18 – Antonio Vallisneri, Italian scientist (b. 1661)
- January 30 – Emperor Peter II of Russia (b. 1715)
- February 9 – Johann Georg von Eckhart, German historian (b. 1664)
- February 12 – Luca Carlevarijs, Italian painter (b. 1663)
- February 21 – Pope Benedict XIII, Italian pontiff (b. 1649)
- March 20 – Adrienne Lecouvreur, French actress (b. 1692)
- March 22 – Benedetto Pamphili, Italian cardinal, patron of the arts, composer and librettist (b. 1653)
- March 23 – Charles I, Landgrave of Hesse-Kassel (or Hesse-Cassel) (b. 1654)
- May 13 – Sir Justinian Isham, 4th Baronet, English landowner and Member of Parliament (b. 1658)
- May 30 – Arabella Churchill, English mistress of James II of England (b. 1648)
- June 6 – Alain Emmanuel de Coëtlogon, Marshal of France in the reign of Louis XIV and Louis XV (b. 1646)
- June 18 – Yinxiang, Qing dynasty prince (b. 1686)
- June 19 – Thomas Trevor, 1st Baron Trevor, English judge and politician (b. 1658)
- June 21 – Sarah Basset, Bermudian slave, origin of legend
- June 28 – Joachim Bouvet, French Jesuit active in China (b. 1656)
- July 7 – Olivier Levasseur, French pirate
- July 9 – Issachar Berend Lehmann, German-Jewish banker, Court Jew in Hanover (b. 1661)
- July 18 – François de Neufville, duc de Villeroy, French soldier (b. 1644)
- August 10 – Sébastien de Brossard, French composer and music theorist (b. 1655)
- August 12 – Benedicta Henrietta of the Palatinate, German princess (b. 1652)
- August 19 – James Ogilvy, 4th Earl of Findlater, Scottish politician (b. 1664)
- September 9 – Charles FitzRoy, 2nd Duke of Cleveland, English courtier (b. 1662)
- September 10 – Guichard Joseph Duverney, French anatomist (b. 1648)
- September 14 – Sophia Elisabet Brenner, Swedish writer (b. 1659)
- September 27 – Laurence Eusden, English poet (b. 1688)

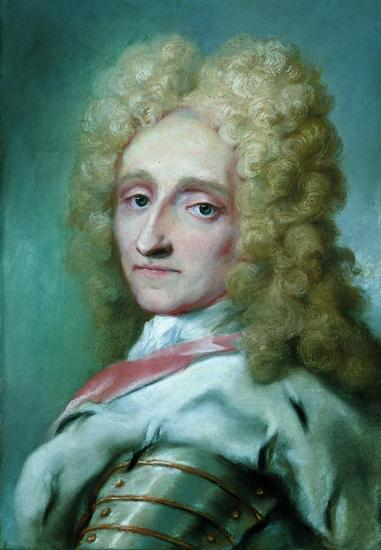
Frederick IV

- October 12 – Frederick IV, King of Denmark and Norway (b. 1671)
- October 16 – Antoine de la Mothe Cadillac, French explorer (b. 1658)
- October 23 – Anne Oldfield, English actress (b. 1683)
- November 1 – Luigi Ferdinando Marsili, Italian soldier and naturalist (b. 1658)
- November 21 – François de Troy, French portrait artist (b. 1645)
- December 31 – Carlo Gimach, Maltese architect, engineer and poet (b. 1651)
