= Jeane Gardiner =

Jeane Gardiner (died 26 May 1651 in Saint George, Bermuda) was an alleged witch. She is one of the few people to have been executed for witchcraft in Bermuda.

Gardiner was the wife of Ralph Gardiner, and was put on trial by the Governor, Captain Josias Forster. She was accused of affecting a woman with magic. She had threatened that she would cramp Tomasin, a mulatto woman, who was later struck blind and dumb for two hours. Another woman, Anne Bowen, was tried with her.

Gardiner pleaded not guilty. A jury of women was appointed to search her body: Mrs. Ellen Burrowes, Mrs. Flora Wood, Mrs. Eliz. Stowe, Allice Sparkes, Eliz. Brangman. She was subjected to the ordeal of water, and after being thrown twice in the sea, she floated and could not sink. As a result, she was judged guilty of witchcraft and was sentenced to death. She was executed on May 26, 1651. The fate of Anne Bowen is unknown.

In the period of 1651-1696, twenty-two witch trials were held in Bermuda, eighteen women and four men, of which five women and one man was executed. The trial against Sarah Basset (or Sally Basset) in 1730 is sometimes counted among them. Most of them were held in the 1650s when witch trials were common in England. The most common accusation was sickness afflicted upon slaves by use of magic.

== Literature ==
- Lefroy, Sir John Henry (1877). Memorials of the Discovery and Early Settlement of the Bermudas Or Somers Islands, 1515-1687 [i.e. 1511-1687]. Longmans, Green, and Company.
