= Charles-Amador Martin =

Priest, singer and composer in New France

Charles-Amador Martin (7 March 1648 – 19 June 1711) was a priest, singer and composer of sacred music in New France. He was the second priest to be ordained in what is now Canada, the first being Germain Morin. He spent most of his priesthood in or near Quebec City, where he became known for his participation in church services as a musician.

== Early life ==
Martin was born in Quebec, the son of Abraham Martin, a river pilot in New France, and Marguerite Langlois. He attended Jesuit College and trained as a priest at the Séminaire de Québec at a young age.

== Career ==
Martin was ordained by Bishop Laval in March 1671. His first posting was at Beauport in 1672.

Martin assisted with elections at the Hôtel-Dieu de Québec in 1673. He was a member of the Seminary of Foreign Missions at Quebec, where he taught for a number of years and also acted as bursar for a period. His singing ability is mentioned by Father Jérôme Lalemant at one point in his career.

He was later a Canon of the Quebec Cathedral, where he was commissioned by Bishop François de Laval to raise the musical quality of the religious ceremonies.

A number of musical compositions that have been attributed to Father Martin, including the first preserved Canadian musical composition, "Prose de Sacrae Familliae"; research has not found conclusive evidence that he is the composer.

== See also ==
- Music of Canada
