= Keian =

Period of Japanese history (1648–1652)

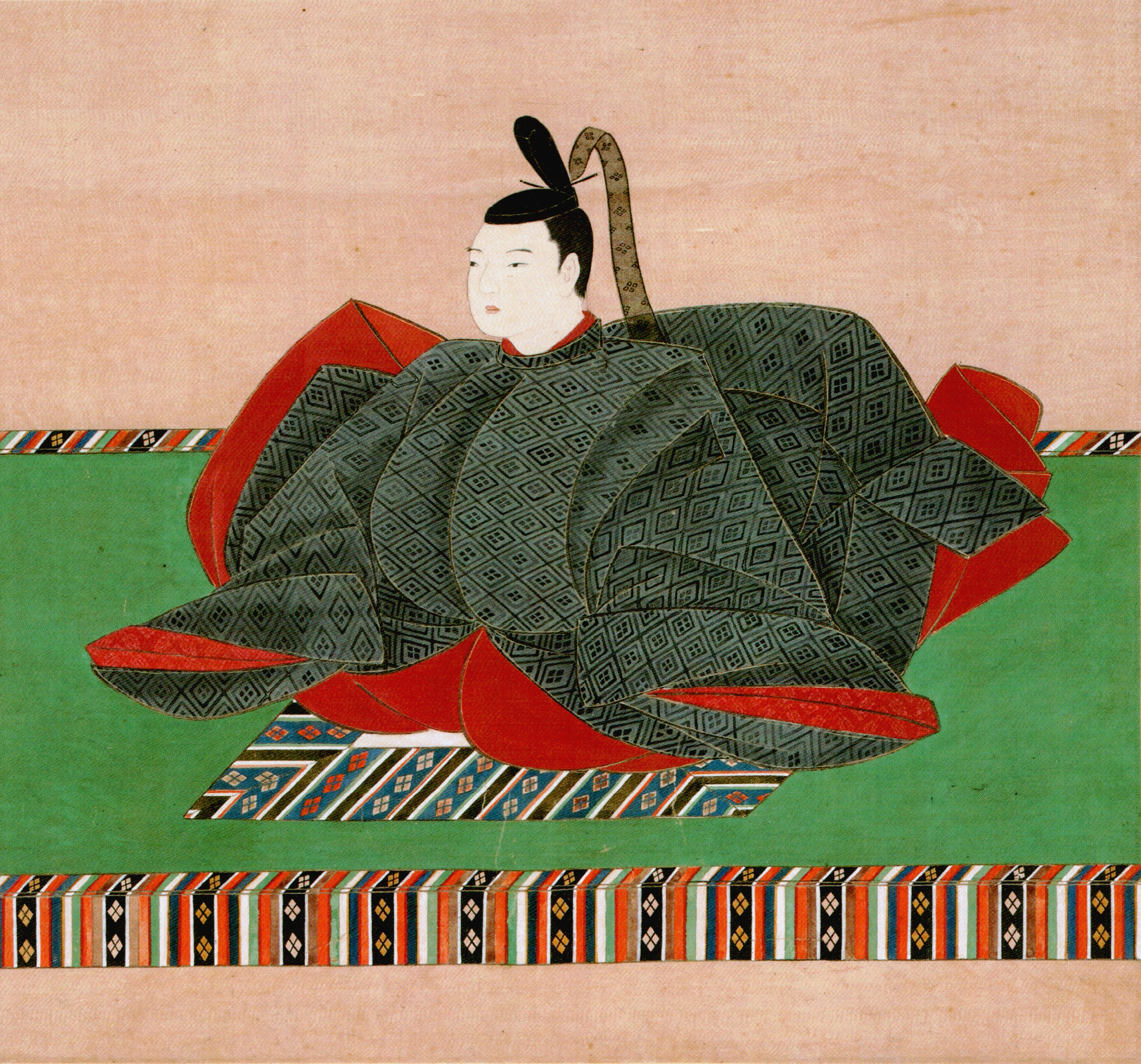
Emperor Go-Kōmyō

Keian (慶安) was a Japanese era name (年号, nengō; "year name") after Shōhō and before Jōō. This period spanned the years from February 1648 through September 1652. The reigning emperor was Go-Kōmyō-tennō (後光明天皇).

== Change of era ==
- 1648 Keian gannen (慶安元年): The new era name was created in response to criticism that Shōhō was too closely related to Shōbō (焼亡, meaning "death by burning"). The previous era ended and a new one commenced in Shōhō 5, on the 5th day of the 2nd month.

The new era name was drawn from the Chinese classic, The I Ching: "At the end happiness, joy of quiet righteousness, answer the world unlimited" (乃終有慶、安貞之吉、応地無疆):

== Events of the Keian era ==
- April 1, 1649 (Keian 2, 20th day of the 2nd month): There was a major earthquake in Edo.
- 1651 (Keian 4): Keian Uprising. Plans by well-organized rōnin to attack several Tokugawa strongholds simultaneously were timely discovered. The attempt plan to overthrow the Edo Bakufu by Marubashi Chūya and Yui Shōsetsu was thwarted.
- 1652 (Keian 5, 5th month): Nihon Ōdai Ichiran is first published in Kyoto under the patronage of the tairō Sakai Tadakatsu, daimyō of the Obama Domain of Wakasa Province.

== Notes ==
Preceded by Shōhō (正保)	Era or nengō Keian (慶安); 1648–1652	Succeeded by Jōō (承応)
