= Jean-Baptiste Morvan de Bellegarde =

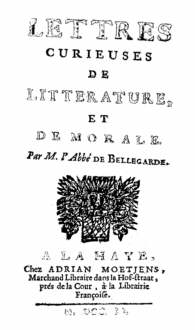
Jean-Baptiste Morvan de Bellegarde, Lettres curieuses.

Jean-Baptiste Morvan de Bellegarde (30 August 1648, in Nantes – 26 April 1734), abbé de Bellegarde, was a French Jesuit for 15 years, before joining Francis de Sales's order. He was the author of a number of works on ethics, religion, and education, which included Réflexions sur le ridicule (1696) and Réflexions sur la politesse des mœurs (1698).
