= Nicolas Pasquin =

Nicolas Paquin
- Born: 5 April 1648; La Poterie-Cap-d'Antifer, France
- Died: 16 December 1708 (aged 60); Sainte-Famille, Québec
- Occupations: Carpenter, Farmer
- Spouse: Marie-Françoise Plante
- Children: 11

Nicolas Paquin (April 5, 1648 – November 26, 1708) was an early pioneer in New France now Quebec, Canada), a carpenter and the ancestor of virtually all of the Paquins in North America.

== Early life ==
Jean Pasquin, the father of Nicolas Pasquin, lived in La Poterie, France as early as 1612. Nicolas was born on April 5, 1648. He came to New France in 1672.

After completing his apprenticeship as master carpenter, Nicolas Pasquin was hired by Jean Deschamps to his son Jean-Baptiste François Deschamps, sieur de the Bouteillerie, established in Canada since 1671. He signed a three-year contract.

== Immigration to New France ==
Nicolas left France in the spring of 1672 in the direction of the New France to arrive in Quebec City during the summer of the same year. He worked 3 years for the sieur de Bouteillerie for three years, in the seigneury of the Rivière-Ouelle, Quebec.

Subsequently, Nicolas joined to the factory Château-Richer, near Quebec City. There, he met his future wife, Marie-Françoise Plante. Marie-Françoise was the daughter of the sieur Jean Plante and Marie-Françoise Boucher. It was one of the first children of French, to emerge in the new France family. She was born January 27, 1655, Château-Richer.

Nicolas and Marie-Françoise was married November 18, 1676 the church Notre-Dame-de-la-Visitation, in the parish of Château Richer. Note that this marriage was greatly famous because the plant had much knowledge in the colony because they had spent a good part of their lives. In addition, the plant family had a large number of its members in this country and all were present at this happy event.

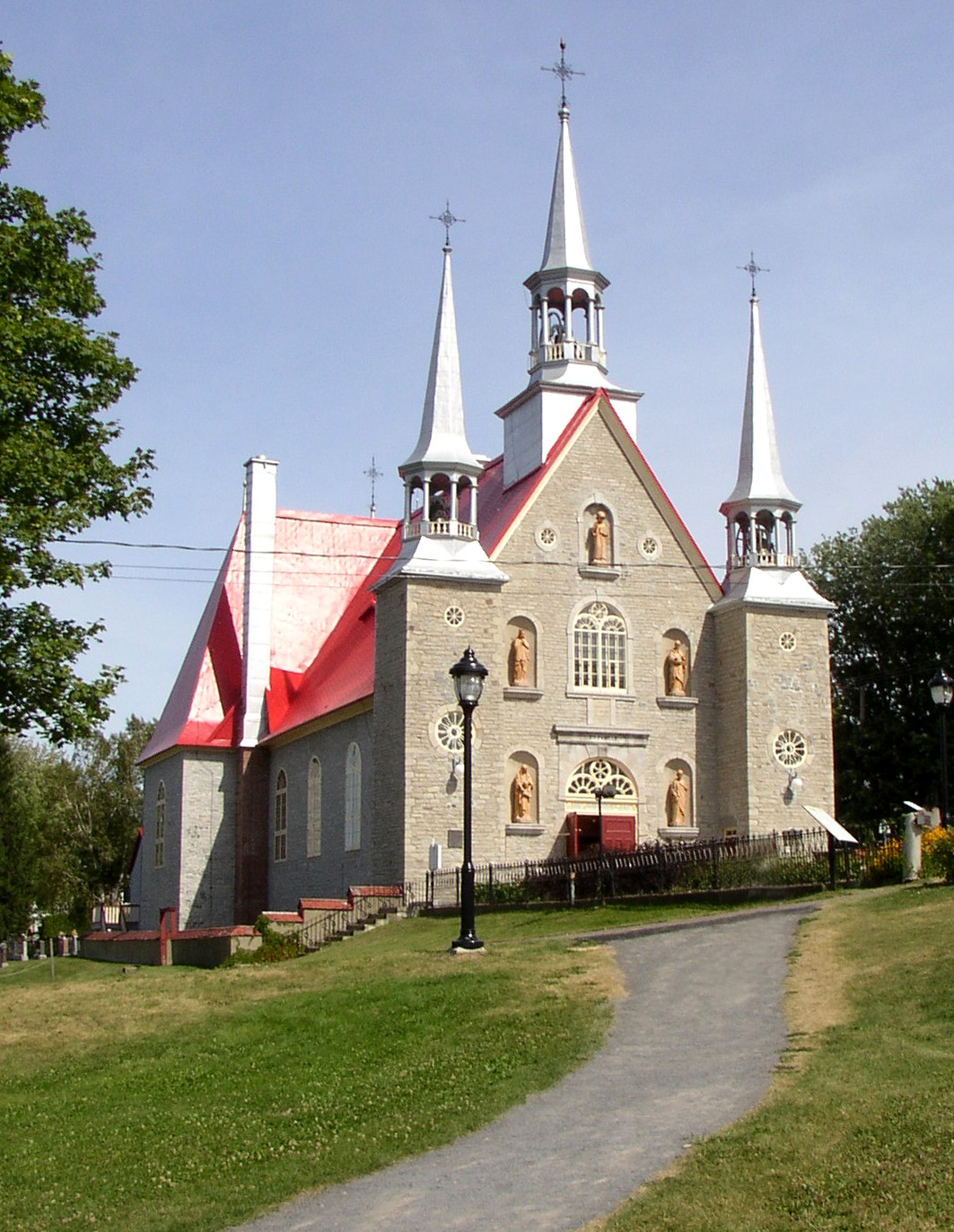
Church of Sainte-Famille

Following their marriage, both spouses elected domicile at the Côte de Beaupré, Château Richer, and Nicolas continued to work at the factory for a while. In the first year of their marriage, Marie-Françoise gave birth to her first child she named Nicolas, just like her husband. In 1678, Marie-Françoise gave birth to the second child of the couple that they taken Geneviève. In this same year, Nicolas bought a land on the île d ' Orléans, in the parish of Sainte-Famille. This earth, he bought it from a man named Jean Moreau. Compared to soldiers and labourers who earned that sixty pounds per year of work, Nicolas en earned one hundred fifty pounds, so Nicolas earned more than double the average salary of that time.

Note that this land in the cadastre of new-France, in the parish of Sainte-Famille of the St. Lawrence Island, numbered 11. The current cadastre this land lies at number 231-233, either the last dwelling of the parish of Ste-Famille toward the St. Peter parish. The Paquin appear to have been prosperous people in this era of colonization. Although he cultivated a great land and it auto-suffisait on many plans, Nicolas still continued to offer its services to master-carpenter for so make sure to avoid periods of food shortages.

In 1693, Nicolas was hospitalized at the Hotel-Dieu de Québec and it is not known why. Despite their many family responsibilities, Nicolas and Marie-Françoise is involved in the community. For example, in this same year of 1698, when the Committee of helping the poor was founded in the île d ' Orléans, it is Nicolas who was appointed Director of the passers-by. It was he who took care of those who sought charity from parishioners. His wife, Marie-Françoise and three of her companions were charged to collect alms.

In 1700, the Lord of the Bouteillerie, where Nicolas was committed to working in 1672, owed him still one hundred ninety pounds salary and Nicolas in was don verbally at his parish of Sainte-Famille. Thus, the Church could be reimbursed this money which was due to Nicolas, by the Sieur de the Bouteillerie. In Exchange, the parish joined to say annually four masses for the repose of the soul of Nicolas, his wife and their children following their dead.

It was on 10 October 1705, that Marie-Françoise and Nicolas attended the first wedding of one of their children, Nicolas II. The latter married Marie-Anne Perreault. Then, it was already established in the seigneury of Mr. Deschambault., since 1702. June 12, 1708, it was the turn of Marie to marry. She married Jean-Baptiste Marcotte, the Church of the Holy Family parish, at the île d ' Orléans.

== Death ==
Nicolas Paquin died December 16, 1708, at the age of sixty years, probably worn out by work. He had done it its duty of good Christian also working by the sweat of his brow, from dawn until dark, his life during.

Following the death of Nicolas, was son-in-law Marcotte, married in the same year with Marie Paquin, who became his mother-in-law support and the support of the Paquin family, still young. At the death of Nicolas, most children were still at home. So, Marie-Françoise had ended rearing her four minor children, by sharing his home with his daughter Mary and son-in-law Jean-Baptiste Marcotte.

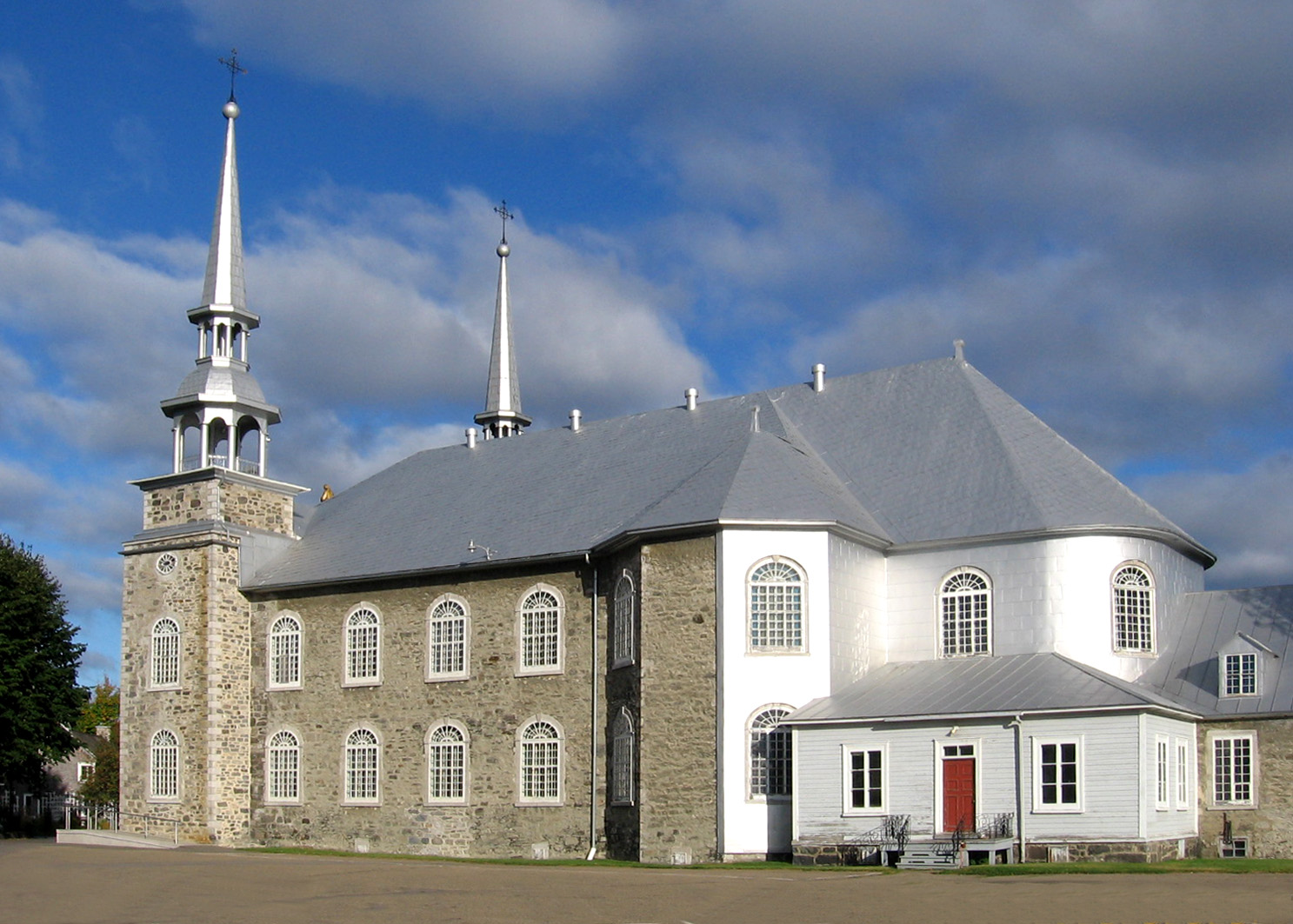
Church of Déchambault

On July 23, 1711 was a great day for the Paquin family since that day it y had a double wedding of the two daughters of Marie-Françoise, or Mary Magdalene and Geneviève. Mary Magdalene was twenty-one years old and she married Jacques Perrault. Geneviève, for its part, was 23 years old and she married Jean-François Naud. The two girls will go to settle at Dennis, Lordship where their husbands already each have a land.

Marie-Françoise had more than two children under his charge, either Marie-Anne and Jean-Baptiste. She could now help Marie, his daughter giving him help with his own daughters. Together Mary and Marie-Françoise raised three daughters of the union of Mary and Jean-Baptiste Marcotte.

In 1720, while she was only sixteen, Marie-Anne married Pierre Groleau, a resident of Deschambault, she had probably met during one of his visits to this Lordship to go see his sisters and his brothers Nicolas, who were already settled there for some time. Jean-Baptiste, the youngest of the family was nineteen years old and worked on the family land. So we can say that Marie had finished to raise all her children, at this time.

Marie-Françoise, widow of Nicolas died on 18 April 1726 and she was buried in the parish of Sainte-Famille on the île d ' Orléans. It had therefore survived him eighteen years. Shortly after the death of his mother, Jean-Baptiste just like his sisters and brother, went to settle in the seigneury of Deschambault. He was married in 1731 with Marguerite Chapelain.

Nicolas Paquin and Marie-Françoise, the strain of this lineage of the Paquins couple, had an eventful life by the various events of everyday life, but otherwise they had a peaceful life.

== Family ==
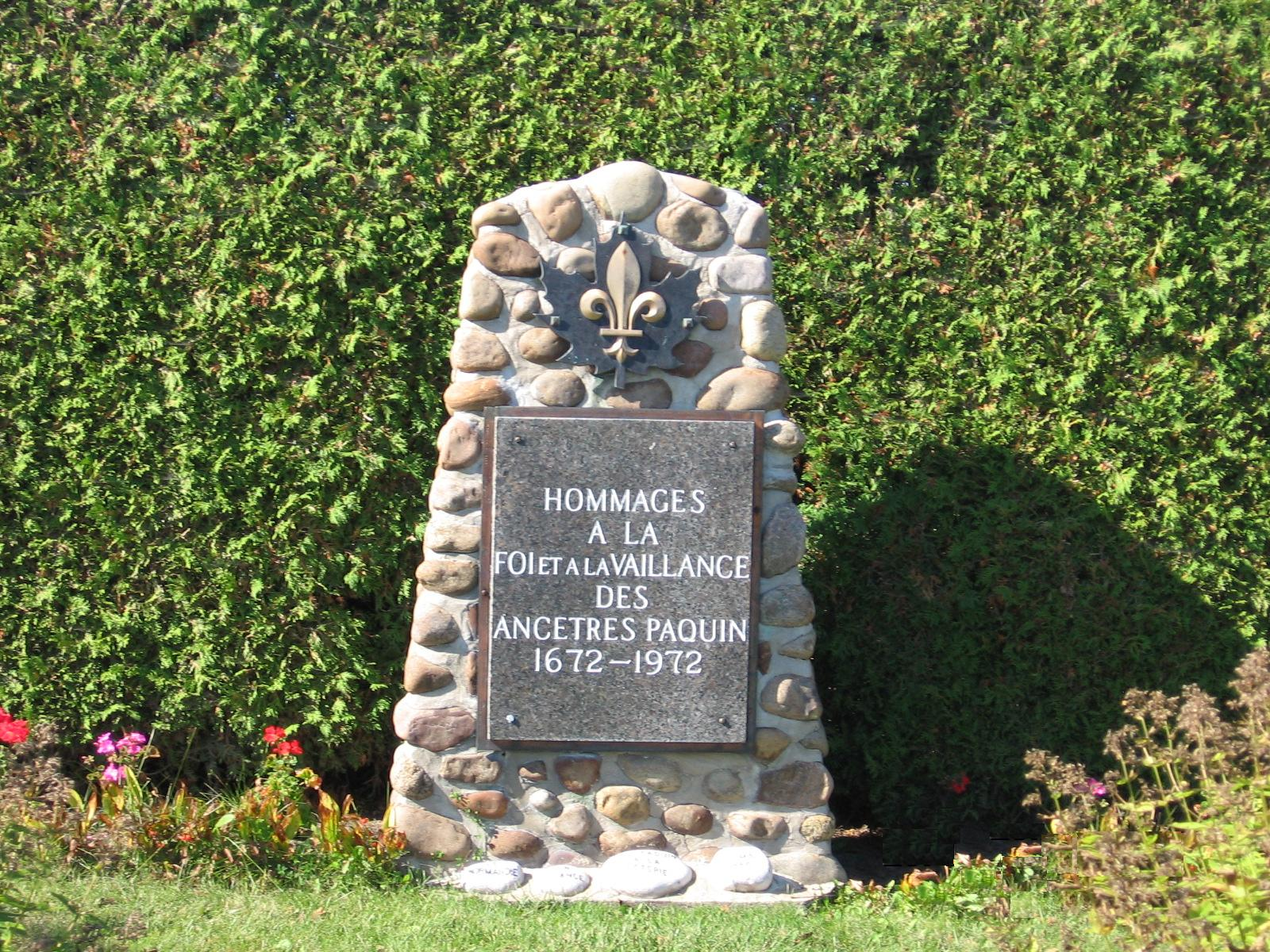
Monument dedicated to the Paquin ancestors

The children of Nicolas and Marie-Françoise:

- Marguerite: Born on 1-01-1677. Dead on 10-01 - 1677
- Nicolas II: born in 1677. He married Marie-Anne Perreault on 10-10 - 1705. Widower
- Marie Perreault, he married Marie-Thérèse Groleau 1720 at Deschambault. He died on 12-04 - 1731, at Deschambault. * Geneviève: Born in 1678. She married Jean-François Naud, a bourgeois,
- Marie: born 5-12-1679. She died on 10-12-1679, on 23-07 - 1711 in the parish of Ste-Famille on the île d ' Orléans. She was 5 days old.
- Marie: Born on 18-11 - 1680. She married Jean-Baptiste Marcotte, 12-06 - 1781, in the parish of Ste-Famille on the île d ' Orléans.
- Gatien: Born on 26-04 - 1683. He died on 6-05 - 1683. He was 11 days old.
- Antoine: Born on 18-04 - 1684. * Jean: Born August 23, 1686. He died on 15-11 - 1688 * Geneviève: born on 9-10-1688
- Marie-Madeleine: born on 10-12-1690. She married Jacques Perrault on 23-07 - 1711.
- Marie-Anne: She married Pierre Groleau, in 1720. They lived at Deschambault
- Louis: Born on 30-04 - 1693. He died on 19-04 - 1703. He was 10 years old.
- John Baptist: Born May 15, 1701. He married Margaret chaplain on 04-02 - 1731

== Name Variations ==
If France, the name Pasquin continued.

In Canada the s was dropped and became Paquin.

In the United States, other name variations have evolved including Paquin and Pacquin.

== Notable Descendants ==
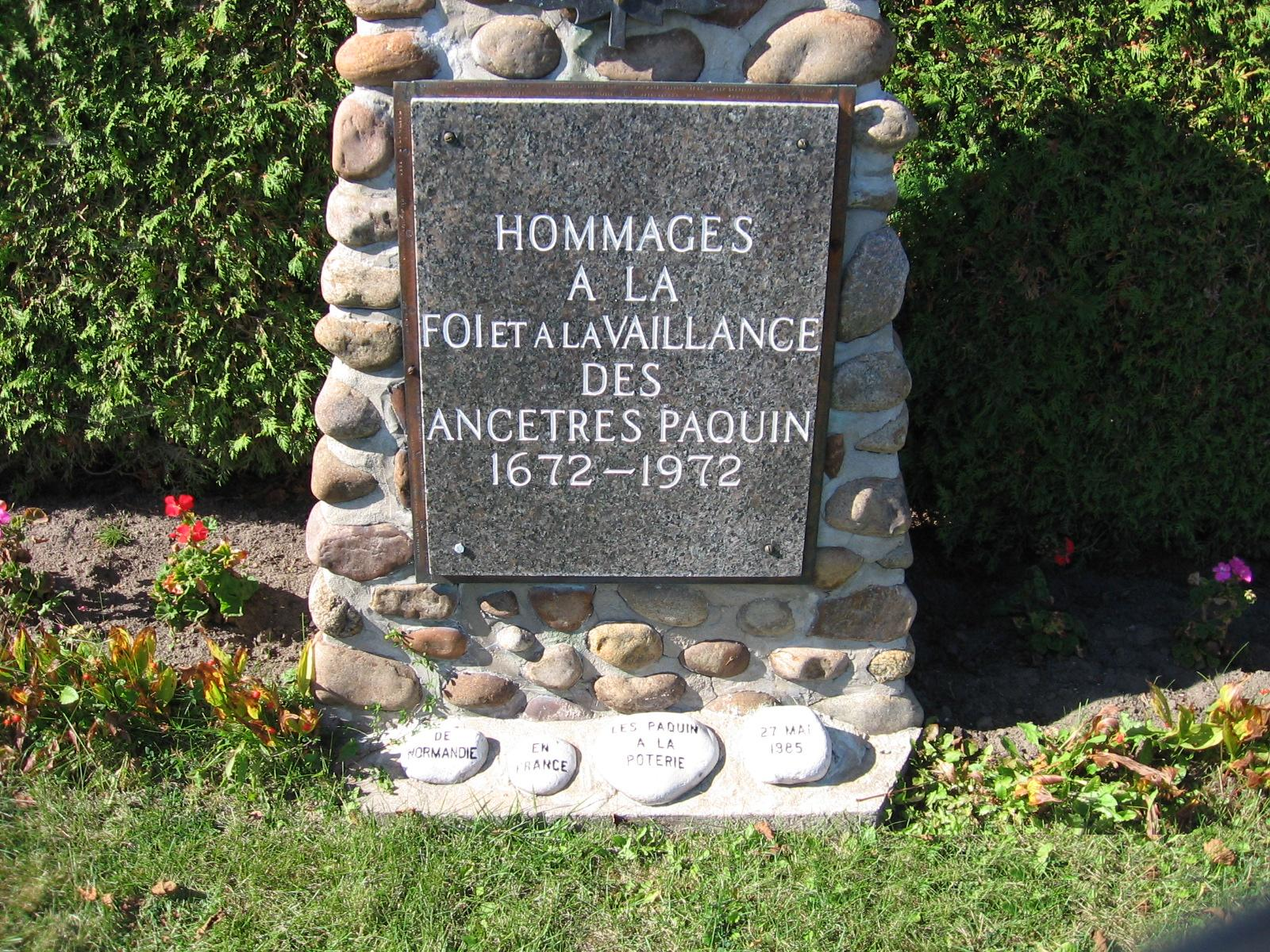
Monument dedicated to the Paquin families

- Pierre Paquin (born 1943), Well-known Audio Recording Engineer and Musicologist
- Anna Paquin (born 1982), New Zealand actress
- Ethan Paquin (born 1975), American poet
- Laurent Paquin (born 1971), Canadian comedian and talk show host
- Jeanne Paquin (1869–1936), French fashion designer
- Leo Paquin (1910–1993), American football player
- Luke Paquin (born 1978), American rock guitarist
- Marie-Thérèse Paquin (1905–1997), Canadian concert pianist and professor
- Maurice Paquin (born 1947), Canadian comedian and singer
- Mélanie Paquin (born 1981), Canadian beauty pageant winner
- Patricia Paquin (born 1968), Canadian actrice

== See also ==
- New France
- French Canadian
- French Canadian American
