= Germain Morin (priest) =

Germain Morin (bap. 15 January 1642 – 20 August 1702) was born in Quebec City and the first Canadian to be ordained priest.

Morin is known to have been at the Jesuit College in 1659 and to have been part of the organization and singing of masses. In that year he had the diaconate conferred on him by Bishop Laval

Morin's main contribution to the early church in New France was his execution of his duties as secretary of the bishopric of Quebec. After 1670, he served as a parish priest in a number of locations. He died at the Hôtel-Dieu de Québec.
