= Keian Uprising =

Military conflict

The Keian Uprising (慶安事件, Keian Jiken) was a failed coup d'état attempt carried out against the Tokugawa shogunate of Japan in 1651, by a number of rōnin. Though it failed, the event is historically significant as an indication of a wider problem of disgruntled rōnin throughout the country at the time. Masterminded by Yui Shōsetsu and Marubashi Chūya, the uprising is named after the Keian era in which it took place.

According to strategist Yui's plan, Marubashi would take Edo Castle, the headquarters of the shogunate, using barrels of gunpowder to begin a fire which would rage through Edo, the capital. In the confusion, with the authorities distracted by firefighting efforts, the rōnin would storm the castle and kill key high officials.

At the same time, Yui would lead a second group and seize the Tokugawa stronghold in Sunpu (modern-day city of Shizuoka). Further action was planned for Osaka Castle and Kyoto. They timed their rebellion to take advantage of the death of shōgun Tokugawa Iemitsu, as his successor, Ietsuna, was still a child. The conspirators aimed to force the shogunate to relax its policies of seizing hans and dispossessing daimyōs, which under Iemitsu had deprived tens of thousands of samurai of position and income, adding them to the ranks of rōnin.

Ultimately, however, the uprising failed when the conspirators' plan was discovered. Marubashi Chūya fell ill, and, talking through his fever dreams, revealed secrets which made their way to the authorities by the time the rebels were ready to move. Marubashi was arrested and executed in Edo; Yui Shōsetsu escaped that fate by committing seppuku, in Sunpu, upon finding himself surrounded by police. Several of the rebels committed suicide alongside him. The families of the conspirators as well were then tortured and killed by the authorities, as was usual at the time; several were crucified.

In the aftermath of the suppression of the uprising, the shogunal Elders (Rōjū) met to discuss the origins of the uprising, and how to prevent similar events from occurring in the future. Originally, most of the Elders sought to take severe measures, including expelling all rōnin from the city, but they were eventually convinced by Abe Tadaaki to take a more rational tack. He suggested reducing the number of rōnin opposed to the shogunate, not through expulsion, but by introducing more favorable policies. In particular, he convinced the council that the shogunate ought to do away with the law of escheatment, and to work to help rōnin settle into proper jobs. Forcefully expelling a great number of people from the city, he argued, would only serve to create more opposition to the government.

Far from being an isolated incident, the Keian Uprising was followed by an event the following year involving several hundred rōnin, and another soon afterwards in Sado. These were not directly related, that is, none of the persons involved were the same, nor did they follow a single leader or organized ideology. Despite this, or perhaps because of it, it is significant to note how widespread the distaste for the shogunate was at this time, and the degree of the "problem" of the rōnin throughout the country.

The tale was then retold in a novel, Keian Taiheiki (慶安太平記), and in a number of Kabuki plays, the most famous of which, also called Keian Taiheiki, was written by renowned playwright Kawatake Mokuami.
