= Anna Barbara Reinhart =

Swiss mathematician

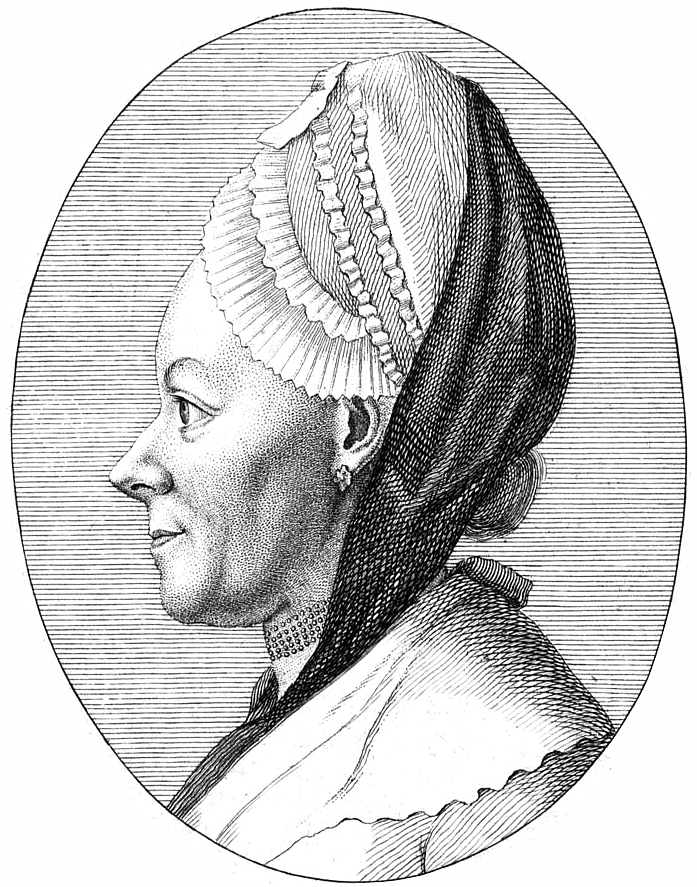
Copper engraving of Anna Reinhart

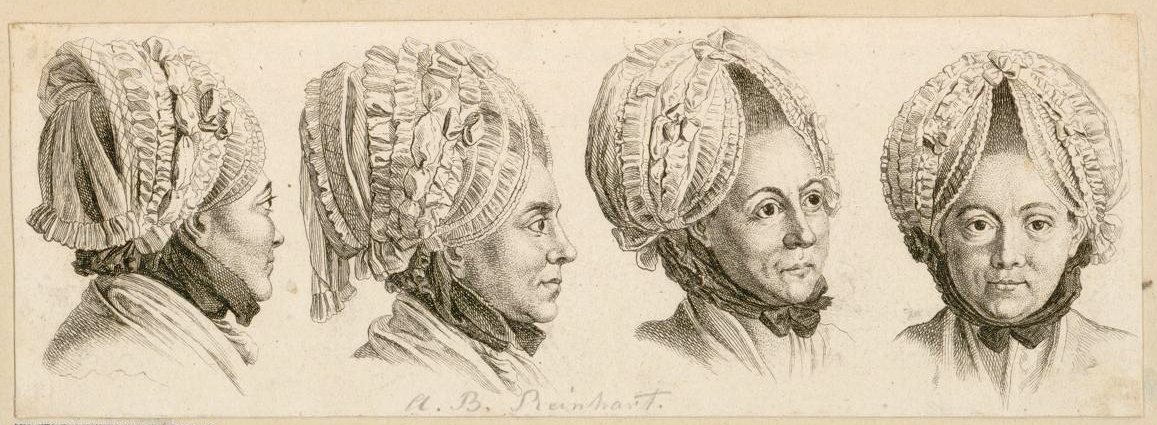
4 images of Anna Reinhart, unknown artist

Anna Barbara Reinhart (12 July 1730 – 5 January 1796), was a Swiss mathematician. She was considered an internationally respected mathematician of her era.

== Biography ==
Anna Barbara Reinhart was the third child and first daughter of Councilor Salomon Reinhart (1693 - 1761) and Anna Steiner.

Her childhood was overshadowed by an accident when she fell off her horse at a wedding party, which caused her to be confined her to her bed for significant periods of time. Her physician, Dr. Johann Heinrich Hegner, however, noticed her aptitude for mathematics and began to teach her. Henceforth, she studied mathematics using the books of Leonhard Euler, Gabriel Cramer, Pieter van Musschenbroek and Jérôme Lalande.

Reinhart corresponded with several mathematicians of the period, such as Christoph Jezler, and also received them as guests. She was active as a teacher of mathematics and was the instructor of Ulrich Hegner and Heinrich Bosshard von Rümikon among others. It is said that she edited the works of several of her contemporaries and wrote a manuscript commenting on the Philosophiae Naturalis Principia Mathematica by Isaac Newton, however her comments were lost after her death, but her letters to Christoph Jezler were preserved.

Several contemporaries commended Reinhart in their work, such as Daniel Bernoulli who praised her for expanding and improving the pursuit curve as discussed by Pierre Louis Maupertuis.

Reinhart died in 1796 at the age of 66 from gout and the consequences of her childhood accident, from which never fully recovered.

== Legacy ==
In 2003, a street was named after her in her hometown Winterthur in Zurich, Switzerland.
