= Yui Shōsetsu =

Japanese military scholar and rebel (1605–1651)

Japanese name
- Kanji: 由井 正雪 由比 正雪
Transcriptions
- Romanization: Yui Shōsetsu/Masayuki

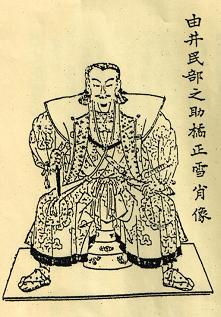
Yui Shōsetsu

Yui Shōsetsu (由井 正雪 or 由比 正雪; 1605 – September 10, 1651) was a Japanese military scholar and rōnin in the Edo period. He was one of the ringleaders of the 1651 Keian Uprising, an attempt to overthrow the Tokugawa Shogunate, but informal communication uncovered the plot and he was cornered and committed suicide. Yui was known as one of the "Three Great Rōnin" along with Kumazawa Banzan and Yamaga Sokō.

Born in Sunpu Domain to humble origins, Yui is said to have been a talented youth; he was taken in by a number of rōnin from the area, who taught him recent history, and likely swordsmanship and military strategy as well.

As an adult, he found employment as an instructor at a samurai academy, teaching swordsmanship and related disciplines. But these academies, which could be found throughout the country, served not only the pure function of schools of martial arts; certainly, discipline, ethics, and related arts were taught as well. But the schools also served as social and intellectual spaces, in which political ideas were discussed, and grievances aired in a familiar environment where comrades and friends met. Students were almost exclusively members of the samurai class, but running the full gamut of rankings, from daimyō to ronin. As regulations were made stricter at this time, and many ronin expelled from their domains, the number of students grew dramatically.

He later opened a school of military strategy and martial arts in the Renjaku-chō neighborhood of Kanda in Edo, as well as an armorer's shop and ironworks. Here he continued to gain contacts, friends, and prestige among the ronin and others; one of them was Marubashi Chūya, a samurai and fellow instructor of martial disciplines and strategy, with whom he would plan the Keian Uprising some years later.

Beginning in 1645, Yui plotted a coup against the Tokugawa shogunate along with Marubashi, a small group of rōnin, and a number of their students. It was to take place in 1651, shortly after the death of shōgun Tokugawa Iemitsu, and would later come to be known as the Keian Uprising. Unfortunately for Yui and his comrades, the plot was discovered before it truly began. Yui was in Sunpu, preparing to execute a secondary series of attacks when Marubashi was arrested in Edo; surrounded by shogunate officials, he committed seppuku rather than be captured.

Following his death, the officials performed a variety of obscenities upon his body, and then proceeded to subject his parents and other close relatives to crucifixion. Yui, though ultimately unsuccessful in his political plots, is a representative of the growing political unrest in the early Edo period, as a result of strict laws put forth, and enforced, by the shogunate. He and his conspirators were only one of many groups throughout the country meeting in samurai academies and other venues, discussing politics and current events. Most, of course, did not act upon their beliefs as Yui and Marubashi did, but that discussion existed among a great number of people, despite, or perhaps because of the shogunate's strict enforcement of its laws, is significant.

== Cultural Impact ==
Yui Shōsetsu’s legacy as a military strategist and rebel has influenced various works of fiction.

In the 2023 action RPG Fate/Samurai Remnant, Shōsetsu is reimagined as a female warrior operating a school in Edo. The game presents them as initially loyal to the Tokugawa shogunate before becoming entangled in The Waxing Moon Ritual. This depiction reflects the Fate universe’s approach to reinterpreting historical figures through a blend of history and fantasy.
