= Marubashi Chūya =

Japanese rebel (d.1651)

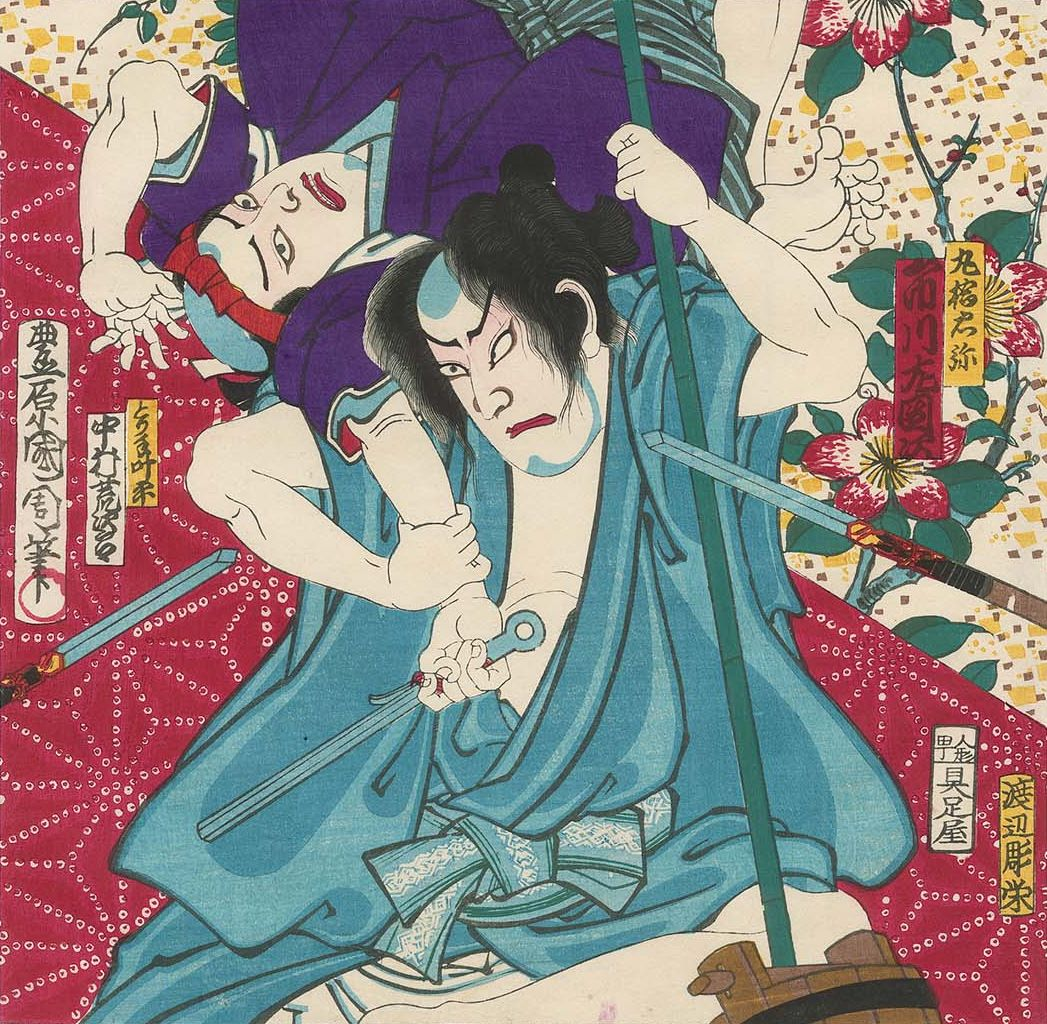
Kabuki actor Ichikawa Sadanji I playing Marubashi Chūya in Keian Taiheiki (detail of a woodblock print by Toyohara Kunichika)

Marubashi Chūya (丸橋 忠弥; died September 24, 1651) was a rōnin (masterless samurai) from Yamagata, and instructor in martial arts and military strategy, most famous for his involvement in the 1651 Keian Uprising which sought to overthrow Japan's Tokugawa shogunate. He is said to have been a man of great strength and good birth whose distaste for the shogunate stemmed primarily from a desire for revenge for the death of his father, killed by the shogunal army at the 1615 siege of Osaka. The identity of his father is not clear, but may have been Chōsokabe Motochika.

Originally a skilled student of Yagyū Shinkage-ryū, he later switched for Hōzōin-ryū, the most famous style of Sōjutsu, thus Marubashi's weapon of choice became the Jūmonji Yari, and with his skills and reputation as a martial artist, found work teaching martial arts and strategy. Marubashi met Yui Shōsetsu, later to be his partner in organizing the Keian Uprising, at the armorer shop run by the latter. At some point after 1645, the two began to plot their rebellion, which would revolve around starting a fire in the capital of Edo and using this as a distraction to allow the rebels entry into the castle.

They planned to strike shortly after the death of shōgun Tokugawa Iemitsu in 1651, but Marubashi fell quite ill at that time, and revealed secrets of the plot in his delirium. Before any part of the plot was initiated, Marubashi was arrested in Edo. Yui killed himself shortly afterwards, while Marubashi and a number of the other rebels were crucified, their families beheaded.

He is the titular figure in an 1870 kabuki play by Kawatake Mokuami also known as Keian Taiheiki.
