= Sally Basset =

Bermudian slave

Sarah "Sally" Bassett, also known as Sary, was an enslaved African woman from Bermuda. She was declared guilty and burned at the stake in June 1730 for the poisoning of three individuals. Her notoriety has influenced Bermudian history and cultural heritage.

== Life ==
Sarah Bassett was a mixed-race woman and raised many grandchildren. In 1713 she was found guilty of killing livestock and was whipped through the parish. Prior to 1727 she was owned by a Southampton blacksmith, Francis Dickinson of Pembroke Parish. Dickinson died around 1726, leaving Bassett for his children to inherit. In 1729, she was valued as useless because of her age, but she continued to practice her medicinal skills in Southampton Parish.

During the late 1720s, Bermuda's elite began making claims of being victims of poison attacks by their slaves. In 1730, Thomas Foster, his spouse Sarah Foster, and a household slave, Nancey, were taken ill. On 2 June, the investigation of Sarah Bassett began, possibly Bermuda's most notorious case pertaining to an attempted murder of a slaveholder by a slave.

On 18 December 1729, about six months prior to the illnesses of Thomas and Sarah Foster and Nancey, Bassett visited her granddaughter, Beck, at her slaveholders home, the Fosters. According to the trial records, Bassett had various substances on her that contained several types of poisons including ratsbane, manchineel root, and a white substance known as 'white toade'. She gave Beck specific instructions on what exactly to do with these substances to poison the Fosters and Nancey. One substance was to be hidden in the kitchen for Nancey to inhale and the other in the Fosters' food for an extended period of time. Nancey subsequently discovered the hidden poison and told the Fosters.

On 1 June 1730, Bassett's trial began in St. George's Sessions or State House. Beck and ten white citizens of Bermuda, including one of the victims, Sarah Foster, testified against Bassett. Beck stated that Sarah had made her give them the poison. Bassett denied the charges but was declared guilty of attempted murder on and sentenced to be burned alive, while Beck was exonerated. The Chief Justice asked Bassett for any statement that could change her sentence and she stated that she never deserved it. He responded, "you are to be conveyed to the place of execution where a pile of wood is to be made and provided, and you are there to be fastened to a sufficient stake and there to be burnt with fire until your body be dead." The execution took place at Crow Lane, a busy intersection by Hamilton Harbour. On her way there, she reportedly said to the crowd: "No use you hurrying folks, there'll be no fun 'til I get there!"

About two weeks after the Sarah Bassett trial, on 23 June, An Act for the Further and Better Regulating Negroes and other Slaves and for the more Effectual and Speedy Way of Prosecuting Them was created by the Bermuda Assembly to have more regulation and control over 'negroes and other slaves'.

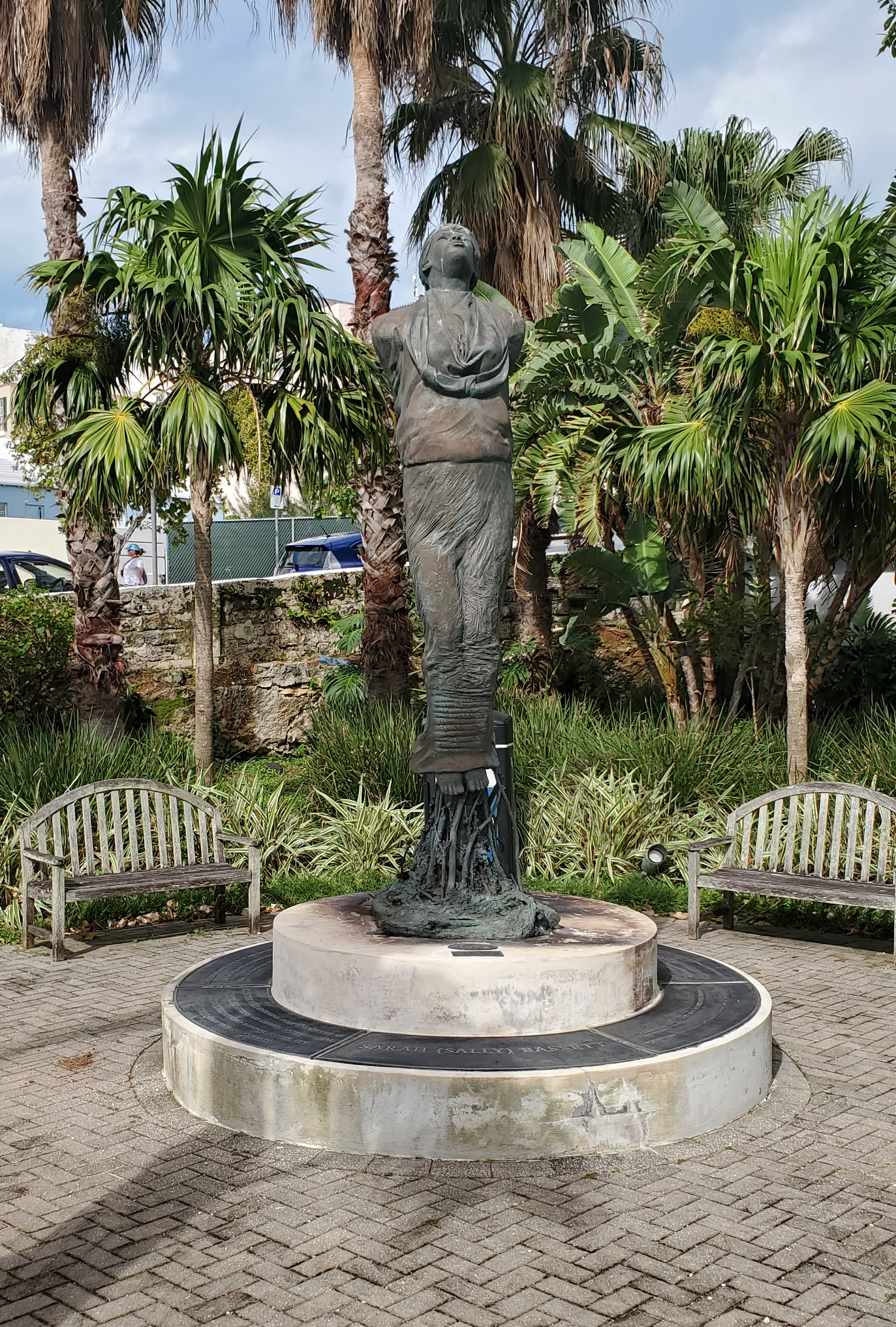
Statue of Sally Basset in the City of Hamilton, Bermuda

== Legacy ==
Sally Bassett's notorious act and the burning of her live body became a part of the islands' folklore and local history. Legend says that when the remains of the stake was cleared, a purple flower (the "Bermudiana", a New World iris of the genus Sisyrinchium) was found growing from her ashes; before her death Sarah had declared that there would be a sign that she was guiltless and today the flower blooms across Bermuda. Her burning execution led to very hot days in Bermuda being referred to as 'a Sally Basset day'.

A historian at the University of the West Indies has suggested that news of the poisoning inspired slave rebellions throughout the West Indies.

The government of Bermuda commissioned Carlos Dowling to create a statue of Basset, as the nation's first memorial to an enslaved person. Despite some controversy about its placement, a ten-foot statue of Bassett was unveiled on the Cabinet office grounds in 2008.

== See also ==
- List of enslaved people
