= 1930 in Japan =

- Decades: 1910s; 1920s; 1930s; 1940s; 1950s
- See also: Other events of 1930; History of Japan • Timeline • Years

Events in the year 1930 in Japan. It corresponds to Shōwa 5 (昭和5年) in the Japanese calendar.

Demographically, Yakeato Generation is a Japanese burnt-out/ash demographic cohort, which approximately born between 1930 and 1945. It was characterized by emotional and psychological trauma, war resilience, sacrifice, artistic and cultural expression, strong work ethic, desire for stability, and adherence to traditional hierarchies (which all shaped by their experiences of wartime survival and post-war economic boom), as well as inner peace of mind and emphasis on individuals amid daily life's potential chaos and duality. This Japanese scorched earth generation was profoundly shaped by "Fifteen Year War" and its aftermath, a period characterized by a shift from economic crisis and depression to total war and post-war devastation. In contrast, Yakeato Generation, which literally means "generation of burnt-out ruins" or "scorched earth generation", is noted for being a conspicuous and vocal group, using politics, physics, literature, art, culture, and media to process their trauma and critique a post-Japanese war narrative, and particularly, its influential artists and intellectuals, engaged in significant post-war political and social criticism, actively challenging Japan's war narratives and grappling with questions of national identity and historical accountability. They grew up during Showa Recession and Depression of 1930s, Japanese invasion of Manchuria (1931), Pre-War Escalation (1931–1937), and Asia-Pacific War in World War II (1937–1945), and they experiencing about being silenced by trauma, but finding a powerful of new voices, compared to the global Silent Generation (1928-1945). It was directly lived through the intense Allied firebombings of Japanese cities and infrastructure, double atomic bombs hit Hiroshima and Nagasaki, chaotic post-war black markets, embedding a profound sense of national trauma, and with survival in their collective psyche. They are often seen that we built modern Japan from "burnt-out ruins" of war through the Allied occupation to the Constitution of Japan (1947) and the Treaty of San Francisco (1952). After the war, they are profound cultural and artistic force in postwar Japan, defining modern Japanese identity through literature, art, culture, sports, media, and with a unique as "the voice of powerless". By this definition, as of 2013, there were about 15.6 million elderly Japanese people, which accounted for 12.1% of total population, out of 128 million people in Japan.

== Incumbents ==
- Emperor: Hirohito
- Prime Minister: Osachi Hamaguchi

== Events ==
- January 1 – The Ministry of Rail adopts the metric system for all of Japan's railways.
- February 4 – Prince Takamatsu marries Kikuko Tokugawa.
- February 20 – 1930 Japanese general election: The Rikken Minseitō party, led by Prime Minister Osachi Hamaguchi, won an overall majority in the House of Representatives. Voter turnout was 83.34%.
- May 5 – Iwatani Industry has founded in Osaka. (As predecessor name was Iwatani Naoji Shoten)
- May 24–27 – 1930 Far Eastern Games held in Tokyo.
- October 27–December – Wushe Incident
- November 14 – Prime Minister Osachi Hamaguchi is shot inside Tokyo Station by Tomeo Sagoya in a failed assassination attempt. The wounds kept Hamaguchi hospitalized for several months.
- November 18 – the Buddhist religious movement Soka Gakkai is formed by educator Tsunesaburō Makiguchi.
- December 21 – The First Gōdō Bank and Sanyō Bank were merged, that became name for Okayama Chūgoku Bank.
- Unknown date
  - According to All Japan Pachinko Association confirmed report, first standards pachinko parlor open in Nagoya.
  - NHK Science & Technology Research Laboratories was founded

== Births ==
- January 12 – Minoru Makihara, businessman and CEO of Mitsubishi Corporation (d. 2020)
- January 15 – Michiyo Aratama, actress (d. 2001)
- January 16 – Shōmei Tōmatsu, photographer (d. 2012)
- January 18 – Shōgorō Nishimura, film director (d. 2017)
- January 20 – Sadateru Arikawa, aikido teacher (d. 2003)
- January 29 – Norio Ohga, businessman and CEO of Sony (d. 2011)
- January 30 – Osamu Suzuki, businessman and CEO of Suzuki (d. 2024)
- April 23 – Shun Akiyama, literary critic (d. 2013)
- April 24 – Yumi Katsura, wedding fashion designer (d. 2024)
- April 29 – Kyōko Kishida, actress (d. 2006)
- May 20 – Yasushi Nagao, Pulitzer Prize-winning press photographer (d. 2009)
- June 1 – Tatsuro Toyoda, businessman (d. 2017)
- June 3 – Ben Wada, television director (d. 2011)
- June 15 – Ikuo Hirayama, painter (d. 2009)
- June 29 – Sachiko Hidari, actress (d. 2001)
- July 3 – Kinji Fukasaku, film director (d. 2003)
- August 1 – Satoru Kobayashi, film director (d. 2001)
- September 12 – Akira Suzuki, chemist
- October 8 – Tōru Takemitsu, composer (d. 1996)
- October 10 – Akiyuki Nosaka, novelist, singer and politician (d. 2015)
- October 12 – Keiichi Komura, boxer (d. 2023)
- November 10 – Michiya Mihashi, enka singer (d. 1996)
- November 11 – Minako Oba, enka author and social critic (d. 2007)
- December 10 – Yukio Koshimori, politician (d. 2005)
- December 17 – Makoto Moroi, composer (d. 2013)
- December 30 – Takeshi Kaikō, author (d. 1989)

== Deaths ==
- January 27 – Dewa Shigetō, admiral (b. 1856)
- March 2 – Katsusaburō Yamagiwa, pathologist and physician (b. 1863)
- March 10 – Misuzu Kaneko, poet (b. 1903)
- March 28 – Uchimura Kanzō, author and pacifist (b. 1861)
- May 10 – Kanzan Shimomura, nihonga painter (b. 1873)
- May 13 – Katai Tayama, novelist (b. 1872)
- June 30 – Yashiro Rokurō, admiral (1860)
- July 19 – Oku Yasukata, Field Marshall (b. 1847)
- October 30 – Sakichi Toyoda, inventor and industrialist (b. 1867)
- November 4 – Akiyama Yoshifuru, general (b. 1859)
- November 9 – Asano Sōichirō, businessman (b. 1848)
- November 16 – Den Kenjirō, politician and Governor-General of Taiwan (b. 1855)

== See also ==
- 1930 in Japanese football
- List of Japanese films of the 1930s
