= 1617 in Japan =

- Decades: 1590s; 1600s; 1610s; 1620s; 1630s
- See also: Other events of 1617; History of Japan • Timeline • Years

Events of the year 1617 in Japan.

== Incumbents ==
- Monarch: Go-Mizunoo
- Shogun: Tokugawa Hidetada

== Events ==
- Amagasaki Castle is rebuilt by Toda Ujikane.
- July: 1616 Japanese expedition to Taiwan: Several Japanese ships return to Nagasaki after having plundered several villages of Đại Việt.
- September 25: Emperor emeritus Go-Yōzei dies. He is buried in the Fukakusa no kita no Misasagi in Kyoto.

== Births ==
- June 2: Maeda Toshitsugu, first daimyo of Toyama Domain (d.1674)

== Deaths ==
- September 25: Emperor Go-Yōzei, emperor (1586-1611) (b.1571)
