= 1615 in Japan =

- Decades: 1590s; 1600s; 1610s; 1620s; 1630s
- See also: Other events of 1615; History of Japan • Timeline • Years

Events of the year 1615 in Japan.

== Incumbents ==
- Monarch: Go-Mizunoo
- Shogun: Tokugawa Hidetada

== Events ==
- January 8: Siege of Osaka: Tokugawa Ieyasu orders a limited bombing of Osaka Castle.
- January 15: Siege of Osaka: As a result of Sanada Yukimura's fortifications to Osaka Castle, an impressed Ieyasu attempts to convince Yukimura to change sides. Yukimura refuses, causing Ieyasu to bribe a commander named Nanjo Tadashige, though Tadashige's defection is discovered and he is beheaded.
- January 16: Siege of Osaka: Ban Naotsugu carries out a defensive attack on Hachisuka Yoshishige troops, killing several before retreating.
- January 17: Siege of Osaka: Ieyasu sends Honda Masazumi and Lady Acha to meet Kyōgoku Tadataka for a potential peace treaty. The treaty's terms include allowing Toyotomi Hideyori to keep Osaka as his domain in exchange for some hostages as loyalty.
- January 22: Siege of Osaka: A peace treaty is signed between Tokugawa Ieyasu and Toyotomi Hideyori. The castle's moat is filled, and several children are taken as a sign of loyalty. The castle's walls and exterior defenses are also dismantled.
- January 24: Siege of Osaka: Ieyasu departs Osaka Castle to return to Edo.
- January 28: Siege of Osaka: Ieyasu informs Emperor Go-Mizunoo that the Siege of Osaka has come to an end.
- January 30: Hasekura Tsunenaga's diplomatic mission meets King Philip III of Spain to offer a treaty.
- February 17: Hasekura Tsunenaga is baptized and receives the baptismal name Felipe Francisco Hasekura.
- March 13: Siege of Osaka: Tokugawa Hidetada, the ruling shogun, arrives in Osaka to oversee the dismantling of Osaka Castle's exterior defenses as per the peace treaty. However, news emerges of Hideyori attempting to enlist rōnin to his services in violation of the treaty, causing Ieyasu to demand Hideyori to abandon Osaka.
- March 14: Siege of Osaka: Ieyasu issues an edict banning all rice imports to Osaka, this causes internal divisions within the Toyotomi clan, with the clan unable to properly pay the many rōnin.
- March 15: Siege of Osaka: Although Hideyori attempts to leave Osaka, the rōnin under his service threaten to commit suicide and vow to keep fighting the shogunate, preventing Hideyori from leaving.
- May 3: Siege of Osaka: Ieyasu leaves his home in Shizuoka to go to Nagoya to attend the wedding of his ninth son on May 11. While in Nagoya, he is informed of the disunity within the Toyotomi clan and in Osaka Castle.
- May 21: Siege of Osaka: Ieyasu and Hidetada ready their troops to invade Osaka to punish Hideyori.
- May 26: Siege of Osaka: Toyotomi forces sustain heavy losses at the Battle of Kashii, with general Ban Danemon being killed in the process.
- June 3: Siege of Osaka: Battle of Tennōji: Hideyori plans a hammer-and-anvil operation against Tokugawa forces. Sanada Yukimura launches a head-on assault against Tokugawa forces, successfully managing to break through the defenses, briefly causing them to flee. However, the Tokugawa forces resume fighting, and Yukimura is killed by the enemy soldiers who outnumber his forces. Yukimura's death demoralizes the troops.
- June 4: Siege of Osaka: Battle of Osaka: Osaka Castle is set ablaze as Tokugawa forces surround and bombard it. Hideyori and his mother Yodo-dono commit seppuku in the burning castle to avoid capture as Hideyori's son Toyotomi Kunimatsu is captured, ending the Toyotomi clan, and ensuring Tokugawa control over the rest of Japan for the next two hundred fifty years.
- June 19: Toyotomi Kunimatsu is executed by the Tokugawa shogunate.
- July 7: Shogun Tokugawa Hidetada proclaims the Buke shohatto to an assembly of daimyo in Edo, a 19-section legal code of conduct for daimyo and their responsibilities to the shogunate.
- September 20: Hasekura Tsunenaga's diplomatic mission reaches the Papal States and visit Rome; they are received by Cardinal Burgecio.
- November 3: Hasekura Tsunenaga's diplomatic mission are received by Pope Paul V. The diplomats present a request to trade between the Papal States and Japan.
- Date unknown: Konoike Shinroku opens an office in Osaka, and begins shipping tax-rice from western Japan to Osaka.

== Deaths ==
- February 3: Justo Takayama, Catholic daimyo and samurai (b.1552)
- June 2:
  - Kuwana Yoshinari, samurai and retainer of the Toyotomi clan (b.1551)
  - Kimura Shigenari, samurai and retainer of the Toyotomu clan (b.1593)
- June 3:
  - Hattori Masanari, samurai, ninja, and retainer of the Tokugawa clan (b.1565)
  - Sanada Yukimura, samurai and commander (b.1567)
- June 4:
  - Ujiie Yukihiro, samurai and daimyo. (b.1546)
  - Toyotomi Hideyori, head of the Toyotomi clan, son of Toyotomi Hideyoshi. (b.1593)
  - Yodo-dono, wife of Toyotomi Hideyoshi. (b.1569)
- June 19: Toyotomi Kunimatsu, son of Toyotomi Hideyori. (b.1608)
- June 23: Mashita Nagamori, lord of Koriyama Castle (1585-1600) (b.1545)
