= 1871 in Japan =

- Decades: 1850s; 1860s; 1870s; 1880s; 1890s
- See also: Other events of 1871; History of Japan • Timeline • Years

Events in the year 1871 in Japan.

== Incumbents ==
- Monarch: Emperor Meiji

=== Governors ===
- Aomori Prefecture: Hiromichi Noda (September 7-November 5), J. Hishida (starting November 7)
- Fukui Prefecture: Kotobuki Murata
- Fukushima Prefecture: Tomoharu Kiyooka
- Gifu Prefecture: Joren Hasegawa
- Gunma Prefecture: Sada Aoyama
- Hiroshima Prefecture: Kono Toshikama (August 15-November 15), Senbon Hisanobu (November 15-November 27), Kono Toshikama (November 27-December 26), Date Muneoki (starting December 26)
- Ibaraki Prefecture:
  - July 13-December 9: Tesshu Yamaoka
  - starting December 9: Yamaguchi (starting November 2)
- Iwate Prefecture: Korekiyo Shima (starting November 2)
- Kagawa Prefecture: Mohei Hayashi (starting November 15)
- Kochi Prefecture: Yuzo Hayashi (starting November 15)
- Kyoto Prefecture: Nobuatsu
- Nagano Prefecture: Takaishi Wado (until 1871), Tachiki Kenzen (starting November 20)
- Niigata Prefecture: Hirimatsu (starting November 20)
- Oita Prefecture: Kei Morishita (starting November 14)
- Osaka Prefecture: Yotsutsuji Nishi
- Saga Prefecture: Sadao Koga (starting November 14)
- Saitama Prefecture: Morihide Nomura (starting November 13)
- Shiname Prefecture: Masami Terada (starting November 14)
- Tochigi Prefecture: Miki Nabeshima (starting November 13)
- Tokyo: Osamu Mibo (until September 7), Yuri Kousei (starting September 7)
- Toyama Prefecture:
  - until August: Earl Maeda
  - August-December: Obata Nobutomo
- Yamagata Prefecture: ......

== Events ==
- January 28 – Japan's first Japanese-language daily newspaper, the Yokohama Mainichi Shinbun, is printed in Yokohama. (Traditional Japanese Date: Eighth Day of the Twelfth Month, Meiji 3)
- June 27 – The yen becomes the country's national currency.
