= 70 in Japan =

- Decades
- See also: Other events of 70; History of Japan; Timeline; Years

Events in the year 70 in Japan.

== Incumbents ==
- Monarch: Emperor Suinin

== Deaths ==
- Date unknown – Emperor Suinin dies at about age 138
