= World war =

War involving major global states

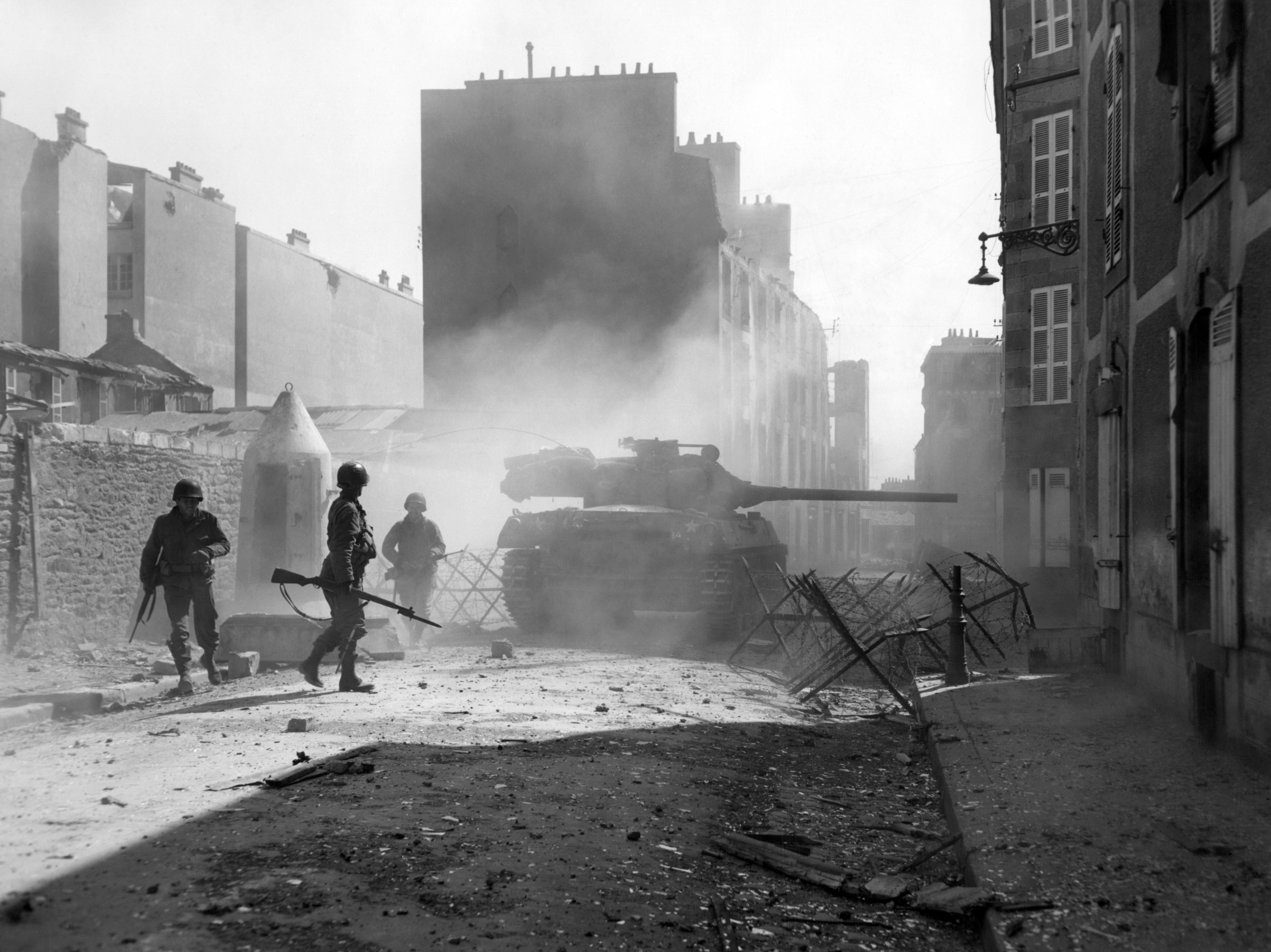
United States Army infantry supported by a M18 tank destroyer advancing through a German-occupied Brest, France, during World War II

A world war is an international conflict that involves most or all of the world's major powers. Conventionally, the term is reserved for the two major international conflicts that occurred during the first half of the 20th century: World War I (1914–1918) and World War II (1939–1945). Some historians have also characterized other global conflicts as world wars, such as the Seven Years' War, the French Revolutionary and Napoleonic Wars, Cold War, and the war on terror.

== Etymology ==
The Oxford English Dictionary had cited the first known usage in the English language to a Scottish newspaper, The People's Journal, in 1848: "A war among the great powers is now necessarily a world-war." The term "world war" is used by Karl Marx and his associate, Friedrich Engels, in a series of articles published around 1850 called The Class Struggles in France. Rasmus B. Anderson in 1889 described an episode in Teutonic mythology as a "world war" (Swedish: världskrig), justifying this description by a line in an Old Norse epic poem, "Völuspá: folcvig fyrst I heimi" ("The first great war in the world"). German writer August Wilhelm Otto Niemann used the term "world war" in the title of his anti-British novel, Der Weltkrieg: Deutsche Träume (The World War: German Dreams) in 1904, published in English as The Coming Conquest of England.

The term "first world war" was first used in September 1914 by German biologist and philosopher Ernst Haeckel, who claimed that "there is no doubt that the course and character of the feared 'European War' ... will become the first world war in the full sense of the word", citing a wire service report in the Indianapolis Star on 20 September 1914. In English, the term "First World War" was used by Lieutenant Colonel Charles à Court Repington as the title of his memoirs, published in 1920; he had previously noted his discussion on the matter with a Major Johnstone of Harvard University in his diary entry of September 10, 1918.

The term "World War I" was coined by Time magazine on page 28 of its June 12, 1939, issue. In the same article, on page 32, the term "World War II" was first used speculatively to describe the upcoming war. The first use for the actual war came in its issue of September 11, 1939. One week earlier, on September 4, the day after France and the United Kingdom declared war on Germany, the Danish newspaper Kristeligt Dagblad used the term on its front page, saying "The Second World War broke out yesterday at 11 a.m."

Speculative fiction authors had been noting the concept of a Second World War in 1919 and 1920, when Milo Hastings wrote his dystopian novel, City of Endless Night.

Other languages have also adopted the "world war" terminology; for example, in French, "world war" is translated as guerre mondiale; in German, Weltkrieg (which, prior to the war, had been used in the more abstract meaning of a global conflict); in Italian, guerra mondiale; in Spanish and Portuguese, guerra mundial; in Danish and Norwegian, verdenskrig; in Polish wojna światowa; in Russian, мировая война (mirovaya voyna); and in Finnish, maailmansota.

== History ==
=== First World War ===
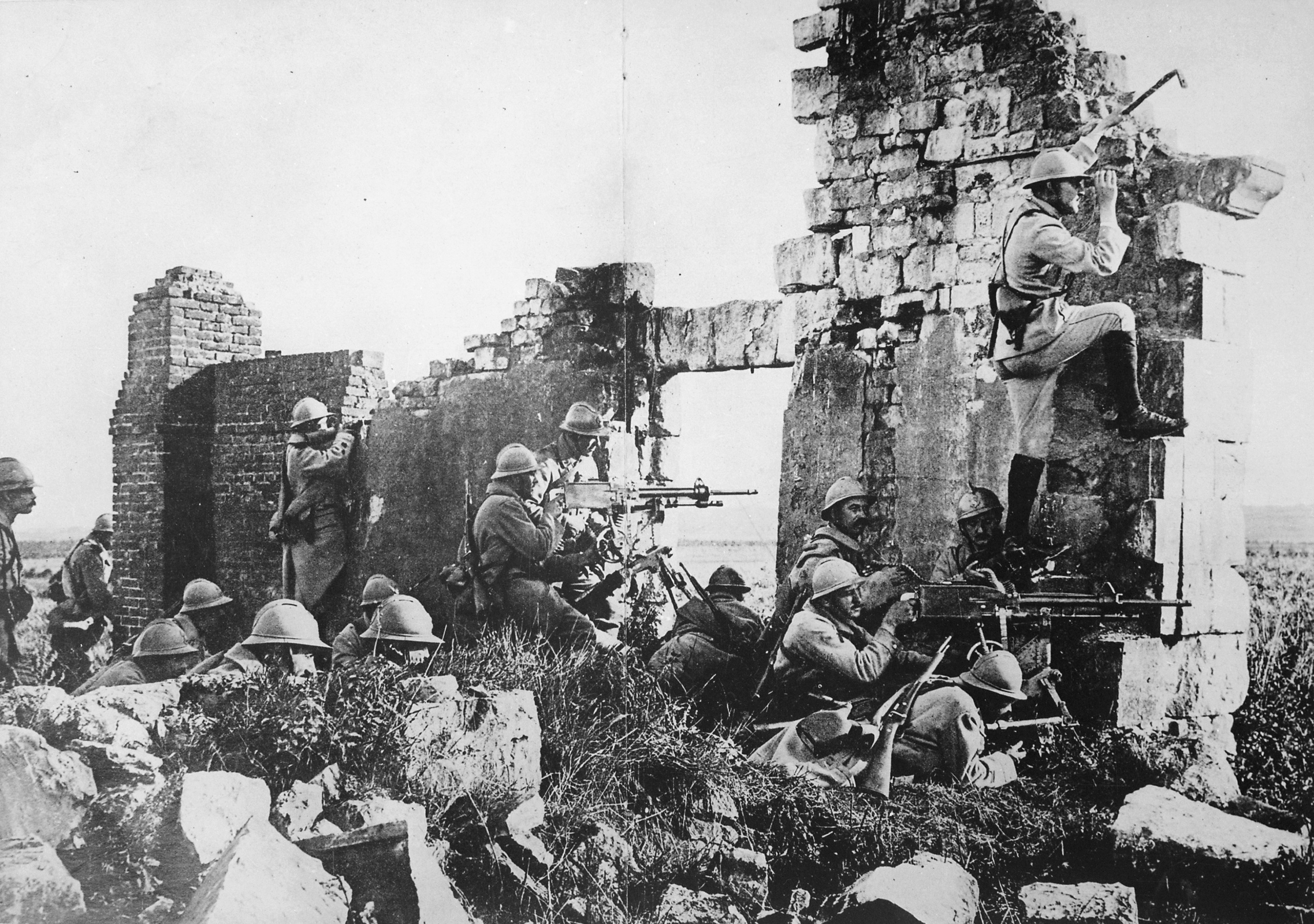
French Army soldiers holding a position in the ruins of a church during the Second Battle of the Marne, part of World War I

The First World War occurred from 1914 to 1918. In terms of human technological history, the scale of World War I was enabled by the technological advances of the Second Industrial Revolution and the resulting globalization that allowed global power projection and mass production of military hardware. It had been recognized that the complex system of opposing military alliances (the German and Austro-Hungarian Empires against the British, Italian, Russian, and French Empires) was likely, if war broke out, to lead to a worldwide conflict. That caused a very minute conflict between two countries to have the potential to set off a domino effect of alliances, triggering a world war. The fact that the powers involved had large overseas empires virtually guaranteed that such a war would be worldwide, as the colonies' resources would be a crucial strategic factor. The same strategic considerations also ensured that the combatants would strike at each other's colonies, thus spreading the wars far more widely than those of pre-Columbian times.

War crimes were perpetrated in World War I. Chemical weapons were used in the war despite the Hague Conventions of 1899 and 1907 having outlawed the use of such weapons in warfare. The Ottoman Empire was responsible for the Armenian genocide, during the First World War, as well as other war crimes.

=== Second World War ===
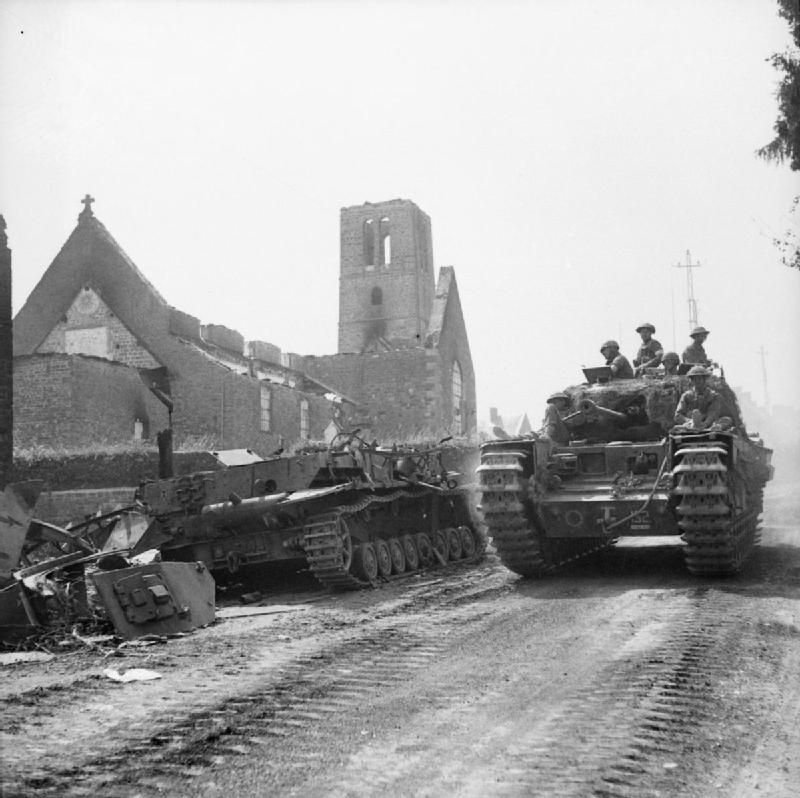
A British Army Churchill tank passing a destroyed Wehrmacht Panzer IV tank during Operation Overlord, part of World War II

The Second World War occurred from 1939 to 1945 and is the only conflict in which nuclear weapons have been used; both Hiroshima and Nagasaki, in the Empire of Japan, were devastated by atomic bombs dropped by the United States. The main Axis powers were Nazi Germany, the Empire of Japan, and the Kingdom of Italy; while the United Kingdom, the United States, the Soviet Union and China were the "Big Four" Allied powers. Nazi Germany, led by Adolf Hitler, was responsible for genocides, most notably the Holocaust, which murdered demographics considered Untermensch by the Nazis. These included about six million Jews and about five million others, such as Slavs, Roma, homosexuals, and the physically and mentally disabled. The United States, the Soviet Union, and Canada deported and interned minority groups within their own borders and, largely because of the conflict, many ethnic Germans were later expelled from Eastern Europe. Japan was responsible for attacking neutral nations without a declaration of war, such as the attack on Pearl Harbor. It is also known for its brutal treatment and killing of Allied prisoners of war and the inhabitants of Asia. It also used Asians as forced laborers. The Nanjing War Crimes Tribunal found that more than 300,000 civillians and prisoners of war were murdered during the Nanjing Massacre. Noncombatants suffered at least as badly as or worse than the combatants, and the distinction between combatants and noncombatants was often blurred by the belligerents of total war in both conflicts.

The outcome of the war had a profound effect on the course of world history. The old European empires collapsed or they were dismantled as a direct result of the crushing costs of the war and in some cases, their fall was caused by the defeat of imperial powers. The United States became firmly established as the dominant global superpower, along with its close competitor and ideological foe, the Soviet Union. The two superpowers exerted political influence over most of the world's nation-states for decades after the end of the Second World War. The modern international security, economic, and diplomatic system was created in the aftermath of the war.

Institutions such as the United Nations were established to collectivize international affairs, with the explicit goal of preventing another outbreak of general war. The wars had also greatly changed the course of daily life. Technologies developed during wartime had a profound effect on peacetime life as well, such as through advances in jet aircraft, penicillin, nuclear energy, and electronic computers.

== Hypothetical third world war ==
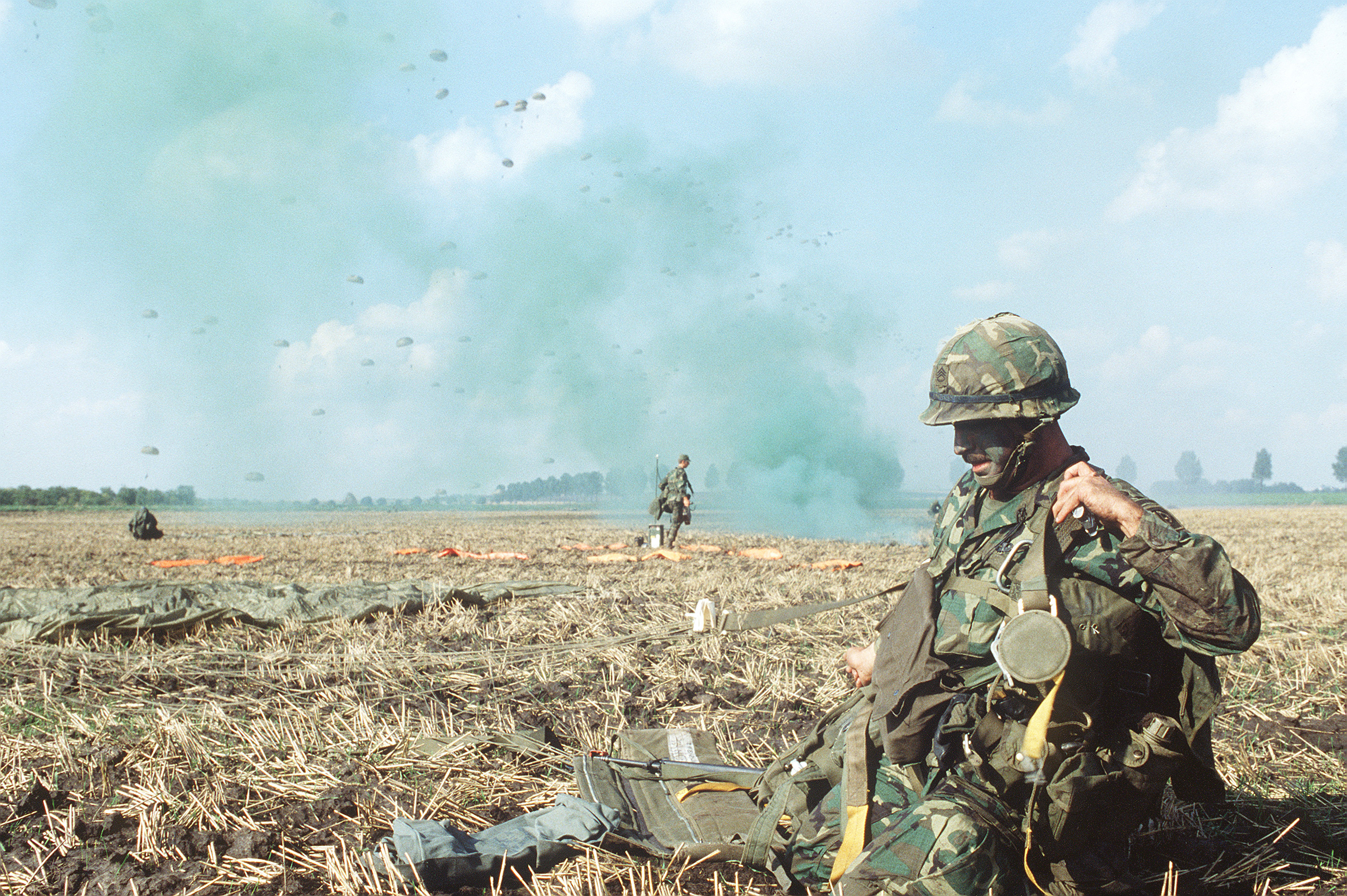
U.S. Army paratroopers landing in a field in West Germany during Exercise Reforger 1984, a Cold War-era NATO military exercise used to prepare for potential conventional warfare against the Warsaw Pact; such a conflict was expected to be World War III.

Since the atomic bombings of Hiroshima and Nagasaki during the Second World War, there has been a widespread and prolonged fear of a potential third world war between nuclear-armed powers. It is often suggested that it would become a nuclear war, and be more devastating and violent than both the First and Second World Wars. Albert Einstein is often quoted as having said in 1947 "I know not with what weapons World War III will be fought, but World War IV will be fought with sticks and stones." It has been anticipated and planned for by military and civil authorities, and it has also been explored in fiction. Scenarios have ranged from conventional warfare to limited or total nuclear warfare.

Various former government officials, politicians, authors, and military leaders (including James Woolsey, Alexandre de Marenches, Eliot Cohen, and Subcomandante Marcos) have attempted to apply the labels of the "Third World War" and the "Fourth World War" to various past and present global wars since the end of the Second World War, such as the Cold War and the war on terror respectively.

During the early 21st century, the ongoing armed conflicts that are taking place around the world, and their worldwide spillovers are sometimes described as proxy wars waged by the United States and Russia, which led some commentators to characterize the situation as a "proto-world war", with many countries embroiled in overlapping conflicts.

== Other global conflicts ==
Throughout history there have been wars and conquests that were wide ranging, engulfing whole regions and beyond (so-called "central wars"), at times creating empires which spanned multiple continents, such as through the Mongol conquest. The creation of global maritime empires, as through European colonialism, has been characterized as global conquest, but only the wars between the resulting empires (so-called great powers) have been considered global wars, giving rise to a world wide understanding of conflict and war.

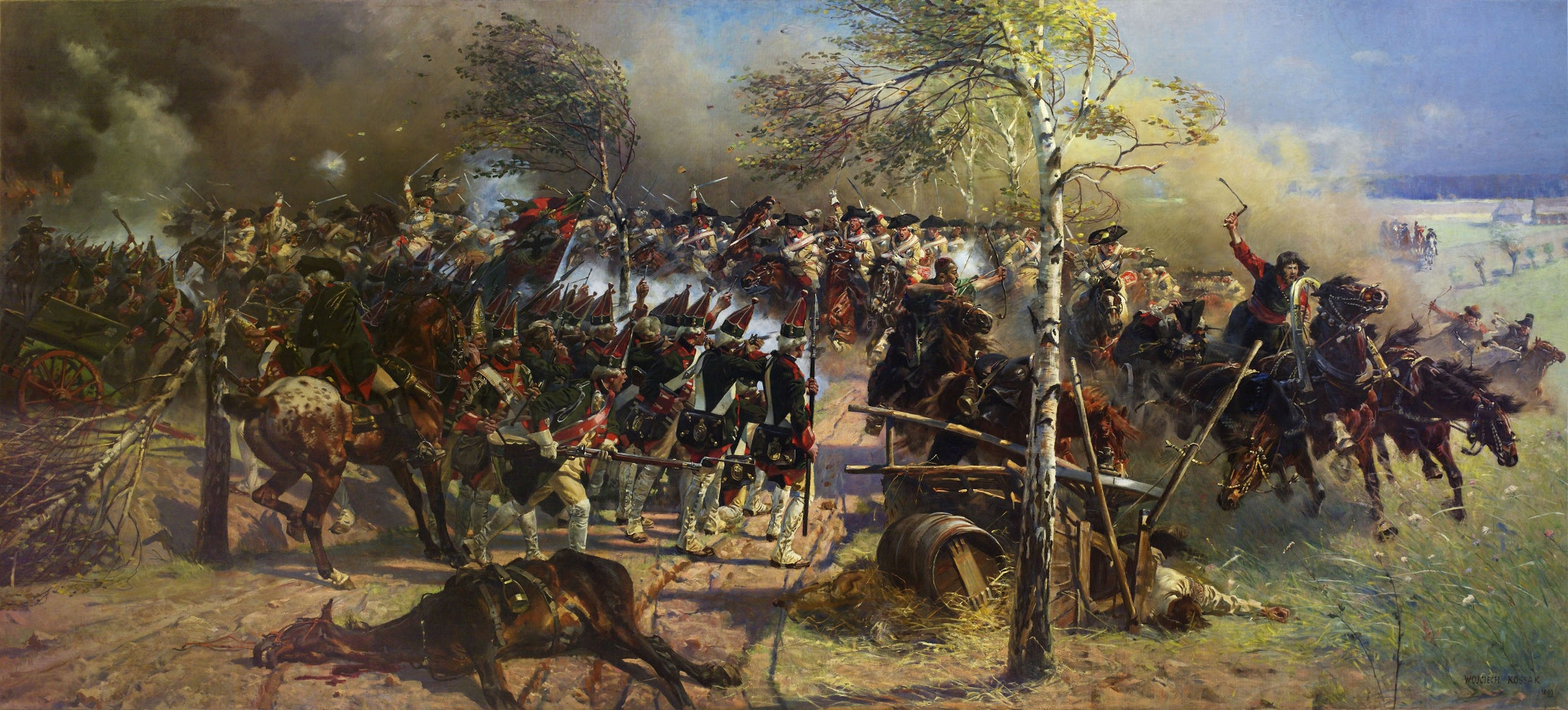
An artist's depiction of the Prussian Army clashing with the Imperial Russian Army at the Battle of Zorndorf, part of the Seven Years' War, which some historians consider to be an early world war

The Seven Years' War (1756–1763) was fought across all of North America, Europe, Asia, Africa, and South America. Most of the great powers of the era participated, notably including the British Empire and French Empire, but polities from many continents played important roles. As a result, some historians describe it as the first global conflict, or as a world war.

Historians like Richard F. Hamilton and Holger H. Herwig created a list of eight world wars, including the two generally agreed-upon world wars, the Seven Years' War, and five others: the Nine Years' War (1689–1697), the War of the Spanish Succession (1701–1714), the War of the Austrian Succession (1740–1748), the French Revolutionary Wars (1792–1802), and the Napoleonic Wars (1803–1815). British historian John Robert Seeley dubbed all of those wars between France and Great Britain (later the UK) between 1689 and 1815 (including the American Revolutionary War from 1775 to 1783) as the Second Hundred Years' War, echoing an earlier period of conflict between France and England known as the Hundred Years' War (1337–1453). Some writers have referred to the American Revolutionary War alone as a world war. Others (like William R. Thompson or Chase-Dunn and Sokolovsky) also include the Italian Wars and Dutch wars (Dutch-Spanish and Anglo-Dutch Wars) as part of Global Wars, while classifying WW1 and WW2 as the Global German Wars, and the Coalition Wars with Wars of Louis XIV as the 2nd and 1st Global French Wars. However, other historians prefer to see all of those conflicts as "Hegemonic Wars" or "General Wars", being inter-regional wars on a grand scale, but not worldly.

Others consider that the Ottoman–Portuguese confrontations and Ottoman–Habsburg wars can be considered as world conflicts, prototypes of the "Great Game" in Eurasia and the Scramble for Africa, but between two main power-projecting and religious blocs, the Ottomans, as holders of the Muslim Caliphate, and the Habsburgs, as Holy Roman Emperor. Also has been argued that a Catholic-Muslim Global War hadn't started in the clash between Charles V and Suleiman the Magnificent aspirations of Universal powers, but before within the Spanish–Ottoman wars in late Reconquista, due to Catholic Monarchs of Spain's attempt to attack Turks and Mamluks (supporters of Emirate of Granada) in Asia from an circumnavigate expedition to the East Indies (which was the original intentions of Columbus' voyages and of Magellan-Elcano), while also attacking them in Mediterranean Europe and North Africa, aspiring to lead a Global Crusade and Two-front war against the Ottomans.

However, the Americas and Oceania were not involved in those conflicts, in which case, other historians consider the Thirty Years' War and Eighty Years' War (specially Iberian–Dutch War) as the first global conflict, pitting the Spanish and Portuguese Empires against the French, Dutch and British Empires and their allies (mostly Protestants, like Danish and Swedish oversea expeditions) across the five continents.

Another possible example is the Second Congo War (1998–2003) even though it was only waged on one continent. It involved nine nations and led to ongoing low-intensity warfare despite official peace and the first democratic elections in 2006. It has been referred to as "Africa's World War". Similarly, other historians suggest even earlier conflicts to be world wars. For example, Russian ethnologist L. N. Gumilyov called the Byzantine–Sasanian War of 602–628 "the World War of the 7th century" because it evolved into a war between the fourfold informal alliance of the Chinese Empire, the Western Turkic Khaganate, the Khazars, and the Byzantine Empire against a triple union of the Sasanian Empire, the Avars, and the Eastern Turkic Khaganate, with proxy conflicts in Afro-Eurasia (like the Greco–Persian Wars) and across the Old World.

Number	Event	Casualties lowest estimate	Casualties highest estimate	Location	From	To	Duration (years)
1	Thirty Years' War			Europe, North America, South America, Asia, Africa	1618	1648	30
2	Nine Years' War	680,000		Europe, North America, South America, Asia	1688	1697	9
3	War of the Spanish Succession	700,000	1,251,000	Europe, North America, South America, Africa	1701	1714	13
4	War of the Austrian Succession	359,000		Europe, North America, South America, Asia	1740	1748	8
5	Seven Years' War	992,000	1,500,000	Europe, North America, South America, Africa, Asia	1756	1763	7
6	American Revolutionary War	217,000	262,000	North America, Gibraltar, Balearic Islands, Asia, Africa, Caribbean Sea, Atlantic Ocean, Indian Ocean	1775	1783	8
7	French Revolutionary Wars	663,000		Europe, Egypt, Middle East, Atlantic Ocean, Caribbean, Indian Ocean	1792	1802	10
8	Napoleonic Wars	1,800,000	7,000,000	Europe, Atlantic Ocean, Mediterranean Sea, North Sea, Río de la Plata, French Guiana, West Indies, Indian Ocean, North America, South Caucasus	1803	1815	12
9	World War I	15,000,000	65,000,000	Global	1914	1918	4
10	World War II	40,000,000	85,000,000	Global	1939	1945	6
11	Cold War			Global	1945	1992	47
12	War on terror	4,500,000	4,600,000	Global	2001	Present	

== See also ==
- List of largest empires
- List of military conflicts spanning multiple wars
- List of countries by number of military and paramilitary personnel
- List of militaries by country

== Bibliography ==
- Shapiro, Fred R.; Epstein, Joseph (2006). The Yale Book of Quotations. Yale University Press. ISBN 978-0-300-10798-2.
- Willmott, H. P. (2003). World War I. Dorling Kindersley. ISBN 978-0-7894-9627-0. OCLC 52541937.
