= 1612 in Japan =

- Decades: 1590s; 1600s; 1610s; 1620s; 1630s
- See also: Other events of 1612; History of Japan • Timeline • Years

Events of the year 1612 in Japan.

== Incumbents ==
- Monarch: Go-Mizunoo
- Shogun: Tokugawa Hidetada

== Events ==
- Okamoto Daihachi incident: Intrigues involving the investiture of fiefs, along with a plot by Christian daimyo Arima Harunobu to kill Nagasaki governor Hasegawa Fujihiro, as well as a series of frauds and conspiracies by Christian daimyos further erodes the shogunate's trust in Christianity.
- Nagoya Castle is finished.

== Births ==
N/A

== Deaths ==
- June 5: Arima Harunobu, daimyo of the Shimabara Domain (b.1567)
- August 20: Naitō Nobunari, samurai and daimyo of Omi Province (b.1545)
- September 9: Nakagawa Hidenari, daimyo of Oka Domain (b.1570)
