= 1616 in Japan =

- Decades: 1590s; 1600s; 1610s; 1620s; 1630s
- See also: Other events of 1616; History of Japan • Timeline • Years

Events of the year 1616 in Japan.

== Incumbents ==
- Monarch: Go-Mizunoo
- Shogun: Tokugawa Hidetada

== Events ==
- May 15: Magistrate of Nagasaki Murayama Tōan sets sail to Taiwan in order to establish a base there.
- June 1: Tokugawa Ieyasu dies at the age of seventy-three.
- August 8: An edict of the shogunate restricts most foreigners, other than Chinese, from trading outside of the ports of Nagasaki and Hirado.
- October 10: Sakazaki Naomori of Tsuwano Domain fails to capture Senhime.
- October 21: Naomori commits suicide after failing to capture Senhime.
- Date unknown: The first embassy of the Ayutthaya Kingdom to Japan arrives.

== Births ==
- January 1: Nabeshima Naozumi, daimyo of Hasunoike Domain (1639-1665) (d.1669)
- October 15: Hoshina Masakage, daimyo of Iino Domain (1661-1686) (d.1700)

== Deaths ==
- June 1: Tokugawa Ieyasu, daimyo, samurai, general, and first shogun of the Tokugawa Shogunate. (1603-1605) (b.1543)
- July 20: Honda Masanobu, commander and daimyo of Tamanawa Castle and Tamanawa Domain. (1590-1616) (b.1538)
- October 21: Sakazaki Naomori, daimyo of Tsuwano Domain (1601-1616) (b.1563)
- November 20: Matsumae Yoshihiro, daimyo of Matsumae Domain (1583-1616) (b.1548)
- date unknown: Shimozuma Chūkō, Buddhist monk of the Hongan-ji school. (b.1551)
