= 1613 in Japan =

- Decades: 1590s; 1600s; 1610s; 1620s; 1630s
- See also: Other events of 1613; History of Japan • Timeline • Years

Events of the year 1613 in Japan.

== Incumbents ==
- Monarch: Go-Mizunoo
- Shogun: Tokugawa Hidetada

== Events ==
- December 26: The Date Maru, a ship carrying diplomats led by Hasekura Tsunenaga, reaches California.

== Deaths ==
- March 16: Ikeda Terumasa, daimyo of Himeji Domain. (b.1565)
