= 1868 in Japan =

- Decades: 1840s; 1850s; 1860s; 1870s; 1880s
- See also: Other events of 1868; History of Japan • Timeline • Years

Events from the year 1868 in Japan. It corresponds to Keiō 4 and Meiji 1 in the Japanese calendar. In the history of Japan, it marks the beginning of the Meiji period on October 23 under the reign of Emperor Meiji.

== Incumbents ==
- Emperor: Emperor Meiji

== Events ==
- January 6 (Keiō 3, 10th day of the 12th month) – The restoration of the Imperial government was announced to the kuge. The year 1868 began as Keio 3, and did not become Meiji 1 until the 8th day of the 9th month of Keio 4, i.e., October 23; although retrospectively, it was quoted as the first year of the new era from 25 January onwards.
- January 27–31 – Battle of Toba–Fushimi
- January 28 – Battle of Awa
- February 2 – Fall of Osaka castle
- March 29 – Battle of Kōshū-Katsunuma and Battle of Hokuetsu
- May 10–14 – Battle of Utsunomiya Castle
- July 4 – Battle of Ueno
- September 3 (Keiō 4, 17th day of the 7th month) – Emperor Meiji announces that the name of the city of Edo was being changed to Tokyo, or "eastern capital".
- October 6 – Battle of Bonari Pass
- October–November – Battle of Aizu
- October 23 (Keiō 4/Meiji 1, 8th day of the 9th month)
  - The Japanese era name (nengō) is formally changed from Keiō to Meiji; and a general amnesty is granted. The adoption of the Meiji nengō was done retroactively to January 25, 1868 (Keiō 4/Meiji 1, 1st day of the 1st month).
  - Emperor Meiji travels to Tokyo and Edo castle became an imperial palace.
- November 7 – Battle of Noheji

== Births ==
- January 10 – Ozaki Kōyō, author and writer (d. 1903)
- January 11 – Shimizu Shikin, novelist and women's rights activist (d. 1933)
- January 18 – Suzuki Kantarō, admiral, 42nd Prime Minister of Japan (d. 1948)
- January 20 – Keisuke Okada, 20th Prime Minister of Japan (d. 1952)
- April 12 – Akiyama Saneyuki, soldier (d. 1918)
- May 27 – Takeo Hirose, naval officer (d. 1904)
- December 8 – Kenjirō Tokutomi, philosopher and writer (d. 1927)
- December 29 – Kitamura Tokoku, poet, essayist and writer (d. 1894)

== Deaths ==
- January 29 – Inoue Genzaburō, captain of the sixth unit of the Shinsengumi (b. 1829)
- February 6 – Yamazaki Susumu, Shinsengumi officer and spy (b. ca 1843)
- May 17 – Kondō Isami, samurai and bakufu official (b. 1834)
- June 27 – Hayashi Yasusada, samurai (b. 1806)
- July 19 – Okita Sōji, captain of the first unit of the Shinsengumi (b. 1844)
- October 8
  - Shinoda Gisaburō, samurai, Byakkotai (b. 1852)
  - Jinbo Kuranosuke, samurai (b. 1816)
  - Tanaka Tosa, samurai (b. 1820)
- October 16 – Nakano Takeko, female warrior (b. 1847)
