= Sino-Japanese War =

Sino-Japanese War most often refers to:

- The First Sino-Japanese War (1894–95), between China (Qing dynasty) and Japan (Empire of Japan), primarily over control of Korea
- The Second Sino-Japanese War (1937–45), began between China (Republic of China) and Japan (Empire of Japan) in 1937, eventually becoming part of World War II in December 1941 when China joined the Allies and officially declared war against Japan

It may also refer to:

- Baekje–Tang War (660–663), fought between Baekje and the allied forces of Tang and Silla between 660 and 663; it was in some respect a spillover of the, at the time, ongoing Goguryeo–Tang War
- Battle of Baekgang (663), a battle between Baekje restoration forces and their ally, Yamato Japan, against the allied forces of Silla and the Tang Dynasty of ancient China
- Goguryeo–Tang War (645–668), was fought between Goguryeo and the Tang dynasty. During the course of the war, the two sides allied with various other states.
- Mongol invasions of Japan (1274), (1281)
- Ningbo incident (1523)
- Jiajing wokou raids (1542–1567), by Chinese-led international merchant-pirates (including the Japanese) on Ming dynasty China
- Japanese invasions of Korea (1592–98), was a full-scale war between a Ming dynasty and Joseon coalition and the invading Japanese
- Boxer Rebellion (1898–1901), where Japan was part of the Eight-Nation Alliance that invaded Qing dynasty China to crush the Boxers
- Jinan incident (1928), between Japanese-backed warlords and the Kuomintang
- Japanese invasion of Manchuria, in 1931
- Pacification of Manchukuo, from 1931 to 1942
- January 28 Incident (1932), between the Republic of China and the Empire of Japan in, and around, Shanghai
- Defense of the Great Wall (1933), of Rehe (province) and subsequent Actions in Inner Mongolia (1933–1936)
- Burma Campaign, of World War II from 1942 to 1945, where the Chinese fought the Japanese Burma Army on the north wing of the campaign, in aid of British Empire forces

== See also ==
- Japanese-Taiwan Wars
