= 737 in Japan =

- Decades: 710s; 720s; 730s; 740s; 750s
- See also: Other events of 737; History of Japan • Timeline • Years

Events in the year 737 in Japan.

== Incumbents ==
- Monarch: Emperor Shōmu

== Events ==
- A major Japanese smallpox epidemic that started in 735 finally runs its course, but only after causing an estimated 25% to 35% mortality among the adult population in the country.

== Births ==
- Fujiwara no Tanetsugu, Japanese nobleman (d. 785)
- Emperor Kanmu (d. 806)

== Deaths ==
- Fujiwara no Fusasaki, Japanese counselor (b. 681)
- Fujiwara no Maro, Japanese politician (b. 695)
- Fujiwara no Muchimaro, Japanese minister (b. 680)
- Fujiwara no Umakai, Japanese statesman (b. 694)
