= 885 in Japan =

- Decades: 860s; 870s; 880s; 890s; 900s
- See also: Other events of 885; History of Japan • Timeline • Years

Events in the year 885 in Japan.

== Incumbents ==
- Monarch: Kōkō

== Births ==
- January 18 – Emperor Daigo (died 930)
