= 1737 in Japan =

- Decades: 1710s; 1720s; 1730s; 1740s; 1750s
- See also: Other events of 1737; History of Japan • Timeline • Years

Events from the year 1737 in Japan.

== Incumbents ==
- Monarch: Sakuramachi
- Shogun: Tokugawa Yoshimune

== Deaths ==
- May 10 – Emperor Nakamikado (b. 1702)
