= 1614 in Japan =

- Decades: 1590s; 1600s; 1610s; 1620s; 1630s
- See also: Other events of 1614; History of Japan • Timeline • Years

Events of the year 1614 in Japan.

== Incumbents ==
- Monarch: Go-Mizunoo
- Shogun: Tokugawa Hidetada

== Events ==
- January 22: Hasekura Tsunenaga's trade expedition to the New World arrives in the Spanish colony of New Spain (modern-day Mexico), with 22 samurai, 120 Japanese merchants, sailors and servants, and 40 Spaniards and Portuguese who serve as interpreters.
- January 25: Hasekura's expedition arrives in Acapulco.
- February 1: The practice of Christianity is banned by a decree issued by the shogun. The decree also calls for the expulsion of all missionaries.
- March 15: Construction begins on Takada Castle.
- November 19: Toyotomi Hideyori, after having opened a Buddhist temple praying for ōgosho Ieyasu's death, is ordered by Ieyasu to leave Osaka Castle. Hideyori refuses and instead fortifies himself in Osaka Castle, defended by samurai, prompting Ieyasu to send 3,000 troops across the Kizu River, destroying the fort there.
- November 26: Battle of Imafuku: Tokugawa forces engage Toyotomi forces to secure the site for a fort. Although the Tokugawa suffer heavy losses, they secure the village, and Toyotomi forces are forced to retreat.
- December 4: Ieyasu's troops arrive at Osaka Castle, beginning the Siege of Osaka.

== Births ==
- January 10: Kanō Yasunobu, painter of the Kanō School. (d.1685)

== Deaths ==
- February 23: Murakoshi Naoyoshi, samurai. (b.1562)
- June 13: Sengoku Hidehisa, daimyo of the Komoro Domain, samurai who captured Ishikawa Goemon. (b.1552)
- June 27: Maeda Toshinaga, samurai, daimyo of the Kaga Domain (1599-1605). (b.1562)
- July 19: Akizuki Tanenaga, samurai, daimyo of the Takanabe Domain. (b.1567)
- November 29: Mogami Yoshiaki, daimyo of the Yamagata Domain. (b.1546)
