= 1607 in Japan =

- Decades: 1580s; 1590s; 1600s; 1610s; 1620s
- See also: Other events of 1607; History of Japan • Timeline • Years

Events of the year 1607 in Japan.

== Incumbents ==
- Monarch: Go-Yōzei
- Shogun: Tokugawa Hidetada

== Events ==
- Sunpu Castle begins construction.

== Births ==
- November 23: Tokugawa Masako, daughter of Tokugawa Hidetada and consort of Emperor Go-Mizunoo (d.1678)
- November 25: Kanō Naonobu, painter of the Kanō School (d. 1650)
- probable: Yagyū Jūbei Mitsuyoshi, samurai (d. 1650)

== Deaths ==
- March 29: Tsugaru Tamenobu, daimyo of Hirosaki Domain (b. 1550)
- June 2: Yūki Hideyasu, daimyo of Fukui Domain, first daimyo of Yuki Domain (b.1574)
- October 16: Hōzōin In'ei, Buddhist monk and teacher, guardian of all temples of Nara. (b.1521)
