= 1869 in Japan =

- Decades: 1840s; 1850s; 1860s; 1870s; 1880s
- See also: Other events of 1869; History of Japan • Timeline • Years

Events from the year 1869 in Japan. It corresponds to Meiji 2 in the Japanese calendar.

== Incumbents ==
- Emperor: Emperor Meiji

== Events ==
- January 11 – Marriage of Emperor Meiji to Ichijo Haruko, thenceforth the Empress Shōken.
- January 27 – Following defeat of the forces of the Tokugawa shogunate on Honshū in the Boshin War, former Tokugawa military led by Admiral Enomoto Takeaki flee to Ezo (Hokkaido), the large but sparsely populated northernmost island in Japan, and establish the Republic of Ezo. Ezo is notable for being the first government to attempt to institute democracy in Japan. Elections were based on universal suffrage among the samurai class. This was the first election ever held in Japan. Enomoto made a last effort to petition the Imperial Court to be allowed to develop Hokkaido and maintain the traditions of the samurai unmolested, but his request was denied
- February – The Imperial faction took delivery (February 1869) of the French-built ironclad Kotetsu, the first ironclad warship of the Imperial Japanese Navy.
- February 11 – Kannonzaki Lighthouse (Japan's first Western style lighthouse) lights up for the first time.
- March 20 – Newspaper publication is permitted.
- April 9 – Imperial troops, numbering 7,000, finally land on Ezo.
- May 4 –10 – Naval Battle of Hakodate ends in a decisive Imperial victory.
- May 6 – Battle of Miyako Bay ends in an Imperial victory. The forces of Republic of Ezo desperately attempt to neutralize the powerful ironclad warship Kōtetsu, although the attempt ended in failure. The Imperial Navy continue north unimpeded, and support landing and combat operations of thousands of government troops in the Battle of Hakodate.
- June 26 – President Enomoto Takeaki of the Republic of Ezo surrenders, turning Ezo's main fortress of Goryōkaku over to Satsuma staff officer Kuroda Kiyotaka on June 27.
- June 27 – After having lost close to half their numbers and most of their ships, the military of Ezo Republic surrenders to the Meiji government, this formally ending the Republic of Ezo. Hokkaidō comes under the rule of the central government headed by the Meiji Emperor.
- September 4 – The Emperor receives The Duke of Edinburgh.
- September 20 – Ezo was given its present name, Hokkaido (北海道 Hokkaidō, literally "Northern Sea Region").
- October 9 – Ōmura Masujirō and several associates are attacked at an inn in Kyoto. Wounded in several places, he barely escaped with his life by hiding in a bath full of dirty water. The wound on his leg would not heal Ōmura died of his wounds on December 7.

== Births ==
- November 15 – Gōtarō Mikami, military doctor (d. 1964)

== Deaths ==
- February 15 – Yokoi Shōnan, scholar and political reformer (b. 1809)
- June 20 – Hijikata Toshizō, Vice-Commander of the Shinsengumi, and military leader (b. 1835)
- December 7 – Ōmura Masujirō, military leader (assassinated) (b. 1824)
