= 1721 in Japan =

- Decades: 1700s; 1710s; 1720s; 1730s; 1740s
- See also: Other events of 1721; History of Japan • Timeline • Years

Events in the year 1721 in Japan.

== Incumbents ==
- Monarch: Nakamikado
- Shogun: Tokugawa Yoshimune

== Events ==
- January 3 – The Love Suicides at Amijima (Shinjūten no Amijima) is performed for the first time at the Takemoto Theater. (Traditional Japanese Date: Sixth Day of the Twelfth Month, 1720)

== Births ==
- Tokugawa Munetada, samurai
