= 1618 in Japan =

- Decades: 1590s; 1600s; 1610s; 1620s; 1630s
- See also: Other events of 1618; History of Japan • Timeline • Years

Events of the year 1618 in Japan.

== Incumbents ==
- Monarch: Go-Mizunoo
- Shogun: Tokugawa Hidetada

== Events ==
- January 28: Rules for the Ōõku, the section of Edo Castle that houses the shogun's wife and concubines, are established.
- date unknown: A comet appears in the sky.

== Births ==
- July 21: Hayashi Gahō, philosopher (d.1688)
