= 1685 in Japan =

- Decades: 1660s; 1670s; 1680s; 1690s; 1700s
- See also: Other events of 1685; History of Japan • Timeline • Years

Events in the year 1685 in Japan.

== Incumbents ==
- Monarch: Reigen
- Shogun: Tokugawa Tsunayoshi

== Deaths ==
- March 22 – Emperor Go-Sai (b. 1638)
