= 1628 in Japan =

- Decades: 1600s; 1610s; 1620s; 1630s; 1640s
- See also: Other events of 1628; History of Japan • Timeline • Years

Events from the year 1628 in Japan.

== Incumbents ==
- Monarch: Go-Mizunoo
- Shogun: Tokugawa Iemitsu

== Births ==
- July 11 – Tokugawa Mitsukuni, daimyō (d. 1701)
