= 1703 in Japan =

- Decades: 1680s; 1690s; 1700s; 1710s; 1720s
- See also: Other events of 1703; History of Japan • Timeline • Years

Events in the year 1703 in Japan.

== Incumbents ==
- Monarch: Higashiyama
- Shogun: Tokugawa Tsunayoshi

== Events ==
- January 30 or 31 – The famed Forty-seven rōnin avenge their leader, Asano Naganori out of loyalty by attacking and killing Kira Kozuke no Suke Yoshinaka, despite being ordered not to. (Traditional Japanese Date: Fourteenth Day of the Twelfth Month, 1702)
- December 31 – The 1703 Genroku earthquake occurred on 02:00 local time, killing 2,300. The earthquake may have also triggered a tsunami that possibly killed 10,000.

== Births ==
- Kaga no Chiyo, poet and nun (died 1775)

== Deaths ==
- January 30 or 31 – Kira Yoshinaka, kōke, assassinated.
- March 20
  - Ōishi Yoshio, leader of the forty-seven rōnin, seppuku.
  - Horibe Yasubee, samurai and member of the forty-seven rōnin, seppuku.
  - Takebayashi Takashige, samurai and member of the forty-seven rōnin, seppuku.
