= 1872 in Japan =

- Decades: 1850s; 1860s; 1870s; 1880s; 1890s
- See also: Other events of 1872; History of Japan • Timeline • Years

Events in the year 1872 in Japan.

== Incumbents ==
- Emperor: Emperor Meiji
- Empress consort: Empress Shōken

=== Governors ===
- Aichi Prefecture: Iseki Ushitora (starting April 2)
- Akita Prefecture: Shima Yoshitake (January 29-July 29), Sugio Magoshichiro (starting July 29)
- Aomori Prefecture: J. Hishida
- Fukui Prefecture: Kotobuki Murata
- Fukushima Prefecture:
  - until January 20: Tomoharu Kiyooka
  - January 20-June 2: Miyahara
  - starting June 2: Taihe Yasujo
- Gifu Prefecture: Joren Hasegawa
- Gunma Prefecture: Sada Aoyama
- Hiroshima Prefecture: Date Muneoki
- Ibaraki Prefecture:
  - until July 10: Yamaguchi
  - August 8-August 13: Motsuke Nomura
  - starting August 25: Toru Watanabe
- Iwate Prefecture: Korekiyo Shima
- Kagawa Prefecture:
  - until October 17: Mohei Hayashi
  - October 17-November 28: Kan'ichi Nakamura
  - starting November 28: Mohei Hayashi
- Kochi Prefecture: Yuzo Hayashi (until November 26), Iwasaki Nagatake (starting November 26)
- Kyoto Prefecture: Hase Nobuatsu
- Miyagi Prefecture: Ryo Shioya (starting January 8)
- Nagano Prefecture: Tachiki Kenzen
- Niigata Prefecture: Hirimatsu (starting November 20)
- Oita Prefecture: Kei Morishita
- Osaka Prefecture: Yotsutsuji Nishi
- Saga Prefecture:
  - until July 12: Sadao Koga
  - July 12-December 22: Tesshu Yamaoka
  - starting December 22: Taku Shigeru
- Saitama Prefecture: Morihide Nomura
- Shiname Prefecture:
  - until March 30: Masami Terada
  - March 30-September 27: Tanenori Ikeda
  - starting September 27: Kamiyama Ren
- Tochigi Prefecture: Miki Nabeshima
- Tokyo: Yuri Kousei (until September 7), Tadahiro Okubo (starting September 7)
- Toyama Prefecture: Miyoshi Zhou Liang
- Yamagata Prefecture: ......

== Events ==
- date unknown
  - Tokyo National Museum is founded.
  - The Imperial Library is established.
  - Tomioka silk mill, Japan's first modern model silk reeling factory, is established by the government.
  - The Ryukyu Domain is created when the emperor changes the title of Shō Tai, the Ryukyu Kingdom's monarch (Ryūkyū-koku-ō), to that of a domain head (Ryūkyū-han-ō). The former Ryukyu Kingdom thus becomes a han.

== Births ==
- January 22 – Katai Tayama, novelist (d. 1930)
- March 25 – Tōson Shimazaki, writer (d. 1943)
- May 2 – Ichiyō Higuchi, writer (d. 1896)

== Deaths ==
- February 10 – Prince Kitashirakawa Satonari, founder of a collateral branch of the Japanese imperial family (born 1850)
- March 28 – Nambu Nobuyuki, 9th and final daimyō of Hachinohe Domain (born 1814)
