= 1675 in Japan =

- Decades: 1650s; 1660s; 1670s; 1680s; 1690s
- See also: Other events of 1675; History of Japan • Timeline • Years

Events in the year 1675 in Japan.

== Incumbents ==
- Monarch: Reigen
- Shogun: Tokugawa Ietsuna

== Births ==
- October 21 – Emperor Higashiyama (d. 1710)
