= 1653 in Japan =

- Decades: 1630s; 1640s; 1650s; 1660s; 1670s
- See also: Other events of 1653; History of Japan • Timeline • Years

Events in the year 1653 in Japan.

== Incumbents ==
- Monarch: Go-Kōmyō
- Shogun: Tokugawa Ietsuna

== Births ==
- date unknown – Chikamatsu Monzaemon, playwright (d. 1725)
