= 1604 in Japan =

- Decades: 1580s; 1590s; 1600s; 1610s; 1620s
- See also: Other events of 1604; History of Japan • Timeline • Years

Events of the year 1604 in Japan.

== Incumbents ==
- Monarch: Go-Yōzei
- Shogun: Tokugawa Ieyasu

== Events ==
- June: Battle of Dangpo: After an armed Japanese trading vessel enters into Korean waters, tensions escalate into naval combat. The Korean fleet overpowers the Japanese and captures the vessel, with the losing crew being captured and interrogated.
- Date Masamune and Tōdō Takatora advise the shogunate to implement a rule where each daimyo must have a residence in Edo. This rule is then swiftly implemented by shogun Ieyasu.

== Births ==
- August 12 – Tokugawa Iemitsu, 3rd shogun of the Tokugawa shogunate. (d. 1651)

== Deaths ==
- April 19 – Kuroda Yoshitaka, daimyo, head of the Kuroda Clan. (b. 1546)
- August 8 – Horio Tadauji, daimyo of Matsue. (b. 1578)
- August 20 – Toda Kazuaki, samurai. (b. 1542)
