= 1725 in Japan =

- Decades: 1700s; 1710s; 1720s; 1730s; 1740s
- See also: Other events of 1725; History of Japan • Timeline • Years

Events in the year 1725 in Japan.

== Incumbents ==
- Monarch: Nakamikado
- Shogun: Tokugawa Yoshimune

== Deaths ==
- January 6 – Chikamatsu Monzaemon, playwright (b. 1653)
