= 1873 in Japan =

- Decades: 1850s; 1860s; 1870s; 1880s; 1890s
- See also: Other events of 1873; History of Japan • Timeline • Years

Events in the year 1873 in Japan.

== Incumbents ==
- Monarch: Emperor Meiji

=== Governors ===
- Aichi Prefecture: Iseki Ushitora
- Akita Prefecture: Sugio Magoshichiro (until May 5), Senkichi Kokushi (starting May 5)
- Aomori Prefecture: J. Hishida
- Ehime Prefecture: Egi Yasunao
- Fukui Prefecture: Kotobuki Murata
- Fukushima Prefecture: Taihe Yasujo
- Gifu Prefecture: Joren Hasegawa
- Gunma Prefecture: Sada Aoyama (until November 2), vacant (starting November 2)
- Hiroshima Prefecture: Date Muneoki
- Ibaraki Prefecture: Toru Watanabe (starting September 9)
- Iwate Prefecture: Korekiyo Shima
- Kagawa Prefecture: Mohei Hayashi (until February 20)
- Kochi Prefecture: Iwasaki Nagatake
- Kyoto Prefecture: Hase Nobuatsu
- Mie Prefecture: Ryo Shioya
- Miyagi Prefecture: Tokisuke Miyagi
- Miyazaki Prefecture: Weiken Fukuyama
- Nagano Prefecture: Tachiki Kenzen then Narasaki Hiroshi
- Niigata Prefecture: Kusumoto Masataka
- Oita Prefecture: Kei Morishita
- Osaka Prefecture: Norobu Watanabe
- Saga Prefecture: Taku Shigeru then Ishii Kuni then Michitoshi Iwamura
- Saitama Prefecture: Morihide Nomura then Tasuke Shirane
- Shiname Prefecture: Kamiyama Ren
- Tochigi Prefecture: Iseki Ushitora
- Tokushima Prefecture: Nobuhiro Sato
- Tokyo: Miki Nabeshima
- Toyama Prefecture: Tadahiro Okubo
- Yamagata Prefecture: ......
- Yamaguchi Prefecture: Mishima Michitsune

== Events ==
- January 1 - Japan begins using the Gregorian calendar.
- January 4 - With the adoption of the Western calendar, the five seasonal festivals (gosekku) — Jinjitsu on January 7, Jōshi on March 3, Tango on May 5, Tanabata on July 7 and Chōyō on September 9) — are abolished.
