= 1660 in Japan =

- Decades: 1640s; 1650s; 1660s; 1670s; 1680s
- See also: Other events of 1660; History of Japan • Timeline • Years

Events in the year 1660 in Japan.

== Incumbents ==
- Monarch: Go-Sai

== Events ==
- January 25 – A bridge that spans the Sumida River in Tokyo, the Ryōgoku Bridge, is built to give people a means of escape from fires and to encourage the city's expansion. (Traditional Japanese Date: Thirteenth Day of the Twelfth Month, 1659)
