= 1702 in Japan =

- Decades: 1680s; 1690s; 1700s; 1710s; 1720s
- See also: Other events of 1702; History of Japan • Timeline • Years

The following is a list of events from the year 1702 in Japan.

== Incumbents ==
- Monarch: Higashiyama
- Shogun: Tokugawa Tsunayoshi

== Births ==
- January 14 – Emperor Nakamikado (d. 1737)

== Deaths ==
- Hon'inbō Dōsaku
