= 1651 in Japan =

- Decades: 1630s; 1640s; 1650s; 1660s; 1670s
- See also: Other events of 1651; History of Japan • Timeline • Years

Events of the year 1651 in Japan.

== Incumbents ==
- Monarch: Go-Kōmyō
- Shogun: Tokugawa Iemitsu until June 8, Tokugawa Ietsuna starting September 10.

== Events ==
- June 8: Shogun Tokugawa Iemitsu dies of a stroke aged forty-seven.
- September 10: Tokugawa Ietsuna succeeds his father as shogun.
- Date unknown: The Keian Uprising against the Tokugawa Shogunate fails.

== Births ==
- September 6: Aoyama Tadao, daimyo of Hamamatsu Domain (d.1685)
- September 16: Engelbert Kaempfer, German physician and traveler known for his expedition to Japan. (d.1716)

== Deaths ==
- June 8: Tokugawa Iemitsu, samurai, daimyo, and third shogun of the Tokugawa Shogunate (1623-1651) (b.1604)
- September 10: Yui Shōsetsu, rōnin and military scholer. (b.1605)
- September 24: Marubashi Chūya, rebel
