= 1638 in Japan =

- Decades: 1610s; 1620s; 1630s; 1640s; 1650s
- See also: Other events of 1638; History of Japan; Timeline; Years

Events in the year 1638 in Japan.

== Incumbents ==
- Monarch: Meisho
- Shogun: Tokugawa Iemitsu

== Events ==
- April 15 – the Shimabara Rebellion is put down.

== Births ==
- January 1 – Emperor Go-Sai (d. 1685)
- February 28 – Ikeda Tsunamasa (d. 1714)

== Deaths ==
- April 7 – Shimazu Tadatsune
- August 28 – Matsukura Katsuie
