= 1683 in Japan =

- Decades: 1660s; 1670s; 1680s; 1690s; 1700s
- See also: Other events of 1683; History of Japan • Timeline • Years

Events in the year 1683 in Japan.

== Incumbents ==
- Monarch: Reigen
- Shogun: Tokugawa Tsunayoshi

== Events ==
- January 25 – Yaoya Oshichi sets fire to her home in the hopes of being able to meet a young priest with whom she fell in love while seeking shelter from a previous fire. The fire destroyed a large section of Edo (present day Tokyo). Oshichi was later caught and punished for her crime by being burned at the stake. (Traditional Japanese Date: Twenty-eighth Day of the Twelfth Month, 1682)
