= 1605 in Japan =

- Decades: 1580s; 1590s; 1600s; 1610s; 1620s
- See also: Other events of 1605; History of Japan • Timeline • Years

Events of the year 1605 in Japan.

== Incumbents ==
- Monarch: Go-Yōzei
- Shogun: Tokugawa Ieyasu until April 16, Tokugawa Hidetada starting April 16

== Events ==
- January 15 - A new volcanic island, Hachijōko-jima, arose from the sea at the side of Hachijō Island (八丈島 Hachijō-jima) in the Izu Islands (伊豆諸島, Izu-shotō) which stretch south and east from the Izu Peninsula.

- February 3 – The 1605 Keichō earthquake, of an estimated 7.9 magnitude, strikes the south of the island of Honshu, and triggers a tsunami that washes away and destroys hundreds of houses and buildings, killing thousands.
- April 16 - Tokugawa Ieyasu abdicates as shogun, becoming Ogosho (retired shogun). His son Tokugawa Hidetada succeeds him to the office.

== Births ==
N/A

== Deaths ==
December 6 - Murai Nagayori, samurai
