= 1828 in Japan =

- Decades: 1800s; 1810s; 1820s; 1830s; 1840s
- See also: Other events of 1828; History of Japan • Timeline • Years

Events in the year 1828 in Japan.

== Incumbents ==
- Monarch: Ninkō
- Shogun: Tokugawa Ienari

== Births ==
- January 23 – Saigō Takamori (d. 1877), samurai
- Oura Okei (d. 1884), businesswoman
