= 1710 in Japan =

- Decades: 1690s; 1700s; 1710s; 1720s; 1730s
- See also: Other events of 1710; History of Japan • Timeline • Years

The following events occurred in Japan in the year 1710.

== Events ==
=== Dates Unknown ===
- Creation of the Outline Map of All Countries of the Universe (Nansenbushu Bankoku Shoka No Zu). This is the first Japanese printed map to depict the geographical world.

== Incumbents ==
- Monarch: Nakamikado
- Shogun: Tokugawa Ienobu

== Deaths ==
=== January ===
- January 16 – Emperor Higashiyama (b. 1675)
