= 935 in Japan =

- Decades: 910s; 920s; 930s; 940s; 950s
- See also: Other events of 935; History of Japan • Timeline • Years

Events in the year 935 in Japan.

== Incumbents ==
- Monarch: Suzaku

== Events ==
- January 28 – Provincial governor Ki no Tsurayuki begins writing the Tosa Diary, describing his return to Kyoto. (Traditional Japanese Date: Twenty-first Day of the Twelfth Month, 934)
