= 1610 in Japan =

- Decades: 1590s; 1600s; 1610s; 1620s; 1630s
- See also: Other events of 1610; History of Japan • Timeline • Years

Events of the year 1610 in Japan.

== Incumbents ==
- Monarch: Go-Yōzei
- Shogun: Tokugawa Hidetada

== Events ==
- Reconstruction of the Daibutsu hall in Kyōto begins.
- Toyotomi Hideyori comes to Kyoto to visit ōgosho Ieyasu.
- January 6 – Nossa Senhora da Graça incident: A Portuguese carrack sinks near Nagasaki, after fighting Japanese samurai for four nights. The captured merchants are allowed to leave, while the missionaries are allowed to remain in Japan.
- May 20: Emperor Go-Yōzei announces his intention to abdicate in favor of his son Masahito.

== Births ==
N/A

== Deaths ==
- March 19 - Hasegawa Tōhaku: Painter (b.1539)
- April 7 - Hirata Masumune: Samurai, retainer of the Shimazu clan (b.1566)
- May 11 - Ikoma Kazumasa: Samurai, daimyo of Takamatsu Domain (b.1555)
- October 14 - Amago Yoshihisa: Daimyo of Izumo Province (b.1540)
- December 3 - Honda Tadakatsu: Samurai, general, daimyo of Ōtaki Domain (1590-1601) and of Kuwana Domain (1601-1609) (b.1548)
