= 1701 in Japan =

- Decades: 1680s; 1690s; 1700s; 1710s; 1720s
- See also: Other events of 1701; History of Japan • Timeline • Years

Events from the year 1701 in Japan.

== Incumbents ==
- Monarch: Higashiyama
- Shogun: Tokugawa Tsunayoshi

== Events ==
- Forty-seven rōnin

== Deaths ==
- January 14 – Tokugawa Mitsukuni, daimyō (b. 1628)
- April 21 – Asano Naganori (b. 1667)
