= 1827 in Japan =

- Decades: 1800s; 1810s; 1820s; 1830s; 1840s
- See also: Other events of 1827; History of Japan • Timeline • Years

Events in the year 1827 in Japan.

== Incumbents ==
- Monarch: Ninkō
- Shogun: Tokugawa Ienari

== Births ==
- January 27 – Nakahama Manjirō (d. 1898), translator
