= 930 in Japan =

- Decades: 910s; 920s; 930s; 940s; 950s
- See also: Other events of 858; History of Japan; Timeline; Years

Events in the year 930 in Japan.

== Incumbents ==
- Monarch: Daigo then Suzaku

== Deaths ==
- October 30 – Emperor Daigo (born 885)
