= 1712 in Japan =

- Decades: 1690s; 1700s; 1710s; 1720s; 1730s
- See also: Other events of 1712; History of Japan • Timeline • Years

Events in the year 1712 in Japan.

== Incumbents ==
- Monarch: Nakamikado
- Shogun: Tokugawa Ienobu until November 12, vacant starting November 12

== Births ==
- January 28 – Tokugawa Ieshige (d. 1761), shōgun

== Deaths ==
- November 12 – Tokugawa Ienobu, shogun (born 1662)
