= 1867 in Japan =

- Decades: 1840s; 1850s; 1860s; 1870s; 1880s
- See also: Other events of 1867; History of Japan • Timeline • Years

Events in the year 1867 in Japan. It corresponds to Keiō 2 and Keiō 3 in the Japanese calendar.

== Incumbents ==
- Monarch:
  - Kōmei until January 30
  - Meiji from February 3
- Shōgun: Tokugawa Yoshinobu until November 19

== Events ==
- January 30 (Keiō 2, 25th day of the 12th month) – Emperor Kōmei dies of smallpox. He had suffered a fatally violent bout of vomiting and diarrhea. Since he had consistently opposed the anti-bakufu forces this was distinctly convenient for them and it was rumored that he was assassinated, either by radicals from Choshu or radical officials in the court. However, there is no evidence of this and it is generally believed that he was simply one more victim of what was a worldwide pandemic at the time.
- February 3 (Keiō 2, 29th day of the 12th month) – Mutsuhito ascended to the throne as Emperor Meiji.
- November 10 (Keiō 3, 15th day of the 10th month) – An Imperial edict was issued sanctioning the restoration of Imperial government.
- November 19 – Shōgun Tokugawa Yoshinobu resigns the shogunate.

== Births ==
- February 9 – Natsume Sōseki, novelist and writer (d. 1916)
- February 14 – Sakichi Toyoda, inventor and industrialist (d. 1930)
- July 23 – Kōda Rohan, writer (d. 1947)
- October 14 – Masaoka Shiki, poet, author, and literary critic (d. 1902)
- October 15 – Fujishima Takeji, painter (d. 1943)

== Deaths ==
- January – Yamamoto Otokichi, castaway (b. 1818)
- January 30 – Emperor Kōmei (b. 1831)
- May 17 – Takasugi Shinsaku, samurai (b. 1839)
- June 22 – Takeda Kanryūsai, samurai and fifth unit captain of the Shinsengumi (b. 1834)
- December 10 – Sakamoto Ryōma, samurai and revolutionary (assassinated) (b. 1836)
- December 13 – Tōdō Heisuke, samurai and eighth unit captain of the Shinsengumi (b. 1844)
- Full date unknown:
  - Motsugai Takeda (1795–1867), Zen priest and martial artist
