= 1543 in Japan =

- Decades: 1520s; 1530s; 1540s; 1550s; 1560s
- See also: Other events of 1543; History of Japan • Timeline • Years

== Incumbents ==
- Monarch: Go-Nara

== Events ==
- August 25 – The first Europeans and firearms arrive in Japan

== Births ==
- January 31 - Tokugawa Ieyasu (d. 1616), shōgun
- February 16 – Kanō Eitoku, Japanese painter (d. 1590)
