= 1864 in Japan =

- Decades: 1840s; 1850s; 1860s; 1870s; 1880s
- See also: Other events of 1864; History of Japan • Timeline • Years

Events from the year 1864 in Japan.

== Incumbents ==
- Emperor: Kōmei
- Shogun: Tokugawa Iemochi

== Events ==
- August 20 – Kinmon incident

== Births ==
- October 8 – Kikunae Ikeda, chemist (d. 1936)
