= 1603 in Japan =

- Decades: 1580s; 1590s; 1600s; 1610s; 1620s
- See also: Other events of 1603; History of Japan • Timeline • Years

Events in the year 1603 in Japan

== Incumbents ==
- Monarch: Go-Yōzei
- Shogun: Tokugawa Ieyasu (starting March 24th)

== Events ==
- March 24: Tokugawa Ieyasu is appointed shogun, beginning both the Tokugawa Shogunate and the Edo period.
- November – Rokugō rebellion: More than 1,000 rōnin rebel in support of their exiled lord, Onodera Yoshimichi.
- Female entertainer Izumo no Okuni originates kabuki dance drama in Kyoto.
- The earliest of eight companies that will eventually merge to form the Kikkoman Corporation, the producers of soy sauce, is founded.

== Births ==
- September 15 – Tokugawa Yorifusa, daimyo (d. 1661)

== Deaths ==
- September 19 – Matsudaira Iemoto, samurai (b. 1548)
