= 1599 in Japan =

- Decades: 1570s; 1580s; 1590s; 1600s; 1610s
- See also: Other events of 1599; History of Japan • Timeline • Years

Events in the year 1599 in Japan.

== Incumbents ==
- Monarch: Go-Yōzei

== Events ==
- Founding of Toyokuni Shrine in Kyoto
- Founding of Oyama Shrine, dedicated to Maeda Toshiie

== Births ==
- June 24 - Konoe Nobuhiro

== Deaths ==
- April 1 - Matsura Takanobu
- April 27 – Maeda Toshiie (b. 1538), general
