= 858 in Japan =

- Decades: 830s; 840s; 850s; 860s; 870s
- See also: Other events of 858; History of Japan • Timeline • Years

Events in the year 858 in Japan.

== Events ==
- October 7 – Emperor Montoku dies after an 8-year reign. He is succeeded by his 8-year-old son Seiwa as the 56th emperor of Japan, with Fujiwara no Yoshifusa (Seiwa's grandfather) governing as regent and great minister of the Council of State.

== Incumbents ==
- Monarch: Montoku then Seiwa

== Deaths ==
- October 7 – Emperor Montoku (born 826)
