= 1837 in Japan =

- Decades: 1810s; 1820s; 1830s; 1840s; 1850s
- See also: Other events of 1837; History of Japan • Timeline • Years

Events in the year 1837 in Japan.

== Incumbents ==
- Monarch: Ninkō
- Shogun: Tokugawa Ienari until May 6, Tokugawa Ieyoshi starting September 4

== Events ==
- July – Morrison incident: A US ship is fired on by cannon when entering Tokyo Bay while attempting to repatriate castaway Japanese citizens.
- Tenpō famine which began in 1833 comes to an end.

== Births ==
- 28 October – Tokugawa Yoshinobu, 15th and last Tokugawa shogunate (d. 1913)
