= 1606 in Japan =

- Decades: 1580s; 1590s; 1600s; 1610s; 1620s
- See also: Other events of 1606; History of Japan • Timeline • Years

Events in the year 1606 in Japan.

== Incumbents ==
- Monarch: Go-Yōzei
- Shogun: Tokugawa Hidetada

== Events ==
- Construction began on Edo Castle.
- The first Tōshiya archery contest is held.

== Births ==
- Date unknown: Tokugawa Tadanaga, son of shogun Hidetada (d. 1634)

== Deaths ==
- Date unknown – Akaza Naoyasu, daimyo, retainer of Toyotomi Hideyoshi and Oda Nobunaga.
