= 1874 in Japan =

- Decades: 1850s; 1860s; 1870s; 1880s; 1890s
- See also: Other events of 1874; History of Japan • Timeline • Years

Events in the year 1874 in Japan.

== Incumbents ==
- Emperor: Emperor Meiji
- Empress consort: Empress Shōken

=== Governors ===
- Aichi Prefecture: Washio Takashi
- Akita Prefecture: Senkichi Kokushi
- Aomori Prefecture: J. Hishida then Masaomi Kitadai then Ikeda Tanenori
- Ehime Prefecture: Egi Yasunao
- Fukushima Prefecture: Taihe Yasujo
- Gifu Prefecture: Toshi Kozaki
- Gunma Prefecture: vacant
- Hiroshima Prefecture: Date Muneoki
- Ibaraki Prefecture: Seki Shinpei
- Iwate Prefecture: Korekiyo Shima
- Kagawa Prefecture: Mohei Hayashi
- Kochi Prefecture: Iwasaki Nagatake
- Kyoto Prefecture: Masanao Makimura
- Mie Prefecture: Masanao Makimura
- Miyazaki Prefecture: Weiken Fukuyama
- Nagano Prefecture: Narasaki Hiroshi
- Niigata Prefecture: Kusumoto Masataka
- Oita Prefecture: Kei Morishita
- Osaka Prefecture: Norobu Watanabe
- Saga Prefecture: Michitoshi Iwamura
- Saitama Prefecture: Tasuke Shirane
- Shiname Prefecture: Kamiyama Ren
- Tochigi Prefecture: Iseki Ushitora
- Tokyo: Miki Nabeshima
- Toyama Prefecture: Tadahiro Okubo
- Yamaguchi Prefecture: Mishima Michitsune

== Events ==
- February 16–April 9 – Saga Rebellion

== Births ==
- April 16 – Jōtarō Watanabe

== Deaths ==
- April 13 – Etō Shimpei (born 1834) and Shima Yoshitake (born 1822), rebel leaders (executed by beheading)
