= 794 in Japan =

- Decades: 770s; 780s; 790s; 800s; 810s
- See also: Other events of 794; History of Japan • Timeline • Years

Events in the year 794 in Japan.

== Events ==
- Heian-kyō became the capital of Japan
- The beginning of the Heian period

== Deaths ==
- Fujiwara no Taishi (died 794)
