= 1609 in Japan =

- Decades: 1580s; 1590s; 1600s; 1610s; 1620s
- See also: Other events of 1609; History of Japan • Timeline • Years

Events of the year 1609 in Japan.

== Incumbents ==
- Monarch: Go-Yōzei
- Shogun: Tokugawa Hidetada

== Events ==
- April 5: The Invasion of Ryukyu occurs. Soldiers of the Shimazu clan of Satsuma Domain capture the Ryuku capital and make the Ryukyu Kingdom a vassal of Satsuma. The kingdom is still allowed to keep its status as a tribute state of the Ming and later Qing empires until its annexation into Japan in 1879.
- November 29: A treaty is signed between Spanish nobleman Rodrigo de Vivero, former governor-general of the Philippines, and ōgosho Tokugawa Ieyasu for the purposes of establishing a Spanish factory in eastern Japan.
- Date unknown: The Dutch East India Company establishes a trading post in Hirado.

== Births ==
N/A

== Deaths ==
- June 15: Yamada Arinobu, retainer of the Shimazu clan during the Sengoku period. (b.1544)
