= 829 in Japan =

- Decades: 800s; 810s; 820s; 830s; 840s
- See also: Other events of 829; History of Japan • Timeline • Years

Events in the year 829 in Japan.

== Incumbents ==
- Monarch: Emperor Junna

== Events ==
- January 23 – Buddhist monk Kūkai establishes a private school known as the Shugei Shuchi Institute (traditional Japanese Date: 15th day of the 12th month, 828).
- Ten monks conducted a ritual reading (転読) of the complete Buddhist canon at Miroku-ji in Usa in the 19th day of the 5th month
