= 1700 in Japan =

- Decades: 1680s; 1690s; 1700s; 1710s; 1720s
- See also: Other events of 1700; History of Japan • Timeline • Years

Events in the year 1700 in Japan.

== Incumbents ==
- Monarch: Higashiyama
- Shogun: Tokugawa Tsunayoshi

== Events ==
- January 26 – The M_{w} 8.7–9.2 Cascadia earthquake takes place off the west coast of North America, as evidenced by Japanese tsunami records.

== Births ==
- Heshikiya Chōbin, Ryukyuan scholar (died 1734)
