= 826 in Japan =

- Decades: 800s; 810s; 820s; 830s; 840s
- See also: Other events of 826; History of Japan • Timeline • Years

Events in the year 826 in Japan.

== Events ==
- Kōbō-Daishi counsels the emperor to build a pagoda near To-ji in Kyoto.
- In September of this year, Kazusa, Hitachi, and Kōzuke Provinces were designated shinnō ningoku (親王任国, lit. "the imperial prince's estates/countries"), and he assumed the role of governor of all three.

== Incumbents ==
- Monarch: Junna

== Births ==
- January 22 – Emperor Montoku (died 858)
