= List of military conflicts spanning multiple wars =

Early histories of a war typically describe the war as it was declared by the states involved. It is not uncommon for later historians to group together a series of wars over a long period or spread over several theaters as part of a broader conflict or strategic campaign. The most familiar of these in the present day are probably the Cold War, which included the Korean War (1950–1953), the Vietnam War (1965–1973), and the Persian Gulf War (1990–1991); and the War on terror, which included the War in Afghanistan (2001–2021) and the Iraq War (2003–2011). These groupings provide useful context for the wars involved. Note that some groupings overlap time periods, and it is possible for more than one war to be going on at the same time.

== Afro-Eurasia ==
- 499 BC – 448 BC Greco-Persian Wars
- 322 BC – 275 BC Wars of the Diadochi
- 274 BC – 168 BC Syrian Wars
- 264 BC – 146 BC Punic Wars
- 66 BC – 628 AD Roman–Persian Wars

- 66 BC – 217 AD Roman–Parthian Wars
- 602–628 Byzantine–Sasanian War

- 66–136 Jewish–Roman wars
- 485–556 Samaritan revolts
- 622–755 Early Muslim conquests
  - 629–11th century Arab–Byzantine wars
  - 650s–737 Arab–Khazar wars
- 680–1355 Byzantine–Bulgarian wars
- 718–1492 Iberian Reconquista
- 830s–1043 Rus'–Byzantine wars
- 1048–1308 Byzantine–Seljuq wars
- 1090–1194 Nizari–Seljuk conflicts
- 1095–1291 Crusades
- 1299–1453 Byzantine–Ottoman wars
- 1676–1918 Russo-Turkish wars
- 1689–1815 Second Hundred Years' War
- 1722–1828 Russo-Persian Wars
- 1919–1923 Turkish War of Independence

== Africa ==
- 1955–present Sudanese civil wars
- 1961–1974 Portuguese Colonial War
- 1975–2002 Angolan Civil War
- 1996–present Congo wars

== Asia ==
- 133 BC – 89 AD Han–Xiongnu War
- 109 BC – 108 BC Gojoseon–Han War
- 220–280 Wars of the Three Kingdoms (China)
- 588–630 Göktürk–Persian wars
- 598–614 Goguryeo–Sui Wars
- 629-630 Tang conquest of the Eastern Turks
- 645–668 Goguryeo–Tang Wars
- 657 Tang conquest of the Western Turks
- 1206–1279 Mongol invasion of China
- 1231–1259 Mongol invasions of Korea
- 1274–1281 Mongol invasions of Japan
- 1592–1598 Japanese invasions of Korea
- 1627–1636 Manchu invasions of Korea
- 1747–1793 Ten Great Campaigns
- 1830–1907 Great Game
- 1839–1860 Opium Wars
- 1894–1945 Sino-Japanese Wars
- 1902–1932 Unification of Saudi Arabia
- 1920–present Kurdish rebellions in Turkey
- 1930–1939 Soviet–Japanese border conflicts
- 1941–1945 Pacific War also includes a small piece of Oceania Region but mainly an Asian war.
- 1947–present Indo-Pakistani wars and conflicts and Kashmir conflict
- 1948–present Arab–Israeli conflict
- 1950–1953 Korean War
- 1955–1975 Vietnam War
- 1961–1997 Iraqi–Kurdish conflict
- 1962 Sino-Indian War
- 1978–present Afghan Civil War
- 1979–1989 Soviet–Afghan War
- 2012–2019 Arab Winter
- 2023–present Middle Eastern crisis

== Americas and Europe ==
- 1609–1890 American Indian Wars
- 1688–1763 French and Indian Wars
- 1754–1815 Sixty Years' War
- 1775-1783 American Revolutionary War
- 1803-1815 Napoleonic Wars
- 1860-1877 American Civil War and Reconstruction Era (re-admitting States to the Union)

== Europe ==
- 58 BC – 50 BC Gallic Wars
- 1142–1445 Swedish–Novgorodian Wars
- 1296–1363 Wars of Scottish Independence
- 1135–1453 Wars between the kingdom of England and the French
  - 1337–1453 Hundred Years' War
- 1438–1552 Russo-Kazan Wars
- 1455–1487 Wars of the Roses
- 1494–1559 Italian Wars
- 1496–1809 Russo-Swedish wars
- 1507–1572 Russo-Crimean Wars
- 1562–1598 French Wars of Religion
- 1639–1653 Wars of the Three Kingdoms (Europe)
- 1648–1667 The Deluge
- 1785–2017 Chechen–Russian conflict
- 1792–1802 French Revolutionary Wars
- 1848–1871 Italian Wars of Independence
- 1912–1913 Balkan Wars
- 1941–1944 Continuation War (Finland-USSR)
- 1941–1945 Great Patriotic War
- 1991–2001 Yugoslav Wars
- 2014–present Russo-Ukrainian War

== Global conflicts ==
- 1756–1763 Seven Years' War
- 1914–1918 World War I
- 1939–1945 World War II
- 1945–1992 Cold War
- 2001–present War on terror
