= 1608 in Japan =

- Decades: 1580s; 1590s; 1600s; 1610s; 1620s
- See also: Other events of 1608; History of Japan • Timeline • Years

Events of the year 1608 in Japan.

== Incumbents ==
- Monarch: Go-Yōzei
- Shogun: Tokugawa Hidetada

== Events ==
- November 30 – At the colony of Portuguese Macau, a port leased from the Ming Dynasty, a group of 100 Japanese samurai, wielding katana and muskets engage in a fight with musket-armed Portuguese soldiers commanded by Governor André Pessoa. Around 50 Japanese are killed and the others are imprisoned until they sign an affidavit blaming themselves for the incident. From then on, Japanese are forbidden from travelling to Macau.

== Births ==
N/A

== Deaths ==
- March 12 – Kōriki Kiyonaga, daimyo of Iwatsuki Domain (1590–1600) (b.1530)
- September 20 – Kanamori Nagachika, samurai, retainer under Toyotomi Hideyoshi and Oda Nobunaga. (b.1524)
