= 1813 in Japan =

- Decades: 1790s; 1800s; 1810s; 1820s; 1830s
- See also: Other events of 1813; History of Japan • Timeline • Years

Events in the year 1813 in Japan.

== Incumbents ==
- Monarch: Kōkaku
- Shogun: Tokugawa Ienari

== Deaths ==
- December 24 – Empress Go-Sakuramachi (b. 1740)
