= Japanese invasion of Taiwan =

The Japanese invasion of Taiwan may refer to:

- 1616 Japanese invasion of Taiwan, resulting in Japanese retreat
- 1874 Japanese invasion of Taiwan, resulting in Chinese reparations
- 1895 Japanese invasion of Taiwan, resulting in Japanese annexation
