= 1740 in Japan =

- Decades: 1720s; 1730s; 1740s; 1750s; 1760s
- See also: Other events of 1740; History of Japan • Timeline • Years

Events in the year 1740 in Japan.

== Incumbents ==
- Monarch: Sakuramachi
- Shogun: Tokugawa Yoshimune

== Births ==
- September 23 – Empress Go-Sakuramachi (d. 1814)
