= 1870 in Japan =

- Decades: 1850s; 1860s; 1870s; 1880s; 1890s
- See also: Other events of 1870; History of Japan • Timeline • Years

Events in the year 1870 in Japan.

== Incumbents ==
- Monarch: Emperor Meiji

=== Governors ===
- Aichi Prefecture: [[]]
- Akita Prefecture: [[]]
- Aomori Prefecture: [[]]
- Fukushima Prefecture: [[]]
- Kyoto Prefecture: [[]]
- Mie Prefecture: [[]]
- Osaka Prefecture: [[]]
- Tokyo: [[]]
- Toyama Prefecture: [[]]
- Yamaguchi Prefecture: [[]]

== Events ==
- January 26 – The first public utility, Denshin, is established. (Traditional Japanese Date: Twenty-fifth Day of the Twelfth Month, Meiji 2)
