= 1836 in Japan =

- Decades: 1810s; 1820s; 1830s; 1840s; 1850s
- See also: Other events of 1836; History of Japan • Timeline • Years

Events in the year 1836 in Japan.

== Incumbents ==
- Monarch: Ninkō
- Shogun: Tokugawa Ienari

== Births ==
- January 3 – Sakamoto Ryōma, samurai and rebel leader (d. 1867)
