= 1863 in Japan =

- Decades: 1840s; 1850s; 1860s; 1870s; 1880s
- See also: Other events of 1863; History of Japan • Timeline • Years

Events from the year 1863 in Japan.

== Incumbents ==
- Emperor: Kōmei
- Shogun: Tokugawa Iemochi

== Events ==
- March 11 – Order to expel barbarians issued by the Emperor.
- July 16 – Battle of Shimonoseki Straits
- July 20-August 14 – First Shimonoseki Campaign
- August 15–17 – Bombardment of Kagoshima
- September 29 – Tenchūgumi Incident
- December 29 – Second Japanese Embassy to Europe (1863)

== Births ==
- February 23 – Katsusaburō Yamagiwa, pathologist
- March 14 – Tokutomi Sohō

== Deaths ==
- August 27 – Aizawa Seishisai
- October 27? – Serizawa Kamo
