= Sadateru Arikawa =

Japanese aikidoka (1930–2003)

- Born: 1930; Tokyo, Japan
- Died: October 11, 2003
- Nationality: Japanese

Other information
- Occupation: Aikido shihan

Sadateru Arikawa (有川定輝, Arikawa Sadateru; 1930 - October 11, 2003) was a Japanese aikido teacher and Aikikai Hombu Dojo shihan, and "one of the few remaining giants of the postwar generation of instructors that played a predominant role in the dissemination of the art worldwide."

He began training in aikido at the Aikikai Hombu Dojo in 1947 and ultimately reached the rank of 9th dan.

Arikawa was the editor of the Aikikai's newspaper from 1959 to 1974, and was known for his prodigious knowledge of the history of the art and his collection of documentary materials from its history. In addition to Wednesday night classes taught for many decades at the Hombu, he also served as chief instructor for several company and university clubs, including at Chiba Institute of Technology.
