= Yukio Koshimori =

Japanese politician (1930–2005)

- 越森 幸夫

Mayor of Okushiri
- In office 1975–2001
- Preceded by: Masaru Ueno
- Succeeded by: Tōru Gambara

Member of the Okushiri Town Council
- In office 1959–1975

Personal details
- Born: 10 December 1930 Okushiri, Hokkaido, Japan
- Died: 28 February 2005 (aged 74) Hakodate, Hokkaido, Japan
- Party: Independent

Yukio Koshimori (越森 幸夫, Koshimori Yukio; 10 December 1930 – 28 February 2005) was a Japanese politician. He was mayor of Okushiri, Hokkaidō when Okushiri Island was hit by a devastating earthquake with tsunami that caused 201 deaths on 12 July 1993.

Koshimori was elected to Okushiri's assembly in April 1959. He was elected mayor of Okushiri in 1975, and served for 22 consecutive years in spite of his arrest and conviction for bribery in 1984 of which he denied.

In 2001, Koshimori was arrested and indicted for another act of bribery, for which he was forced to resign and succeeded by Tōru Gambara. The District Court of Sapporo ordered a two-year jail term for Koshimori, but the High Court granted him a suspended term with consideration for his illness in 2004. The following year, he died of liver cancer at age 74 in Hakodate, Hokkaidō.

Preceded by Masaru Ueno	Mayor of Okushiri; 1975–2001	Succeeded by Tōru Gambara
