= AD 72 =

AD 72 in various calendars
- Gregorian calendar: AD 72; LXXII
- Ab urbe condita: 825
- Assyrian calendar: 4822
- Balinese saka calendar: N/A
- Bengali calendar: −522 – −521
- Berber calendar: 1022
- Buddhist calendar: 616
- Burmese calendar: −566
- Byzantine calendar: 5580–5581
- Chinese calendar: 辛未年 (Metal Goat); 2769 or 2562 — to — 壬申年 (Water Monkey); 2770 or 2563
- Coptic calendar: −212 – −211
- Discordian calendar: 1238
- Ethiopian calendar: 64–65
- Hebrew calendar: 3832–3833
- Hindu calendars
- Vikram Samvat: 128–129
- Shaka Samvat: N/A
- Kali Yuga: 3172–3173
- Holocene calendar: 10072
- Iranian calendar: 550 BP – 549 BP
- Islamic calendar: 567 BH – 566 BH
- Javanese calendar: N/A
- Julian calendar: AD 72; LXXII
- Korean calendar: 2405
- Minguo calendar: 1840 before ROC 民前1840年
- Nanakshahi calendar: −1396
- Seleucid era: 383/384 AG
- Thai solar calendar: 614–615
- Tibetan calendar: ལྕགས་མོ་ལུག་ལོ་ (female Iron-Sheep); 198 or −183 or −955 — to — ཆུ་ཕོ་སྤྲེ་ལོ་ (male Water-Monkey); 199 or −182 or −954

AD 72 (LXXII) was a leap year starting on Wednesday of the Julian calendar. At the time, it was known as the Year of the Consulship of Vespasian and Titus (or, less frequently, year 825 Ab urbe condita). The denomination AD 72 for this year has been used since the early medieval period, when the Anno Domini calendar era became the prevalent method in Europe for naming years.

== Events ==
=== By place ===
==== Roman Empire ====
- Antiochus IV of Syria is deposed by Emperor Vespasian.
- Vespasian and Titus are Roman Consuls.
- First Jewish–Roman War: The Roman army (Legio X Fretensis) under Sextus Lucilius Bassus lays siege to the Jewish garrison of Machaerus at the Dead Sea. After they capitulate, the Zealots are allowed to leave the fortress before it is destroyed.
- The Romans lay siege to Masada, a desert fortress held by the Sicarii.
- Flavia Neapolis (Nablus) is founded.
- Vespasian starts the building of the Colosseum; the amphitheatre is used for gladiatorial games and public spectacles, such as sea battles, re-enactments of famous battles, and dramas of Classical mythology.

== Births ==
- Julia Balbilla, princess of Commagene

== Deaths ==
- July 3 – Thomas the Apostle, Christian preacher and martyr (according to Roman Catholic tradition)
