= Satō Nobuhiro =

Japanese scientist (1769–1850)

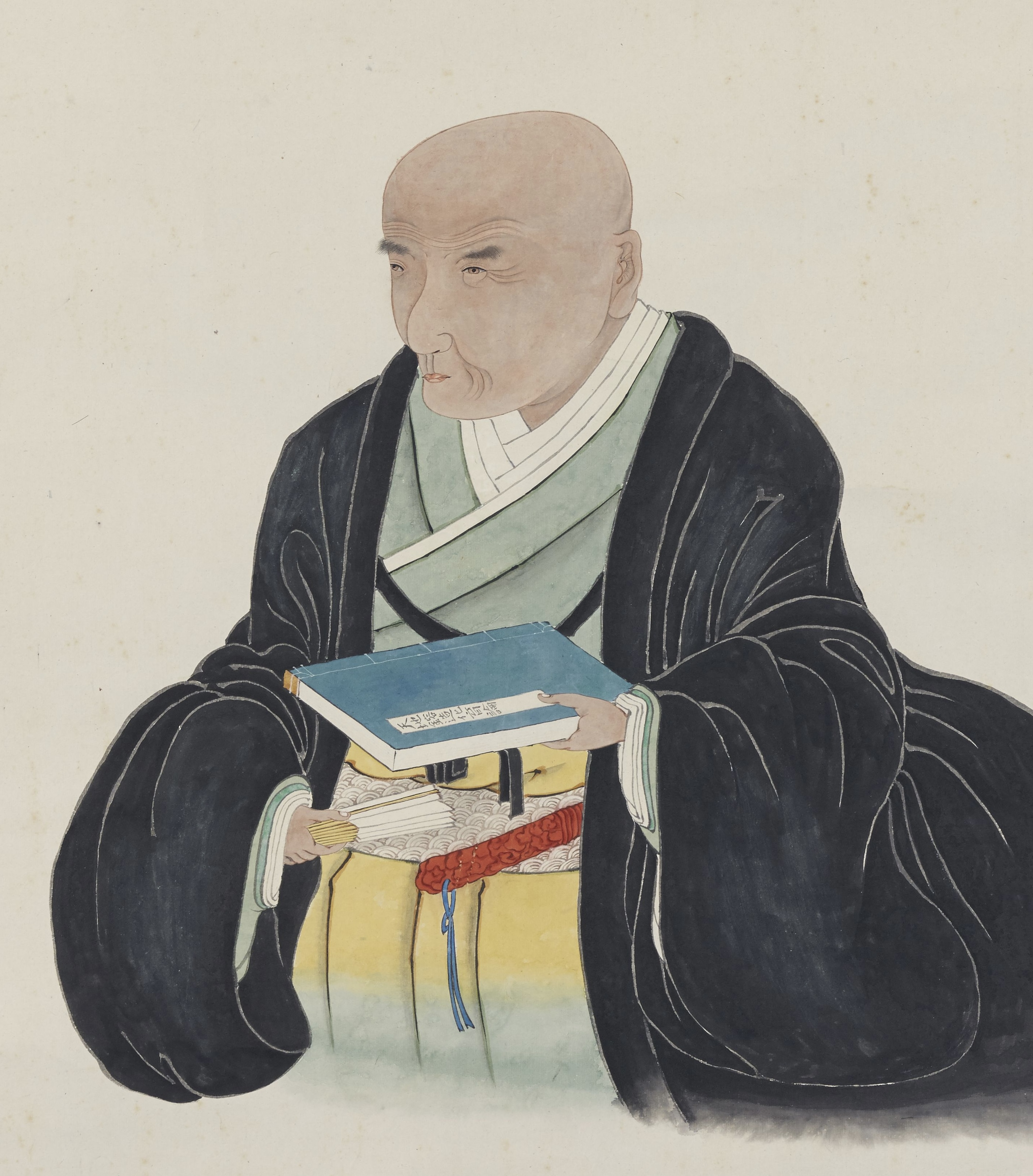
1855 portrait

Satō Nobuhiro (佐藤 信淵; July 18, 1769 – February 17, 1850) was a Japanese scientist and early advocate of Japanese Westernization. He is considered the founder of the "Greater East Asia" concept.

== Thought ==
=== Science and Shinto ===
Satō attempted to synthesize Western science (especially astronomy) with Japanese political and philosophical thought. His ideas contributed to the early modern consolidation of the religion of Shinto, especially in the form of State Shinto. In his 1825 treatise Tenchūku, Satō argued that the cosmology in the Kojiki was both indigenous to Japan and the most compatible of all world religions with astronomy. He extended the Western model, however, by arguing that Shinto provided additional explanations for astronomical phenomenon that had not yet been explained by Western astronomy.

=== Politics ===
Satō advocated an authoritarian government based on Western science and political institutions. In his Keizai yōryaku (The Epitome of Economy), he wrote that "The rationale of economy is to manage the realm, develop goods, make domains affluent, and succor everyone."

=== Military conquest ===
Satō considered the Western European great powers to be a threat that Japan needed to counter by radical economic and military reforms, as well as imperial expansion along Western European lines. His 1823 work A Secret Plan for the Unification of the World (宇内混同秘策, Udai kondō hisaku) called for Japanese world domination, describing how China should be conquered via Manchuria.

He suggested that the Japanese government embark on "colonial and agricultural undertakings" on uninhabited islands in the South China Sea. He also said that the Japanese government should take the Ryūkyū as a base to attack and capture Luzon Island by surprise, then use Luzon as a base for its "southward advance" to seize Java and other places, ultimately spreading its "military might" in Southeast Asia. He believed that Japan should "adopt suitable means of aggression and annexation" to "increase its national interests." This became the first draft of Japan's "southward advance" strategy.

== See also ==
- Greater East Asia Co-Prosperity Sphere
- Mukai Shōgen Tadakatsu, who was reported to have been planning, with William Adams, an invasion of the Philippines in 1616
