= Nobuatsu =

- Gender: Male

Origin
- Origin: Japanese
- Meaning: Different meanings depending on the kanji used

Nobuatsu (written: 宣篤, 信敦 or 伸篤) is a masculine Japanese given name. Notable people with the name include:

- Nobuatsu Aoki (青木 宣篤; born 1971), Japanese motorcycle racer
- Naitō Nobuatsu (内藤 信敦; 1777–1825), Japanese daimyō
- Nobuatsu Yoshino (吉野 伸篤; born 1940), Japanese sprint canoeist
