= 1616 Japanese expedition to Taiwan =

Failed invasion of Taiwan

1616 Japanese expedition of Taiwan
Date	1616–1617
Location	Taiwan, Southeastern coasts of China, South China Sea, Vietnam
Result	Taiwanese victory

Belligerents
Taiwanese indigenous peoples	Tokugawa (Edo) shogunate

Commanders and leaders
Unknown Aboriginal chiefs, Huang Chengxuan, Shen Yourong	Murayama Tōan

Strength
Unknown	4,000

Casualties and losses
1,200 (claimed by Japanese); Ming China reported 14 dead and 11 captured in Haimen and one captured (Dong Boqi) off the coast of Fujian	one of the Japanese ship's crew committed suicide in Taiwan, another Japanese ship was sunk by Ming Chinese off the coast of Zhejiang

The 1616 Japanese expedition of Taiwan was a failed attempt by the Tokugawa shogunate to secure a base on Taiwan in 1616 following an exploratory mission in 1609. The expedition of 13 ships and 4,000 soldiers ended in failure when a storm dispersed their ships and only a single ship made it to Taiwan. The crew of the one ship that made it to Taiwan was ambushed in a creek and committed suicide. The rest of the fleet plundered China's coastline before heading back to Japan. There are no surviving Japanese accounts of this expedition and the only information on it comes from European and Chinese sources.

== European account ==
Japanese magistrate of Nagasaki Murayama Tōan launched the invasion against Taiwan. The objective was to establish a base for the direct supply of Chinese silk, instead of having to supply from Macao or Manila.

On 15 May 1616 they left Nagasaki. Murayama's fleet of 13 ships and 4,000 warriors, under the command of one of his sons. However a typhoon dispersed the invasion force and only one ship managed to reach the island, but it was repelled by local forces. This failure put an early end to the invasion effort. The one ship in Taiwan was ambushed in a river, and all her crew committed suicide to avoid capture by indigenous Taiwanese tribespeople.

Several Japanese ships diverted themselves to plunder the Ming Chinese coast. Some Japanese ships reached the coasts of Vietnam and did not return to Nagasaki until July 1617. They claimed to have killed over 1,200 Chinese people.

== Chinese account ==
When the Ryukyu King Shō Nei learned of this plan during the preparations in the previous year (1615), he sent the interpreter Cai Chen to inform the Ming Dynasty. In the 44th year of the Wanli reign (1616), the Fujian Governor Huang Chengxuan (黃承玄) submitted a memorial to the court for this purpose. He also promoted the commander Shen Yourong (沈有容) to the position of admiral of the Fujian Navy.

A fleet of more than 3,000 people and 13 ships led by Murayama Akiyasu set out from Nagasaki on May 4, 1616, but encountered a typhoon in Ryukyu and was disbanded. The three ships led by Murayama Akiyasu drifted to Jiaozhi (now Vietnam) and returned to Nagasaki in July of the following year.

However, the three ships led by the general Akashi Michiyo arrived in northern Taiwan. After landing, the one or two hundred people on one of the ships were surrounded by indigenous people and all were forced to commit suicide. The other two ships later fled to Jishan, Lushan, Dongchong (now Dongyin Island in the Matsu Islands) and other places in the waters north of Fujian, attacking any ships they encountered. The Ming official Dong Boqi who was conducting reconnaissance was also captured and taken back to Japan.

The other seven ships, after being repaired in Ryukyu, attacked Jinmen Liaoluo, and then attacked Ningde Dajinbao. After passing Penghu and arriving at Taiwan Zhuqian Port, they turned to attack Zhejiang. One of the ships killed 14 Ming soldiers, captured 11 officials, and looted a large ship in Haimen, but the Japanese ship was then sunk by Ming general Shen Yourong. Another two ships fled after fighting with the Ming army in Ningbo Prefecture, Zhejiang . Another two ships were chased by more than 40 Ming army ships when attacking Dachen in Taizhou Prefecture and then to the sea of Wenzhou. Finally, the Ming army tried to use fire attack in the sea of Wenzhou Prefecture, but the fire attack failed. The two ships took the opportunity to escape.

In the 45th year of the Wanli reign (1617), General Akashi Michiyo sent Ming official Dong Boqi back to Fujian with gifts, hoping to resume trade with the Ming Dynasty. However, Shen Yourong questioned his aggressive behavior and said, "If you insist on staying in Dongfan, I will not allow you to cross the sea with a single piece of ship or a single piece of silk." Finally, Akashi and his companions were released and sent back to Japan.

== Bibliography ==
- Turnbull, Stephen (2013), Onward, Christian Samurai!, Taylor & Francis
