= Shizuoka =

Shizuoka can refer to:

- Shizuoka Prefecture, a Japanese prefecture
- Shizuoka (city), the capital city of Shizuoka Prefecture
- Shizuoka Airport
- Shizuoka Domain, the name from 1868 to 1871 for Sunpu Domain, a predecessor of Shizuoka Prefecture
