= Yumi Katsura =

Japanese fashion designer (1930–2024)

- 桂 由美
- Born: 24 April 1930; Tokyo, Empire of Japan
- Died: 26 April 2024 (aged 94); Tokyo, Japan
- Education: Kyoritsu Women's University
- Occupations: Fashion designer, bridal fashion
- Notable work: Pope John Paul II’s Easter vestments, 1993
- Spouse: Yoshito Yuki (m. 1972; died 1990)
- Website: www.yumikatsuracouture.com

Yumi Katsura (桂 由美, Katsura Yumi; 24 April 1930 – 26 April 2024) was a Japanese fashion designer, who is best known for designing wedding dresses. She was active in the fashion industry for over five decades, and her work has been featured in various fashion shows and events. Katsura's designs are known for their unique blend of traditional Japanese techniques and French savoir-faire.

== Early life and career ==
Katsura was born on 24 April 1930 in Tokyo, Empire of Japan (now Japan). Her father, who was a government official in the former Ministry of Posts and Telecommunications (now Ministry of Internal Affairs and Communications), and her mother, who founded the dressmaking school (currently Bunka Fashion College). As a child, she loved fairy tales and picture books, and even during the World War II, her mind was filled with world's princes on white horses and beautiful castles. Katsura studied fashion at Kyoritsu Women’s University. After schooling, she taught at her mother's dressmaking school. In 1960 she traveled to Paris to study at École de la chambre syndicale de la couture parisienne.

Katsura claimed to have created over 650,000 dresses over the course of her career. She has also been credited with popularizing the “everyday” kimono in Japan and around the world after the garment began losing popularity in the 1980s. She opened Japan's first bridal store in Akasaka, Tokyo, in December 1964. She built her flagship store in Nogizaka about ten years later. In her early days of designing, Katsura struggled with finding resources such as fabric, lace, and shoes for her designs.

Katsura named Pierre Balmain as one of her mentors and sources of inspiration. The two first met when he visited one of her stores in 1975. In 1981 Katsura participated in her first New York fashion show. Later that decade, in 1987, she established the Yumi Katsura Bridal Museum in Kobe, whose collection includes traditional European wedding dresses collected by Katsura. She opened boutiques in Paris and New York in 2005 and 2006 respectively.

Yumi Katsura designed the Easter vestments worn by Pope John Paul II in 1993.

In 2022, she designed a wedding gown using an ultra-fine silk from Fukushima, Japan. The dress used 55 meters of fabric but weighed only 600 grams.

=== Exhibits ===
One of Katsura's dresses is in the Metropolitan Museum of Art's Costume Institute, located in New York City. In 2018, Katsura became the first designer to exhibit her work at the Akasaka Palace.

=== Books ===
Katsura published more than 20 books on bridal fashion. However, her only book available in English is Yumi Katsura: Behind the Scenes, released in 2019.

== Personal life and death ==
Katsura chose to wear a green velvet dress, rather than a traditional white wedding dress, to her own wedding.

Katsura died at her home in Tokyo, on 26 April 2024, just two days after her 94th birthday.

== Awards ==
Katsura holds the Guinness World Record for most pearls on a wedding dress: 13,262.
