= 1852 in Japan =

- Decades: 1830s; 1840s; 1850s; 1860s; 1870s
- See also: Other events of 1852; History of Japan • Timeline • Years

Events in the year 1852 in Japan.

== Incumbents ==
- Monarch: Kōmei
- Shogun: Tokugawa Ieyoshi

== Births ==
- November 3- Mutsuhito, 122nd Emperor of Japan, child of Emperor Kōmei and Nakayama Yoshiko (d. 1912)
