= Murayama Tōan =

Japanese 17th century magistrate

Murayama Tōan Antonio (村山等安) was a 17th-century Japanese magistrate of the city of Nagasaki (Nagasaki daikan, 長崎代官). He was born in Nagoya from a humble background, and he was a Christian. He played an important role in the handling of "Nanban trade" in Nagasaki with Christian powers, and led an invasion to Taiwan, before being executed by the shogunate's administration for his Christian faith.

== Career in Nagasaki ==
Murayama went to Nagasaki as a youth and was baptized there, receiving the name "Antonio". He was highly successful in various commercial ventures and became very rich. He also became a famous amateur of European food (南蛮料理, "Nanban-Ryori", lit. "Southern Barbarian Cuisine")

Murayama became very influential in Nagasaki, and was nominated as delegate from the municipal council to Toyotomi Hideyoshi in 1592. Hideyoshi took a liking to him, and even changed his first name to "Tōan" because he could not pronounce "Antonio" easily. Hideyoshi nominated Murayama as the local tax farmer.

Murayama had very close connections with the Jesuits. He had one of his sons, Francisco, ordinated as parish priest of Nagasaki in 1602.

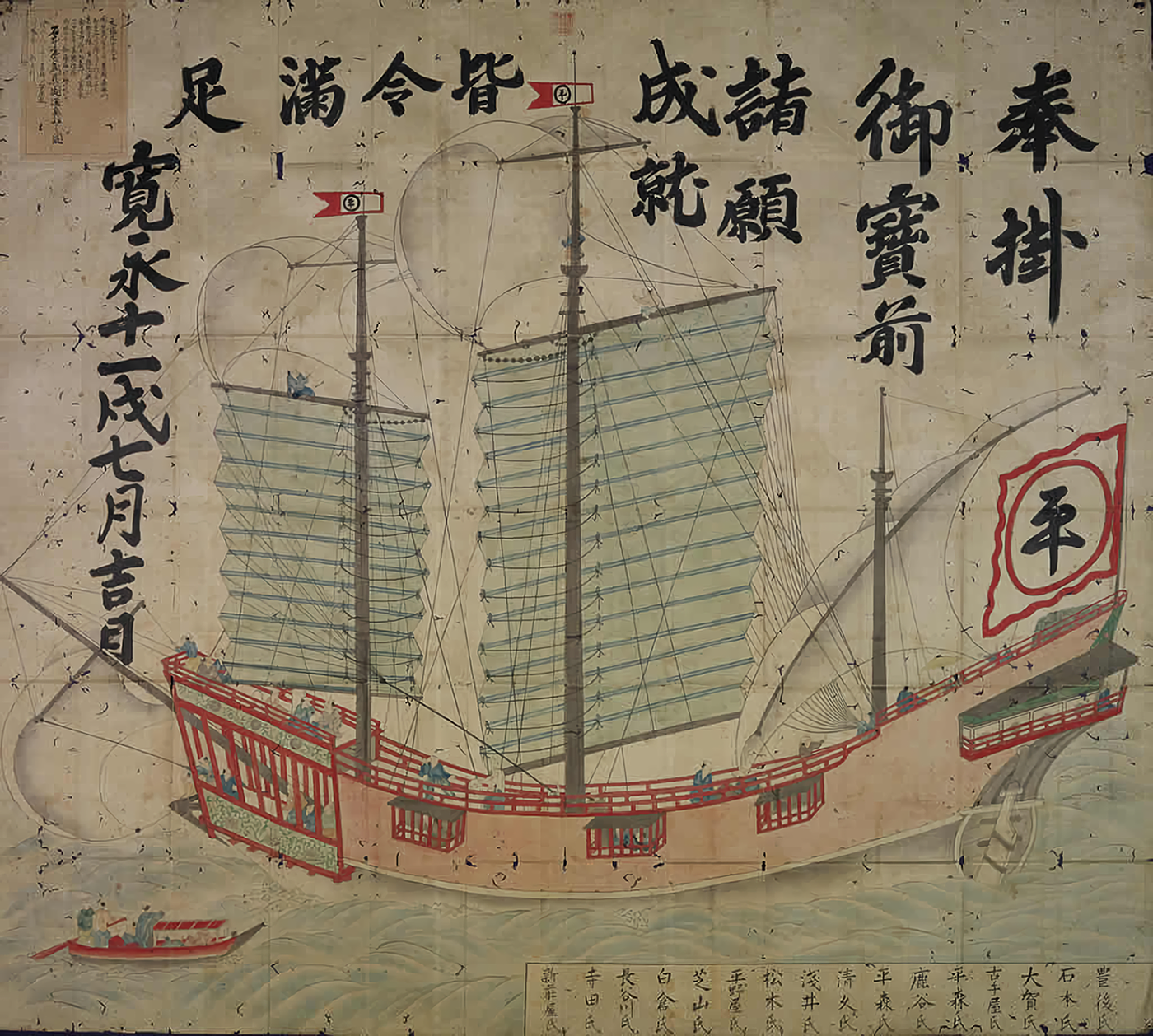
A Japanese Red seal ship. Nagasaki City Museum.

In 1603-1604 Murayama became Magistrate of Nagasaki in place of Terazawa Hirotaka, following disputes on the price of the silk being provided by the Portuguese. Murayama managed to regulate the silk trade with the Portuguese through the introduction of the "bulk-purchase" pancada system (ito-wappu for the Japanese).

Murayama and his colleague Hasegawa Sahioye Fujihiro got into various disputes with the Jesuits and started accusing them of pride and arrogance, of abusive extraterritorial powers in Nagasaki, and of concealing the best silks from Ieyasu. Murayama advocated for the development of direct trading relations between Japan and China, and for the expansion of the Red seal ship system to carry the silk trade.

== Taiwan expedition ==
In 1616, Murayama Tōan was directed by the Tokugawa Shogunate to invade Taiwan. This followed a first exploratory mission by Arima Harunobu in 1609. The objective was to establish a base for the direct supply of silk from China, instead of having to supply it from Portuguese-controlled Macao or Spanish-controlled Manila.

Murayama had a fleet of 13 ships and around 4,000 men, under the command of one of his sons. They left Nagasaki on 15 May 1616. The invasion attempt ended in failure however. A typhoon dispersed the fleet and put an early end to the invasion effort. The king of Ryukyu Sho Nei had warned Ming China of the Japanese intentions to capture the island and to use it as a trading base with China, but in any case only one ship managed to reach the island and it was repelled by local forces. The single ship was ambushed in a creek, and all her crew committed suicide ("seppuku") to avoid capture. Several ships diverted themselves to plunder the Chinese coast and claimed "to have killed above 1,200 Chinese, and taken all the barkes or junks they met withal, throwing the people overboard". The Chinese sunk a Japanese ship.

The other two ships later fled to Jishan, Lushan, Dongchong (now Dongyin Island in the Matsu Islands) and other places in the waters north of Fujian, attacking any ships they encountered. The Ming official Dong Boqi who was conducting reconnaissance was also captured and taken back to Japan.

The other seven ships, after being repaired in Ryukyu, attacked Jinmen Liaoluo, and then attacked Ningde Dajinbao. After passing Penghu and arriving at Taiwan Zhuqian Port, they turned to attack Zhejiang. One of the ships killed 14 Ming soldiers, captured 11 officials, and looted a large ship in Haimen, but the Japanese ship was then sunk by Ming general Shen Yourong (沈有容). Another two ships fled after fighting with the Ming army in Ningbo Prefecture, Zhejiang. Another two ships were chased by more than 40 Ming army ships when attacking Dachen in Taizhou Prefecture and then to the sea of Wenzhou. Finally, the Ming army tried to use fire attack in the sea of Wenzhou Prefecture, but the fire attack failed. The two ships took the opportunity to escape.

In the 45th year of the Wanli reign (1617), General Akashi Michiyo sent Ming official Dong Boqi back to Fujian with gifts, hoping to resume trade with the Ming Dynasty. However, Shen Yourong questioned his aggressive behavior and said, "If you insist on staying in Dongfan, I will not allow you to cross the sea with a single piece of ship or a single piece of silk." Finally, Akashi and his companions were released and sent back to Japan.

== Death ==
In 1618 Murayama Tōan got into a dispute with the Japanese Christian trader Suetsugu Heizō (末次平蔵). Toan first accused Heizo of concealing Jesuits despite the official interdiction, and Heizo accused him of having killed 17 or 18 Japanese from a family who resisted giving him a bride.

Heizo apostatized and at the same time accused Murayama of harbouring Spanish priests and his own clerical sons. Murayama Tōan was finally found to be guilty by the Bakufu and executed in 1619 along with most of his family.

Murayama Toan's eldest son was Murayama Tokuan Andres.
