= 1611 in Japan =

- Decades: 1590s; 1600s; 1610s; 1620s; 1630s
- See also: Other events of 1611; History of Japan • Timeline • Years

Events of the year 1611 in Japan.

== Incumbents ==
- Monarch: Go-Yōzei until May 9, Go-Mizunoo from May 9.
- Shogun: Tokugawa Hidetada

== Events ==
- May 9: Emperor Go-Yōzei abdicates in favor of his son, Prince Kotohito. The prince then assumes the throne as Emperor Go-Mizunoo.
- December 2: 1611 Sanriku earthquake. An 8.1 magnitude earthquake occurs off the coast of Mutsu Province. Both the quake and the resulting tsunami result in the deaths of approximately five thousand people.
- Date unknown: Itoh Gofuku, a predecessor of Matsuzakaya, a famous department store, is founded for the sale of silk in Nagoya.

== Births ==
N/A

== Deaths ==
- January 16: Niiro Tadamoto, samurai, retainer of the Satsuma Domain (b.1526)
- March 5: Shimazu Yoshihisa, daimyo, general, 16th head of the Shimazu clan. (b.1533)
- July 26: Horio Yoshiharu, daimyo of Matsue (1590-1599) (b.1542)
- August 2: Katō Kiyomasa, samurai, daimyo of Kumamoto (1587-1611) (b.1562)
