= Timeline of Japanese history =

The timeline of Japanese history consists of important territorial, cultural, and political events in Japan, which includes its predecessor states. To read about the background to these events, see History of Japan.

== Paleolithic period ==
Year	Date	Event
90,000		The supercolossal eruption of the Aso Caldera ejected approximately 1,000 cubic kilometers (240 cu mi) of tephra, which covered the majority of the Japanese archipelago.
30,000		The supercolossal eruption of the Aira Caldera in Kagoshima deposited a 35 cm (14 in) layer of tephra across Kyushu and southern Honshu, with an additional 10 cm (3.9 in) falling on the Kantō Plain.
14,000		The first settlers of the Japanese archipelago, known as the Jōmon people, arrived. They had a diverse socioeconomic structure consisting of hunter-gatherers and early agriculturalists.

== 3rd century BC ==
Year	Date	Event
300 BC		The mass migration of groups from the Asian continent to the Japanese archipelago marked the transition to the Yayoi period. Japanese society transitioned to a settled agricultural economy. Yayoi immigrants were integrated with the indigenous population, resulting in a synthesis of new cultural influences and existing practices.

== 1st century ==
Year	Date	Event
57		Emperor Guangwu of Han issued the King of Na gold seal to the coalition of Japanese states in northern Kyushu led by the state of Nakoku.

== 2nd century ==
Year	Date	Event
180		The Civil War of Wa ends, bringing shamaness-queen Himiko to power in the Yamatai clan somewhere in either Northern Kyushu or Central Honshu.

== 3rd century ==
Year	Date	Event
201		The Nagata Shrine, Hirota Shrine and Ikuta Shrine, the oldest surviving Shinto shrines in Japan, are founded by the legendary Empress Jingū.
238		Himiko sends the first emissaries from Japan to China.
248		Himiko dies and is succeeded by 13 year old Queen Toyo after a brief civil war. Some rebels, preferring a male successor, fled Yamatai and founded the Miwa court in Nara.
250		The Kofun period and Yamato period starts, which marks the founding of Yamato entity in Nara associated with the Sujin line of emperors.
266		Toyo sends an embassy to Emperor Wu of Jin.
283		The Hata clan, led by Yuzuki no Kimi, settles in Japan, introducing sericulture (silk farming).

== 4th century ==
Year	Date	Event
346		The Makimuku site is abandoned, possibly due to invaders such as Baekje and Gaya confederacy men, indicating large changes of the Miwa court.
350		Unification of Yamato Province.
362		Emperor Chūai of Miwa court is replaced by Emperor Ōjin of Kawachi court (Saki Court), marking the expansion of Yamato Province to the Kinai region.

== 5th century ==
Though very little is known about the 5th century in Japan, it is noted that the period was marked by volatile inter-state warfare, complex alliances, submissions and betrayals. Some of the Yamato polity's partners were Baekje and Gaya confederacy, while enemies included Goguryeo, Silla and various Chinese groups. Few records of the era survive; those that exist are controversial.

Year	Date	Event
404		Goguryeo–Wa conflicts between Wa, Baekje, and Gaya against Goguryeo and Silla
413		King of Wa sends first recorded tribute to the Jin.
430		Yamato polity become a regional power after subjugating several states in West Japan.
461		Chronology of the Japanese historical records becomes consistent. All earlier dated entries are reconstructed from foreign or archaeological sources.
461		Baekje sends an embassy to Japan, as confirmed by both Japanese and Korean records.

== 6th century ==
Year	Date	Event
500		Iron tools become widespread in archeological record, marking the advent of Iron Age in Japan.
507		Kawachi court is succeeded by King Ohoto of Koshi (Keitai line of kings) in Asuka court.
527		With the suppression of the Iwai Rebellion, the Yamato polity is firmly entrenched in Tsukushi Province, Kyushu.
538		Seong of Baekje introduces Buddhism to Japan.
538		The Asuka period starts, and the Imperial capital is transferred to Asuka. Yamato polity achieve de facto political dominance with full conquest of Shikoku and Kyushu islands.
562		The last states of Gaya confederacy are destroyed, marking extinction of Japonic languages outside Japan.
587		The religious war (Soga–Mononobe conflict) ends with the victory of the pro-Buddhist Soga clan.
593		The Soga clan takes control of Japan with the installation of Empress Suiko on the throne.

== 7th century ==
Year	Date	Event
603		Introduction of the Twelve Level Cap and Rank System in Japan
607		The first embassy under the command of Ono no Imoko is sent to Sui China.
630		The first of Japanese missions to Tang China
645		The Asuka period ends with the power of the Soga clan broken in the Isshi incident and Nakatomi clan becoming the dominant power.
646	22 January	The Hakuhō period starts with the Taika Reform.
660		Japanese, under command of Abe no Hirafu, massacre the Mishihase people in Hokkaido. The Japanese do not return to Hokkaido until over 700 years later.
662		Japanese enter the Baekje–Tang War.
663		The Japanese navy is decisively defeated in the Battle of Baekgang, marking the withdrawal of Japan from Korean politics.
665		First coastal defences of Kyushu were built at what is now the Ōnojō Castle Ruins.
668		The Ōmi Code is adopted, starting the Ritsuryō law system.
670		First population census.
672		Succession conflict results in the Jinshin War.
673		With the reign of Emperor Tenmu, Japan becomes an empire.
684		684 Hakuho earthquake, severe tsunami and subsidence at Tosa Province.
689		Asuka Kiyomihara Code, incorporating a citizens registration and pestilence reporting system, is adopted.
694		The Imperial capital is transferred to Fujiwara-kyō.

== 8th century ==
Year	Date	Event
701		The Taihō Code legal system is accepted.
709		The Fort Ideha is established near modern Akita, marking the start of submission of the Emishi people in the Tōhoku region to Japanese.
710		The Nara period starts after Empress Genmei establishes the capital of Heijō-kyō.
711		The law prohibiting nobles from restricting peasant's access to non-agricultural areas is enacted. Stagnation in cultivated land area begins and continues until the 14th century.
712		The Kojiki is completed.
713		The provinces are ordered to compile cultural and geographical records, known as fudoki.
718		Fujiwara no Fuhito compiles the Yōrō Code (the update of Taihō Code) which is accepted in 757.
720		The Nihon Shoki (1st volume of historical chronicles Rikkokushi) is completed.
720	November	Murder of governor Kamitsukenu no Ason Hirohito and subsequent punitive expedition to Mutsu Province.
721		The Hayato rebellion ends after a year and half of fighting, marking the complete subjugation of Southern Kyushu.
721		Severe drought occurs and the government attempts to mitigate it by clearing farmland in the Mutsu Province.
724		Emperor Shōmu was enthroned. Also, the site of the Taga Castle, near to modern Sendai, is founded.
731	April	A fleet of 300 Japanese vessels is defeated on the east coast on Silla.
735		Genbō and Kibi no Makibi return from China.
735		A major smallpox epidemic spreads from Kyushu, resulting in a third of the population perishing, 10 years of social instability and 4 transfers of the Imperial capital through Kuni-kyō, Shigaraki Palace and Naniwa-kyō before returning to Heijō-kyō in 745.
740	28 September	The Fujiwara no Hirotsugu rebellion erupts on Kyushu.
741		Shōmu establishes the provincial temples as a part of shift from Confucianism to Buddhism, impacted by ongoing epidemic and famine.
743		The Ritsuryō law system incorporates the right of eternal land ownership by any squatter in an attempt to mitigate rampant vagrancy.
745		Establishment of the centralized rice tax system.
749		End of first smallpox epidemic.
751		The Kaifūsō poetry anthology is completed.
752		The Great Buddha of Nara at Tōdai-ji is completed with the assistance of Bodhisena from India.
754		Priest Ganjin arrives from China.
757		Fujiwara no Nakamaro defeats an attempt by Tachibana no Naramaro to seize power.
757		The Yōrō Code completes the evolution of Ritsuryō law system.
763		Severe epidemic of unidentified illness begins to spread from the Iki Island.
764		Fujiwara no Nakamaro and Emperor Junnin launches a failed plot against the retired Empress Kōken and the monk Dōkyō.
773		The Thirty-Eight Years War for the subjugation of Tōhoku begins.
781		Emperor Kanmu is enthroned.
784		The Imperial capital moves to Nagaoka-kyō. This was the capital of Japan from 784 to 794. Its location was in Otokuni District, Kyoto, Yamashiro Province.
788		Saichō built Enryaku-ji.
790		Relatively minor smallpox outbreak resulting in large mortality of men aged 30 or below.
794		The first shōgun, Ōtomo no Otomaro, is appointed by Emperor Kanmu in 794 CE. A shōgun was the military dictator of Japan with near absolute power over territories via the military.
794		The Heian period starts after Emperor Kanmu moves the capital to Heian-kyō (ancient name of Kyoto). Emperor Kanmu chooses to relocate the capital in order to distance it from the clerical establishment in Nara.
797		The Shoku Nihongi (2nd volume of historical chronicles Rikkokushi) was completed.

== 9th century ==
Year	Date	Event
802		After the defeat of the Emishi Isawa confederation and execution of Aterui in the final stages of Thirty-Eight Years War, the Japanese control the entire Honshu island.
806		The Japanese kana scripts (invention popularly attributed to Kūkai) have evolved as distinct from Chinese characters.
809		Emperor Saga ascends to the throne, resulting in a 32-year long relatively peaceful period.
810		The Kusuko incident, abortive attempt by retired Emperor Heisei to seize power and return the capital to Heijō-kyō.
814		Second major outbreak of smallpox epidemic killing "nearly half" of the Japanese population.
814		Emperor Saga's 7th son is demoted to commoner status under the name Minamoto no Makoto, starting the Minamoto clan.
815		Shinsen Shōjiroku, the first compilation of Japanese genealogical data, is completed.
815		The Kōnin Code, a land reform promoting land reclamation and large-scale landed estates, is issued.
823		Emperor Junna ascends to the throne.
829	23 January	Kūkai establishes the first public school in Japan.
829		Emperor Ninmyō ascends to the throne.
835		Death of Kūkai.
839		Last envoy to Tang China sent (some later embassies were cancelled).
840		Nihon Kōki (3rd volume of historical chronicles Rikkokushi) was completed.
842		The Jōwa incident marks the rising power of the Fujiwara clan.
842		Emperor Montoku ascends to the throne.
853	February	Minor outbreak of smallpox. Outbreaks continue with average interval of 30 years until smallpox becomes endemic by 1061.
855		Large-scale insurrection by the Emishi people of northern Japan.
857		Large-scale insurrection by Tsushima Province.
858		The Fujiwara clan solidify their rule over Japan with the installation of Emperor Seiwa; Fujiwara no Yoshifusa becomes Sesshō.
859		Construction begins on Iwashimizu Hachiman-gū.
869		Shoku Nihon Kōki (4th volume of historical chronicles Rikkokushi) was completed.
869	9 July	Devastating 869 Sanriku earthquake and tsunami occur off the Tohoku coast.
866		Ōtenmon Incident.
876		Emperor Yōzei ascends to the throne.
878	March	Akita Castle is overrun during the Gangyou disturbance with the background of heavy drought and famine, resulting in growing independence of Dewa Province.
879		Nihon Montoku Tennō Jitsuroku (5th volume of historical chronicles Rikkokushi) was completed.
884		Emperor Yōzei is deposed; he is replaced by Emperor Kōkō.
887		Ninna earthquake.
887		Emperor Uda ascends to the throne; Ako Controversy around edict issued naming Fujiwara no Mototsune as Kanpaku.
894		Sugawara no Michizane advocates for ending Japanese embassies to China.
897		Emperor Daigo ascends to the throne.

== 10th century ==
Year	Date	Event
901		Nihon Sandai Jitsuroku (6th and last of historical chronicles Rikkokushi) was completed.
907		Severe epidemics and extreme weather including floods and drought, popularly attributed to persecution of Sugawara no Michizane
935		The Tosa Nikki, the oldest surviving Japanese diary, is written.
939		Tengyō no Ran – the failed rebellion of Taira no Masakado in Hitachi Province and Shimōsa Province, Fujiwara no Sumitomo in Iyo Province and San'yō region, plus opportunistic uprisings in Dewa Province – the first of many rebellions led by professional warriors (samurai), has led to the downfall of the Tachibana clan.
949		The 56 warrior monks of Tōdai-ji stage the public protest, marking the formation of sōhei class and militarization of temples.
984		The Ishinpō, the oldest surviving Japanese medical manual, is compiled.
995		An unprecedented scale epidemic ravages Heian-kyō, killing many nobles on the background of sectarian strife.

== 11th century ==
Year	Date	Event
1008		Murasaki Shikibu writes The Tale of Genji.
1019		Toi invasion to northern Kyushu.
1028		Taira no Tadatsune starts a three-years-long war in present-day Chiba Prefecture before surrendering.
1051		The Former Nine Years' War (Zenkunen War) against rebellious Abe clan in present-day Tohoku begins.
1069		The Ritsuryō system has completely failed due to encroachment by private manors. Emperor Go-Sanjō land reform attempt was thwarted by Fujiwara no Yorimichi, signaling the terminal decline of imperial power.
1074		The unification of units of volume measurement.
1083		The fighting in Tohoku flares up again, resulting in the Gosannen War (Later Three-Year War).

== 12th century ==
Year	Date	Event
1156		The Hōgen rebellion has marked the rise of the samurai class.
1159		The Heiji rebellion has been defeated, and Taira clan under control of Taira no Kiyomori is dominating the government of Japan – the first example of samurai rule.
1177		Shishigatani incident – an attempted rebellion against Taira clan rule.
1180		The Genpei War starts. As result, the Imperial capital is briefly moved to Fukuhara-kyō.
1181		Severe drought created the Yōwa famine.
1185		The Kamakura period starts after the Genpei War ends with the defeat of the Taira clan, resulting in establishment of the Kamakura shogunate.
1189	15 June	The Battle of Koromo River have ended de facto independence of the Northern Fujiwara clan in Tōhoku. As result, first Japanese refugees have settled in Kaminokuni, Hokkaido.
1192		Kamakura became the de facto capital of Japan in about 1180 AD, following the victories of the Minamoto over the Taira. It officially became the capital in 1192 when Minamoto Yoritomo was declared shōgun.
1192		Minamoto no Yoritomo seized power from the central government and the aristocracy and established a feudal system based in Kamakura. The samurai gained political power over the aristocratic nobility (kuge) of the Imperial Court in Kyoto. Minamoto no Yoritomo was awarded the title of Sei-i Taishōgun by Emperor Go-Toba. The Emperor became a figurehead. The political system that Yoritomo developed with a succession of shōguns as the head became known as a shogunate. The military class would rule Japan near continuously from 1192 till 1868 CE.

== 13th century ==
Year	Date	Event
1221		Jōkyū War – an attempt of Imperial family to regain independence from the Kamakura shogunate
1230-1231		Kanki famine
1232		The Goseibai Shikimoku code accepted and used until the Edo period, marking militarization of legal system
1274		1st Mongol invasion in Japan repulsed in the Battle of Bun'ei
1281		2nd Mongol invasion in Japan repulsed in the Battle of Kōan
1293	27 May	The deadly 1293 Kamakura earthquake, followed by government in-fighting, struck Japan.

== 14th century ==
Year	Date	Event
1331		Emperor Go-Daigo initiates the Genkō War.
1333	5 July	The short-lived Kenmu Restoration starts with the destruction of the Kamakura shogunate in the siege of Kamakura (1333).
1334		Imperial court of Japan splits in two until 1392, resulting in the Nanboku-chō period.
1336		The Muromachi period starts with the establishment of the Ashikaga shogunate domination over the imperial Northern Court. The Daimyō system is established.
1341		The Jinnō Shōtōki is written, formalizing Emperor's of Japan role transition from ruler to the mystical symbol.
1348	4 February	The Southern Court loses the Battle of Shijōnawate.
1350		Kannō disturbance weakens the Ashikaga shogunate. Wokou pirates from Japan are becoming rampant in region.
1353		The Southern Court wins the Battle of Yawata, enabling the siege of Kyoto in 1354.
1368		De facto independence of the Kantō region.
1370		De facto independence of Kyushu.
1392		The Nanboku-chō period ends with the subjugation of the Southern Court to the Northern Court.

== 15th century ==
Year	Date	Event
1419	19 June	Ōei Invasion of the Wokou bases on Tsushima Island.
1428		Cholera epidemic and extreme impoverishment in now Shiga Prefecture have resulted in the Shocho uprising.
1438		Flare-up of Eikyō disturbance in the Kantō region after 22 years of confrontation between local lords and shogunate
1443		The Treaty of Gyehae was signed, resulting in Wokou pirates becoming increasingly non-Japanese.
1454		The Kyōtoku incident starts the 32 years of instability and bloodshed in the semi-independent Kantō region.
1457		Takeda Nobuhiro emerged victorious after repelling an Ainu assault on Kaminokuni, Hokkaido, marking the beginning of Japanese conquest of Hokkaido.
1457		Edo Castle was built.
1459		Bad handling of the Kanshō famine in the aftermath of flood and plague in Kyoto has resulted in increasing divisions of society.
1467		The Ōnin War starts, marking the beginning of the Sengoku period – during which violence and power struggle has become the norm.
1477		Kyoto has been completely destroyed. Iga Province by this point has successfully rejected the authority of the local shugo.
1485		The Yamashiro uprising establishes the Yamashiro ikki,
1487		Battle of Magari: Rokkaku Takayori, supported by ninja from Iga ikki and Kōka ikki, defeats an expedition from Shogun Ashikaga Yoshihisa.
1488		The Kaga Rebellion overthrows Togashi Masachika and establishes a theocratic confederation, the Kaga ikki, in now-Ishikawa Prefecture.
1493		The Ashikaga shogunate destroys the Yamashiro ikki.
1498	20 September	1498 Nankai earthquake

== 16th century ==
Year	Date	Event
1523		Japanese in-fighting results in the Ningbo incident, bringing trade with China to a halt and resulting in a new wave of Wokou piracy.
1540		Tenbun famine and plague
1543	25 August	The first Europeans, the Portuguese, arrive at Japan, opening the Nanban trade period.
1560		Battle of Okehazama: Oda Nobunaga emerged victorious.
1570		Oda Nobunaga starts a 10-year long Ishiyama Hongan-ji War to suppress the warrior monk community and the Kaga ikki state.
1573		Japanese society begins to stabilize, starting the Azuchi–Momoyama period under the rule of Oda Nobunaga and later Toyotomi Hideyoshi.
1574		The Rokkaku clan and Kōka ikki surrender to Nobunaga. The Iga–Kōka alliance is thus terminated.
1579		Azuchi religious debate results in enforced religious tolerance.
1581		Oda Nobunaga forces win the Tenshō Iga War, destroying the Iga ikki.
1581		Himeji Castle, the largest in Japan, was built.
1582		Honnō-ji incident: Akechi Mitsuhide betrays Oda Nobunaga who commits suicide
1585		Toyotomi Hideyoshi invaded Shikoku.
1586		The 1586 Tenshō earthquake strikes central Honshu, killing thousands.
1587		Toyotomi Hideyoshi launches the Kyūshū campaign.
1590	4 August	Toyotomi Hideyoshi prevails over the Late Hōjō clan in the siege of Odawara in the Kantō region, completing the re-unification of Japan.
1591	8 October	The Separation Edict and Population Census Edict froze the social structure of Japan.
1592	23 May	Toyotomi Hideyoshi, acting as kampaku (regent) in lieu of Oda Nobukatsu, invaded Korea.
1597	5 February	26 Martyrs of Japan were crucified in Nagasaki in the aftermath of the San Felipe incident.
1598	16 December	The Japanese invasions of Korea (1592–1598) have ended with Japanese retreat after the Battle of Noryang.
1600	21 October	The Battle of Sekigahara is won by forces of Tokugawa Ieyasu.

== 17th century ==
Year	Date	Event
1603	24 March	The Edo period starts after Tokugawa Ieyasu received from Emperor Go-Yōzei the title of shōgun.
1603		The town of Edo became the de facto capital of Japan and center of political power. This was after Tokugawa Ieyasu established the bakufu headquarters in Edo. Kyoto remained the formal capital of the country.
1603	November	Rokugō Rebellion
1605	3 February	1605 Nankai earthquake and tsunami
1605		Ieyasu abdicated from office in favor of his third son and heir, Tokugawa Hidetada.
1609	7 March	Invasion of Ryukyu
1610	3 January	Nossa Senhora da Graça incident
1611	2 December	1611 Sanriku earthquake and tsunami
1615	3 June	The siege of Osaka is complete with the Battle of Tennōji: Tokugawa Ieyasu ended Toyotomi opposition.
1623		Hidetada resigned his office to his eldest son and heir, Tokugawa Iemitsu.
1635		The Sakoku Edict of 1635 was issued by the Tokugawa shogunate. This isolationist foreign policy barred Japanese from leaving Japan and barred Europeans from entering, on pain of death. It instituted strict penalties for the practice of Catholicism and severely restricted foreign trade.
1635		The policy of sankin-kōtai was established, which subjected the daimyōs to the will of the shōgun.
1637	17 December	Shimabara Rebellion: A rebellion began against the daimyō Matsukura Katsuie over his persecution of Christianity and onerous tax code.
1638	15 April	Shimabara Rebellion: The last of the rebels were defeated in their fortress at Shimabara.
1642		The Kan'ei Great Famine happens due to a combination of government over-spending, Rinderpest epizootic, volcanic eruptions and extreme weather.
1651	24 April	Iemitsu died, leaving his office to the ten-year-old Tokugawa Ietsuna.
1651		Keian Uprising: A coup d'état attempted by several rōnin and masterminded by Yui Shōsetsu and Marubashi Chūya failed.
1657	2 March	Great Fire of Meireki in Edo
1669		Shakushain's revolt on Hokkaido
1680	4 June	Ietsuna died and was succeeded by his younger brother, Tokugawa Tsunayoshi.
1686		Jōkyō uprising

== 18th century ==
Year	Date	Event
1703	20 March	Chūshingura – Forty-seven rōnin were ordered to commit seppuku by the shōgun.
1703	31 December	1703 Genroku earthquake and tsunami
1707	28 October	1707 Hōei earthquake and tsunami, followed by the Hōei eruption of Mount Fuji
1709	19 February	Tsunayoshi died. His nephew Tokugawa Ienobu succeeded him as shōgun.
1712		The Wakan Sansai Zue, the first Japanese encyclopaedia, was published.
1712	12 November	Ienobu died and was succeeded by his five-year-old son, Tokugawa Ietsugu, under the regency of the shōgun's adviser Arai Hakuseki.
1716	19 June	Ietsugu died. Tokugawa Yoshimune, a great-grandson of Tokugawa Ieyasu, became shōgun.
1716	July	The Kyōhō Reforms aimed for monetization of economy and broader import of European knowledge have started.
1720		The foreign books restrictions are reduced, starting a Rangaku practice.
1732		The Kyōhō famine happens due to a locust infestation in the Seto Inland Sea region.
1745		Yoshimune retired, leaving his public office to his eldest son Tokugawa Ieshige, although he maintained some influence in the affairs of state.
1754		1754 Horeki River incident
1760		Ieshige retired, leaving his office to his eldest son Tokugawa Ieharu.
1771	9 January	Empress Go-Sakuramachi abdicated in favor of her nephew Go-Momozono. She was the last empress regnant of Japan up until now.
1771	24 April	1771 Great Yaeyama Tsunami
1782		Great Tenmei famine
1783	5 August	Tenmei eruption of Mount Asama
1789	May	Menashi–Kunashir rebellion on Hokkaido
1790		The Kansei Reforms, including the Kansei Edict, tighten the isolation of Japan.
1792	21 May	1792 Unzen earthquake and tsunami

== 19th century ==
Year	Date	Event
1806		Khvostov raids on the Japanese-controlled Kuril Islands.
1807		Failed military expedition to Sakhalin
1811		The Golovnin Incident marks increasing contacts with the Russian Empire.
1825		Edict to Repel Foreign Vessels
1833		Tenpō famine
1837		Morrison incident
1842		Tenpō Reforms lifts the price controls and further reduce contacts with Europeans.
1846	10 March	Emperor Ninkō died at the age of 45 and was succeeded by Emperor Kōmei.
1847	8 May	1847 Zenkoji earthquake
1848	1 July	The isolation policy of the Tokugawa shogunate has begun to crumble by the time of landing of Ranald MacDonald on Rishiri Island.
1853	14 July	Matthew C. Perry arrives off the coast of Japan in four ships. Perry orders harbor buildings to be shelled to force negotiations for a letter President Millard Fillmore sent to the ruler of Japan. This incident was coined as the "Arrival of the Black Ships" in Japanese history.
1854	February	Matthew C. Perry returns to Japan with eight Black Ships and finds that the shogunate had prepared a treaty accepting virtually all demands from President Millard Fillmore.
1854	31 March	The Convention of Kanagawa was signed. Within 5 years, Japan signs similar treaties with other western countries, thus ending an isolation period of more than 200 years known as sakoku (鎖国), whereby the Dutch and Chinese ships had limited trade exclusivity.
1854	23 December	The Ansei great earthquakes series starts with the 1854 Tōkai earthquake and tsunami.
1855	7 February	The Treaty of Shimoda with the Russian Empire was signed.
1855	25 August	With the arrival of the modern Dutch paddle steamer Kankō Maru, the Tokugawa shogunate establishes the Nagasaki Naval Training Center as part of its modernization efforts to meet the perceived military threat posed by the western nations and learn Western-style science and naval theory. The cadets who attended the center such as Enomoto Takeaki and Katsu Kaishū would go on to found the Imperial Japanese Navy following the Meiji Restoration in 1868.
1855	11 November	The Ansei great earthquakes series ends with the 1855 Edo earthquake followed by a devastating fire.
1858	26 August	The Anglo-Japanese Treaty of Amity and Commerce and other Ansei Treaties were signed, resulting in Ansei Purge.
1860	9 February	Ambassador Shinmi Masaoki sets sail for San Francisco, leading the first Japanese diplomatic mission to the United States.
1860	17 March	The Japanese ship Kanrin Maru arrives in San Francisco with the delegation, marking the first official visit to a foreign state following the end of its 214-year isolationist policy, demonstrating the degree to which Japan had mastered Western navigation techniques and ship technologies in the 6 years since opening its borders.
1862	14 September	Namamugi Incident: Four British subjects were attacked by guards on the Tōkaidō for failing to pay proper respect to a daimyo. One, a merchant named Charles Lennox Richardson, was killed.
1863	11 March	Order to expel barbarians
1863	16 July	Battle of Shimonoseki Straits
1863	15 August	Bombardment of Kagoshima
1863	29 September	Tenchūgumi incident - the year-long rebellion in Yamato Province starts.
1864	May	The Mito Rebellion starts in Mito Domain and continues until January 1865.
1864	20 August	Kinmon incident - an attempt to kidnap an Emperor Kōmei, resulting in partial burning of Kyoto. It was retaliated by the abortive First Chōshū expedition.
1866	7 June	The Second Chōshū expedition starts, only to be halted after death of shogun Tokugawa Iemochi in August 1866, critically discrediting the Tokugawa shogunate.
1867	30 January	Emperor Kōmei died at the age of 35. It's generally believed due to the smallpox epidemic. This marked the end of the Edo period.
1867	13 February	Emperor Meiji ascended the Chrysanthemum Throne. This marked the start of the Meiji Period.

== Meiji period (1868–1912) ==
Year	Date	Event
1868	3 January	Meiji Restoration restored practical abilities and the political system under Emperor Meiji. This ended the Tokugawa Shogunate.
1868	1868 to 1869	Boshin War was fought between forces of the ruling Tokugawa shogunate and those seeking to return political power to the Imperial Court.
1869		The city of Edo was formally renamed to Tokyo ("eastern capital"). The city of Tokyo was officially established.
1869	1 May	Emperor Meiji moved his residence from Kyoto to Tokyo. Edo castle became the Imperial Palace. This made Tokyo the formal capital of Japan.
1871		Abolition of Han system, being replaced by a system of Japanese prefectures.
1873		Seikanron: Japanese government debated and rejected the idea of the invasion of Korea.
1873		Land Tax Reform (Japan 1873)
1874	16 February to 9 April	Saga Rebellion
1874	6 May to 3 December	Mudan incident in Greater China.
1875		Japan quickly transformed in one generation from an isolated feudal society to a modern industrialized nation state and an emerging great power.
1876		Akizuki, Hagi and Shinpūren Rebellions.
1877		Satsuma Rebellion.
1878	23 August	Takebashi incident: A riot by underpaid Imperial Guards.
1884		Chichibu incident: A peasants rebellion.
1890	29 November	The Constitution of the Empire of Japan (Meiji Constitution) was enacted. This turned Japan into a quasi-absolute monarchy with a representative democracy.
1891	28 October	1891 Mino–Owari earthquake: A strongest recorded inland earthquake of Japan.
1894	1 August	First Sino-Japanese War starts.
1895	17 April	The First Sino-Japanese War is won by the Japanese, resulting in the Treaty of Shimonoseki. It was the first major conflict between Japan and an overseas military power in modern times. For the first time, regional dominance in East Asia shifted from China to Japan. Korea became a vassal state of Japan.
1895	29 May	Japanese invasion of Taiwan (1895)
1896	15 June	Sanriku earthquake kills 22,066 people.
1902	30 January	Russo-Japanese War: Japan became the first Asian nation to sign a mutual defense pact with a European nation, Britain.
1904	8 February	Russo-Japanese War: Japan launched a surprise torpedo attack on the Imperial Russian Navy at Port Arthur.
1905	5 September	Russo-Japanese War: Japan became the first modern Asian nation to win a war against an Eastern European nation (Russia). The Treaty of Portsmouth was signed, ceding some Russian property and territory to Japan and ending the war. Pro-war activists staged the Hibiya incendiary incident nevertheless. This changed the global world order. Japan became the main Asian power.
1910	22 August	Japan–Korea Treaty completes the annexation of the Korean Empire.
1910	December	Japanese Antarctic Expedition starts.
1912	30 July	Emperor Meiji died of kidney failure and ulcerative colitis at the age of 59.

== Taisho period (1912–1926) ==
Year	Date	Event
1912	30 July	Prince Taisho becomes as the Emperor of Japan, marking the start of the Taishō period.
1914	5 to 6 September	Japanese seaplane carrier Wakamiya conducts the world's first successful naval-launched air raids on 5 September 1914 and during the first months of World War I from Jiaozhou Bay off Qingdao. The first air-sea battle in history took place on 6 September 1914.
1914	31 October	The siege of Qingdao starts as part of World War I.
1915	18 January	Japan sends the Twenty-One Demands to China.
1917		Kogyo Shoyuken Senji Ho, the Wartime Law on Industrial Property, is enacted.
1917	2 November	Lansing–Ishii Agreement goes into effect.
1918	January 1918 to April 1920	Spanish flu pandemic began to devastate Japan, which killed 400,000 people.
1918	4 April	Japanese intervention in Siberia starts and continues until 1922.
1918	July to September	Rice riots of 1918
1918	July	Siberian intervention is launched.
1919	1 March	March 1st Movement begins to invigorate the Korean independence movement.
1920		Japan helps found the League of Nations.
1921	13 November	Hōshō, the first Japanese aircraft carrier, is launched.
1921	29 November	Crown Prince Hirohito becomes regent because his father, Emperor Taisho, contracts a serious illness.
1921	13 December	Four-Power Treaty is signed with America, Britain, and France.
1922	6 February	Five Power Naval Disarmament Treaty is signed.
1922	28 August	Japan withdraws troops from Siberia.
1923	1 September	Great Kanto earthquake kills 140,000 people.
1924	26 January	Crown Prince Hirohito (Future Emperor Shōwa) marries Princess Nagako of Kuni (Future Empress Nagako).
1925	5 May	General Election Law is passed and all men above age 25 gain the right to vote.
1926	25 December	Emperor Taishō dies of a heart attack at the age of 47 after developing pneumonia.

== Showa period (1926–1989) ==
Year	Date	Event
1926	25 December	Prince Hirohito becomes the Emperor of Japan after the death of his father Yoshihito. This marks the start of Shōwa period, and the last period of the Empire of Japan (during the final year of World War II).
1927	January to April	Shōwa financial crisis begins.
1927	30 December	Tokyo Metro Ginza Line between Ueno and Asakusa is built.
1928	3 to 11 May	Jinan incident.
1928	28 June	Huanggutun incident.
1930	27 October	Wushe incident, a rebellion on Taiwan, which was the last major uprising against colonial Japanese forces in Taiwan.
1931	18 September	Japan invaded Manchuria in the aftermath of Mukden incident in Northeastern China.
1932	1 March	Manchukuo, a puppet state of Japan, is established.
1932	28 January to 3 March	Shanghai incident begins and lasts only two months.
1932	15 May	Prime Minister Inukai Tsuyoshi is assassinated during the Japanese coup d'état.
1936	26 to 28 February	Prime Minister Keisuke Okada survives the February 26 incident. However, he left office one month later.
1937	7 July	Second Sino-Japanese War begins.
1937	13 August to 26 November	Battle of Shanghai begins.
1939	13 September to 8 October	Battle of Changsha begins in Hunan Province, China.
1940	16 March to 3 April	Battle of Wuyuan begins.
1940	1 May to 18 June	Battle of Zaoyang-Yichang begins.
1940	22 September	Japanese invasion of French Indochina begins.
1941	13 April	Soviet–Japanese Neutrality Pact is signed.
1941	7 December	The Empire of Japan attacks the naval base in Pearl Harbor, Hawaii. Japan declares war on the United States, the Kingdom of the Netherlands and the United Kingdom, marking the start of the Pacific War theatre of World War II.
1941	8 to 10 December	First Battle of Guam begins.
1941	8 to 25 December	Battle of Hong Kong begins in China.
1942	12 January	Japan declares war on the Netherlands.
1942	22 January	Hideki Tōjō warns Australia with the statement: "If you continue resistance, Japanese will destroy you."
1942	February	Japan demands the surrender of Singapore.
1942	20 March	The naval minister Admiral Shigetarō Shimada says that in view of the Allies' "retaliation and hatred", Japan would no longer follow recognized rules of sea warfare.
1942	18 April	Doolittle Raid is the first bombing raid on Japanese home islands.
1942	4 to 7 June	Battle of Midway begins.
1943	14 January to 8 February	Operation Ke, a Japanese naval operation which was intended as the reconnaissance of Pearl Harbor and disruption of repair and salvage operations, takes place following the surprise attack at two years ago.
1943	29 January to 4 February	Battle of Wau begins in the eastern parts of New Guinea.
1944	15 June to 9 July	Battle of Saipan begins in the Mariana Islands.
1944	15 to 16 June	Bombing of Yawata begins in Kyoto Prefecture.
1944	19 to 20 June	Battle of the Philippine Sea begins.
1944	21 July to 10 August	Second Battle of Guam begins.
1944	10 to 20 October	Formosa Air Battle begins.
1944	30 to 31 December	Battle of Pearl Ridge begins.
1945	18 February	U.S. Marines land on Iwo Jima.
1945	10 March and 24 May	Two Bombings of Tokyo begins.
1945	26 March	American Armed Forces win the Battle of Iwo Jima, defeating the last remaining troops led by Tadamichi Kuribayashi.
1945	6 and 9 August	Atomic bombing of Hiroshima and Nagasaki in Japan during the final period of World War II.
1945	8 August	Soviet invasion of Manchuria starts and continues on as the Kuril Islands dispute.
1945	15 August	Surrender of Japan; Last Allied bombing of Japan takes place in Odawara and Tsuchizaki. Emperor Hirohito declares Japan's acceptance of the Potsdam Declaration following the surrender of Japan at the end of war.
1946	1 January	During the New Year's Day, Emperor Shōwa renounces his divinity, known in Japanese as the Human Declaration.
1946	4 January	Just five months after his arrival in Japan, the Supreme Commander of the Allied Powers, General Douglas MacArthur orders the Japanese government to expel all militarists from positions of power. The disbandment of all ultra-nationalist organizations is also demanded.
1946	2 March	Kose Cosmetics is founded in Oji region, Tokyo, as predecessor name was Kobayashi Kose Cosmetics.
1946	22 April	Sazae-san is first published.
1946	3 May	In the controversial International Military Tribunal for the Far East, the prosecution began of Japanese military leaders for war crimes.
1946	7 May	Tokyo Tsushin Kogyo, the predecessor of Sony, is founded.
1946	16 May	Shigeru Yoshida receives Imperial Order to form a cabinet.
1946	22 May	Yoshida's cabinet is announced.
1946	20 June	Emperor Hirohito submits a revision of the Imperial Constitution to the National Diet.
1946	16 August	Keidanren is established.
1946	3 November	Constitution of Japan is promulgated.
1947	3 March	Sekisui Chemical is founded.
1947	3 May	The Constitution of Japan goes into the effect. This country will start the transition from the Empire of Japan to the State of Japan (Nihon Koku, 日本国) with a Liberal Democracy. The Article 9 turned Japan into a pacifist country without a military, known as East Asia or Asia-Pacific country.
1947	4 August	Supreme Court of Japan is established.
1951	8 September	American occupation of Japan ended after the signing of the Treaty of San Francisco and Security Treaty between United States of America and the State of Japan, which became effective on 28 April 1952. It restored the sovereignty of Japan and established America-Japan alliance.
1954	1 July	Formation of Japan Ground Self-Defense Force (GSDF), Japan Maritime Self-Defense Force (JMSDF), and Japan Air Self-Defense Force (JASDF).
1955		Japanese economic miracle begins.
1955	15 November	The right-wing and nationalist Liberal Democratic Party, which has ruled Japan almost continuously ever since its foundation, is formed.
1956	12 December	Japan joins the United Nations.
1960	June	The massive Anpo protests against revision of the America–Japan Security Treaty are the largest protests in Japan's modern history, and force the resignation of Prime Minister Nobusuke Kishi and the cancellation of a planned visit by US president Dwight D. Eisenhower.
1964	1 October	A largest Japanese land reclamation project thus far was completed in Lake Hachirōgata, creating the village of Ōgata out of 195 km^{2} of lakebed reclaimed since 1957.
1964	1 October	The first Shinkansen high-speed train railway line was opened.
1964	10 October	1964 Summer Olympics: Tokyo hosted the Summer Olympic Games, marking the first time the Games were held in Asia-Pacific.
1968		Japan surpasses West Germany as the second-largest economic power in the world.
1968		The Ogasawara Islands are returned from American occupation to Japanese sovereignty. Japanese citizens are allowed to return.
1969	18 January	Japanese student protests against the Vietnam War and American use of bases on Japanese soil culminate in a short-lived takeover of University of Tokyo.
1970	11 February	The first successful launch of the Lambda 4S rocket places the Japanese Ohsumi satellite in orbit.
1970	20 December	The violent and spontaneous Koza riot takes place against the US military presence in Okinawa.
1970		By the 1970s Japan ascended to great power status once more. Japan sees record high economic growth during the Japanese economic miracle.
1971	30 September	Zengakuren demonstrate and riot in Tokyo against terms for the return of Okinawa from US to Japanese control. They wanted to remove all American military presence.
1971	24 November	The 1971 Okinawa Reversion Agreement is ratified and returns the Okinawa Prefecture to Japanese sovereignty.
1974		Prime Minister Eisaku Satō accepts the Nobel Peace Prize.
1980		Japan became the biggest motor vehicle producing country in the world with 11,042,884 motor vehicles compared to the USA's 8,009,841.
1983		The domestic North American video game market crashes, allowing Japanese industry to take America's place as the world's largest video game market.
1985	12 August	Japan Air Lines Flight 123 crashes near Mount Takamagahara, killing 520 people in Japan's worst ever air disaster.
1989	7 January	Emperor Hirohito dies of cancer at the age of 87.

== Heisei period (1989–2019) ==
Year	Date	Event
1989	7 January	After Hirohito's death from cancer, his posthumous name is Emperor Shōwa. He was the both longest-lived and longest-reigning historical Japanese emperor, as well as the longest-reigning monarch in the world at that time of his death. Crown Prince Akihito succeeded to the Chrysanthemum Throne upon the death of his father becoming the emperor of Japan. This marked the start of the Heisei period.
1989	29 December	During Japanese asset price bubble, Tokyo Stock Market index, Nikkei 225, hits its peak at 38,957 before closing at 38,916 for the day.
1991	1 January	Japanese asset price bubble has been popped, ending the Japanese economic miracle and triggering the prolonged period of economic decline known as the "Lost Decades".
1993	12 July	1993 Okushiri earthquake kills 230 people, but no injuries.
1993	18 July	In the wake of Japanese economic crisis, the ruling Liberal Democratic Party is defeated in the general elections for the first time since 1955, and the coalition of opposition parties headed by Morihiro Hosokawa takes power.
1995	17 January	Great Hanshin earthquake: Kansai region earthquake kills 6,434 people and more than 43,792 injured.
1995	20 March	Tokyo subway sarin attack: Members of the Aum Shinrikyo religious sect release sarin gas on the Tokyo subway system, killing 13 and injuring over 1000.
1997	11 December	The Kyoto Protocol, to reduce greenhouse gas emissions, was adopted.
2000	5 April	Prime Minister Keizō Obuchi has a mild stroke and resigns. Yoshirō Mori becomes 90th Prime Minister of Japan.
2000	14 May	Prime Minister Keizō Obuchi dies of a mild stroke at the hospital in Tokyo at the age of 62.
2001	26 April	Prime Minister Yoshirō Mori resigned and Junichiro Koizumi become 91st Prime Minister of Japan.
2001	29 July	Prime Minister Junichiro Koizumi won the House of Councillors election.
2002	31 May-30 June	2002 FIFA World Cup are held in Japan and South Korea.
2003	9 November	Prime Minister Junichiro Koizumi won the general elections at the second time.
2003	9 December	Japan send troops to Iraq during the Iraq War (2003–11). However, a year later, Japan was established Japanese Iraq Reconstruction and Support Group between 2004 and 2006.
2004	11 July	Prime Minister Junichiro Koizumi won the House of Councillors election.
2004	23 October	2004 Chūetsu earthquake kills 68 people and more than 4,805 injured.
2005	11 September	Prime Minister Junichiro Koizumi won the general elections at the third time.
2005	November	Japan Aerospace Exploration Agency (JAXA)'s robotic spacecraft Hayabusa landed on an asteroid and collected samples in the form of tiny grains of asteroidal material, which were returned to Earth aboard the spacecraft on 13 June 2010. It was the first spacecraft in history designed to deliberately land on an asteroid and then take off again. The Hayabusa mission was the first to return an asteroid sample to Earth for analysis.
2006	26 September	Prime Minister Junichiro Koizumi resigns and Shinzo Abe becomes 92nd Prime Minister of Japan.
2007	29 July	Prime Minister Shinzo Abe resigns due to lost his power in the House of Councillors election to Ichirō Ozawa.
2007	26 September	Yasuo Fukuda become 93rd Prime Minister of Japan following Shinzo Abe lost the House of Councillors election and his resignation.
2008	January–December	Japan is severely affected by the 2008 financial crisis and the Great Recession.
2008	24 September	Prime Minister Yasuo Fukuda resigned and Tarō Asō become 94th Prime Minister of Japan.
2009	30 August	Prime Minister Yasuo Fukuda lost his election to Democratic Party leader Yukio Hatoyama.
2009	16 September	Yukio Hatoyama was elected 95th Prime Minister of Japan.
2010	8 June	Prime Minister Yukio Hatoyama resigned and Naoto Kan become the 96th Prime Minister of Japan.
2010	1 July	According to the United Nations, Japanese population has now peaked.
2010	11 July	Prime Minister Naoto Kan won the House of Councillors election.
2011	January and March	The Tokyo Skytree 634.0 metres (2,080 ft) became the third tallest tower in the world, which opened in 2012.
2011	11 March	Japan gets hit with the (earthquake, tsunami, and nuclear disaster, etc.), which claimed the lives of 20,000 people.
2011	March	Japan Self-Defense Force Base was established in Djibouti.
2012	16 December	Shinzo Abe wins the general election for the first time.
2012	26 December	Shinzo Abe is inaugurated as the 98th Prime Minister of Japan.
2013	2 January	Abenomics and Japanese policies are enacted to handle the consequences of the Lost Decade. Japanese aging population has begun to decrease since July 2010.
2013	June to October	2013 Japanese heatwave, according to Ministry of Health, Labor, and Welfare official confirmed report, 1,077 people lost their lives to heatwave, caused by heat stroke, second worst heatwave disaster in Japan.
2013	21 July	Prime Minister Shinzo Abe won the House of Councillors election at the first time.
2013	7 September	During the 125th IOC Session in Buenos Aires, Japan is awarded the rights to host 2020 Tokyo Summer Olympic Games for the first time since the Reiwa period. Istanbul and Madrid were other contenders.
2013	6 December	The State Secrecy Law passes the National Diet.
2014	5 March	During the 2012–2013 PC remote control incident in Japan, a 31-year-old male suspect was released on bail for the first time in almost a year from the Tokyo Detention Center. However, following a prosecutorial claim, the Tokyo District Court revoked his bail on 19 May, and the suspect was imprisoned in the Tokyo Detention Center on 20 May.
2014	8 March	Abeno Harukas opens in Abeno-ku, Osaka, becoming the tallest building in Japan.
2014	31 March	The International Court of Justice ruled that Japan's whaling program violated the International Convention for the Regulation of Whaling. The court found that the operations were not for research purposes and ordered Japan to halt the program.
2014	1 April	Consumption tax increases to eight percent from five percent since 1997.
2014	20 August	2014 Hiroshima landslides: According to several news reports, there were 74 fatalities in Asakita-ku, Hiroshima.
2014	27 August	According to the Japanese Ministry of Health, Labor, and Welfare, the first dengue fever outbreak in the country since 1945 occurred. 153 people showed the same symptoms by October, mainly in the Greater Tokyo Area in the Kantō region.
2014	27 September	The Mount Ontake eruption began and killed 63 people. It was the worst volcanic disaster since 1991.
2014	14 December	Prime Minister Shinzo Abe won the general election for the second time.
2015	8 January	The National Highway Traffic Safety Administration fines Honda a record 70 million dollars for grossly under-reporting fatal accidents and injuries to the government.
2015	14 January	Prime Minister Shinzo Abe approves a record defence budget with plans to buy surveillance aircraft and Lockheed Martin F-35 Lightning II fighter jets to improve the security of uninhabited islands in the East China Sea claimed by both Japan and China.
2015	15 January	Japan–Australia Economic Partnership Agreement enters into force.
2015	1 February	JAXA and Mitsubishi Heavy Industries conduct their first launch of an Information Gathering Satellite with the aid of an H-IIA rocket F-27 from Tanegashima Space Center.
2015	2 February	The Supreme Court finalizes the death sentence of Tomohiro Kato, a man who was convicted of killing 7 people and wounding 10 people in an indiscriminate rampage in Akihabara, Tokyo, on 8 June 2008.
2015	20 February	Tokyo Metropolitan Police Department Public Security Bureau (TMPDPSB) arrests Tsutomu Shirosaki, a Japanese Red Army member, for attempted arson associated with a 1986 mortar attack in Indonesia as he arrives at Narita Airport, having been deported from the United States following his January 16 release from prison.
2015	26 February	Prince William made his first official visit to Japan, which included visiting Miyagi and Fukushima Prefectures, to support the areas that had been affected by the 2011 triple disaster.
2015	3 March	Paul Allen, a co-founder of Microsoft and philanthropist, has announces that he discovered the Japanese battleship Musashi, more than 70 years after it was sunk by the United States Navy, in the Sibuyan Sea, of the Philippines.
2015	10 March	The Supreme Court rejects prosecutors' claims that a 41-year-old man from Osaka Prefecture in Kansai region, who evaded 570 million yen in taxes by failing to declare income from betting on horse races, confirming that money lost betting on horses can, for tax purposes, be considered expenses deductible from winnings. FamilyMart and UNY Group Holdings, the holding company of Circle K Sunkus, reach an agreement to merge in September 2016, forming the second biggest convenience store operator by sales in Japan under a single brand name.
2015	14 March	Hokuriku Shinkansen starts its service between Nagano and Kanazawa in Ishikawa Prefecture, cutting travel time between Tokyo and Kanazawa by about 80 minutes to as little as 2 hours and 28 minutes.
2015	28 March	The main keep of Himeji Castle, a UNESCO-designated World Heritage Site, reopened to the public after a 5-year restoration project. The keep itself is recognized as one of the National Treasures of Japan.
2015	10 April	The Nikkei 225 index reaches 20,006.00 in the first few minutes of trade, passing the 20,000 level for the first time since April 2000.
2015	14 April	The Government of South Korea lifts the departure ban on a former chief of the Sankei Shimbun's Seoul bureau, who had been barred from leaving the country for eight months following his indictment in October 2014 for defamation of South Korean President Park Geun-hye. The charges were due to an article, posted on a Sankei website, that referred to a rumor in a South Korean publication that Park was seeing a man on the day of the sinking of MV Sewol in April 2014.
2015	17 April	Prime Minister Shinzo Abe meets Takeshi Onaga, Governor of Okinawa Prefecture for the first time to push ahead with the government plan to relocate a U.S. military base in Futenma to the proposed location around Camp Schwab in Nago, Okinawa, but failed to reach agreement over the relocation.
2015	11 July	President of Nintendo Satoru Iwata died of bile duct cancer at the age of 55.
2015	11 August	Sendai Nuclear Power Plant No. 1 reactor is the first reactor to be restarted in accordance with the new regulatory requirements established by the Nuclear Regulation Authority following the Fukushima nuclear accident.
2016	13 January	The Supreme Court rejects the appeal of former Aum Shinrikyo founder and leader Shoko Asahara, and his sentence of 9 years in prison is confirmed.
2016	14 to 16 April	A series of major earthquakes strikes Kumamoto Prefecture, killing 277 people and injuring 2,809.
2016	26 to 27 May	The 42nd G7 summit is held on Kashiko Island.
2016	10 July	Prime Minister Shinzo Abe won the House of Councillors election for the second time.
2016	31 July	Yuriko Koike won the Tokyo gubernatorial election and was elected the 9th Governor of Tokyo Metropolis.
2017	1 June	According to National Police Agency confirmed report, eight person arrested for violating customs law, who brought the equivalent of about 200 kg of gold, about 8.2 million US dollars to the fishing port without permission in Karatsu, Saga Prefecture.
2017	5 October	Japanese-British writer Kazuo Ishiguro won the 2017 Nobel Prize in Literature.
2017	22 October	Prime Minister Shinzo Abe won the general election for the third time.
2017	30 November	Emperor Akihito announces that he intends to retire and the end of Heisei period on April 30, 2019.
2018	12 March	Japanese government has official confirmed that Japanese Ministry of Finance rewrote 14 decision documents in accordance with the response about a cooperative school in Osaka Prefecture to the National Assembly in 2017.
2018	13 March	According to the Japan Forestry and Forest Products Research Institute, an official report confirmed the Kumano cherry tree (Kumanozakura) as a new species Cherry tree (Sakura). The tree was discovered widely throughout the Kii Peninsula. The last new type of Sakura tree found in Japan was in 1915.
2018	7 April	Japan activated the Amphibious Rapid Deployment Brigade, its first marine unit since World War II. They're trained to counter invaders from occupying Japanese islands.
2018	28 June to 9 July	Heavy floods was started in western areas of Japan, most in Hiroshima Prefecture, which has been hit by torrential rain. As of 20 July, 225 people were killed, another 13 were declared missing, and 1.5 million people were displaced.
2018	9 July to 26 August	East Asia heat wave kills least 116 people, due to heat-related causes, and at least 22,000 more suffer from heat strokes.
2018	9 August	According to Ministry of Land, Infrastructure, Transport and Tourism official confirmed report, nine people died when a Bell 412EP helicopter crashed into the forest site in Nakanojō, Gunma Prefecture.
2018	4 September	A 6.6 magnitude earthquake hit Hokkaido created a region-wide power outage, because of damage to a thermal power station in the hard-hit town, Atsuma. According to a Japan Fire and Disaster Management Agency official report, 41 people were killed and 692 people were wounded.
2018	11 October	Toyosu Market has opened as the largest wholesale fish market in the world. It replaced the old Tsukiji fish market.
2018	26 December	Since the founder of International Whaling Commission in 1946, Japan announced that IWC had failed its duty to promote sustainable hunting, which is one of its stated goals, Japan is withdrawing its membership and will resume commercial hunting in its territorial waters and exclusive economic zone from July 2019, but will cease whaling activities in the Antarctic Ocean.
2018	27 December	Japan executes two more prisoners, bringing 2018 executions to 15 taking annual total to highest since 2008.

== Reiwa period (2019 onwards) ==
Year	Date	Event
2019	30 April	Emperor Akihito is abdicated, becoming the first Japanese emperor to do so since 1817. Prince Naruhito succeeds his father as the Emperor of Japan, which marks the start of Reiwa period.
2019	25 May 2019 to 1 January 2020	The 2019 Emperor's Cup begins.
2019	1 July	Japan announces tightening of high-tech exports to South Korea, effective on 4 July, thus begin the trade dispute between the two countries from July 2019 to March 2023.
2019	2 July	The tourist boom in Japan reach unprecedented scale, with a number of yearly visitors counting in millions - 19.73 in 2015, 23.97 in 2016, 28.6 in 2017, and 31.19 million foreign visitors in 2018.
2019	18 July	Kyoto Animation arson attack: 36 people were killed in one of the deadliest massacres in post-World War II history of Japan.
2019	21 July	Prime Minister Shinzo Abe wins the House of Councillors election for the third time.
2019	2 August	Japan announces the removal of South Korea from its list of most trusted trading partners, effective on 28 August 2019.
2019	20 September to 2 November	2019 Rugby World Cup begins in Japan.
2019	29 November	The oldest living former Prime Minister Yasuhiro Nakasone died of natural causes at aged 101.
2020	15 January	According to the Ministry of Health, Labour and Welfare official report, Japan has confirmed the first case of novel coronavirus. It was marked the second exported case of COVID-19 pandemic (After Thailand) and the first reported in Japan. The patient was discharged from the hospital and Japanese government scaled up a whole-of-government coordination mechanism.
2020	30 March	2020 Tokyo Summer Olympics has been postponed to 2021 due to the COVID-19 pandemic.
2020	7 April to 29 May	Prime Minister Shinzo Abe declared the first state of emergency over COVID-19 spreading.
2020	29 August	Prime Minister Shinzo Abe resigned due to his health reasons, such as ulcerative colitis, and he was replaced by his successor Yoshihide Suga at one month later.
2021	7 January to 1 October	Prime Minister Yoshihide Suga declares the second, third, and fourth state of emergencies amid rising COVID-19 infections and deaths.
2021	February	COVID-19 vaccination program begins in Japan.
2021	23 July to 8 August	2020 Summer Olympic Games are held in Japan.
2021	30 September	According to the Institute for Health Metrics and Evaluation (IHME) estimated report, from January 2020 to the end of September 2021, Japan registered 112,000 excess deaths as a direct effect of COVID-19 pandemic, but not 18,000 officially reported deaths.
2021	4 October	Prime Minister Yoshihide Suga resigns due to poor approval ratings He was replaced by Fumio Kishida, who was elected 100th Prime Minister of Japan.
2021	31 October	Prime Minister Fumio Kishida wins the 2021 general election about 34.6% of the vote.
2021	30 November 2021 to 7 May 2023	Japan has confirms the first domestic case of COVID-19 Omicron variant, found from South Africa. As of 7 May 2023, Japan has reported 56,500 Omicron-related deaths, a lower mortality toll, compared to wealthy countries.
2022	9 January	Former Prime Minister Toshiki Kaifu dies of pneumonia at the age of 91.
2022	1 February and 8 March	Former Governor of Tokyo Shintaro Ishihara and his wife, essayist Noriko Ishihara both died at their home in Ota, Tokyo, at the both age of 89.
2022	4 to 20 February	Japanese athletes compete in the 2022 Winter Olympics in Beijing.
2022	23 April	According to a Japan Coast Guard official confirmed report, a sightseeing ferry, Kazu I, sank nearby Shiretoko Peninsula, Hokkaido. In total, 26 people died.
2022	25 June	According to Japan Meteorological Agency official confirmed report, a Celsius 40.2 degrees (Fahrenheit 104.36 degrees) high temperature record hit in Isesaki, Gunma Prefecture, as highest temperature record on June in Japan, since first observation record of JMA, since 1872, as same place another Celsius 40.0 (Fahrenheit 104.0 degrees) recorded observed on June 29.
2022	8 July	At 11:30 a.m., former Prime Minister Shinzo Abe was assassinated by 41-year-old-gunman Tetsuya Yamagami while he was giving a speech at the House of Councillors election campaign in Nara. At 5:03 p.m., he died at Nara hospital after being shot (about 5 hours and 33 minutes later).
2022	11 July	Following Shinzo Abe's assassination, Japanese government discussed that Unification Church leader Tomihiro Tanaka has confirmed Tetsuya Yamagami's mother was a member of the religious group (Also known as the Unification Church (Shukyo nisei)). Because Shinzo Abe had alleged ties to the Unification Church, which go back generations including his father, Shintaro Abe, his mother Yoko Abe, and his maternal grandparents, Nobusuke and Yoshiko Kishi. At the end of World War II, his maternal grandfather was jailed as a suspected war criminal.
2022	25 July	According to Japanese Ministry of Health, Labor and Welfare official reports, Japan has confirmed the first case of monkeypox outbreak, but Japanese public health experts are said it is unlikely to cause a new surge.
2022	10 August	Prime Minister Fumio Kishida announced the first reshuffling of his second cabinet.
2022	17 to 20 September	Typhoon Nanmadol, a heavy massive precipitation and landslide hit in southern Kyushu Island and other western parts of Japan. At least four people were killed and 147 people were wounded, according to Japan Fire and Disaster Management Agency official confirmed report.
2022	28 October to 31 December	According to both Ministry of Agriculture, Forestry and Fisheries and Ministry of Health, Labor, and Welfare official reports, 50 cases of bird flu have been reported in Japan in chickens and ducks raised on poultry farms in nationwide, total 7.63 millions sluggered by Japan Ground Self-Defense Force.
2022	22 November	Japan begins investigation into the Unification Church, just four months following the assassination of former Prime Minister Shinzo Abe, who allegedly by Tetsuya Yamagami with a longstanding grudge against the religious group.
2022	29 December	Following China's recent decision to end its Zero-COVID strategy, Japanese Health, Labor and Welfare Minister Katsunobu Kato says the possibility of imposing travel restrictions on visitors from the Greater China is 'under the review'. The following day, Japanese Health, Labor and Welfare Ministry has confirmed that passengers arriving in Japan from Greater China will have to provide a negative test before they board a flight.
2023	1 January to 28 March	According to Ministry of Agriculture, Forestry and Fisheries and Ministry of Health, Labor, and Welfare official confirmed reports, at least 82 livestock farm place were bird flu, resulting H5N1 type from death bodies positive test on nationwide, and 9.9 million chickens were culled by Japan Ground Self-Defense Force.
2023	13 January	According to the Yomiuri Shimbun newspaper reports, Japanese prosecutors indicts 42-year-old gunman Tetsuya Yamagami for the suspect of the assassination of former Prime Minister Shinzo Abe on murder charges and as well as the gun violating laws after the concluding 6 months of psychiatric evaluation.
2023	15 April	Prime Minister Fumio Kishida assassination attempt in Wakayama following the Saikazaki bombing.
2023	2 June	According to Japan Meteorological Agency official confirmed report, a heavy massive torrential rain, affective Typhoon Mawar hit in Japan, many places occur on flash flood, levee collapse, landslide hit in Tokyo metropolitan area, Kii Peninsula, and Hamamatsu, which killed 7 people and 45 people are wounded.
2023	14 July	According to Japan Aerospace Exploration Agency (JAXA) official confiremed report, an explosion occurred during the test of solid fuel Epsilon rocket at JAXA's Noshiro Testing Center in Noshiro, Akita Prefecture, no one injures on this incident.
2023	24 August	According to Japanese government official announcement, a despite opposition groups from environmental activist and government official from neighbor countries, from discharge of radioactive water of the Fukushima First Nuclear Power Plant to start into the Pacific Ocean has started. Relative Chinese government and South Korean government both announces that prohibition to all fish import from Japan on same day.
2023	4 September	The Supreme Court of Japan formally orders Okinawa to allow the United States Armed Forces to expand its runways and military infrastructure on the island despite protests from the locals who oppose the American military's presence.
2023	13 September	Prime MinisterFumio Kishida announced the second reshuffling of his second cabinet.
2023	13 October	Japanese government seeking the dissolution of the Unification Church branch in Japan following the assassination of former Prime Minister Shinzo Abe at one year ago.
2024	1 January	A 7.5 magnitude earthquake strikes Ishikawa Prefecture, killing at least 241 people.
2024	1 March	Nikkei Stock Exchange reaches 40,000 points for the first time.
2024	16 March	Hokuriku Shinkansen railway extension from Kanazawa to Tsuruga, Fukui is completed.
2024	3 April	A magnitude 7.4 earthquake strikes off the coast of Taiwan, prompting tsunami warnings for Okinawa Prefecture in Japan. A large section of an uninhabited Guishan Island collapses into the Pacific Ocean. Nine people are killed including four by rockfalls in Taiwan, with more than 930 other people have injured. A 30-cm tsunami is observed at Yonaguni Island and Miyako Island while a 20 cm tsunami reaches Ishigaki Island.
2024	27 July	The Sado mine is designated as a World Heritage Site by UNESCO.
2024	14 August	Prime Minister Kishida withdraws from his candidacy for re-election in Liberal Democratic Party leadership election scheduled in September, which would also end his premiership.
2024	1 October	Shigeru Ishiba becomes Prime Minister.
2024	27 October	2024 Japanese general election: The LDP loses its parliamentary majority for the first time since 2009.
2025	3 March	Prime Minister Shigeru Ishiba gives ¥100,000 gift vouchers to 15 LDP lawmakers, sparking criticism. He denies breaking political laws.
2025	13 April to 13 October	The Expo 2025 is held in Osaka.
2025	30 July	Tokyo District Court orders Tokyo Electric Power Company (TEPCO) to pay 100 million yen ($676,000) in damages to Katsutaka Idogawa, the former mayor of Futaba in Fukushima Prefecture, over the impact of Fukushima nuclear accident, damaged by the Great East Japan earthquake in March 2011. Japan Meteorological Agency records the highest temperature recorded in Japan, at 41.2 °C (106.2 °F) in Tamba, Hyōgo Prefecture.
2025	7 September	Prime Minister Shigeru Ishiba resigns from office to take responsibility for the defeat of the ruling coalition in the 2025 Japanese House of Councillors election on July following the government call from his party.
2025	21 October	Sanae Takaichi becomes Prime Minister.
2026	28 July	A magnitude 7.1 earthquake hits Kumamoto Prefecture, killing 39 people.

== See also ==
Cities in Japan

- Timeline of Fukuoka
- Timeline of Hiroshima
- Timeline of Kobe
- Timeline of Kyoto
- Timeline of Nagasaki
- Timeline of Nagoya
- Timeline of Osaka
- Timeline of Tokyo; and History of Tokyo, with "significant events" sections
- Timeline of Yokohama
