= Timeline of Yokohama =

The following is a timeline of the history of the city of Yokohama, Japan.

== Prior to 20th century ==
- 1859
  - July: Port of Yokohama opens.
  - Noge Bridge constructed.
- 1860 - Orrin Freeman's photography studio begins operating.
- 1861 - Japan Herald English-language newspaper in publication.
- 1862 - September 14: Namamugi Incident.
- 1866 - 26 November: Fire.
- 1867 - Japan Gazette English-language newspaper begins publication.
- 1868
  - Yoshida Bashi (bridge) built.
  - Yokohama Military Hospital and Yokohama Cricket Club founded.
  - First barber's pole in Japan installed.
- 1869
  - Tokyo-Yokohama telegraph begins operating.
  - Maruzen publisher in business.
- 1871 - Yokohama Mainichi Shinbun (newspaper) begins publication.
- 1872
  - May: Sinagawa-Yokohama railway begins operating; Yokohama Station built.
  - Yokohama Central Hospital established.
- 1873 - Suzuki Shin'ichi I's photography studio begins operating.
- 1874 - Kuboyama Cemetery established.
- 1875 - Far East English-language newspaper begins publication.
- 1876 - Kanagawa Normal School founded.
- 1880 - Yokohama Specie Bank and Yokohama Chamber of Commerce established.
- 1882 - Yokohama School of Commerce established.
- 1886 - Cholera outbreak.
- 1888 - January 31: Fire in Noge-cho.
- 1889 - Yokohama incorporated as a city; municipal election held.
- 1890
  - Tokyo-Yokohama telephone begins operating.
  - Kanagawa Shimbun (newspaper) begins publication.
  - Population: 127,987.
- 1894 - 20 June: Earthquake/fire.
- 1897 - 9 September: Typhoon.
- 1898 - Population: 193,762.

== 20th century ==
- 1902 - 29 September: Typhoon.
- 1906 - Golf course built.
- 1909 - Population: 394,303.
- 1917 - Yokohama Port Opening Memorial Hall built.
- 1918 - Population: 447,423.
- 1920
  - Yokohama Institute of Technology and Kanagawa Youth Normal School founded.
  - Population: 579,310.
- 1923
  - September 1: 1923 Great Kantō earthquake.
  - Yokohama College of Economics founded.
- 1924 - Yokohama International School founded.
- 1926 - Yokohama No. 2 Joint Government Office Building constructed.
- 1928
  - Yokohama City College of Commerce founded.
  - Kanagawa Prefectural Office built.
- 1930
  - Yamashita Park opens.
  - Population: 704,236.
- 1934 - Nissan Motor Co. factory begins operating.
- 1938 - Yokohama Customs building constructed.
- 1940 - Population: 968,091.
- 1942
  - Kanagawa Shimbun (newspaper) in publication.
  - Bombed in the Doolittle Raid.
- 1944 - Yokohama Municipal Medical College founded.
- 1945
  - Bombing of Yokohama during World War II.
  - Population: 624,994.
- 1949 - Yokohama City University and Yokohama National University active.
- 1950 - Population: 951,189.
- 1951
  - April 24: Sakuragichō train fire.
  - Nogeyama Zoological Gardens founded.
- 1952 - Nagahama Hall (concert hall) built.
- 1956 - Yokohama designated a government ordinance city.
- 1957 - Sister city relationship established with San Diego, USA.
- 1960 - Population: 1,375,710.
- 1961 - Yokohama Marine Tower erected.
- 1963
  - November 9: Tsurumi rail accident.
  - Ichio Asukata becomes mayor.
- 1972
  - Yokohama Municipal Subway begins operating.
  - Nissan Motors F.C., one of the predecessors of J1 League soccer club Yokohama F. Marinos, formed.
- 1975 - Population: 2,620,000.
- 1978
  - Yokohama Stadium opens.
  - Michikazu Saigō becomes mayor.
- 1979 - Yokohama Municipal Children's Botanical Garden established.
- 1980 - Yokohama Film Festival begins.
- 1981
  - Yokohama Archives of History established.
  - Yokohama Jazz Festival begins.
- 1986 - Shinasobaya ramen eatery in business.
- 1989 - Yokohama Bay Bridge and Cosmo Clock 21 (ferris wheel) open.
- 1990
  - Hidenobu Takahide becomes mayor.
  - Population: 3,220,331.
- 1992 - Yokohama Bay Stars baseball team active.
- 1993 - Yokohama Flügels football team active.
- 1994
  - Tsurumi Tsubasa Bridge built.
  - Shin-Yokohama Raumen Museum opens.
- 1998 - International Stadium Yokohama opens.
- 1999 - Yokohama F. Marinos football team formed.

== 21st century ==
- 2002
  - Hiroshi Nakada becomes mayor.
  - 2002 FIFA World Cup final helds in International Stadium Yokohama.
- 2004 - Minatomirai Line begins operating.
- 2009 - Fumiko Hayashi elected mayor.
- 2010 - Population: 3,688,773.
- 2021
  - 2020 Summer Olympics football final helds in International Stadium Yokohama.
  - 2020 Summer Olympics baseball and softball final helds in Yokohama Stadium

== See also ==
- Yokohama history
- Timeline of Yokohama (in Japanese)
- List of mayors of Yokohama

== Bibliography ==
Published in the 19th century

- William Henry Overall, ed. (1870). "Yokohama". Dictionary of Chronology. London: William Tegg. hdl:2027/uc2.ark:/13960/t9m32q949.
- John R. Black (1883), Young Japan: Yokohama and Yedo, New York: Baker, Pratt & Co., OL 7199472M (describes 1858-1879 from expat perspective)
- Boston Public Library (1895). "Japan: Yokohama". List of Works on Corea, Japan, and China. USA.

Published in the 20th century

- "Yokohama". Guide Book for Tourists in Japan. Yokohama: Obun Printing Co. 1903.
- Matsutaro Nakada (ed.). City of Yokohama, Past and Present. Yokohama Publishing.
- "Yokohama" . Encyclopædia Britannica. Vol. 28 (11th ed.). 1910. p. 921.
- "Yokohama (Musashi)", Handbook for Travellers in Japan (9th ed.), London: J. Murray, 1913, hdl:2027/nnc1.50290956
- T. Philip Terry (1914), "Yokohama and its Environs", Terry's Japanese Empire, Boston: Houghton Mifflin, LCCN 14005129
- Robert P. Porter (1915), "Ports and Other Cities: (Yokohama)", Japan, the New World-Power (2nd ed.), London: Oxford University Press
- "Short History of the City of Yokohama", Summary of the Yokohama City Annual Statistics, Yokohama City Office, 1920, hdl:2027/umn.31951t00084131s (includes timeline)
- Yūzō Katō; Yokohama Shiritsu Daigaku (1990). Yokohama, past and present: 100th anniversary of Yokohama's incorporation 130th anniversary of the Port of Yokohama. Yokohama City University.

Published in the 21st century

- Hugh Cortazzi, ed. (2012). "Yokohama". Victorians in Japan: In and Around the Treaty Ports. Bloomsbury. pp. 54–92. ISBN 978-1-78093-977-3. (first published in 1987)
- Cornelis Theodoor van Assendelft de Coningh (2012). Martha Chaiklin (ed.). A Pioneer in Yokohama: a Dutchman's Adventures in the New Treaty Port. Hackett Publishing. ISBN 978-1-60384-906-7.
