= Yokohama Customs Museum =

Coordinates: 35.449463°N 139.642247°E

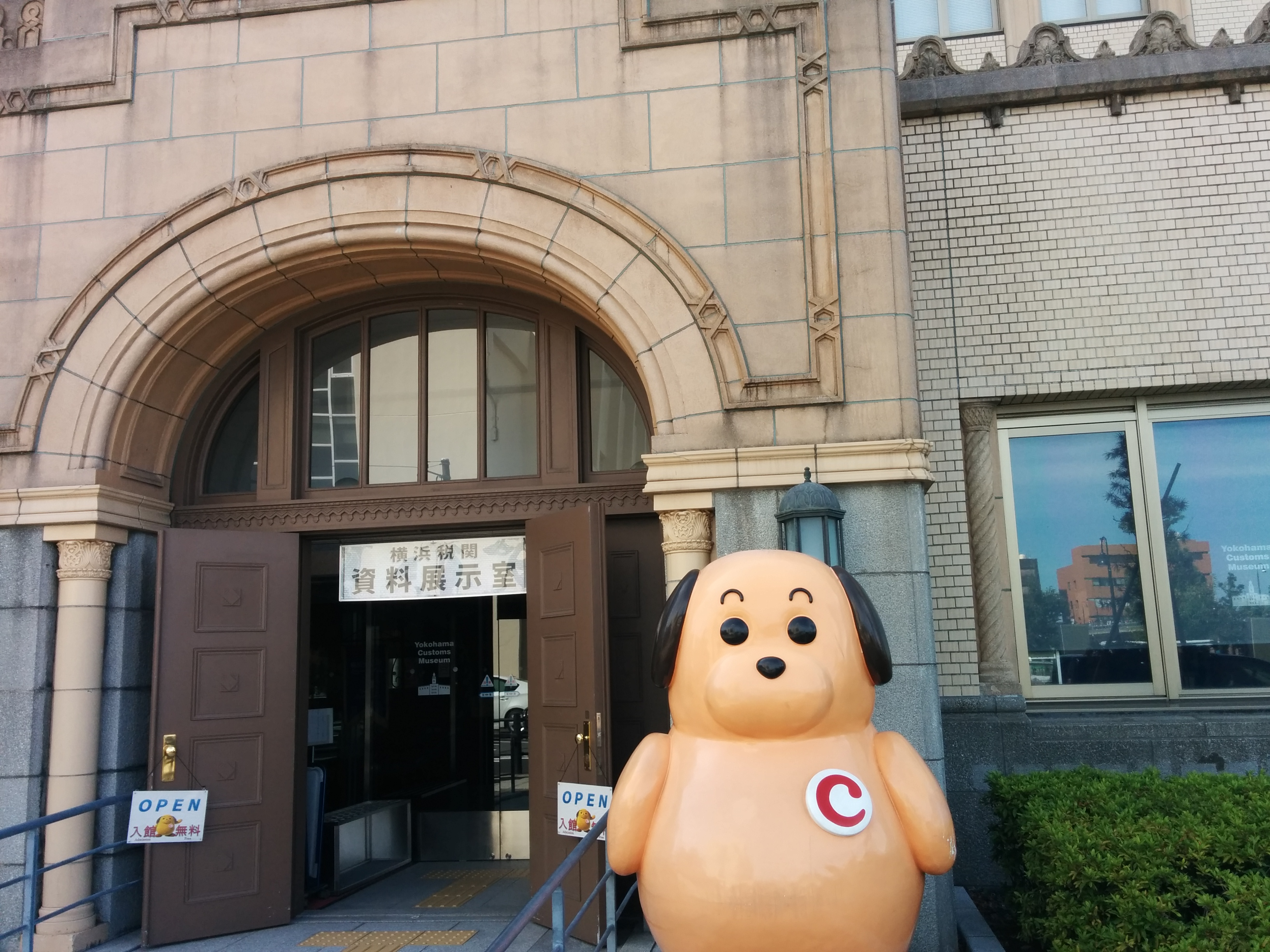
Entrance to the museum

Yokohama Customs Museum is a museum in Yokohama, Kanagawa, Japan. It is located in the ground floor of the historical Yokohama Customs Building, one of the Yokohama Three Towers.
