= 1848 in Japan =

- Decades: 1820s; 1830s; 1840s; 1850s; 1860s
- See also: Other events of 1848; History of Japan • Timeline • Years

Events in the year 1848 in Japan.

== Incumbents ==
- Monarch: Kōmei
- Shogun: Tokugawa Ieyoshi

== Births ==
- January 4 – Katsura Tarō (d. 1913), general and politician, 6th Prime Minister of Japan.
