= Timeline of Nagoya =

The following is a timeline of the history of the city of Nagoya, Japan.

== Prior to 20th century ==
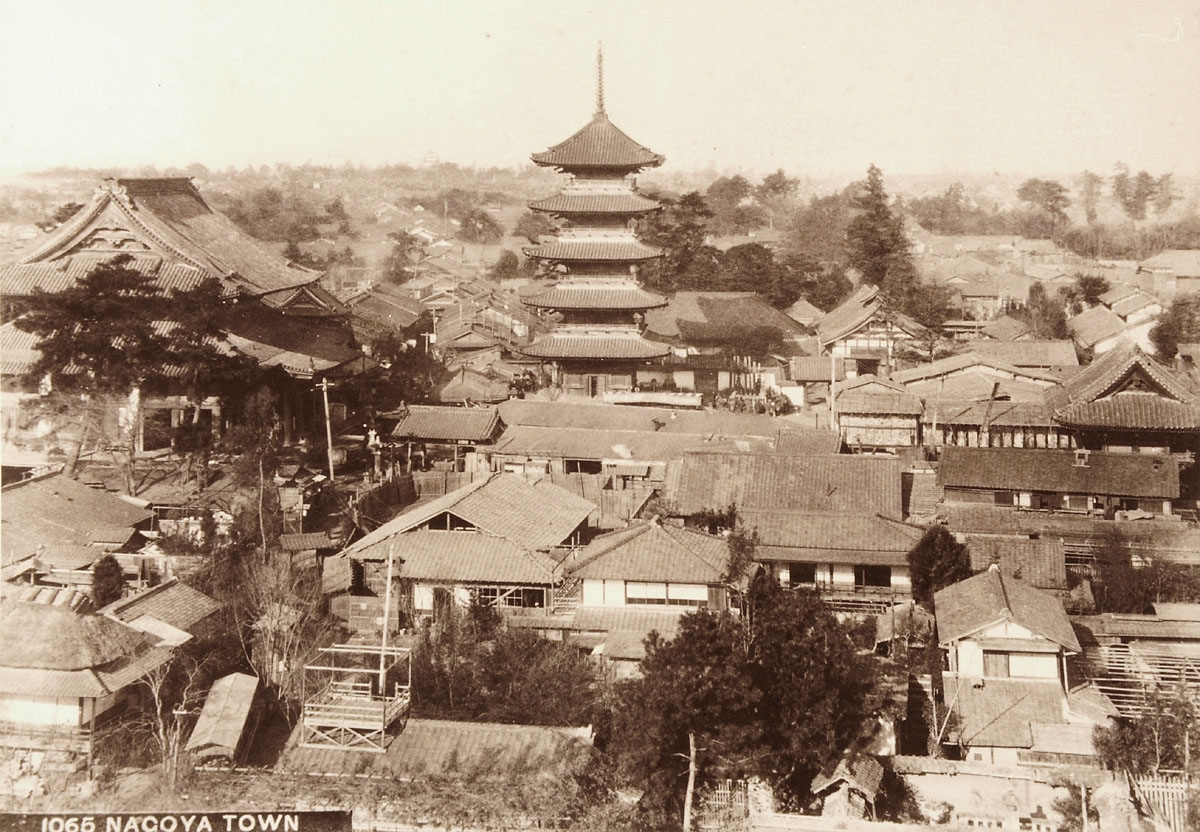
Photo of Nagoya in the 1880s

- 1612 – Nagoya Castle and its Honmaru Palace built.
- 1684 – Poet Bashō visits Nagoya.
- 1714
  - Fugetsudo Magosuke publisher in business.
  - Tōgan-ji a Buddhist temple was moved to Nagoya.
- 1776 – Eirakuya Toshiro publisher in business.
- 1790s – Booksellers' guild established.
- 1814 – Hokusai Manga published by Eirakuya Toshiro.
- 1838 - Birthplace of cloisonné enamelling in Japan.
- 1868 – Aomatsuba Incident occurs.
- 1871 – Nagoya Shimbun (newspaper) begins publication.
- 1872 – Aichi Prefecture formed.
- 1873 - A gold-plated dolphin from Nagoya Castle was displayed at the Vienna World's Fair.
- 1881 – Nagoya Chamber of Commerce and Industry founded.
- 1886 – Tokaido Line begins operating; Nagoya Station opens.
- 1887 – Population: 149,756.
- 1889 – Municipal government established.
- 1890 – Population: 170,433.
- 1891 – October 28: The 8.0 M_{s} Mino–Owari earthquake affects the Gifu region. This oblique-slip event killed over 7,200, injured more than 17,000, and created fault scarps that still remain visible.

== 20th century ==
- 1903 – Population: 284,829.
- 1910 – Matsuzakaya (shop) in business.
- 1912 – Aiyu Photography Club formed; among its founding members was photographic materials merchant Gorō Yamamoto.
- 1915
  - Kintetsu Nagoya Line begins operating.
  - Nagoya Mainichi (newspaper) in publication.
- 1916 – Catholic Nanzan University founded.
- 1918 – Rice riot occurs.
- 1920 – Population: 619,529.
- 1922
  - Transportation Bureau City of Nagoya established.
  - Nagoya Court of Appeals building constructed.
- 1929 – November: Suiheisha conference held in Nagoya.
- 1930 – Population: 926,141.
- 1935 – Tokugawa Art Museum opens.
- 1936 – Nagoya Baseball Club and Nagoya Golden Dolphins baseball team formed.
- 1937
  - Nagoya Pan-Pacific Peace Exposition (1937) held.
  - Higashiyama Zoo and Botanical Gardens founded.
- 1938 – Kintetsu Nagoya Station opens.
- 1940 – Population: 1,328,084.
- 1941
  - Tokai Bank, Ltd. established.
  - Meitetsu Nagoya Station and Mizuho Athletic Stadium open.
- 1942
  - April 18: Bombing of Nagoya in World War II begins.
  - Chunichi Shimbun (newspaper) in publication.
- 1944 – Mizuho city ward established.
- 1945 – Population: 597,941.
- 1948
  - Chunichi Dragons baseball team active.
  - Pachinko parlor and Nagoya Baseball Stadium open.
- 1949
  - Nagoya Stock Exchange established.
  - Nagoya Racecourse opens.
  - Marushin Bussan pachinko manufacturer in business.
- 1950 – Population: 1,030,635.
- 1953 – Nikkatsu Theatre opens.
- 1955 – Nagoya Festival begins.
- 1956 – Nagoya designated a government ordinance city.
- 1957 – Subway begins operating.
- 1958 – Grand Sumo tournament begins at the Nagoya Kanayama gymnasium.
- 1959
  - September: Ise-wan Typhoon occurs.
  - Nagoya Castle reconstructed.
  - Sister city relationship established with Los Angeles, USA.
- 1962 – Nagoya Television Broadcasting begins.
- 1964
  - Tōkaidō Shinkansen (hi-speed train) begins operating.
  - Aichi Prefectural Gymnasium built.
- 1975
  - "16 Wards system" established.
  - Population: 2,080,000.
- 1985 – Takeyoshi Nishio becomes mayor.
- 1987 – Nippon Rainbow Hall (arena) opens.
- 1988 – Nagoya City Art Museum opens.
- 1989
  - Nagoya City Archives established.
  - Subway Sakura-dōri Line begins operating.
  - Takaoka Station opens.
  - World Design Expo held in city.
- 1990 – Population: 2,154,793.
- 1993 – Nagoya City Minato Soccer Stadium opens.
- 1994 – Toyota Commemorative Museum of Industry and Technology established.
- 1997
  - Nagoya Dome (stadium) opens.
  - International RoboCup robotics contest held in city.
  - Takehisa Matsubara becomes mayor.
- 1999 – Nagoya Station built.
- 2000
  - JR Central Towers built.
  - Population: 2,171,378.

== 21st century ==
- 2005 – Expo 2005 held near city.
- 2009 – Takashi Kawamura becomes mayor.
- 2010
  - Nagoya Marubeni Building constructed.
  - Population: 2,263,894.
- 2011
  - March: 13 2011 Nagoya city council election held.
  - Use of Manaca fare card on public transit begins.
- 2026
  - 19 September-4 October: 20th Asian Games held.
  - 6th Asian Para Games held.

== See also ==
- Nagoya history
- Timeline of Nagoya (in Japanese)
- List of mayors of Nagoya

== Bibliography ==
- "Nagoya" . Encyclopædia Britannica. Vol. 19 (11th ed.). 1910. p. 151.
- "Nagoya", Handbook for Travellers in Japan (9th ed.), London: J. Murray, 1913, hdl:2027/nnc1.50290956
- T. Philip Terry (1914), "Nagoya", Terry's Japanese Empire, Boston: Houghton Mifflin, LCCN 14005129
- Robert P. Porter (1915), "Ports and Other Cities: (Nagoya)", Japan, the New World-Power (2nd ed.), London: Oxford University Press
- John Douglas Eyre (1982). Nagoya: the changing geography of a Japanese regional metropolis. University of North Carolina at Chapel Hill.
- Matthi Forrer (1985). Eirakuya Tōshirō, publisher at Nagoya: a contribution to the history of publishing in 19th century Japan. Amsterdam: J.C. Gieben. ISBN 9070265184.
- Kuniko Fujita and Richard Child Hill, ed. (1993). "Nagoya". Japanese Cities. USA: Temple University Press. ISBN 978-1-4399-0092-5.
