= Battle of Yawata =

14th century Japanese battle

- Part of the Nanboku-chō period
Date	January 1353
Location	Yawata, Japan
Result	Southern Court victory

Belligerents
Northern Court	Southern Court

Commanders and leaders
Unknown	Moroushi

The 1353 battle of Yawata was a battle of the Nanboku-chō period of Japanese history, and took place in Yawata, Japan. It was fought in January 1353 between the armies of the Northern and Southern Emperors of Japan, as the loyalists (Southern Court) sought to obtain a base of operations just outside the capital from which they could launch attacks on Kyoto. The army of the Southern Court was led by Moroushi, who secured the town for the loyalists; a successful siege was launched upon Kyoto the following year.
