= Takebashi incident =

Japanese military rebellion

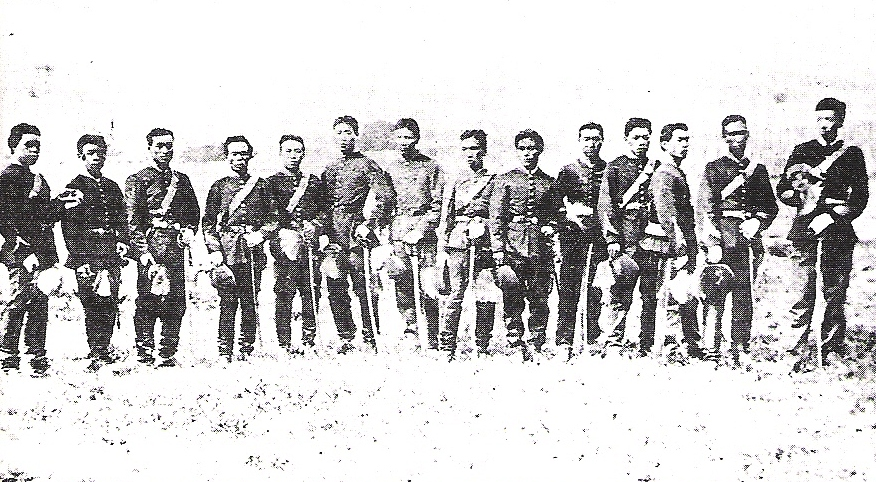
- Date: 23–24 August 1878
- Location: Tokyo Imperial Palace
- Goals: Direct appeal to Emperor Meiji
- Result: Suppressed

Lead figures
Okamoto Ryūnosuke; Miyotarō Matsuo; Takeshirō Nagashima; Mansuke Kojima; Unosuke Mizoe; Sadago Uchiyama; Masanao Yanada; Ibara Hirayama	Nishi Kanjirō; Tsū Kurokawa; Yamakawa Hiroshi; Yorimasa Kokushi; Ōshima Hisanao

Number
259 members of the Imperial Guards	844 policemen 988 soldiers

Casualties
- Deaths: 2
- Arrested: 394

The Takebashi incident was an armed rebellion that occurred on August 23, 1878, in which 260 members of the Imperial Guard of the Imperial Japanese Army mutinied and killed officers. The motivation for the incident was the desire of those individuals to be paid for their part in quelling the Satsuma Rebellion. The rioters were stationed at the Imperial Guard headquarters in Takebashi, which was just north of Akasaka Palace. The rioters were planning on burning down the palace. The government executed 55 of the rioters after putting down the mutiny.

The Meiji Restoration, which took place in the late 19th century, was a period in Japanese history when the country underwent significant transformations. It marked the end of the feudal era and the beginning of the modernization process. The restoration was driven by a strong desire for Japan to catch up with the West and achieve modernization.

== Conscription disruption incident ==
The Takebashi Incident took place in Tokyo, the capital of Japan at the time. It was a response to the low payment for hard work, forced conscription of young men into the Imperial Japanese Army. The conscription, which was part of the government's efforts to modernize the country's military forces, was met with resistance from some sections of the population.

On August 23, a group of dissatisfied individuals, led by a former samurai named Takebashi Katsumi, gathered near the Takebashi Bridge in Tokyo. They aimed to disrupt the operation of the conscription office, which was located nearby.

== Reaction and Suppression ==
The Takebashi Incident did not go unnoticed by the government. The Meiji government, which was committed to modernizing the country, took immediate action to suppress the rebellion. The Imperial Japanese Army and police were dispatched to confront the protestors and take control of the situation.

The confrontation between the government forces and the protestors turned violent. Several protestors were killed or wounded, and Takebashi himself was killed during the skirmish. The government's swift response put an end to the rebellion within a few hours.
