= Timeline of Hiroshima =

The following is a timeline of the history of the city of Hiroshima, Japan.

== Prior to 20th century ==
- 587 - The chief temple dates from this time.
- 1599 - Hiroshima Castle built.
- 1871 - City becomes seat of Hiroshima Prefecture.
- 1874 - Hakushima School founded.
- 1887
  - Hiroshima Girls' High School founded.
  - Population: 84,094.
- 1889 - Hiroshima becomes a municipality.
- 1892 - Chugoku Shimbun (newspaper) begins publication.
- 1894 - San'yō Railway begins operating.

== 20th century ==
- 1902 - Hiroshima Higher Normal School founded.
- 1903 - Population: 113,545.
- 1909 - Population: 142,763.
- 1912 - Hiroshima Electric Railway begins operating.
- 1918 - Rice riot occurs.
- 1920 - Toyo Cork Kogyo Co. (later Mazda) in business.
- 1929 - Hiroshima University of Literature and Science established.
- 1945
  - August 6: Atomic bombing of Hiroshima by US forces.
  - Population: 137,197.
- 1947
  - Hiroshima Peace Memorial Ceremony begins.
  - Shinzo Hamai becomes mayor.
- 1949 - Hiroshima University and Hiroshima Stock Exchange established.
- 1950
  - Hiroshima Toyo Carp baseball team formed.
  - Population: 285,712.
- 1951 - Chugoku Electric Power Company headquartered in city.
- 1954 - Hiroshima Peace Memorial Park established.
- 1955
  - Tosaka, Japan becomes part of city.
  - August: "First World Conference against Atomic and Hydrogen Bombs meets in Hiroshima."
- 1958 - Hiroshima reconstruction festival celebrated by the municipality to mark the city's recovery.
- 1971 - Hiroshima City Asa Zoological Park founded.
- 1974 - Population: 761,240.
- 1975 - Takeshi Araki becomes mayor.
- 1976 - Hiroshima Botanical Garden opens.
- 1978 - Hiroshima Museum of Art established.
- 1980 - Hiroshima designated a government ordinance city.
- 1985 - Hiroshima International Animation Festival begins.
- 1991 - Takashi Hiraoka becomes mayor.
- 1992 - Hiroshima Big Arch (stadium) opens.
- 1994
  - August: Astram Line (public transit) begins operating.
  - October: 1994 Asian Games held in Hiroshima.
- 1999 - Tadatoshi Akiba becomes mayor.
- 2000 - Population: 1,126,282.

== 21st century ==
- 2010 - Population: 1,173,843.
- 2011 - Kazumi Matsui elected mayor.
- 2016 - May: US president visits city.

== See also ==
- Hiroshima history
- Timeline of Hiroshima (in Japanese)
- List of mayors of Hiroshima

== Bibliography ==
- "Hiroshima" . Encyclopædia Britannica. Vol. 13 (11th ed.). 1910. p. 524.
- "Hiroshima", Handbook for Travellers in Japan (9th ed.), London: J. Murray, 1913, hdl:2027/nnc1.50290956
- Schellinger and Salkin, ed. (1996). "Hiroshima". International Dictionary of Historic Places: Asia and Oceania. UK: Routledge. p. 349+. ISBN 9781884964046.
