= Timeline of Tokyo =

The following is a timeline of the history of Tokyo, Japan.

== Prior to 19th century ==
- 1457 - Edo Castle built.
- 1617 - Yoshiwara (prostitution district) begins operating.
- 1634 - Sankin-kōtai policy established.
- 1657 - March 2: Great Fire of Meireki occurs.
- 1682 - 1682 Edo fire.
- 1698 - 1698 Edo fire.
- 1707 - December: Eruption of Mount Fuji; ash falls on Edo.
- 1721 - "First population census conducted (Edo’s population about 1.3 million)."

== 19th century ==
- 1853
  - July 8: American Perry Expedition arrives in Edo Bay.
  - Odaiba island forts built in Edo Bay.
  - Hanayashiki garden opens.
- 1855 - November 11: 1855 Edo earthquake occurs.
- 1856 - Hiroshige's One Hundred Famous Views of Edo published.
- 1868 - Edo renamed "Tokyo."
- 1869
  - Japanese imperial capital relocated to Tokyo from Kyoto.
  - Tokyo Shôkonsha (shrine) established.
  - Yokohama-Tokyo telegraph begins operating.
- 1871 - Esaki Reiji photo studio in business.
- 1872
  - Yushima Seido Exposition is held
  - October: Yokohama-Tokyo railroad begins operating.
  - Tokyo Nichi Nichi Shimbun (newspaper) begins publication.
  - "Ordinances aimed at the civilizing of the populace are enacted in Tokyo."
  - Imperial Library headquartered in Tokyo.
- 1873 - Dai-Ichi Bank established.
- 1874 - Aoyama Gakuin school and Saint Paul's school established.
- 1877
  - University of Tokyo and Fifteen Bank established.
  - National Industrial Exhibition held.
- 1880 - Mitsubishi Bank and Yasuda Bank established.
- 1881
  - Tokyo Imperial Museum built.
  - Tokyo Vocational School founded.
- 1882
  - Bank of Japan headquartered in city.
  - Ueno Zoo opens.
- 1884 - Railway Yamanote Line begins operating.
- 1886 - "First fixed advertising billboard in Tokyo" installed.
- 1887 - Tokyo School of Art founded.
- 1888
  - Tokyo Asahi Shimbun (newspaper) begins publication.
  - Tokyo Observatory established.
- 1889
  - "Tokyo City and 15 wards established."
  - Kabuki-za (theatre) opens.
- 1890
  - Telephone begins operating.
  - Population: 1,155,290.
- 1894 - Tokyo-fu Government Building constructed in Marunouchi.
- 1897 - March: Motion picture first shown.

== 20th century ==
=== 1900s-1940s ===
- 1901 - Tokyo Photography Circle (club) formed.
- 1902 - Industrial Bank of Japan headquartered in city.
- 1903
  - Electric tram begins operating.
  - Electric Hall (cinema) opens.
- 1905 - September 5: Hibiya Incendiary Incident occurs.
- 1906 - Harajuku Station opens.
- 1907 - Tokyo Industrial Exhibition held.
- 1910 - Luna Park opens.
- 1911 - Imperial Theatre opens.
- 1914
  - December: Central Station opens.
  - Taisho Exposition held.
- 1916 - Tokyo Photographers Guild established.
- 1917 - Asakusa Opera active.
- 1918
  - Rice riot occurs.
  - Neon light installed in Ginza.
- 1920
  - Meiji Shrine built.
  - Population: 3,699,428.
- 1921 - November 4: Japanese prime minister Takashi Hara assassinated.
- 1923 - September 1: 1923 Great Kantō earthquake occurs.
- 1925 - Tokyo Broadcasting Station begins operating.
- 1926
  - "Public apartment housing" built.
  - NHK Symphony Orchestra and Tokyo Metropolitan Art Museum established.
- 1927 - Tokyo Underground Railway begins operating between Asakusa and Ueno.
- 1928 - Daiba Park opens in Tokyo Bay.
- 1929 - Tokyo March song/film become popular.
- 1930 - Population: 4,986,913.
- 1931 - Haneda Airport begins operating.
- 1933 - Dai-Ichi Seimei Building constructed.
- 1934
  - Yomiuri Giants baseball team formed.
  - Hibiya Theatre opens.
- 1936
  - Konishiroku Honten in business.
  - Japanese Folk Crafts Museum founded.
- 1937 - Korakuen Stadium opens.
- 1938 - Rikugi-en (park) opens.
- 1940 - Population: 6,778,804.
- 1941
  - Port of Tokyo opens.
  - Italian Cultural Institute in Tokyo opens.
- 1942 - April: Bombing of Tokyo by US forces begins.
- 1943 - "Metropolitan administration system established."
- 1945
  - 10 March: A major air attack kills 90,000 to 100,000 people and destroys a quarter of the city's buildings
  - August: Bombing of Tokyo by US forces ends.
  - Japan Savings Bank established.
  - Population: 3,488,284.
- 1946 - Tokyo War Crimes Tribunal begins.
- 1947
  - Seiichirō Yasui elected governor.
  - 23 Special wards of Tokyo created.
- 1948 - National Diet Library headquartered in Tokyo.

=== 1950s-1990s ===
- 1950 - Population: 6,277,500.
- 1955
  - Tokyo International Trade Fair begins.
  - Population: 6,966,499.
- 1956 - City hosts the 1956 World Judo Championships.
- 1958
  - Japanese National Stadium opens.
  - May: 1958 Asian Games held in Tokyo.
  - November: City hosts the 1958 World Judo Championships.
- 1960 - Toei Subway begins operating between Asakusa Bridge and Oshiage.
- 1961
  - Suntory Art Museum opens.
  - Higashi-Ikebukuro Taishôken ramen shop in business.

1964 Summer Olympics closing ceremony

- 1964
  - Tōkaidō Shinkansen (hi-speed train) begins operating;
  - October: 1964 Summer Olympics held in Tokyo.
  - Tokyo 12 Channel TV begins broadcasting.
  - Hotel New Otani Tokyo built.
  - Tokyo Monorail begins operating.
- 1967
  - January: City hosts the 1967 FIVB Volleyball Women's World Championship.
  - Yoyogi Park created.
- 1968
  - Kasumigaseki Building (hi-rise) built.
  - Ramen Jiro eatery in business.
- 1969 - "Tokyo Metropolitan Pollution Control Ordinance enacted."
- 1971
  - Keio Plaza Hotel (hi-rise) built.
  - The Zengakuren demonstrate in Tokyo against terms for the return of Okinawa from US to Japanese control.
- 1972 - Nakagin Capsule Tower built.
- 1973 - Tokyo Metropolitan Library opens.
- 1975
  - Ward mayoral election held.
  - Population: 8,640,000 city; 11,622,651 urban agglomeration.
- 1979 - June: 5th G7 summit held in city.
- 1983 - Tokyo Disney Resort opens.
- 1988
  - Tokyo Dome (stadium) opens.
  - Yumenoshima Tropical Greenhouse Dome established.
- 1989 - Bunkamura cultural venue opens.
- 1991 - Metropolitan government relocates to new building in Shinjuku.
- 1992 - Rinkai Line begins operating.
- 1993
  - Rainbow Bridge opens.
  - DN Tower 21 built.
- 1995 - March 20: Tokyo subway sarin attack.
- 1996 - Tokyo Big Sight convention centre opens.
- 2000 - Population: 8,130,408.

== 21st century ==
- 2001
  - 10 March: Tokyo Stadium opens.
  - October: Asian Network of Major Cities 21 meets in Tokyo.
- 2002 - Tokyo International Anime Fair begins.
- 2004 - ShinGinkō Tokyo bank established.
- 2005 - Tokyo Metropolitan University established.
- 2006 - Czech Centre in Tokyo opens.
- 2007
  - Tokyo Marathon begins.
  - Midtown Tower built.
  - Shinjuku Wald 9 cinema in business.
- 2008 - C40 environmental group meets in Tokyo.
- 2010 - City hosts the 2010 World Judo Championships.
- 2011
  - 11 March: 2011 Great East Japan earthquake and tsunami occurs and seriously Fukushima nuclear disaster.
  - 17 November: Polish Institute in Tokyo founded (see also Japan–Poland relations).

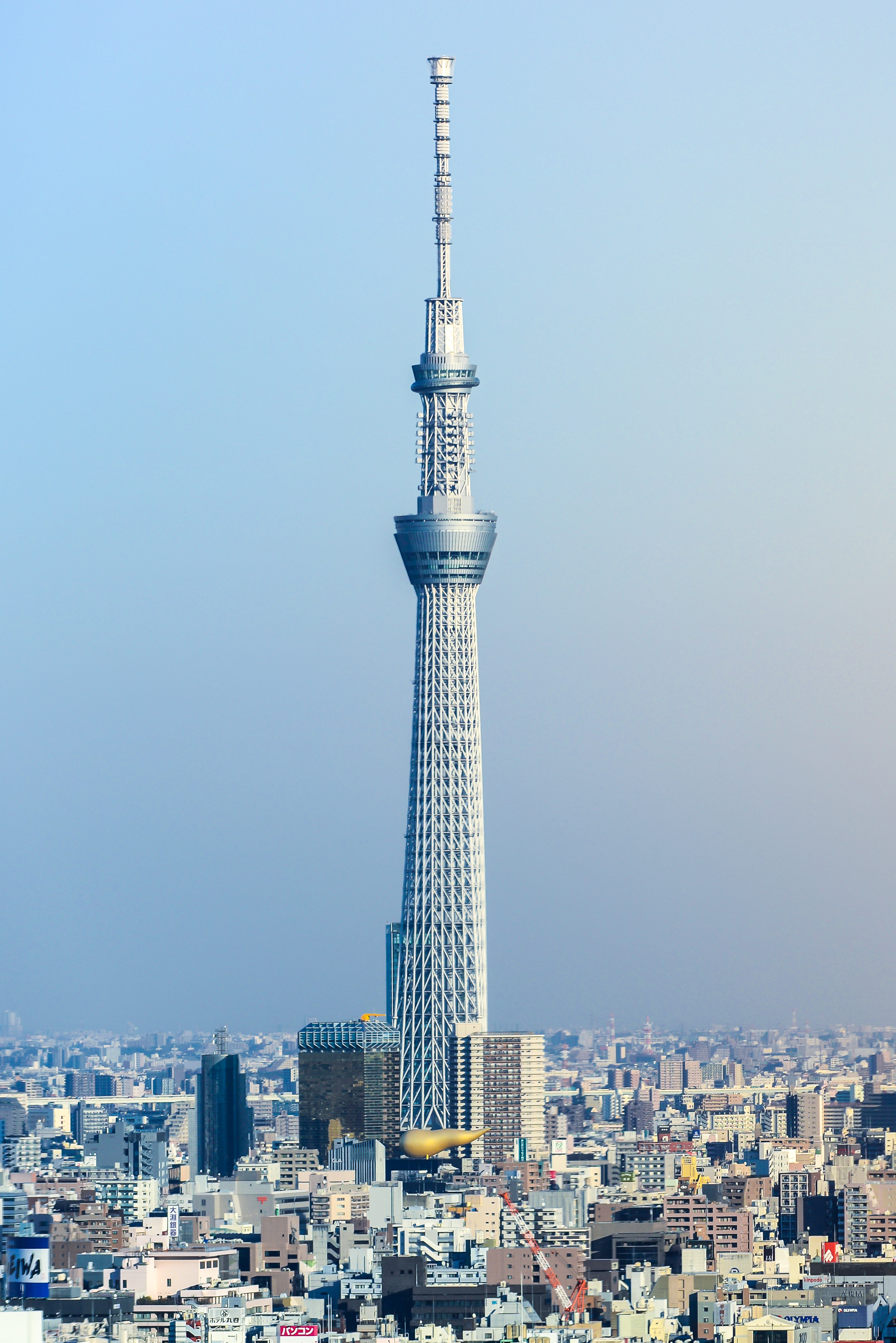
Tokyo Skytree

- 2012
  - Tokyo Gate Bridge opens.
  - Tokyo Skytree tower built.
- 2013 - September: Tokyo chosen as site of the future 2020 Summer Olympics.
- 2014
  - Toranomon Hills (hi-rise) built.
  - Yoichi Masuzoe elected governor.
- 2016 - Yuriko Koike elected governor.
- 2017
  - 25 November: Musashino Forest Sport Plaza open.
- 2019
  - August: Oi Hockey Stadium open.
  - August–September: City hosts the 2019 World Judo Championships.
  - October: Ariake Gymnastics Centre open.
  - 28 November-1 December: 2019 Trampoline Gymnastics World Championships held.
  - New Japan National Stadium open.
  - Hungarian Cultural Center in Tokyo opened (see also Hungary–Japan relations).
- 2020
  - 24 January: First confirmed case relating to the COVID-19 pandemic in Tokyo.
  - 3 February: Ariake Arena open.
  - March: Ultimately postponement of 2020 Summer Olympics to July 2021 announced due to COVID-19 concerns.
  - October: Tokyo Aquatics Centre open.
- 2021
  - 2020 Summer Olympics held.
  - 2020 Summer Paralympics held.

== See also ==
- History of Tokyo
- List of governors of Tokyo

== Bibliography ==
- William Henry Overall, ed. (1870). "Jeddo". Dictionary of Chronology. London: William Tegg. hdl:2027/uc2.ark:/13960/t9m32q949 – via HathiTrust.
- Christine Guth (1996). Art of Edo Japan: The Artist and the City 1615-1868. Yale University Press. ISBN 978-0-300-16413-8.
- Julia Meech and Jane Oliver, ed. (2008). Designed for Pleasure: The World of Edo Japan in Prints and Paintings, 1680-1860. Asia Society and Japanese Art Society of America. ISBN 978-0-295-98786-6.
- Stephen Mansfield (2009). Tokyo: a Cultural History. Oxford University Press. ISBN 978-0-19-972965-4.
- Roman Adrian Cybriwsky (2011). Historical Dictionary of Tokyo (2nd ed.). Scarecrow Press. ISBN 978-0-8108-7489-3. + Chronology
- Alisa Freedman (2011). Tokyo in Transit: Japanese Culture on the Rails and Road. Stanford University Press. ISBN 978-0-8047-7145-0.
- "Timeline". Tokyo (10th ed.). Lonely Planet. 2015. ISBN 978-1-74360-032-0.
