= Yokohama Three Towers =

Towers in Yokohama, Japan

Coordinates: 35.4526°N 139.6485°E

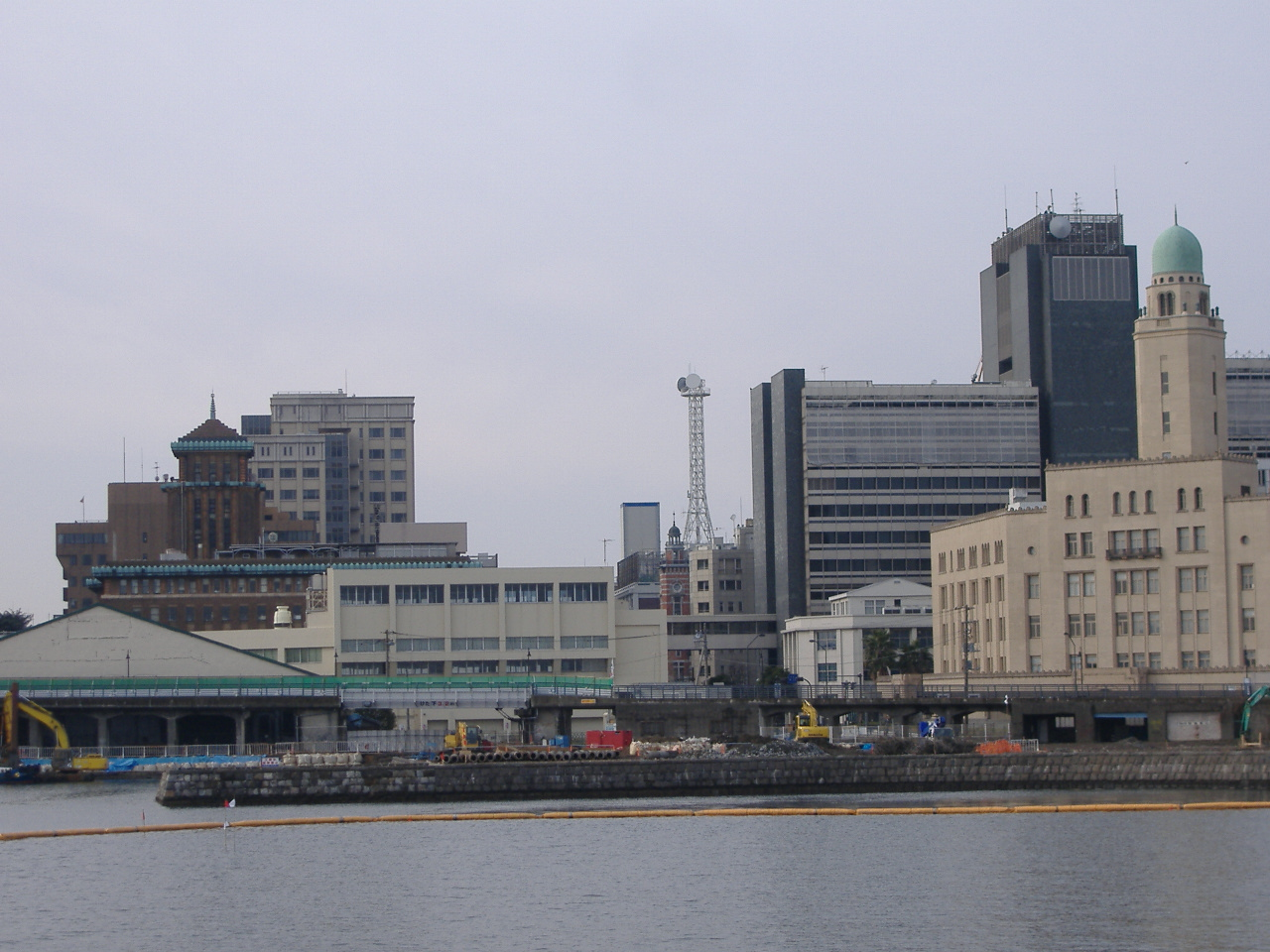
Yokohama Three Towers viewed from Akarenga

Yokohama three towers (横浜三塔, Yokohama Santō), are a group of historical towers at the Port of Yokohama. They have been given the nicknames The King, The Queen and The Jack. The best view of the three towers is considered to be from Ōsanbashi Pier.

== Three Towers ==
The three towers are:

- Yokohama Customs Building (The Queen)
- Kanagawa Prefectural Office (The King)
- Yokohama Port Opening Memorial Hall (The Jack)

== Legend ==
There is a local legend that if you go to a place where you can see all three buildings at the same time your wish will be granted. The origins of this legend vary with one version being a foreign sailor whose wish came true after looking at the towers. Another version talks about how these three towers are lucky because they withstood the 1923 Great Kantō earthquake.

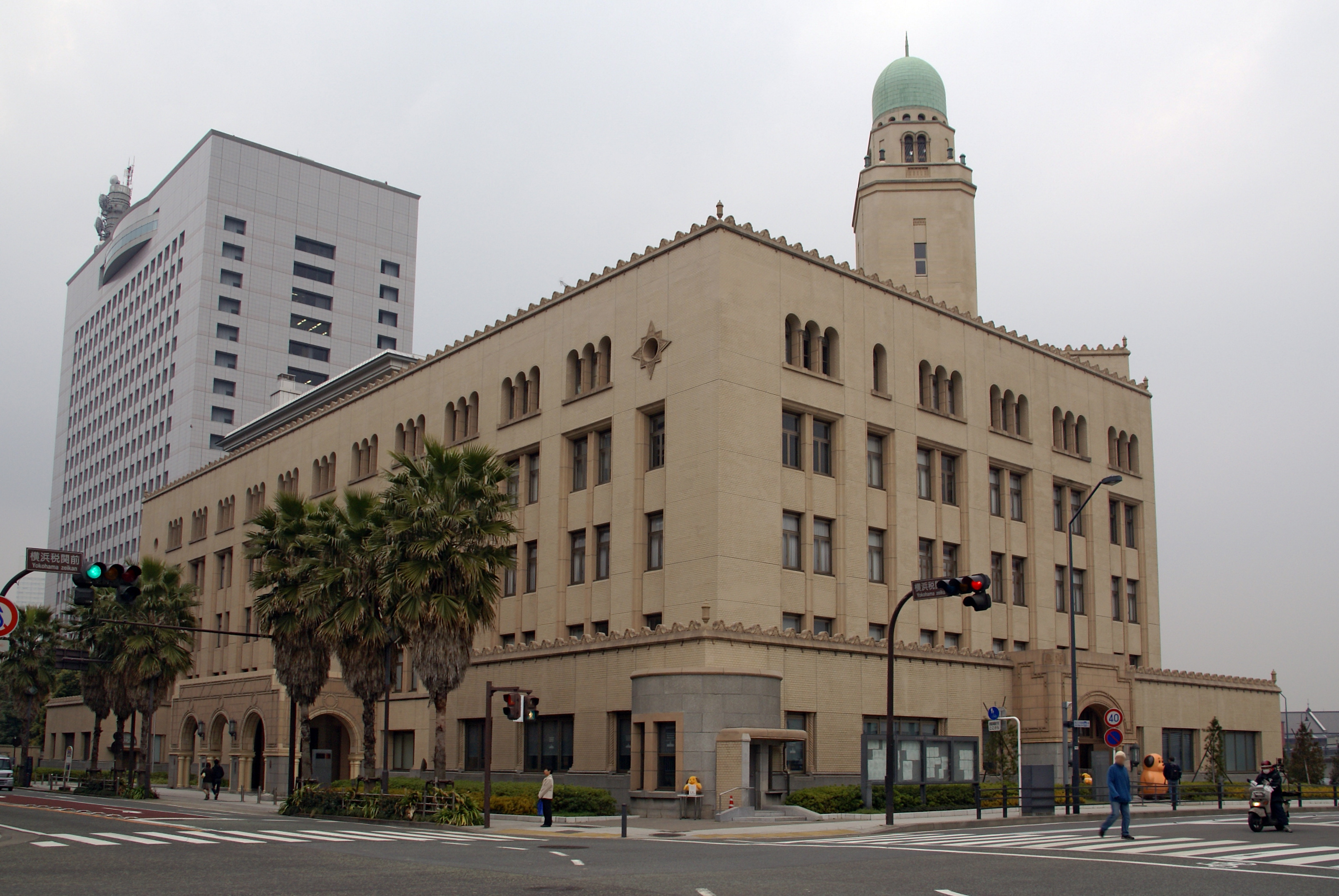
Yokohama Customs Building (The Queen)

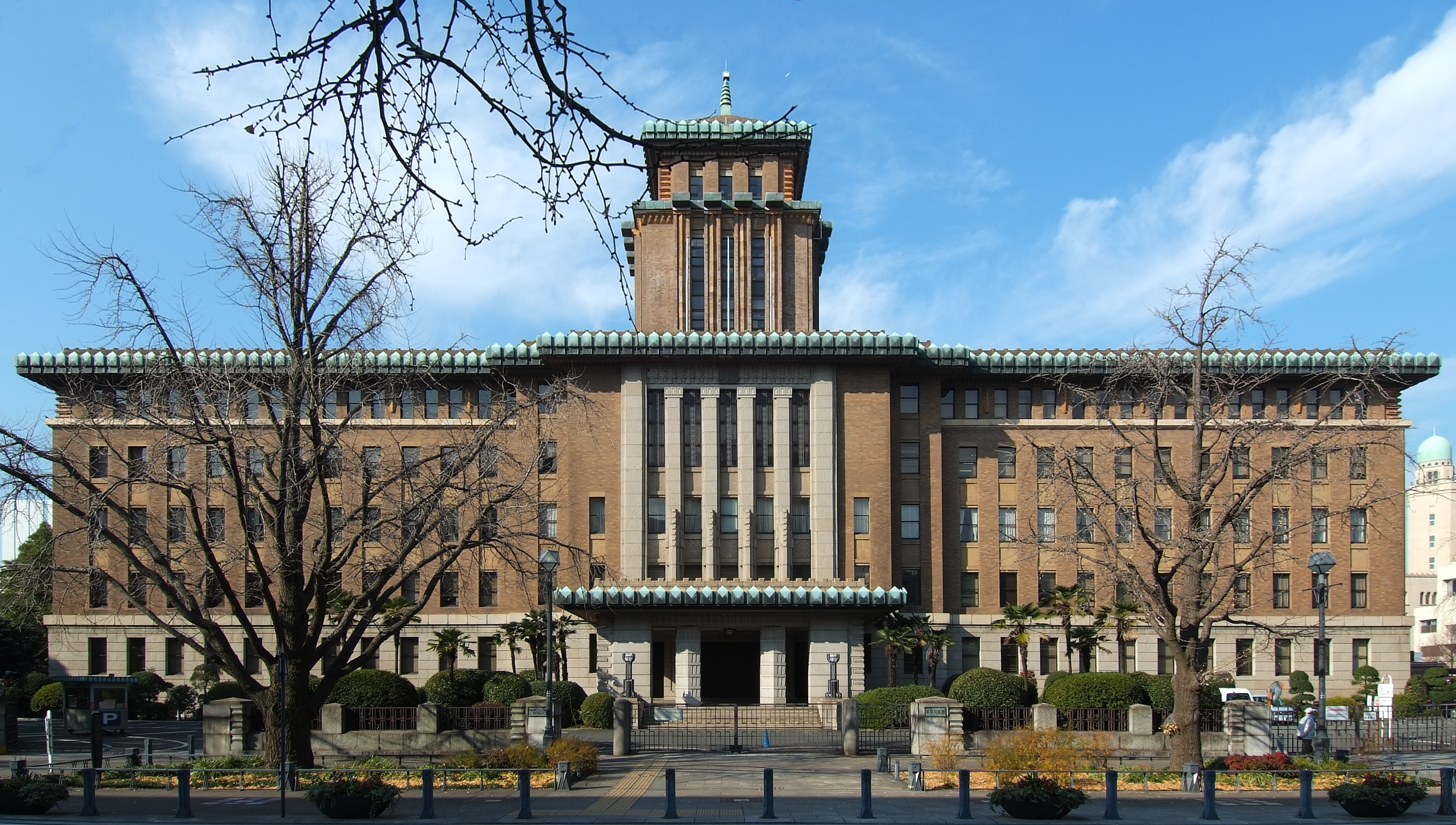
Kanagawa Prefectural Office (The King)

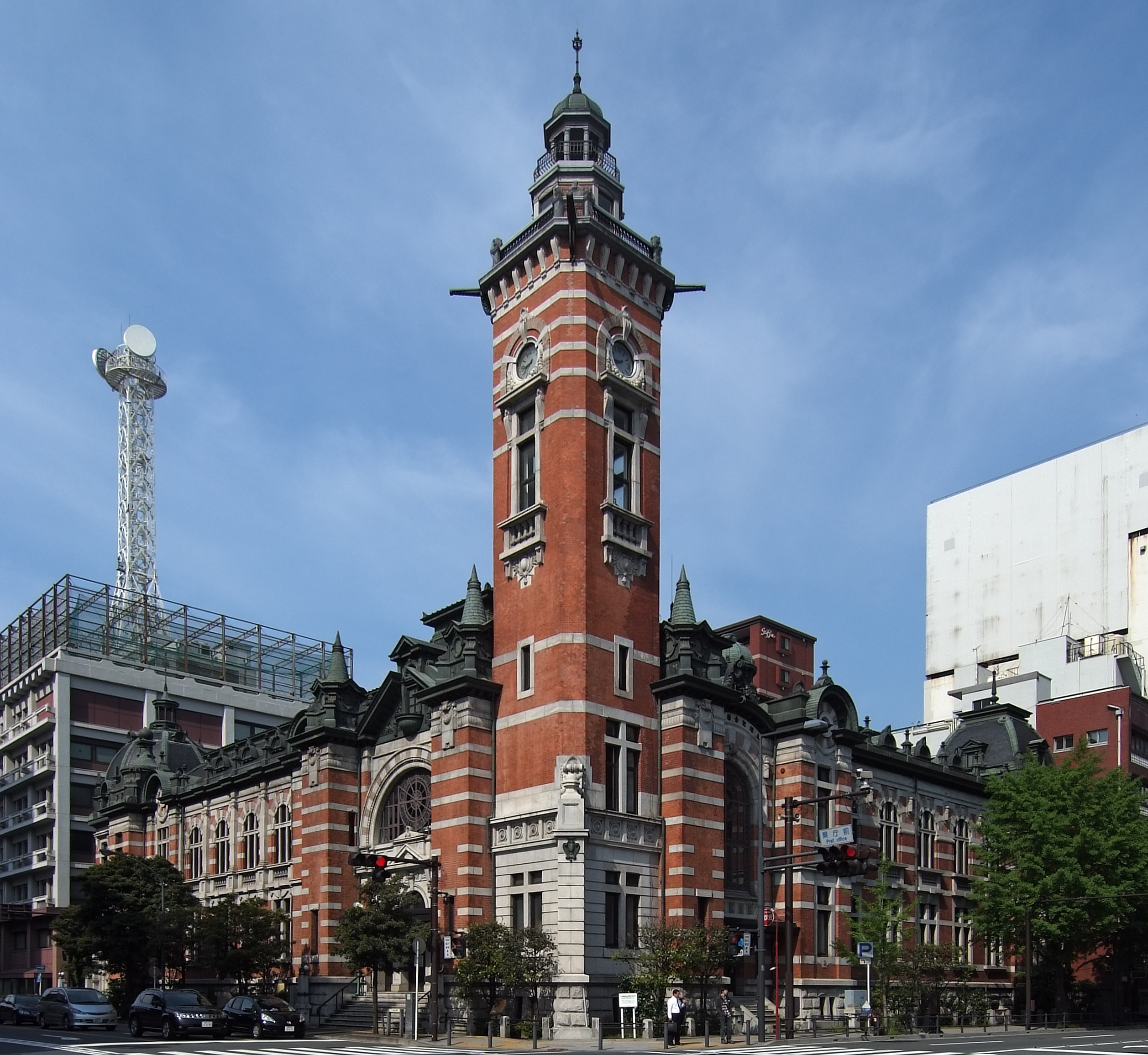
Yokohama Port Opening Memorial Hall (The Jack)

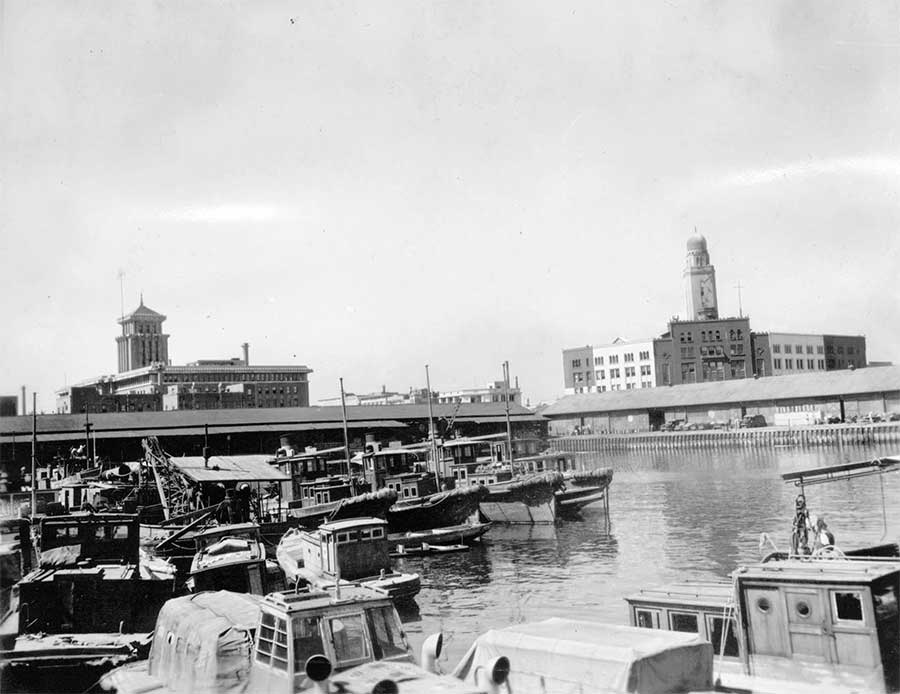
Two of The Three Yokohama Towers in 1945
