= Kanagawa Shimbun =

Japanese newspaper

- Logo and nameplate since January 2006

- Front page of Kanagawa Shimbun on September 28, 2026
- Type: Daily newspaper
- Format: Print, online
- Owner: Kanagawa Shimbun Ltd.
- Publisher: Kanagawa Shimbun Ltd.
- Founded: February 1, 1890; 136 years ago
- Political alignment: Liberalism (Japanese)
- Language: Japanese
- Headquarters: Naka-ku, Yokohama, Kanagawa Prefecture, Japan
- Country: Japan
- Website: https://www.kanaloco.jp/

The Kanagawa Shimbun (Japanese: 神奈川新聞, Hepburn: Kanagawa Shimbun), also known as The Kanagawa (stylized in all caps), is a newspaper in Yokohama, Kanagawa Prefecture, Japan, covering general news. It also publishes news on its website Kanaloco.

== History ==
It was first published on February 1, 1890, as Yokohama Bōeki Shimbun. It changed names to Yokohama Bōeki Shinpō in 1906.

On September 1, 1923, the company building of the newspaper collapsed following the Great Kanto Earthquake. It change its name again to Kanagawa-ken Shimbun in 1940. Due to the Empire of Japan's "One Prefecture, One Newspaper" policy, all of the newspapers in Kanagawa Prefecture, such as Kanagawa Nichinichi Shimbun, Kanagawa Kenshin Shimbun, and Sagami Gōdō Shimbun were merged and formed in February 1942.

The annual Kanagawa Shimbun Fireworks Festival, a fireworks display organized by the newspaper, began in 1986, initially taking place in Yamashita Park, since 1995, it has been held in Minato Mirai.

The newspaper was criticized by Japan Council against Atomic and Hydrogen Bombs (Gensuikyō) and other newspapers such as Mainichi Shimbun following plans to sponsor a concert by The Alfee at Atsugi Air Base, a United States military base, on August 9, 1992, the anniversary of the atomic bombing of Nagasaki. It was postponed on June 28. Kanagawa Shimbun explained that they "did not choose to sponsor it because it was to be held on a base"; rather, it was because there was no other suitable place to hold the concert."

In February 2005 the website of Kanagawa Shimbun was relaunched, and an online blog, Kanaloco, was started. It changed its nameplate font from using reishotai font (clerical script) to an original font on January 1, 2006. It is the first time to do so since January 1951.

A reporter from Kanagawa Shimbun was denied entry to a press conference of Sanseito on July 22, 2025., which sparked criticism from other newspapers.

== Contents ==
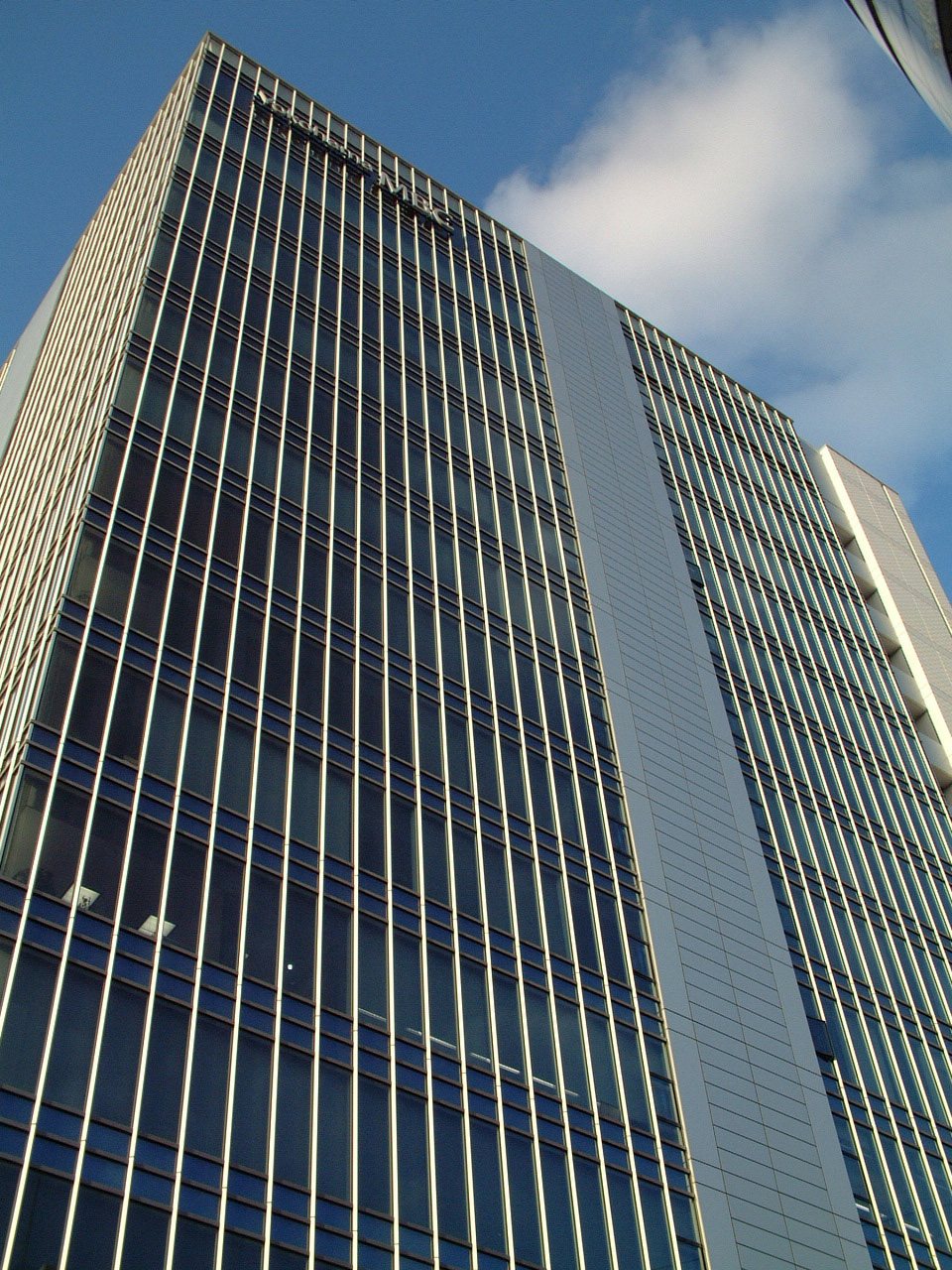
Yokohama Media Business Center, the headquarters of Kanagawa Shimbun in Yokohama

It publishes only a morning edition.

The newspaper was described as having a strong liberal editorial stance since the 1970s. It supported call for peace, disarmament and the abolition of nuclear arms. Ahead of the 1947 Japanese general election, Kanagawa Shimbun praised laborites for pursuing "more rational lines" in their "brisk" campaining.
