= 1730s =

Decade

The 1730s decade ran from January 1, 1730, to December 31, 1739.

== Events ==
=== 1730 ===
==== January–March ====
- January 30 (January 19 O.S.) – At dawn, Emperor Peter II of Russia dies of smallpox, aged 14 in Moscow, on the eve of his projected marriage.
- February 26 (February 15 O.S.) – Anna of Russia (Anna Ioannovna) becomes reigning Empress of Russia following the death of her cousin Emperor Peter II.
- February 28 – Vitus Bering returns to the Russian capital of Saint Petersburg after completing the First Kamchatka expedition.
- March 5 – The 1730 papal conclave to elect a new Pope for the Roman Catholic church begins with 30 Cardinals, 12 days after the death of Pope Benedict XIII. By the time his successor is elected on July 12, there are 56 Cardinals.
- March 9 – General Nader Khan of Persia opens the first campaign of the Ottoman–Persian War (1730–1735), guiding the Persian Army from Shiraz and starting the Western Persia Campaign against the Ottoman Empire.
- March 12 – John Glas is deposed from the Church of Scotland; the Glasite sect forms around him.
- March 16 – The establishment by Thomas Cresap of Wright's Ferry under the authority of the Province of Pennsylvania becomes the basis for Cresap's War, a nine-year-long conflict also known as the Maryland-Pennsylvania boundary dispute; the conflict mainly centers in Lancaster County, Pennsylvania and York County, Pennsylvania on either bank of the Susquehanna River.

==== April–June ====
- April 8 – Congregation Shearith Israel, the first synagogue in New York City, is dedicated.
- May 9 (April 28 O.S.) – The coronation of Anna of Russia as Empress of Russia takes place in Saint Petersburg.
- May 15 – Charles Townshend, 2nd Viscount Townshend, retires from his role in the government of Great Britain, leaving Robert Walpole as sole and undisputed leader of the Cabinet (i.e., prime minister). In the new Walpole ministry, Sir William Strickland, 4th Baronet, becomes Secretary at War, and Henry Pelham is Paymaster of the Forces; Spencer Compton, 1st Earl of Wilmington briefly becomes Lord Privy Seal.
- June 1 – Enslaved woman Sally Basset is put on trial for murder in Bermuda; she will eventually be convicted and burned at the stake.
- June 19 – At the urging of Sir William Gooch, the Virginia House of Burgesses passes the Virginia Tobacco Inspection Act to regulate the quality of tobacco in Virginia, 46 to 5.
- June 27 – French explorer Alphonse de Pontevez, commanding the frigate Le Lys, claims an Indian Ocean atoll for France and names it after himself as the Alphonse Atoll. The next day, he claims and names the St. François Atoll.

==== July–September ====
- July 8 – 1730 Valparaíso earthquake: An earthquake with an estimated magnitude of 9.1 strikes Valparaíso, in modern-day Chile but at this time in the Viceroyalty of Peru.
- July 12 – The papal conclave selects Cardinal Lorenzo Corsini over Cardinal Pietro Marcellino Corradini as the successor to Pope Benedict XIII. Corsini becomes Pope Clement XII as the 246th pope.
- August 4 – Maria Madlener becomes the last person to be executed after the Galgeninsel witch trials in Bavaria, and is beheaded by sword.
- August 5 – Prince Frederick of Prussia, the eldest son of King Frederick William and a high-ranking officer, attempts to flee to England after deserting the Prussian Army and is captured along with his fellow officer Hans Hermann von Katte. Katte is executed, and Crown Prince Frederick is imprisoned at Küstrin (modern-day Kostrzyn nad Odrą in Poland) for a year before being forgiven by his father. Prince Frederick later succeeds his father as King and will be remembered as Frederick the Great.
- August 12 – General Nader Khan of Persia captures Tabriz from the Ottoman Empire, bringing an end to the Western Persia Campaign, the first major action in the Ottoman–Persian War (1730–1735). Tabriz becomes a permanent part of Iran. Nader leaves the city four days later to begin the Herat Campaign of 1731.
- August 25 – French Protestant Marie Durand is imprisoned in the Tower of Constance at Aigues-Mortes for her defiance of the Roman Catholic government, and is kept captive for the next 38 years. During her incarceration, she continues to resist converting to Catholicism as a condition of release. She is finally set free on April 14, 1768 and lives 8 more years.
- September 1 – A volcano erupts on Lanzarote, the easternmost of the Canary Islands and threatens the Spanish inhabitants. On Gran Canaria, the regent of the islands reports to Madrid that the flames are visible even from 130 miles (210 km) away.
- September 17 – Mahmud I (d. 1754) succeeds Ahmed III (ruled since 1703) as Ottoman Emperor.

==== October–December ====
- October 22 – Construction of the Ladoga Canal, linking the Neva and Svir Rivers, one of the first major navigable canals constructed in Russia, is completed.
- November 6 – After being convicted of treason for attempting to desert the Prussian Army with Crown Prince Frederick, Hans Hermann von Katte is beheaded at the Küstrin Prison. Frederick's father, King Frederick William, forces the prince to watch the execution.
- December 9 – The first documented notice in North America about freemasonry is published in The Pennsylvania Gazette in an article by its publisher, Benjamin Franklin.
- December 27 – The Dutch East India Company ends an almost 11-year effort of trying to maintain a colony around Delagoa Bay in southern Africa in modern-day Mozambique. The entire population of the settlement, Fort Lydzammheid (near modern-day Maputo) is evacuated by the ships Snuffelaar, Zeepost and Feyenoord and the group returns to Cape Town.

==== Date unknown ====
- The Missouria tribe is almost destroyed when hundreds are killed in an attack by the Meskwawi and Sauk.

=== 1731 ===
==== January–March ====
- January 8 – An avalanche from the Skafjell mountain causes a massive wave in the Storfjorden fjord in Norway that sinks all boats that happen to be in the water at the time and kills people on both shores.
- February 3 – A fire in Brussels at the Coudenberg Palace, at this time the home of the ruling Austrian Duchess of Brabant, destroys the building, including the state records stored therein.
- February 16 – In China, the Emperor Yongzheng orders grain to be shipped from Hubei and Guangdong to the famine-stricken Shangzhou region of Shaanxi province.
- February 20 – Louise Hippolyte becomes the second woman to serve as Princess of Monaco, the reigning monarch of the tiny European principality, ascending upon the death of her father Prince Antonio. She reigns only nine months before dying of smallpox on December 29.
- March 16 – The Treaty of Vienna is signed between the Holy Roman Empire, Great Britain, the Dutch Republic and Spain.

==== April–June ====
- April 1 – Battle of Dabhoi in India is fought between Sarsenapati Trimbakrao Dabhade and Bajirao Peshwa.
- April 2 – The town of Raynham, Massachusetts in Bristol County is entered as a new town by the governor and court of Massachusetts, New England, America.
- April 9 – British trader Robert Jenkins has his ear cut off after his ship, Rebecca is boarded by Spanish coast guards at Havana in Cuba. The incident becomes the casus belli for the War of Jenkins' Ear in 1739.
- April 28 – A fire at White's Chocolate House, near St. James's Palace in London, destroys the historic club and the paintings therein, but is kept from spreading by the fast response of firemen.
- May 10 – The Pacific Fleet of the Russian Navy is established by order of the Empress Anna of Russia, who directs Grigory Skornyakov-Pisarev to assume command over the new fleet and to develop Okhotsk as a major port.
- June 4 – The English market town of Blandford Forum is destroyed by fire, with the exception of 26 houses. About one-third of the uninsured losses are paid for by the collection of disaster relief money.

==== July–September ====
- July 1 – Benjamin Franklin and fellow-subscribers start the Library Company of Philadelphia.
- August 15 – King Frederick William I of Prussia forgives his 19-year-old son, Prince Frederick, who has been confined since November to the town of Küstrin (now Kostrzyn nad Odrą in Poland) for his 1730 attempt to desert from the Prussian Army. Nine years later, having been politically rehabilitated, Prince Frederick succeeds his father as King and is later remembered as "Frederick the Great".
- August 23 – The oldest known sports score in history is recorded in the description of a cricket match at Richmond Green in England, when the team of Thomas Chambers of Middlesex defeats the Duke of Richmond's team by 119 to 79.
- September – The first successful appendectomy is performed by English surgeon William Cookesley.
- September 30 – The village of Barnwell, Cambridgeshire, England, is "burned down entirely" by a fire.

==== October–December ====
- October 23 – A fire at Ashburnham House in Westminster destroys 114 irreplaceable manuscripts (including a manuscript of the Anglo-Saxon Chronicle) and damages 98 others (among them the manuscript of Beowulf). Richard Bentley, the King's librarian and the House's owner, saves the only copy of the Codex Alexandrinus, carrying it under one arm as he leaps from a window. Bentley's ten year labor in translating the Greek Testament is ruined by the blaze. The remaining 844 manuscripts later form the heart of the collections of the British Library.
- November 25
  - Swiss mathematician Leonhard Euler announces his use of the irrational number e (approximately 2.71828) as the base for the concept of the natural logarithm, describing it in a letter to German mathematician Christian Goldbach.
  - Patrona Halil, an ethnic Albanian and a janissary who instigated a mass uprising in 1730 within the Ottoman Empire that brought Mahmud I to power as the new Sultan, is strangled to death in Mahmud's presence after the rebellion is suppressed.
- December 21 – The Maharaja Chhatrasal, monarch of Bundelkhand in India (part of the modern-day states of Uttar Pradesh and Madhya Pradesh) dies at the age of 82. His kingdom is divided into four parts, with one part going to Baji Rao I of the Marathas and the other three going to his three sons: Harde Sah gets the Panna State, Jagat Rai gets the Jaitpur State and Bharti Chand gets the Jaso State.
- December 29 – Jacques Grimaldi, the husband of the reigning monarch of Monaco, Louise Hippolyte, succeeds to the throne after Louise's death from smallpox. Jacques I rules until his own death in 1751.

==== Date unknown ====
- Royal Colony of North Carolina Governor George Burrington asks the North Carolina General Assembly to pass an act establishing a town on the Cape Fear River, in what is seen as a political move to shift the power away from the powerful Cape Fear plantation class. The town is laid out in 1733, and incorporated as Wilmington in 1740.
- Laura Bassi becomes the first official female university teacher, on being appointed professor of anatomy at the University of Bologna, at the age of 21.
- English scientist John Bevis observes the Crab Nebula for the first time in the modern era.
- The octant is developed by English mathematician John Hadley (it will eventually be replaced as a means of determining latitude by the sextant).
- The Royal Theatre of Mantua (Italy) is built by architect Ferdinando Galli Bibiena.

=== 1732 ===
==== January–March ====
- January 21 – Russia and Persia sign the Treaty of Riascha at Resht. Based on the terms of the agreement, Russia will no longer establish claims over Persian territories.
- February 9 – The Swedish East India Company begins its profitable first expedition to China, departing Gothenburg on the ship Friedericus Rex Sueciae under the command of Colin Campbell.
- February 14 – Henry Fielding's comedy The Modern Husband premieres at the Royal Theatre on Drury Lane in London.
- February 25 – John Stackhouse is appointed by the British East India Company as the new President of the Bengal Presidency and serves for seven years.
- February 27 – Herat Campaign: General Nader Shah of Persia (now Iran) suppresses the rebellion by Zulfiqar Khan in the city of Herat in what is now Afghanistan.
- March 19 – Chamaraja Wodeyar VII becomes the new Maharaja of the Kingdom of Mysore in Southern India, now the state of Karnataka and parts of Tamil Nadu and Andhra Pradesh.
- March 3 – English Captain Charles Gough rediscovers Gough Island in the South Atlantic.
- March 30 – MPs John Birch and Denis Bond are expelled from the House of Commons of Great Britain after using their positions on the Commission for Forfeited Lands to make fraudulent sales.

==== April–June ====
- April 12 – King Christian VI of Denmark-Norway signs the charter for the new Danish Asia Company (Dansk Asiatisk Kompagni), granting it a 40-year monopoly on Denmark-Norway's trade in Asia, leading to the creation of Danish India and cities of Trankebar (now Tharangambadi in Tamil Nadu), Frederiknagore (now Serampore in West Bengal) and the Frederiksøerne Islands (now the Nicobar Islands).
- April 16 – After his disastrous attempt to fight the Ottoman Empire, Shah Tahmasp II is removed from the throne of Iran by one of his generals, Nader Khan, who later proclaims himself the King of Persia in Tahmasp's place as Nader Shah.
- May 10 – Representatives of the heirs of William Penn and of Lord Baltimore, the respective owners of most of the land in the Province of Pennsylvania and the Province of Maryland set out the boundary between the two future U.S. states after a survey determines that Philadelphia is located on the Maryland side of the border. The dispute eventually leads to a lawsuit and the eventual survey by Charles Mason and Jeremiah Dixon to determine the Mason–Dixon line.
- May 13 – Rebels in Corsica agree to allow the Republic of Genoa to resume its administration of the island in return for amnesty and promised reforms.
- May 28 – Dirck van Cloon becomes the new Governor-General of the Dutch East Indies (now Indonesia).
- June 9 – James Oglethorpe is granted a royal charter for the colony of Georgia.

==== July–September ====
- July 2 – Spain completes the conquest of the Algerian cities of Oran and Mers El Kébir in the Oran Province, after a 17-day siege.
- August 16 – The Order of Malta under the command of Jacques-François de Chambray defeats a convoy of the Ottoman Empire and frees 14 Christian slaves, following the naval battle of Damietta.
- August 21 – Mikhail Gvozdev in the Sviatoi Gavriil makes the first known crossing of the Bering Strait, from Cape Dezhnev to Cape Prince of Wales in Alaska, marking the first time that Europeans have reached the northwest coast of North America.
- September 13 – The Treaty of the Three Black Eagles or the Treaty of Berlin, a secret treaty between the Austrian Empire, the Russian Empire and Prussia against the Polish–Lithuanian Commonwealth.
- September 16
  - The magnitude 5.8 Montreal earthquake occurs in Quebec (New France).
  - A military warehouse explosion kills up to two-thirds of the population of Campo Maior, Portugal.

==== October–December ====
- October 7 – French Army Lieutenant General Florent-Jean de Vallière is tasked by King Louis XV to improve France's method of forging cannons.
- October 16 – Russia approves the second Kamchatka expedition of Danish-born Russian cartographer Vitus Bering, and the Admiralty orders him to sail east and try to claim uncharted lands in North America.
- November 29 – The magnitude 6.6 Irpinia earthquake causes 1,940 deaths in the former Kingdom of Naples.
- December 5 – 139 members of the Parlement of Paris, exiled by order of King Louis XV, secure their recall.
- December 7 – The original Theatre Royal, Covent Garden, London (the modern-day Royal Opera House) is opened.
- December 19 – Benjamin Franklin, in the Pennsylvania Gazette, first advertises the publication of Poor Richard's Almanack, purportedly written by "Richard Saunders", a pen name used by Franklin. The book goes on sale on December 28. The annual publication will continue until 1758.

==== Date unknown ====
- Herman Boerhaave publishes the authorized edition of his Elementa chemiae, recognised as the first text on chemistry.
- The world's first lightship is moored at the Nore, in the Thames Estuary of England.
- This year's General Assembly of the Church of Scotland gives rise to the First Secession of 1733.

=== 1733 ===
==== January–March ====
- January 13 – Borommarachathirat V becomes King of Siam (now Thailand) upon the death of King Sanphet IX.
- January 27 – George Frideric Handel's classic opera, Orlando is performed for the first time, making its debut at the King's Theatre in London.
- February 12 – British colonist James Oglethorpe founds Savannah, Georgia.
- March 21 – The Molasses Act is passed by British House of Commons, which reinforces the negative opinions of the British by American colonists. The Act then goes to the House of Lords, which consents to it on May 4 and it receives royal assent on May 17.
- March 25 – English replaces Latin and Law French as the official language of English and Scottish courts following the enforcement of the Proceedings in Courts of Justice Act 1730.

==== April–June ====
- April 6
  - After British Prime Minister Robert Walpole's proposed excise tax bill results in rioting over the imposition of additional taxes and the use of government agents to collect them, Walpole informs the House of Commons that he will withdraw the legislation.
  - Royal Colony of North Carolina Commissioners John Watson, Joshua Grainger, Michael Higgins and James Wimble begin selling lots for the town of New Carthage (which is later renamed and is now Wilmington, North Carolina), on the east side of the Cape Fear River.
- May 1 – The canton system is first introduced in Prussia.
- May 17 – The Molasses Act receives royal assent and begins to go into effect on June 24.
- May 26 – The introduction of John Kay's Flying Shuttle which revolutionized the textile industry and marked the beginning of the Industrial Revolution.
- May 29 – The right of Canadians to keep Indian slaves is upheld at Quebec.
- June 12 – At Schloss Salzdahlum, Prince Frederick of Prussia, the 21-year-old heir to the throne reluctantly marries Duchess Elisabeth Christine of Brunswick-Bevern in order to avoid prosecution for desertion from the Prussian Army and to be guaranteed the throne. Despite the unhappy marriage Frederick and Elisabeth later reign as King and Queen Consort of Prussia.
- June 15 – The Danish West India Company buys the island of Saint Croix from France for 750,000 livres.

==== July–September ====
- July 15 – A hurricane off of the coast of the Florida Keys wrecks at least 17 Spanish ships.
- July 30 – The first Freemasons lodge, the Grand Lodge of Massachusetts, opens in what will become the United States of America.
- August 19 – In Warsaw as Stanislas Leszczynski appears to be on the verge of being elected King of Poland, Russia, Austria and Saxony sign Löwenwolde's Treaty (named for Russian diplomat Karl Gustav von Löwenwolde), pledging to go to war to place Frederick Augustus, son of the late King Augustus II, on the throne.
- September 12 – Stanislas Leszczynski, who had been King of Poland from 1704 to 1709 until being driven from the throne by King Augustus II, is returned to office by the vote of the Sejm. Russia and Austria protest the election, since King Stanislaus is backed by France and Sweden.
- September 26 – The Treaty of Turin is signed in Turin as a secret agreement between King Louis XV of France and King Charles Emmanuel III of Sardinia.

==== October–December ====
- October 5 – The election of Augustus III, to succeed his father as King of Poland, sparks the War of the Polish Succession.
- October 10 – France declares war on Austria and Saxony.
- October 24 – The Battle of Kirkuk starts which will lead to the defeat of the Ottoman army under general Topal Osman Pasha.
- November 23 – The 1733 slave insurrection on St. John begins: Slaves from Akwamu rebel against their owners in the Danish West Indies.
- December 19 – Unsuccessful in capturing Baghdad from the Ottoman Empire, Persia's ruler Nader Shah signs the Treaty of Baghdad with the Ottoman Governor, Ahmad Khan Pasha, with the Turks and the Iranians agreeing to restore the boundary between the two empires to the lines before the 1732 Ottoman invasion of Iran.
- December 25 – The Molasses Act goes into full effect.

=== 1734 ===
==== January– March ====
- January 8 – Salzburgers, Lutherans who were expelled by the Roman Catholic Bishop of Salzburg, Austria, in October 1731, set sail for the British Colony of Georgia in America.
- February 16 – The Ostend Company, established in 1722 in the Austrian Netherlands (modern-day Belgium) to compete for trade in the West Indies (the Caribbean islands) and the East Indies (south and southeast Asia), ceases business as part of the agreement by Austria in the Second Treaty of Vienna.
- March 12 – Salzburgers arrive at the mouth of the Savannah River in the British Colony of Georgia.

==== April–June ====
- April 25 – Easter occurs on the latest possible date (the next time is in 1886).
- May 15 – Prince Charles of Spain (later King Charles III) becomes the new King of Naples and Sicily, five days after his arrival in Naples.
- May 25 – Spanish forces under the command of José Carrillo de Albornoz, 1st Duke of Montemar, defeat the Austrian forces, completing the conquest of the Kingdom of Naples at the Battle of Bitonto.
- May 27 – French and Swiss troops suppress the slave insurrection in the Danish West Indies on the island of Saint John (part of the modern-day U.S. Virgin Islands) after six months and restore control of the plantations to the Danish owners.
- June 6 – With the conclusion of the British general election (voting having begun in some constituencies on April 22), the Whigs, led by Prime Minister Robert Walpole, lose 85 seats but retain their majority.
- June 17 – French troops take Philippsburg, but the Duke of Berwick is killed.
- June 21 – In Montreal, New France, a black slave known by the French name of Marie-Joseph Angélique is tortured then hanged by the French authorities for allegedly setting a fire that destroyed part of the city.
- June 30 – War of the Polish Succession: Russian troops take Gdańsk (German: Danzig), which had been besieged since February 1734, after the failure of a French expedition to relieve the city.

==== July–September ====
- July 18 – The Siege of the Austrian fortress of Philippsburg (near Karlsruhe, Germany) by the French Army, ends after eight weeks as its Austrian defenders surrender.
- August 6 – The armies of Spain and France, led by the Duke of Parma (and future King Charles III of Spain) storm the city of Gaeta in Naples, ending a four-month siege.
- September 28 – Abdu'llah bin Ismail as-Samin is deposed after a 15-year reign as Sultan of Morocco.

==== October–December ====
- October 23 – Jamaica's Governor John Ayscough declares martial law to fight the slave rebellion that began in 1733, then drafts 600 men into the colonial army to march into the Blue Mountains. (→ First Maroon War)
- October 31 – Chief Tomochichi of the Yamacraw band of the Muscogee Nation ends a successful four and a half month visit to Great Britain, along with Georgia Governor James Oglethorpe and other Yamacraw Indians, after having signed the cession of the area of modern day Savannah, Georgia to the Georgia Company. On June 16, he and the Muscogee delegation (Senauki, Toonahowi, Hillispilli, Umpichi, Apokutchi, Santachi and Stimaletchi) had been welcomed as guests of King George II. The group departs on HMS Aldborough after completing the visit by the largest delegation of Native Americans since 1616.
- November 5 – The Dzików Confederation is created in Poland.
- December 24 – A fire destroys the Royal Alcázar of Madrid, the residence of the Spanish royal family, along with more than 400 valuable paintings, 100 sculptures and thousands of documents.

==== Undated ====
- Creation of the Kanem–Bornu Empire after Kanem is taken over by the Sultan of Bornu.
- Anton Wilhelm Amo becomes the first African to receive a doctorate in Europe and begins teaching at the University of Halle.

=== 1735 ===
==== January–March ====
- January 2 – Alexander Pope's poem Epistle to Dr Arbuthnot is published in London.
- January 8 – George Frideric Handel's opera Ariodante is premièred at the Royal Opera House in Covent Garden, London.
- February 3 – All 256 people on board the Dutch East India Company ships Vliegenthart and Anna Catherina die when the two ships sink in a gale off of the Netherlands coast. The wreckage of Vliegenthart remains undiscovered until 1981.
- February 14 – The Order of St. Anna is established in Russia, in honor of the daughter of Peter the Great.
- March 10 – The Russian Empire and Persia sign the Treaty of Ganja, with Russia ceding territories in the Caucasus mountains to Persia, and the two rivals forming a defensive alliance against the Ottoman Empire.
- March 11 – Abraham Patras becomes the Governor-General of the Dutch East Indies (now Indonesia) upon the death of Dirck van Cloon.

==== April–June ====
- April 13 – Emperor Sakuramachi accedes to the throne of Japan.
- April 16 – Alcina, George Frideric Handel's Italian opera, premieres at the Royal Opera House in Covent Garden, London.
- May 22 – George Hadley publishes the first explanation of the trade winds.
- June 15 – Lê Thuần Tông, Emperor of Đại Việt since 1732, dies at the age of 36 and is succeeded by Lê Ý Tông.
- June 25 – In Great Britain, the Engraving Copyright Act 1734, the first of a series of copyright protection laws, takes effect after being given royal assent by King George II.

==== July–September ====
- July 11 – Pluto (not known at this time) enters a fourteen-year period inside the orbit of Neptune, which will not recur until 1979.
- August 16 (August 5 old style– John Peter Zenger of The New York Weekly Journal becomes a symbol of freedom of the press when he acquitted of seditious libel against William Cosby, the British Governor of the Province of New York. A jury concludes that what Zenger published was true.
- September 4 – Al-Husayn I ibn Ali, the first Bey of Tunis (now Tunisia) is defeated at the Battle of Smindja by Abu l-Hasan Ali I with the help of Ibrahim ben Ramdan, the Dey of Algiers.
- September 14 – The Kingdom of France approves the issue of "card money" in the total amount of 200,000 livres to serve as currency in its Louisiana territory in America.
- September 22 – Sir Robert Walpole, the Prime Minister of Great Britain, becomes the first British premier to move into London's 10 Downing Street.

==== October –December ====
- October 3 – An agreement between the European powers brings a ceasefire in the War of the Polish Succession, one week short of the second anniversary of the war. With France and Spain on the side of the reigning monarch, Stanisław Leszczyński, and Prussia, Russia, and Austria supporting Augustus III, a preliminary peace is signed that was ratified in 1738 as the Treaty of Vienna. By the terms of the treaty, Stanisław Leszczyński renounced his claim on the Polish throne and recognized Augustus III, Duke of Saxony. As compensation he received instead the duchies of Lorraine and Bar which were to pass to France upon his death.
- October 14 – John Wesley and his brother Charles set sail from England for Savannah in the Province of Georgia in British America; on the voyage they first encounter members of the Moravian Church.
- October 18 – In China, Qianlong succeeds his father, Yongzheng, as Emperor and begins a 60-year-long reign within the Qing dynasty.
- November 25 – The largest bell in the world, the 22 foot (6.7 m) diameter Tsar Kolokol, is successfully cast in Moscow within the Kremlin.
- November 30 – The Netherlands becomes the first government to announce a prohibition against citizens joining the Freemasons.
- December 6 – The second successful appendectomy is performed by naturalised British surgeon Claudius Aymand at St George's Hospital in London (the first was in 1731).
- December 19 – At the age of 8 years old, Prince Luis of Spain becomes the youngest Roman Catholic Cardinal in history, after being named by Pope Clement XII.

==== Date unknown ====
- Russo-Turkish War, 1735-1739: Russian forces fail to occupy the Crimea, due to rasputitsa.
- Linnaeus publishes his Systema Naturae.
- A shipbuilding industry begins in Mumbai.
- Leonhard Euler solves the Basel problem, first posed by Pietro Mengoli in 1644, and the Seven Bridges of Königsberg problem.
- The King's Highway (Charleston to Boston) is completed.
- Quebec: Construction begins on the Chemin du roy between Quebec and Montreal.
- Augusta, Georgia, is founded.
- Cobalt is discovered and isolated by Georg Brandt.

=== 1736 ===
==== January–March ====
- January 12 – George Hamilton, 1st Earl of Orkney, becomes the Second Field Marshal of Great Britain.
- January 23 – The Civil Code of 1734 is passed in Sweden.
- January 26 – Stanislaus I of Poland abdicates his throne.
- February 12 – Francis I, Holy Roman Emperor marries Maria Theresa of Austria, ruler of the Habsburg Empire at the Augustinian Church in Vienna.
- March 8 – Nader Shah, founder of the Afsharid dynasty, is crowned Shah of Iran on a date selected by court astrologers.
- March 31 – Bellevue Hospital is founded in New York.

==== April–June ====
- April 14
  - The Porteous Riots erupt in Edinburgh (Scotland), after the execution of smuggler Andrew Wilson, when town guard Captain John Porteous orders his men to fire at the crowd. Porteous is arrested later.
  - German adventurer Theodor Stephan Freiherr von Neuhoff is crowned King Theodore of Corsica, 25 days after his arrival on Corsica on March 20. His reign ends on November 5 when he flees the island.
- April 19 – A fire in Stony Stratford, England, consumes 53 houses.
- April – The Genbun era begins in Japan. The era of Kyōhō Reforms ends.
- May 8 – Frederick, Prince of Wales, marries Princess Augusta of Saxe-Gotha.
- May 22 – King George II of Great Britain departs for Europe as part of his duties as Elector of Hanover; his wife, Caroline, Queen Consort rules on his behalf as the Regent for the last time until his return on January 14, 1736.
- May 26 – Battle of Ackia: British and Chickasaw Native Americans defeat French troops.
- June 8 – Leonhard Euler writes to James Stirling describing the Euler–Maclaurin formula, providing a disconnection between integrals and sums.
- June 19 – A French Academy of Sciences expedition, led by Pierre Louis Maupertuis, with Anders Celsius, begins work on measuring a meridian arc in Meänmaa, Finland.
- June 24 – Witchcraft Act 1735 (9 Geo. 2. c. 5) in Great Britain comes into effect, criminalizing claimants accusing people of practising witchcraft or of possessing magical powers, intended to end legal witch trials in the early modern period in the country.

==== July–September ====
- July 1 – Russo-Turkish War (1735–39): Russian forces under Peter Lacy storm the Ottoman fortress of Azov.
- August 12 – A fire in Saint Petersburg, capital of the Russian Empire, destroys 2,000 buildings, the city's post office, and several palaces.
- September 7 – An Edinburgh crowd drags John Porteous out of his cell in Tolbooth Prison, and lynches him.
- September 29 – The Gin Act 1736 goes into effect, placing a steep tax on the sale of gin and license requirements for its sale, with the intent of reducing consumption of the liquor in Britain. Widely ignored, the Act is repealed in 1743.

==== October–December ====
- October 3 – French scientist Charles Marie de La Condamine and a team of surveyors begin the first measurements at the Equator to determine the exact meridian arc measurement of distance between points separated by one degree of longitude in order to make a precise calculation of the Earth's circumference. The initial measurements of this French Geodesic Mission to the Equator, made in what is now Ecuador, last until November 3. The same year the French Geodesic Mission to Lapland took place. Both confirm Isaac Newton's prediction that the Figure of the Earth is flattened at the poles.
- November 5 – King Theodore of Corsica flees the island after a reign of seven months and the kingdom reverts to Genoese control.
- November 13 – Word of the discovery of silver, south of what is now the U.S.-Mexican border, reaches Sonora Governor Juan Bautista Anza and soon leads to prospectors coming to Nogales to find more silver. Late in October, a Yaqui Indian prospector, Antonio Siraumea, had discovered large slabs of silver ("Las planchas de plata"), and at the Estancia Arizona, a ranch owned by Captain Bernardo de Urrea. The region, and later the U.S. territory, and state of Arizona are named for Urrea's ranch.
- December 7 – Benjamin Franklin builds the first volunteer fire company in Philadelphia.
- December 26 – Andrew Michael Ramsay gives an oration, in which he relates the heritage and internationalism of Freemasonry to that of the Crusades.

==== Date unknown ====
- Neustrelitz becomes the capital of Mecklenburg-Strelitz.
- Bushehr is founded in Persia.
- The Belgrade Fortress is completed.
- One of the earliest records of use of a bathing machine is made at Scarborough, England.
- Charles Marie de La Condamine, with François Fresneau Gataudière, makes the first scientific observations of rubber, in Ecuador.
- Leonhard Euler produces the first published proof of Fermat's "little theorem".
- Sir Isaac Newton's Method of Fluxions (1671), describing his method of differential calculus, is first published (posthumously) and Thomas Bayes publishes a defense of its logical foundations (anonymously).
- Muhammad ibn Abd al-Wahhab writes the Kitab at-tawhidt, marking the beginning of Wahhabism.
- The Haidamakas raid the shtetl of Pavoloch, killing 35.

=== 1737 ===
==== January–March ====
- January 5 – Spain and the Holy Roman Empire sign instruments of cession at Pontremoli in the Grand Duchy of Tuscany in Italy, with the Empire receiving control of Tuscany and the Grand Duchy of Parma and Piacenza, in return for Don Carlos of Spain being recognized as King of Naples and King of Sicily.
- January 9 – The Empires of Austria and Russia enter into a secret military alliance that leads to Austria's disastrous entry into the Russo-Turkish War.
- January 18 – In Manila, a peace treaty is signed between Spain's Governor-General of the Philippines, Fernándo Valdés y Tamon, and the Sultan Azim ud-Din I of Sulu, recognizing Azim's authority over the islands of the Sulu Archipelago.
- February 20 – France's Foreign Minister, Germain Louis Chauvelin, is dismissed by King Louis XV's Chief Minister, Cardinal André-Hercule de Fleury
- February 27 – French scientists Henri-Louis Duhamel du Monceau and Georges-Louis Leclerc de Buffon publish the first study correlating past weather conditions with an examination of tree rings.
- March 16 – In Paris, representatives of Spain and Portugal sign an armistice bringing an end to the Spanish–Portuguese War over the area now occupied by the nation of Uruguay and the area now occupied by the state of Rio Grande do Sul in Brazil. The news does not reach the fighting parties until five months later.
- March 28 – The Battle of Delhi takes place between the Maratha Empire and the Mughals.

==== April–June ====
- April 5 – French Jesuit priest Jean-François Régis is canonized as Saint Regis by the Roman Catholic Church under the reign of Pope Clement XII.
- April 22
  - In Afghanistan, Persian shah Nader Shah begins the 11-month Siege of Kandahar against the Pashtun Emir of Afghanistan, Hussain Hotak. The surviving Afghanis surrender on March 24, 1738.
  - Lots are first advertised for sale in the new town of Richmond, Virginia, by the placement of a notice by William Byrd in the Virginia Gazette. According to the paper, "... on the North Side of James River, near the Uppermost Landing, and a little below the Falls, is lately laid off by Major Mayo, a Town, called Richmond, with Streets 65 Feet wide, in a pleasant and healthy Situation, and well supply'd with Springs of good Water. It lies near the Publick Warehouse at Shoccoe's, and in the midst of great Quantities of Grain, and all kind of Provisions. The Lots will be granted in Fee Simple, on Condition only of building a House in Three Years Time, of 24 by 16 Feet, fronting within 5 Feet of the Street. The Lots to be rated according to the Convenience of their Situation, and to be sold after this April General Court, by me, William Byrd."
- May 28 – The planet Venus passes in front of Mercury. The event is witnessed during the evening hours, by the amateur astronomer John Bevis, at the Royal Greenwich Observatory. As of 2006, it is still the only such planet/planet occultation that has been directly observed.
- June 21 – In Britain, the Theatrical Licensing Act requires plays to be submitted to the Lord Chamberlain for censorship.
- June 30 – Russo-Turkish War, 1735-1739: Russian forces under Field Marshal Munnich storm the Ottoman fortress of Ochakov, and take prisoner 4,000 Turks.

==== July–September ====
- July 9 – The direct male line of the Medici family becomes extinct, with the death of Gian Gastone de' Medici, Grand Duke of Tuscany.
- July 12 – Austria enters the Russo-Turkish War as an ally of Russia against the Ottoman Empire.
- July 17 – The British ship Catherine founders in a storm off of Nova Scotia's Cape Sable Island during its voyage from Ireland to Boston, killing 98 of the 201 people on board.
- August 4 – Austria's army is defeated by the Ottoman Army and Bosnian defenders in the Battle of Banja Luka.
- August 15 – The Portuguese frigate Nossa Senhora da Boa Viagem arrives at Maldonado (now in Uruguay) as Captain Duarte Pereira brings the news that the Spanish–Portuguese War ended by an agreement signed on March 16.
- September 1 – The oldest existing English language newspaper in the world, The News Letter, is founded in Belfast, Ireland.
- September 20 – Runner Edward Marshall completes his journey in the Walking Purchase, forcing the cession of 1,200,000 acres (4,900 km^{2}) of Lenape-Delaware tribal land to the Province of Pennsylvania.

==== October–December ====
- October 7 – At least 300,000 people are killed when a tropical cyclone strikes the Bay of Bengal in India and modern-day Bangladesh. The storm sends 12 m (39 ft) high waves over the Sundarbans delta, and overflows the Hooghly River.
- October 11 – The first national stage in Sweden opens, when Carl Gyllenborg's play Den svenska sprätthöken is performed in the Swedish language, by the first native actors, on the stage of Bollhuset in Stockholm.
- October 16 – An earthquake with an estimated magnitude of 9.3 occurs off the shore of Russia's Kamchatka Peninsula. Tsunamis up to 60 metres (200 ft) high follow in the Pacific ocean.
- November 4 – The Teatro di San Carlo, the oldest working opera house in Europe, is inaugurated in Naples, Italy.
- December 24 – General Baji Rao I of the Maratha Empire in India defeats the armies of the rulers of Hyderabad, Oudh, Bhopal and Jaipur in the Battle of Bhopal.
- December – John Wesley leaves Savannah, Georgia, and returns to England.

==== Date unknown ====
- Benjamin Franklin creates the Philadelphia Police Force – the first city-paid force.
- The Georg August University of Göttingen in Lower Saxony is opened to students.
- Our Lady of Guadalupe is designated the patron saint of Mexico City.
- Lancaster County Prison, Lancaster, Pennsylvania is first constructed, in response to the seven preceding violent years of the ongoing Cresap's War in the Maryland-Pennsylvania boundary dispute and war.

=== 1738 ===
==== January–March ====
- January 1 – At least 664 African slaves drown when the Dutch West Indies Company slave ship Leusden capsizes and sinks in the Maroni River during its arrival in Surinam. The Dutch crew escapes, and leaves the slaves locked below decks to die.
- January 3 – George Frideric Handel's opera Faramondo is given its first performance.
- January 7 – After the Maratha Empire of India wins the Battle of Bhopal over the Jaipur State, Jaipur cedes the Malwa territory to the Maratha in a treaty signed at Doraha.
- February 4 – Court Jew Joseph Süß Oppenheimer is executed in Württemberg.
- February 11 – Jacques de Vaucanson stages the first demonstration of an early automaton, The Flute Player at the Hotel de Longueville in Paris, and continues to display it until March 30.
- February 20 – The Swedish Levant Company is founded.
- March 28 – Mariner Robert Jenkins presents a pickled ear, which he claims was cut off by a Spanish captain in the Caribbean in 1731, to the Parliament of Great Britain, which votes, 257 to 209, for war against Spain, leading to the War of Jenkins' Ear the following year.
- March/April – Battle of the Dindar River: Emperor Iyasu II of Ethiopia is defeated by the Funj people.

==== April–June ====
- April 15 – Serse, an Italian opera by George Frideric Handel, premieres in London.
- April 18 – Spain's Royal Academy of History (Real Academia de la Historia) is established by decree of King Philip V of Spain.
- April 28 – Pope Clement XII issues the papal bull In eminenti apostolatus, prohibiting Roman Catholics from being members of Masonic societies.
- May 4 – The Imperial Theatrical School, in modern times known as Vaganova Academy of Russian Ballet, is founded under the reign of Empress Anna. It is the first ballet school in Russia and second in the world.
- May 24 – John Wesley, newly returned from America, experiences a spiritual rebirth at a Moravian Church meeting in Aldersgate, in the City of London, essentially launching the Methodist movement; the day is celebrated annually by Methodists as Aldersgate Day (his younger brother Charles had a similar experience three days earlier).
- May 25 – The military phase of Cresap's War between the British North American Provinces of Maryland and Pennsylvania is ended when King George II of Great Britain negotiates a cease-fire.
- June 24 – British inventor Lewis Paul receives a patent for roller cotton-spinning machinery.
- June 27 – The Spanish Empire's Council of the Indies votes, 6 to 4, to re-establish the Viceroyalty of New Granada, incorporating modern-day Colombia, Ecuador, Venezuela and Panama. King Philip V issues the order on August 20, 1738.

==== July–September ====
- July 1 – English metallurgist William Champion is granted a patent for his process of extracting zinc from other materials in a furnace.
- July 10 – Thomas Pellow of Cornwall finally escapes captivity, 23 years after having been captured by Barbary pirates and held as a slave in Morocco. He arrives in British territory when the ship he is on sails into Gibraltar Bay on July 21, and later recounts his story in the book The Adventures of Thomas Pellow, of Penryn, Mariner: Three and Twenty Years in Captivity Among the Moors.
- August 10 – Russo-Turkish War (1735–1739): The Russian army begins its attempt to cross the Dniester River and fails after three weeks; it is later decimated by plague.
- September 18 – Samuel Johnson composes his first solemn prayer (published 1785).

==== October–December ====
- October 22 – The excavation of Herculaneum, a Roman city buried by Vesuvius in AD 79, begins near the Italian city of Resina on orders from King Charles III of Spain to his engineer, Rocque Joaquin de Alcubierre.
- November 18 – The Treaty of Vienna is ratified, ending the War of the Polish Succession. Under the terms of the treaty, Stanisław Leszczyński receives Lorraine in exchange for renouncing the Polish throne.
- December 27 – After setting off from Rotterdam in August with 240 immigrants to America, the British ship Princess Augusta is wrecked near Block Island off of the coast of the colony of Rhode Island. During the voyage, 200 passengers and seven crew die from illness spread by contaminated water. Another 20 die after the crew leaves and rows to shore. The wreck later becomes the subject of the legend of the "Palatine Light" ghost ship and of John Greenleaf Whittier's 1867 poem "The Palatine".

==== Date unknown ====
- China's Qing government announces that all western businessmen have to use the Cohong in Guangzhou to trade.
- Pierre Louis Maupertuis publishes Sur la figure de la terre, which confirms Newton's view that the earth is an oblate spheroid, slightly flattened at the poles.
- Black Forest clockmaker Franz Ketterer produces one of the earliest cuckoo clocks.
- Carl Philipp Emanuel Bach, having completed a law degree, is hired as a court musician by Crown Prince Frederick of Prussia, the future Frederick the Great (Bach will remain in Frederick's service until 1768).
- Holy Royal Arch is founded.
- Rémy Martin is granted exclusive permission by King Louis XV of France to plant new vineyards, for impressing him with the quality of his cognac.

=== 1739 ===
==== January–March ====
- January 1 – Bouvet Island is discovered by French explorer Jean-Baptiste Charles Bouvet de Lozier, in the South Atlantic Ocean.
- January 3 – A 7.6 earthquake shakes the Ningxia Hui Autonomous Region in China killing 50,000 people.
- February 24 – Battle of Karnal: The army of Iranian ruler Nader Shah defeats the forces of the Mughal emperor of India, Muhammad Shah.
- March 20 – Nader Shah occupies Delhi, India and sacks the city, stealing the jewels of the Peacock Throne, including the Koh-i-Noor.

==== April–June ====
- April 7 – English highwayman Dick Turpin is executed by hanging for horse theft.
- May 12 – John Wesley lays the foundation stone of the New Room, Bristol in England, the world's first Methodist meeting house.
- June 13 – (June 2 Old Style); The Royal Swedish Academy of Sciences is founded in Stockholm, Sweden.

==== July–September ====
- July 9 – The first group purporting to represent an all-England cricket team, consisting of 11 players from various parts of England, comes to Kent and loses to the renowned Kent team, led by Lord John Sackville.
- July 12 – The British East India Company signs a treaty with the Maratha Empire to gain the right of free trade within the territory.
- July 22 – The Ottoman Empire retakes Belgrade from Austria's Habsburg monarchy after winning the Battle of Grocka.
- August 20 – The Viceroyalty of New Granada, incorporating modern-day Colombia, Ecuador, and Venezuela is re-established by the royal cedula of King Philip V of Spain, 16 years after it had been dissolved, and adds the territory of Panama as well.
- September 9 – The Stono Rebellion, a slave rebellion, erupts near Charleston, South Carolina.
- September 18 – The Treaty of Belgrade brings the Austro-Russian–Turkish War (1735–39) to an end.

==== October–December ====
- October 3 – The Treaty of Niš is signed.
- October 12 – The town of Utuado, Puerto Rico was founded by Sebastian de Morfi.
- October 17 – The Foundling Hospital is created in London by royal charter.
- October 23 – War of Jenkins' Ear: Great Britain declares war on Spain.
- November 20–22 – War of Jenkins' Ear – Battle of Porto Bello: British marine forces capture the Panamanian silver-exporting town of Portobelo from the Spanish.
- December 30– Months of unseasonably cold weather begin in Ireland, precipitating the Irish Famine of 1740, known as Bliain an Áir ("The Year of Slaughter"). A January 5 dispatch from Dublin to the Stamford Mercury says "Since last Wednesday we have had the most violent cold Weather that was ever known in this Kingdom; hard Frost began that evening, which has continued ever since with a very stormy Wind at South-East." At least 13% of Ireland's population dies of starvation in the year that follows.

==== Date unknown ====
- Ecuador, part of Real Audiencia of Quito, becomes a part of New Granada, instead of Peru.
- 84,000 farmers revolt in the province of Iwaki in Japan.
- A Plinian eruption of Mount Tarumae volcano occurs in Japan.
- The first Bible in Estonian is published.

== Births ==
1730

- January 3 – Velu Nachiyar, queen regnant of Sivaganga (d. 1796)
- March 7 – Louis Auguste Le Tonnelier de Breteuil, last prime minister of the French monarchy (d. 1807)
- April 1 – Salomon Gessner, Swiss painter and newspaper publisher (d. 1788)
- April 16 – Henry Clinton, British general (d. 1795)
- April 26 – John Moore, Archbishop of Canterbury (d. 1805)
- May 13 – Charles Watson-Wentworth, 2nd Marquess of Rockingham, Prime Minister of Great Britain (d. 1782)
- May 28 – Maria Angela Ardinghelli, Italian scientific translator (d. 1825)
- June 21 – Motoori Norinaga, Japanese philologist, scholar of the kokugaku school (d. 1801)
- July 10 – Jean-Baptiste Willermoz, French Freemason (d. 1824)
- July 12
  - Anna Barbara Reinhart, Swiss mathematician (d. 1796)
  - Josiah Wedgwood, English pottery manufacturer and abolitionist (d. 1795)
- July 26 – Charles Messier, French astronomer (d. 1817)
- August 1 – Frederick Hervey, 4th Earl of Bristol, English Anglican prelate (d. 1803)
- August 27 – Johann Georg Hamann, German philosopher (d. 1788)
- September 7 – Elisabetta de Gambarini, English composer (d. 1765)
- September 17 – Friedrich Wilhelm von Steuben, Prussian army officer (d. 1794)
- November 23 – William Moultrie, American general (d. 1805)
- December 14 – James Bruce, Scottish explorer (d. 1794)
- December 25 – Filippo Mazzei, Italian physician, friend of Thomas Jefferson (d. 1816)
- December 30 – William Hamilton, British diplomat, antiquary (d. 1803)
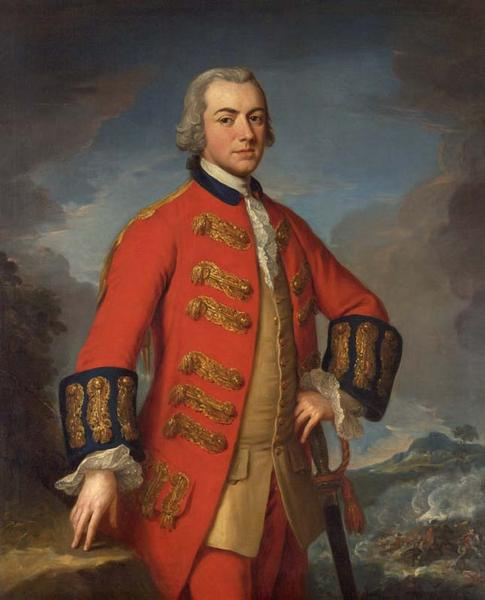
  Henry Clinton
- date unknown
  - Jacob Alyashar, Talmudist and emissary (d. c. 1790)
  - John Cook, American farmer, President of Delaware (d. 1789)
  - Anne Rossignol, African slave trader (d. 1810)
  - John Murray, 4th Earl of Dunmore, Scottish peer and colonial governor in the Americas (d. 1809)
  - White Eyes, Indigenous American (Lenape) leader (d. 1778)

1731

- January 3 – Angelo Emo, Venetian admiral and statesman (d. 1792)
- February – Charles Churchill, English poet (d. 1764)
- March 19 – Gabriela Silang, Filipino rebel leader and heroine (d. 1763)
- April 8 – William Williams, signer of the United States Declaration of Independence (d. 1811)
- May 8 – Beilby Porteus, Bishop of London and abolitionist (d. 1809)
- June 2 – Dorothea Biehl, Danish writer (d. 1788)
- July 16 – Samuel Huntington, Patriot in the American Revolution and politician (d. 1796)
- August – Henry Constantine Jennings, English gambler and collector (d. 1819)

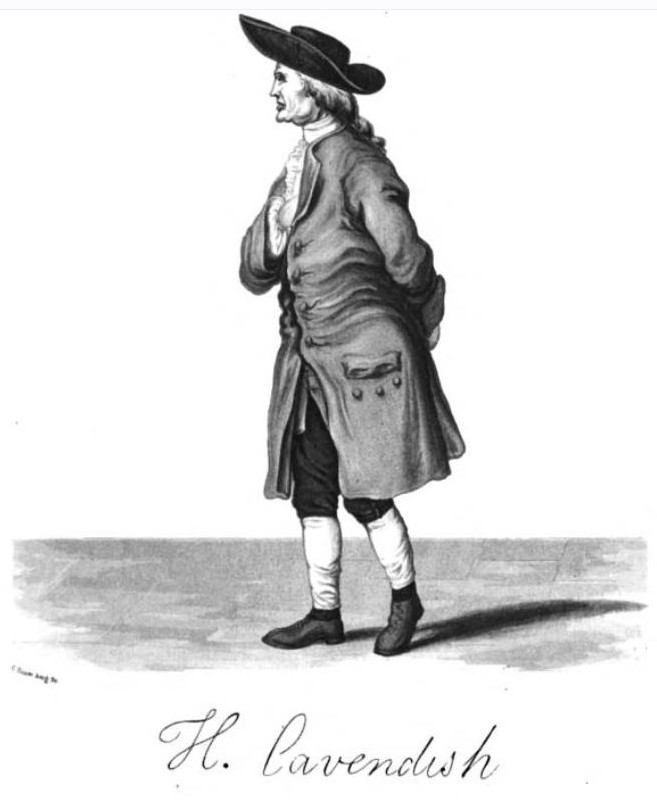
Henry Cavendish

- October 10 – Henry Cavendish, English scientist (d. 1810)
- November 9 – Benjamin Banneker, African-American astronomer, surveyor of the District of Columbia (d. 1806)
- November 15 – William Cowper, English poet (d. 1800)
- December 8 – František Xaver Dušek, Czech composer (d. 1799)
- December 12 – Erasmus Darwin, English scientist and grandfather of Charles Darwin (d. 1802)
- December 28 – José de Viera y Clavijo, Spanish writer
- Nikephoros Theotokis, Greek scholar and theologian (d. 1800)

1732

- January – Abbas III, Shah of Persia (d. 1740)
- January 17 – Stanisław August Poniatowski, last King of Poland and Grand Duke of Lithuania (d. 1798)
- January 20 – Richard Henry Lee, 12th President of the Continental Congress (d. 1794)
- January 24 – Pierre de Beaumarchais, French writer (d. 1799)
- February – Charles Churchill, English poet (d. 1764)
- February 6 – Charles Lee, general of the Continental Army (d. 1782)

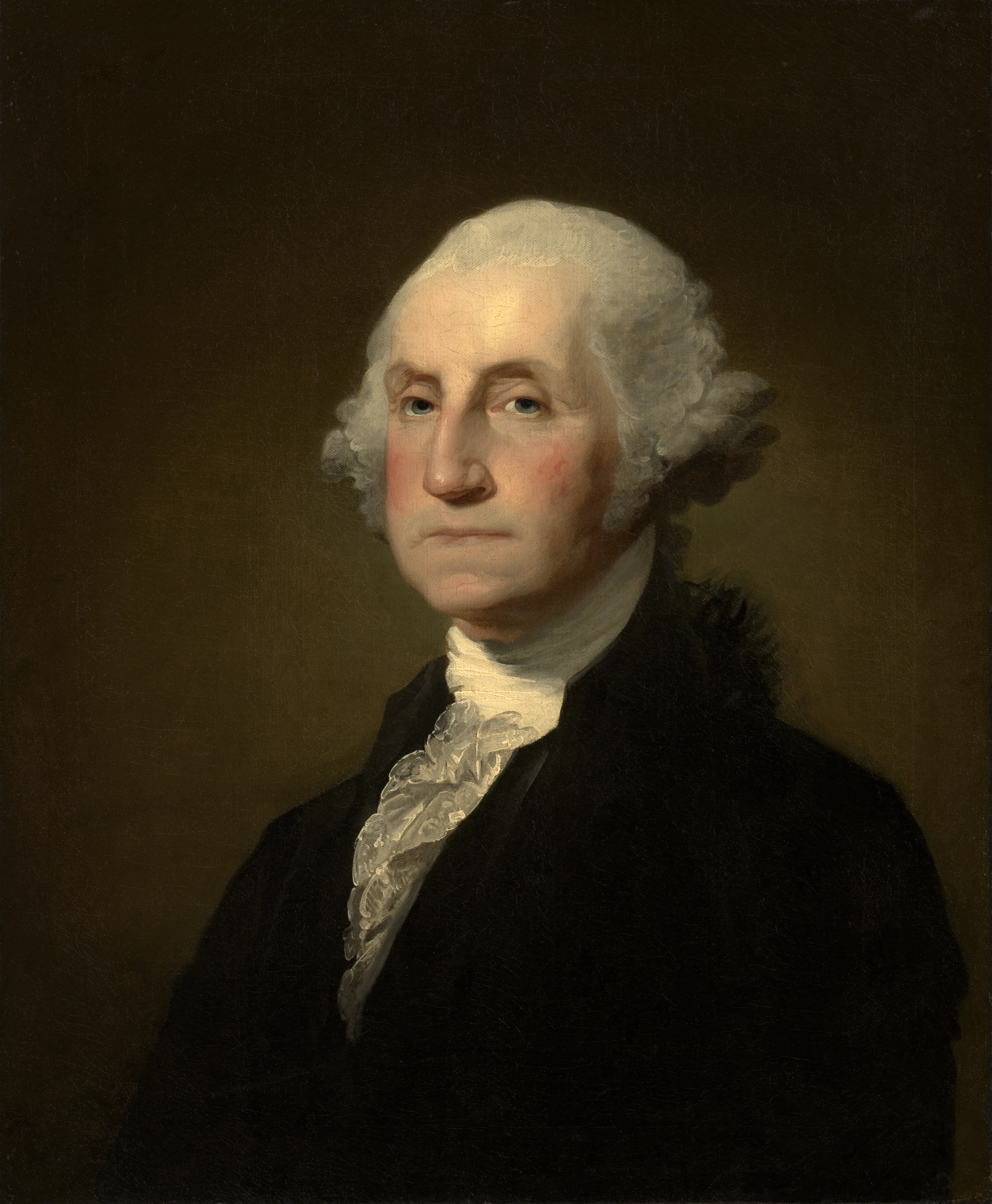
George Washington

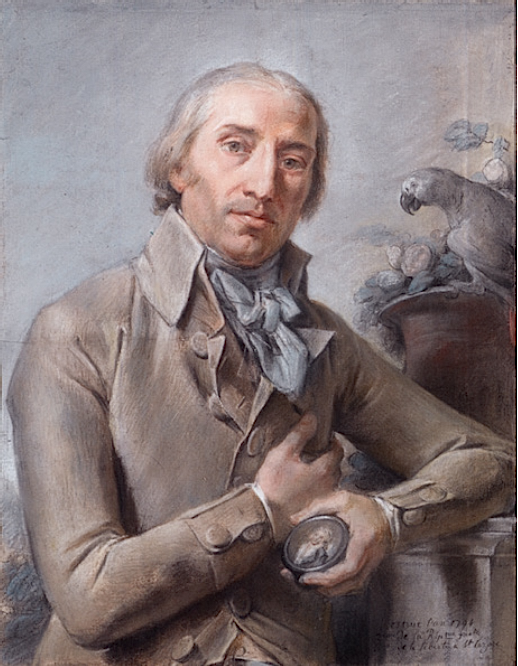
Jean-Bernard Restout

- February 22
  - George Washington, first President of the United States (d. 1799)
  - Jean-Bernard Restout, French painter (d. 1797)
- March 1 – William Cushing, Associate Justice of the Supreme Court of the United States (d. 1810)
- March 23 – Adélaïde of France, Princess of France and Duchess of Louvois (d. 1800)
- March 31 – Joseph Haydn, Austrian composer (d. 1809)
- April 5 – Jean-Honoré Fragonard, French painter (d. 1806)
- April 8 – David Rittenhouse, American astronomer, inventor, mathematician, surveyor, scientific instrument craftsman and public official (d. 1796)
- April 13 – Frederick North, Lord North, Prime Minister of Great Britain (d. 1792)
- April 17 – John Blair Jr., American politician and Associate Justice of the Supreme Court of the United States (d. 1800)
- June 21 – Johann Christoph Friedrich Bach, German composer (d. 1795)
- September 2 – William Crawford, American soldier and surveyor (d. 1782)
- September 26 – José de Córdoba y Ramos, Spanish explorer, naval commander (d. 1815)
- September 30 – Jacques Necker, French politician (d. 1804)
- October 6 – Nevil Maskelyne, English Astronomer Royal (d. 1811)
- October 10 – John Hancock, American silversmith (d. 1784)
- October 24 – Cristina Roccati, Italian scholar in physics (d. 1797)
- November 4 – Thomas Johnson, American politician and Associate Justice of the Supreme Court of the United States (d. 1819)
- November 9 – Jeanne Julie Éléonore de Lespinasse, French salon holder (d. 1776)
- November 13 – John Dickinson, Governor of Delaware and Pennsylvania (d. 1808)
- December 6 – Warren Hastings, British administrator (d. 1818)
- December 15 – Carl Gotthard Langhans, German architect (d. 1808)
- December 21 – Johann Christian Wiegleb, German chemist (d. 1800)
- December 23 – Richard Arkwright, English inventor (d. 1792)
- date unknown – Francis Marion, American officer (d. 1795)

1733

- January 22 – Philip Carteret, Jersey-born British naval officer and circumnavigator (d. 1796)
- January 24 – Benjamin Lincoln, major general in the Continental Army during the American Revolutionary War, and politician (d. 1810)

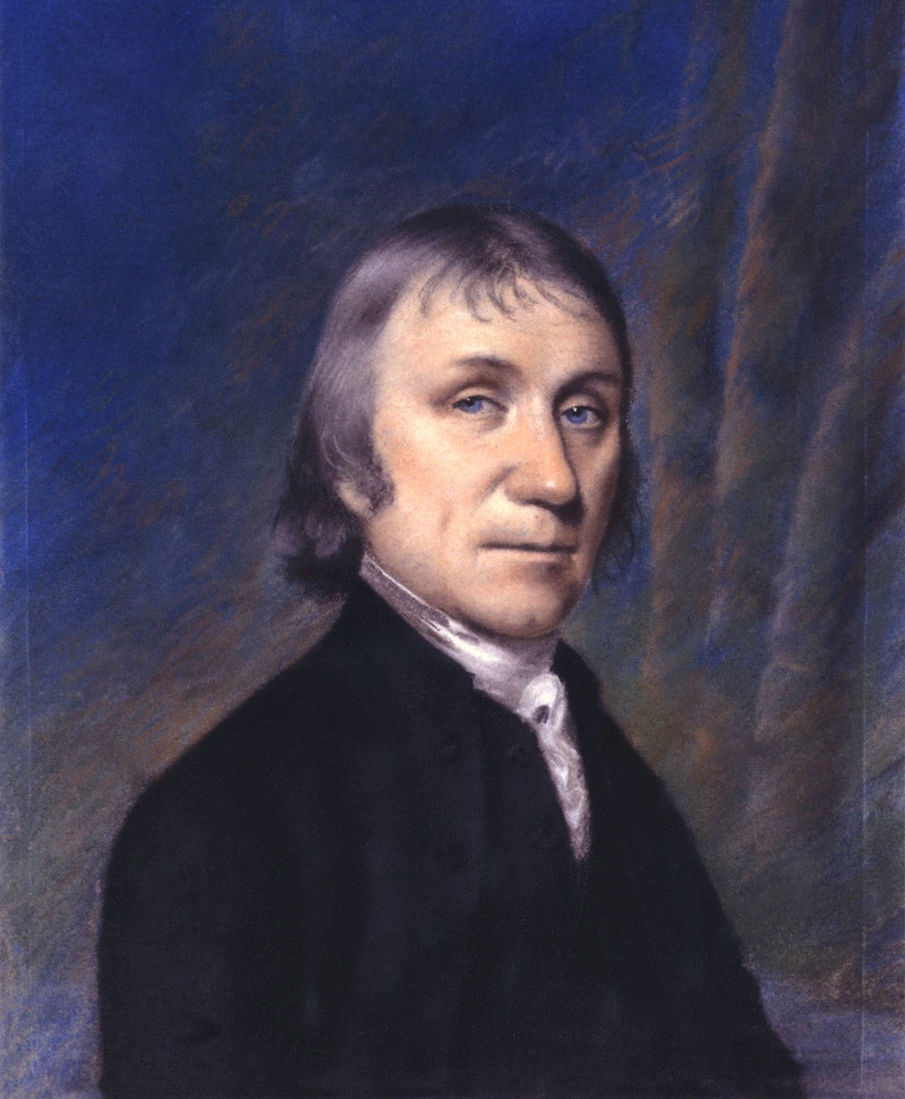
Joseph Priestley

- March 13 – Joseph Priestley, English scientist and minister (d. 1804)
- May 4 – Jean-Charles de Borda, French mathematician, physicist, political scientist, and sailor (d. 1799)
- July 27 – Jeremiah Dixon, English surveyor and astronomer (d. 1779)
- September 5 – Christoph Martin Wieland, German poet and writer (d. 1813)
- September 18 – George Read, American lawyer and signer of the Declaration of Independence (d. 1798)
- October 14 – François Sébastien Charles Joseph de Croix, Count of Clerfayt, Austrian field marshal (d. 1798)
- October 15 – Lisa Eriksdotter, Finnish visionary
- November 16 – Siraj ud-Daulah, the last independent ruler of Bengal of undivided India (d. 1757)
- November 20 – Philip Schuyler, general in the American Revolution, United States Senator from New York, father of Angelica Schuyler Church and Elizabeth Schuyler Hamilton (d. 1804)
- undated – Johanna Löfblad, Swedish actor and singer (d. 1811)

1734

- January 16 – John A. Treutlen, Governor of Georgia (d. 1782)
- January 20 – Robert Morris, Founding Father of the United States (d. 1806)
- February 15 – William Stacy, American Revolutionary War officer (d. 1802)
- February 27 – Thomas Conway, American Revolutionary War general (d. 1800)
- March 1 – Jeanne de Bellem, heroine of the Brabant Revolution
- March 19 – Thomas McKean, American lawyer, signer of the Declaration of Independence (d. 1817)
- April 17 – Taksin, King of Thailand (d. 1782)
- April – Elsa Beata Bunge, Swedish botanist (d. 1819)
- May 23 – Franz Mesmer, Austrian physician (d. 1815)
- July 25 – Ueda Akinari, Japanese author and scholar (d. 1809)
- August 10 – Naungdawgyi, Burmese king (d. 1763)
- August 24 – Benjamin Church, first Surgeon General of the United States Army (d. 1763)
- September 3 – Joseph Wright, British painter (d. 1797)
- September 17 – Elizabeth Canning, English maidservant and kidnappee (d. 1773)
- October 7 – Sir Ralph Abercromby, British general (d. 1801)

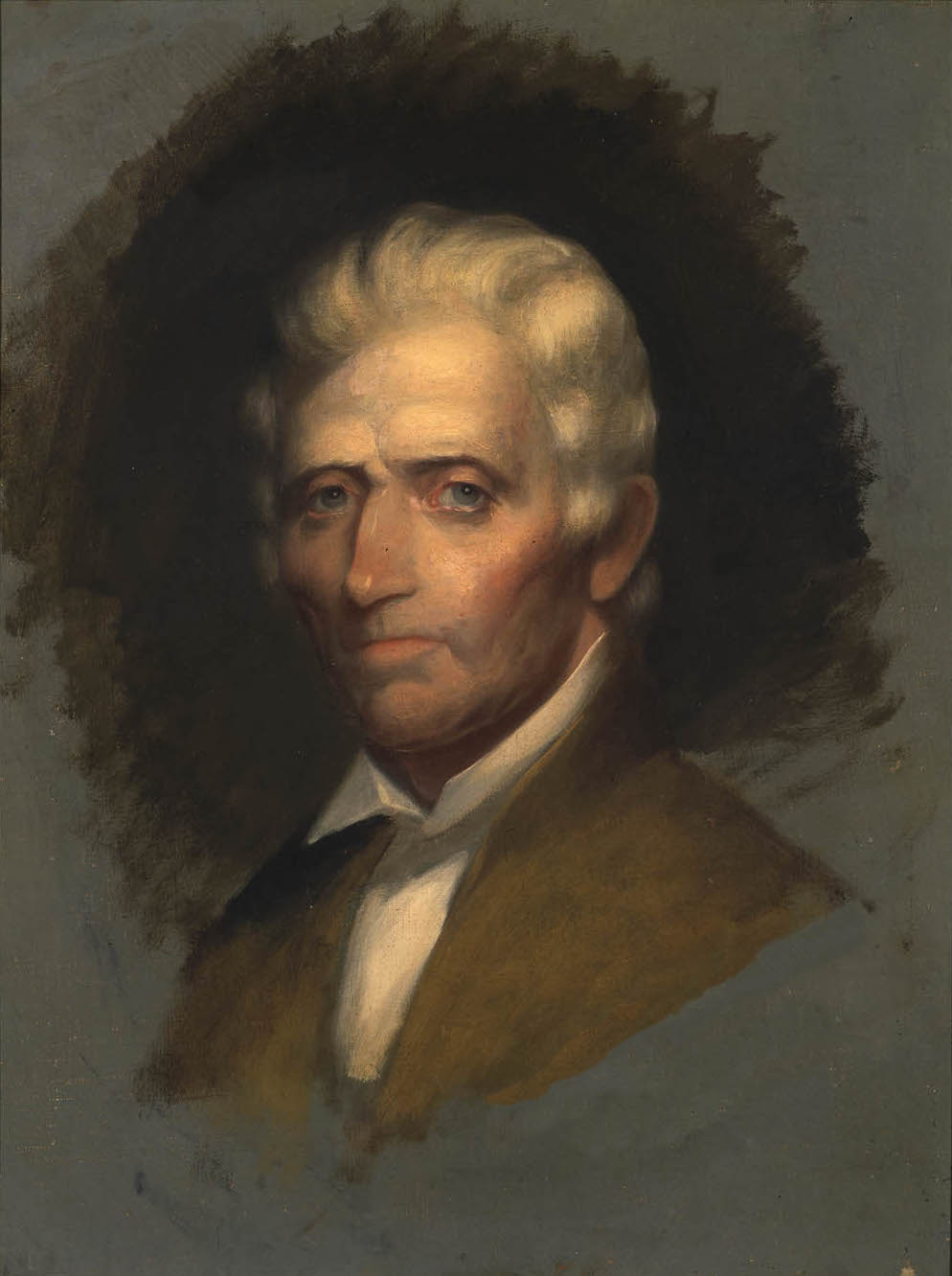
Daniel Boone

- November 2 – Daniel Boone, American frontiersman (d. 1820)
- December 1 – Adam Kazimierz Czartoryski, Polish aristocrat and patron of the arts (d. 1823)
- December 17 – Queen Maria I of Portugal (d. 1816)
- December 21 – Paul Revere, American silversmith, engraver, and Patriot in the American Revolution (d. 1818)
- December 26 – George Romney, English painter (d. 1802)
- December 31 – Francisco Manoel de Nascimento, Portuguese poet (d. 1819)
- date unknown
  - Catharina Ahlgren, Swedish poet, editor and early feminist (d.1800)
  - Ulrica Arfvidsson, Swedish fortune teller (d. 1801)
  - Elżbieta Branicka, Polish szlachta and politician (d. 1800)
  - John Dawson, English mathematician and surgeon (d.1820)
  - Pedro Fages, Spanish soldier, explorer, and Governor of Alta California (d. 1794)
  - Rohal Faqir, Pakistani saint-poet and mystic (d.1804)

1735

- January 1 – Paul Revere, American silversmith and patriot (d. 1818)
- January 8 – John Carroll first Roman Catholic Archbishop in the U.S. (d. 1815)
- January 9 – John Jervis, 1st Earl of St Vincent, British Royal Navy admiral (d. 1823)
- January 27 – Étienne Clavière, French financier and politician (d. 1793)
- February 13 – Crown Prince Sado of Joseon (d. 1762)
- February 28 – Alexandre-Théophile Vandermonde French musician and chemist (d. 1796)
- March 1 – Caroline Thielo, Danish actress (d. 1754)
- March 29 – Johann Karl August Musäus German author (d. 1787)
- April 13 – Isaac Low, New York delegate to the Continental Congress (d. 1791)
- May 1 – Lorenzo Hervás y Panduro Spanish Jesuit philologist (d. 1809)
- May 23 – Charles Joseph, Prince de Ligne, (d. 1814)
- June 16 – Nicolas Bernard Lépicié, French painter (d. 1784)
- June 26 – Joseph Ducreux, French noble, portrait painter, pastelist, miniaturist and engraver (d. 1802)
- July 4 – Jacoba van den Brande, Dutch culture personality (d. 1794)
- July 10 – Ulrika Pasch, Swedish painter (d. 1796)
- September 5 – Johann Christian Bach, German composer (d. 1782)
- September 6 – John Joseph Merlin, born Jean-Joseph Merlin, Liège-born clock- and musical-instrument-maker and inventor (d. 1803)
- September 20 – James Keir, Scottish geologist, chemist and industrialist (d. 1820)
- September 28 – Augustus FitzRoy, 3rd Duke of Grafton, Prime Minister of the United Kingdom (d. 1811)
- October 9 – Karl Wilhelm Ferdinand, Duke of Brunswick (d. 1806)
- October 21 – Richard Gough, English antiquary (d. 1809)

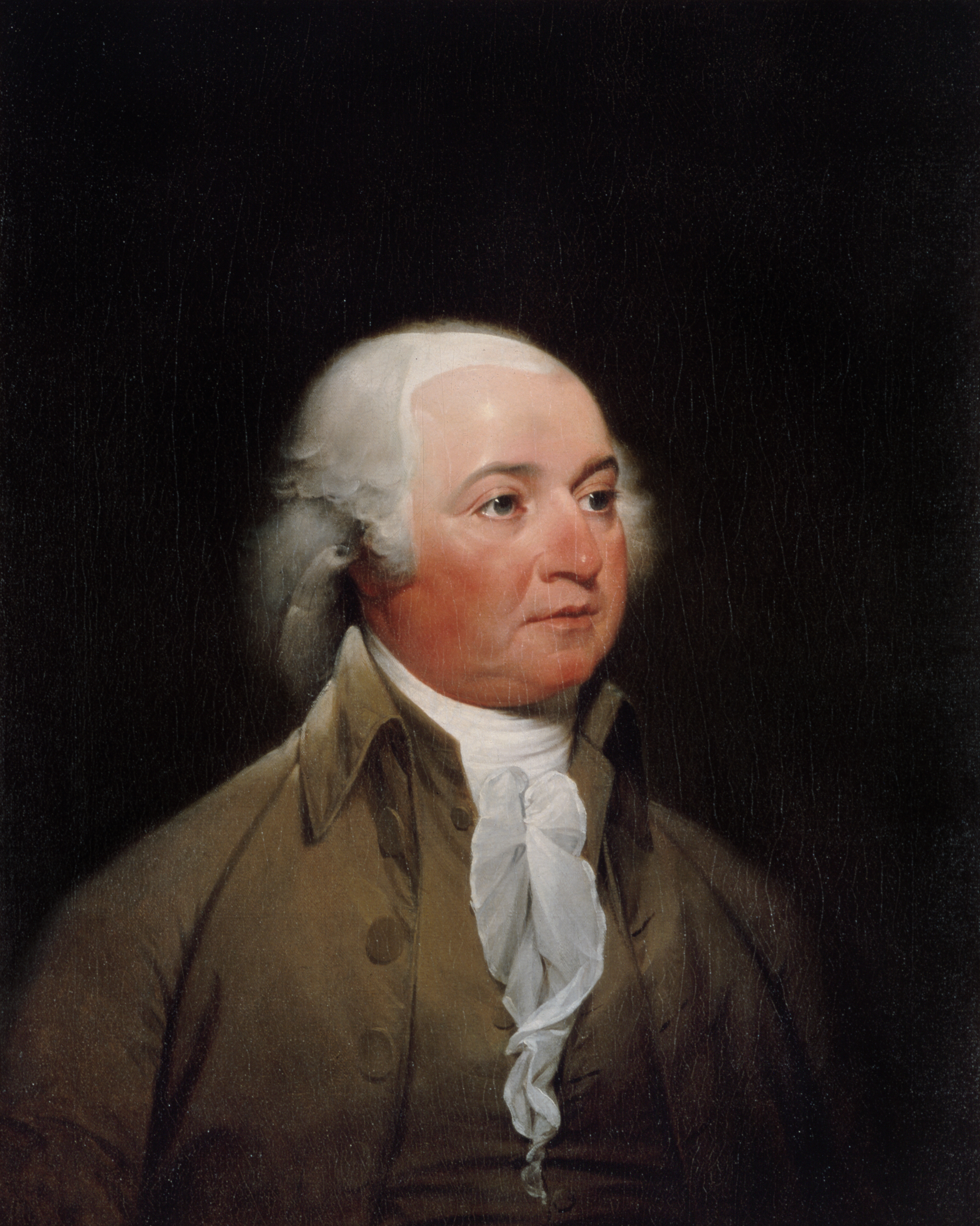
John Adams

- October 30 – John Adams, second President of the United States (d. 1826)
- November 10 – Granville Sharp, English abolitionist (d. 1813)
- December 29 – Thomas Banks, English sculptor and artist (d. 1805)
- December 31 – Jean de Crévecoeur, French-American writer (d. 1813)
- date unknown
  - John Julius Angerstein, Russian-born English merchant, insurer and art collector (d. 1823)
  - William Bell, English portrait painter from Newcastle upon Tyne (d. c. 1806)
  - Bety of Betsimisaraka, queen regnant (d. 1805)
  - Mary Evans, Welsh religious leader (d. 1789)
  - Edward Telfair, Scottish-born American politician and Governor of Georgia (d. 1807)
  - Regina-Louise von Freedricksz, Russian industrialist (d. 1821)

1736

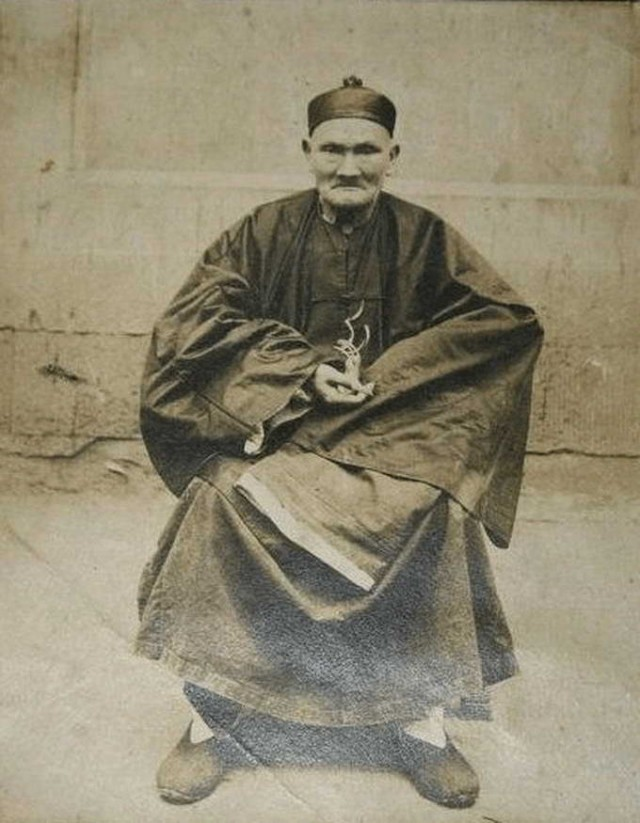
Li Ching-Yuen

- January 7 – Andrew Adams, American judge (d. 1797)

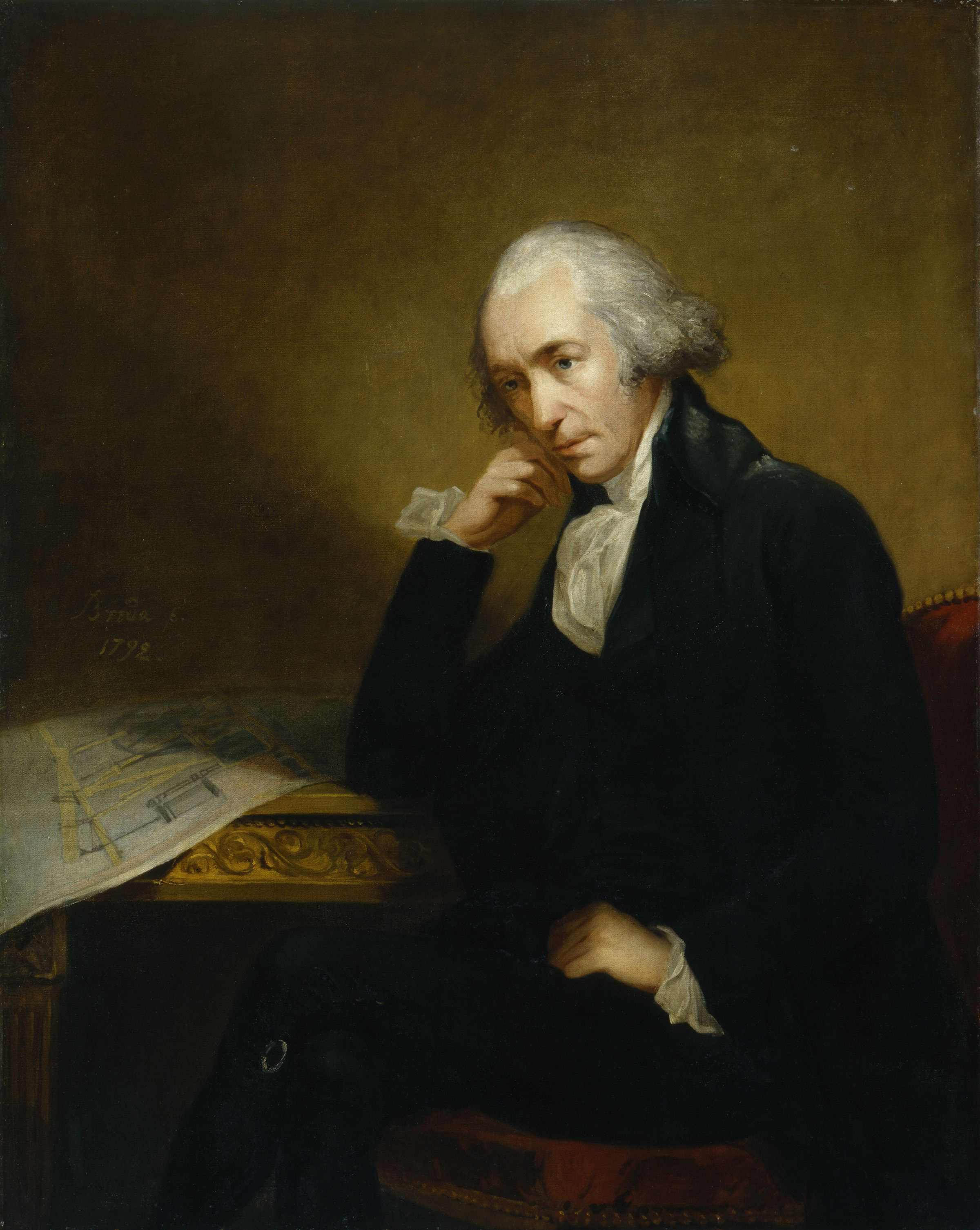
James Watt

- January 19 – James Watt, Scottish inventor (d. 1819)
- January 25 – Joseph-Louis Lagrange, Italian-born mathematician (d. 1813)
- February 3 – Johann Georg Albrechtsberger, Austrian musician (d. 1809)
- February 29 – Ann Lee, English-born American religious leader (d. 1784)
- March 20 – Rama I, First King of Siam (d. 1809)
- May 8 – Caterina Dolfin, Italian (Venetian) poet (d. 1793)
- May 10 – George Steevens, English literary critic (d. 1800)
- May 29 – Patrick Henry, American patriot (d. 1799)
- June 3 – Sir John Acton, 6th Baronet, Prime Minister of Naples (d. 1811)
- June 7 – Fermín Lasuén, Spanish missionary (d. 1803)

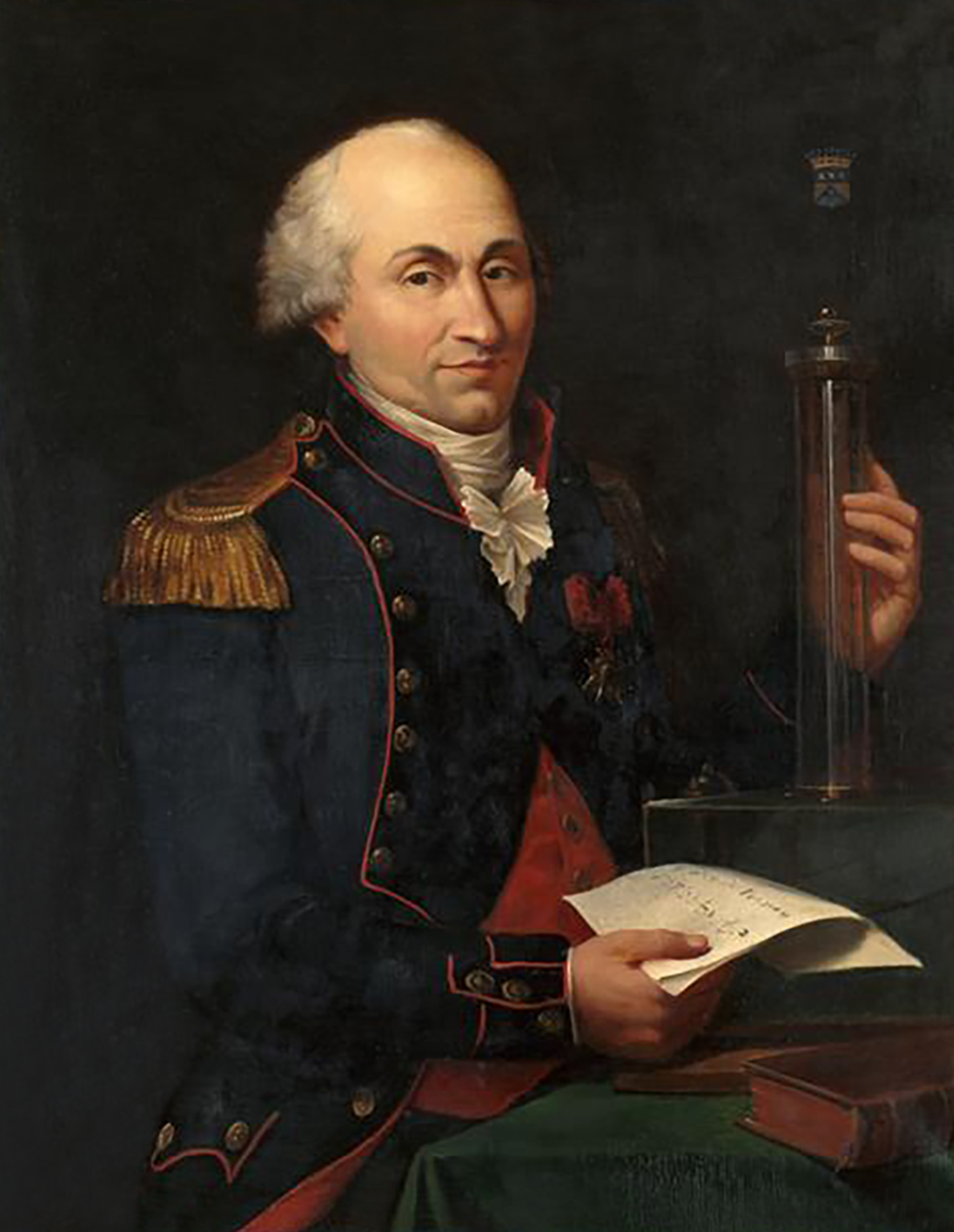
Charles-Augustin de Coulomb

- June 14 – Charles-Augustin de Coulomb, French physicist (d. 1806)
- June 21 – Enoch Poor, American general (d. 1780)
- June 25 – John Horne Tooke, English politician, philologist (d. 1812)
- July – Juan Bautista de Anza, Governor of the Spanish Province of New Mexico (d. 1788)
- August 9 – Louis Joseph, Prince of Condé (d. 1818)
- August 15 – Alexander Runciman, Scottish painter (d. 1785)
- August 26 – Jean-Baptiste L. Romé de l'Isle, French geologist (d. 1790)
- September 15 – Jean Sylvain Bailly, French astronomer (d. 1793)
- September 16 – Carter Braxton, signer of the American Declaration of Independence (d. 1797)
- October 27 – James Macpherson, Scottish poet (d. 1796)
- date unknown
  - Robert Jephson, Irish dramatist (d. 1803)
  - Li Ching-Yuen, Chinese herbalist, martial artist and tactical advisor (d.1933) (claimed)
  - Pierre le Pelley I, Seigneur of Sark (d. 1778)
  - Claudius Smith, American revolutionary (d. 1779)
  - Sir James Tylney-Long, 7th Baronet, English politician (d. 1794)

1737

- January 4 – Louis-Bernard Guyton de Morveau, French chemist, politician (d. 1816)
- January 23 – John Hancock, American politician and revolutionary (d. 1793)

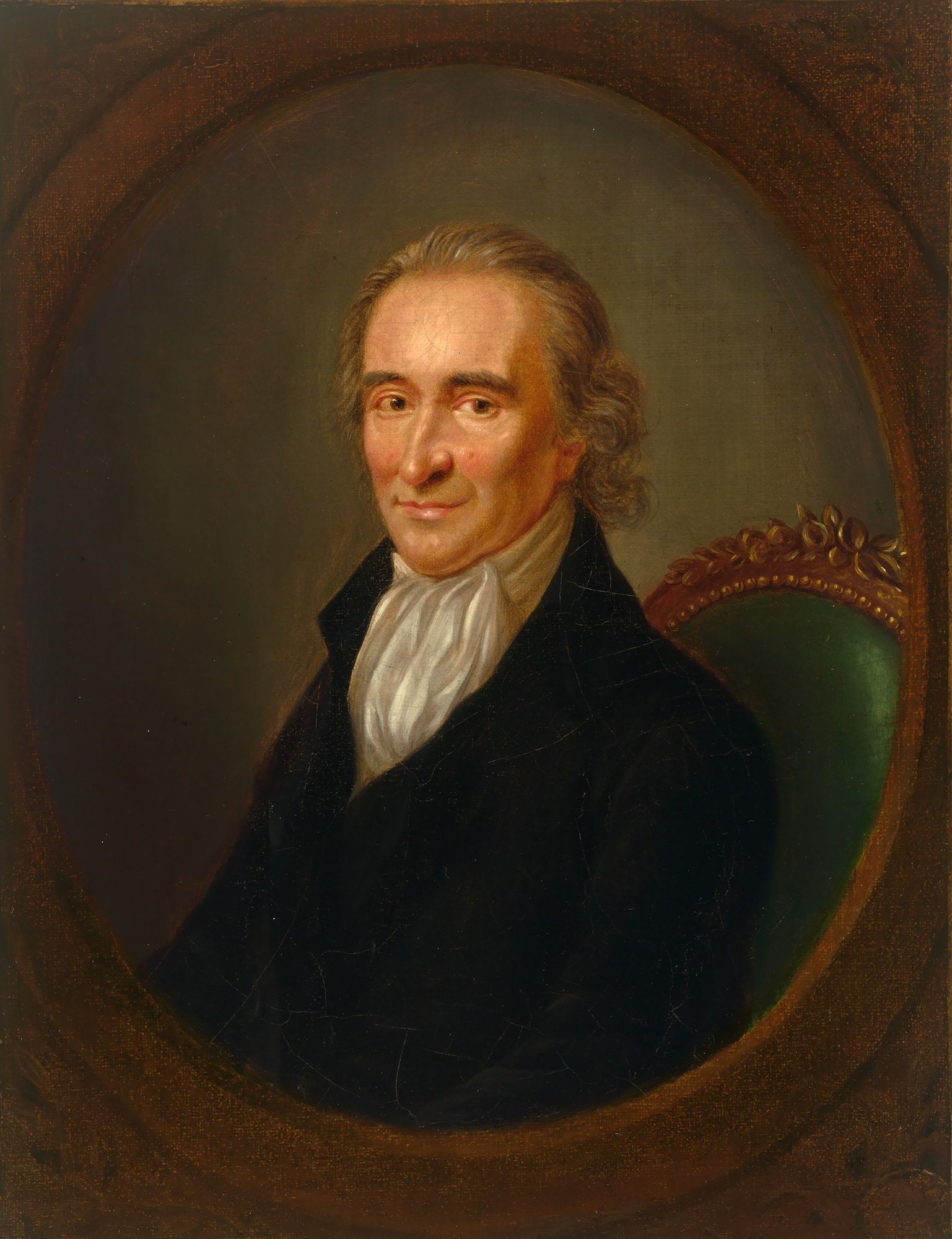
Thomas Paine

- January 29 – Thomas Paine, British-born American patriot and pamphleteer (d. 1809)
- March 14 – Ioan Nicolidi of Pindus, Aromanian physician and noble (d. 1828)
- March 23 – Arthur St. Clair, American soldier and politician (d. 1818)
- April 27 – Edward Gibbon, English historian and politician (d. 1794)
- May 2 – William Petty, 2nd Earl of Shelburne, Prime Minister of Great Britain (d. 1805)
- June 20 – Tokugawa Ieharu, Japanese shōgun (d. 1786)
- August 5 – Johann Friedrich Struensee, Danish royal physician (d. 1772)
- August 14 – Charles Hutton, English mathematician (d. 1823)
- August 29 – John Hunter, second governor of New South Wales (d. 1821)
- September 9 – Luigi Galvani, Italian physician and physicist (d. 1798)
- September 14 – Michael Haydn, Austrian composer (d. 1806)
- September 15 – Miklós Küzmics, Hungarian Slovenes writer, Catholic priest (d. 1804)
- September 19 – Charles Carroll of Carrollton, only Roman Catholic signer of the American Declaration of Independence (d. 1832)
- December 26 – Prince Josias of Coburg, Austrian general (d. 1815)
- date unknown –
  - Frances Abington, English actress (d. 1815)
  - Gelelemend, Indigenous American (Lenape) leader (d. 1811)

1738

- January 21 – Ethan Allen, American patriot (d. 1789)
- February 6 – Pierre-Joseph Desault, French anatomist and surgeon (d. 1795)
- April 12 – Padre Francisco Garcés, Spanish missionary (d. 1781)
- April 14 – William Cavendish-Bentinck, 3rd Duke of Portland, Prime Minister of the United Kingdom (d. 1809)
- May 27 – Nathaniel Gorham, American politician (d. 1796)
- May 28 – Joseph-Ignace Guillotin, French physician (d. 1814)
- June 4 – King George III of the United Kingdom (d. 1820)
- July 3 – John Singleton Copley, American painter (d. 1815)
- July 20 – Darejan Dadiani, Georgian queen consort (d. 1807)
- July 22 – Anne d'Yves, writer, participant in the Brabant Revolution (d. 1814)
- August 28 – Etteilla, French occult cartomancer (d. 1791)
- September 25 – Nicholas Van Dyke, American lawyer and President of Delaware (d. 1789)
- October 11 – Arthur Phillip, British admiral and Governor of New South Wales (d. 1814)
- October 18 – Andrei Bolotov, Russian agriculturalist and memoirist (d. 1833)
- October 29 – Charles Spalding, Scottish inventor and underwater diver (d. 1783)

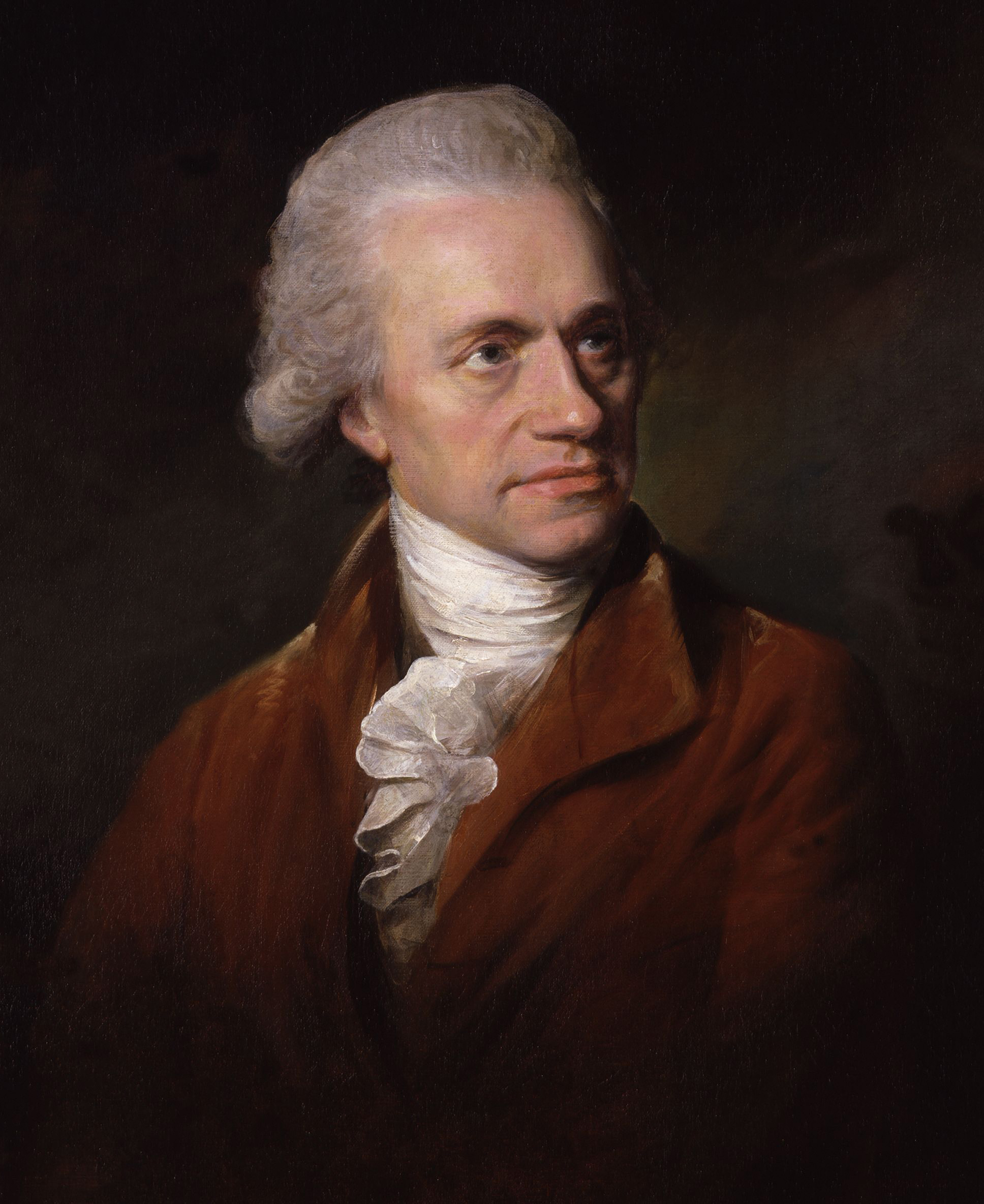
William Herschel

- November 15 – William Herschel, German-born astronomer (d. 1822)
- December 31 – Charles Cornwallis, 1st Marquess Cornwallis, British general (d. 1805)

1739

- January 25 – Charles François Dumouriez, French general (d. 1823)
- February 15 – Alexandre-Théodore Brongniart, French architect (d. 1813)
- March 16 – George Clymer, American politician and Founding Father (d. 1813)
- March 19 – Charles-François Lebrun, duc de Plaisance, Third Consul of France (d. 1824)
- August 31 – Johann Augustus Eberhard, German theologian, philosopher (d. 1809)
- September 12 – Mary Bosanquet Fletcher, Methodist preacher and philanthropist (d. 1816)
- October 11 – Grigory Potemkin, Russian military leader, statesman, nobleman and favourite of Catherine the Great (d. 1791)
- November 2 – Carl Ditters von Dittersdorf, Austrian composer (d. 1799)
- November 8 – Henrik Gabriel Porthan, Finnish professor and historian (d. 1804)
- November 20 – Jean-François de La Harpe, French critic (d. 1803)
- December 14 – Pierre Samuel du Pont de Nemours, French politician (d. 1817)
- date unknown
  - Antonio Cachia, Maltese architect, engineer and archaeologist (d. 1813)
  - Bénédict Chastanier, French surgeon (d. 1816)
  - Margherita Dalmet, Venetian dogaressa (d. 1817)
  - Paul François Ignace de Barlatier de Mas, French naval captain (d. 1807)
  - Samuel Mason, Revolutionary War soldier, early American outlaw (d. 1803)
  - Karoline Kaulla, German banker (d. 1809)
  - Yelizaveta Belogradskaya, Russian singer and musician

== Deaths ==
1730

- January 1
  - Daniel Finch, 2nd Earl of Nottingham, English politician (b. 1647)
  - Samuel Sewall, English-born judge (b. 1652)
- January 7 – Árni Magnússon, Icelandic scholar and manuscript collector (b. 1663)
- January 18 – Antonio Vallisneri, Italian scientist (b. 1661)
- January 30 – Emperor Peter II of Russia (b. 1715)
- February 9 – Johann Georg von Eckhart, German historian (b. 1664)
- February 12 – Luca Carlevarijs, Italian painter (b. 1663)
- February 21 – Pope Benedict XIII, Italian pontiff (b. 1649)
- March 20 – Adrienne Lecouvreur, French actress (b. 1692)
- March 22 – Benedetto Pamphili, Italian cardinal, patron of the arts, composer and librettist (b. 1653)
- March 23 – Charles I, Landgrave of Hesse-Kassel (or Hesse-Cassel) (b. 1654)
- May 13 – Sir Justinian Isham, 4th Baronet, English landowner and Member of Parliament (b. 1658)
- May 30 – Arabella Churchill, English mistress of James II of England (b. 1648)
- June 6 – Alain Emmanuel de Coëtlogon, Marshal of France in the reign of Louis XIV and Louis XV (b. 1646)
- June 18 – Yinxiang, Qing dynasty prince (b. 1686)
- June 19 – Thomas Trevor, 1st Baron Trevor, English judge and politician (b. 1658)
- June 21 – Sarah Basset, Bermudian slave, origin of legend
- June 28 – Joachim Bouvet, French Jesuit active in China (b. 1656)
- July 7 – Olivier Levasseur, French pirate
- July 9 – Issachar Berend Lehmann, German-Jewish banker, Court Jew in Hanover (b. 1661)
- July 18 – François de Neufville, duc de Villeroy, French soldier (b. 1644)
- August 10 – Sébastien de Brossard, French composer and music theorist (b. 1655)
- August 12 – Benedicta Henrietta of the Palatinate, German princess (b. 1652)
- August 19 – James Ogilvy, 4th Earl of Findlater, Scottish politician (b. 1664)
- September 9 – Charles FitzRoy, 2nd Duke of Cleveland, English courtier (b. 1662)
- September 10 – Guichard Joseph Duverney, French anatomist (b. 1648)
- September 14 – Sophia Elisabet Brenner, Swedish writer (b. 1659)
- September 27 – Laurence Eusden, English poet (b. 1688)

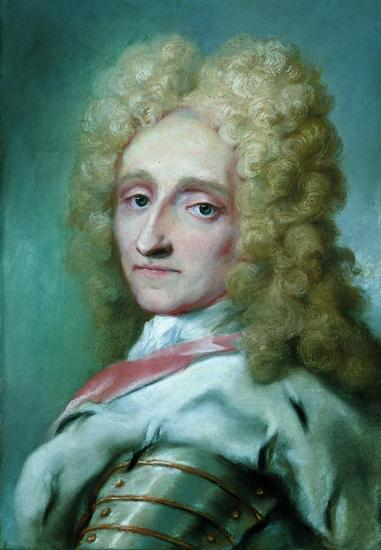
Frederick IV

- October 12 – Frederick IV, King of Denmark and Norway (b. 1671)
- October 16 – Antoine de la Mothe Cadillac, French explorer (b. 1658)
- October 23 – Anne Oldfield, English actress (b. 1683)
- November 1 – Luigi Ferdinando Marsili, Italian soldier and naturalist (b. 1658)
- November 21 – François de Troy, French portrait artist (b. 1645)
- December 31 – Carlo Gimach, Maltese architect, engineer and poet (b. 1651)

1731

- January 6 – Étienne François Geoffroy, French chemist (b. 1672)
- January 20 – Antonio Farnese, Duke of Parma (b. 1679)
- January 23 – Anna Lohe, Swedish banker (b. 1654)

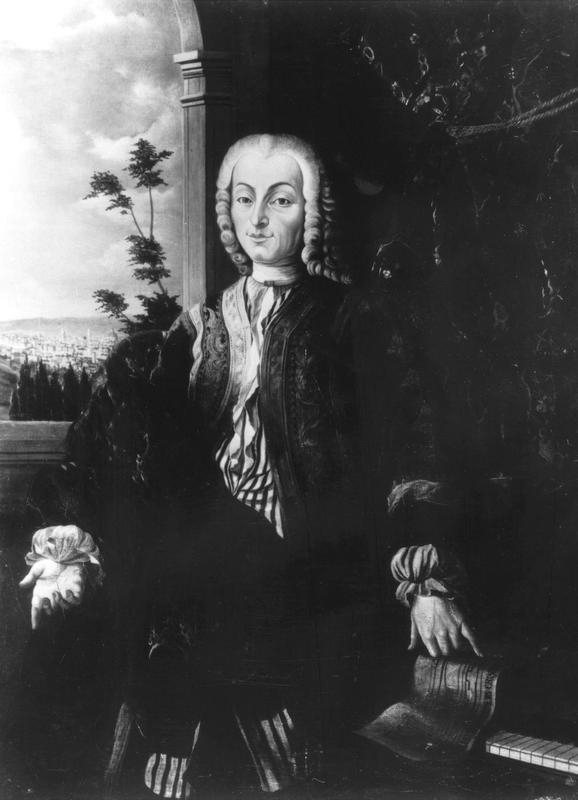
Bartolomeo Cristofori

- January 27 – Bartolomeo Cristofori, Italian maker of musical instruments (b. 1655)
- February – Thomas Hancorne, Welsh clergyman and theologian (b. 1642)
- February 10 – George Carpenter, 1st Baron Carpenter, British Army general (b. 1657)
- February 15 – Mary of Jesus de León y Delgado, Spanish Dominican lay sister and mystic (b. 1643)
- February 22 – Frederik Ruysch, Dutch physician and anatomist (b. 1638)
- March 5 – Abd al-Ghani al-Nabulsi, Sufi academic (b. 1641)
- March 6 – Johann Melchior Dinglinger, German goldsmith (b. 1664)
- March 8 – Ferdinand Brokoff, Czech sculptor (b. 1688)
- March 9 – Frances Talbot, Countess of Tyrconnell, English-born courtier and vicereine of Ireland (b. c. 1649)
- March 12 – Ernest August, Duke of Schleswig-Holstein-Sonderburg-Augustenburg (b. 1660)
- March 23 – Augustus William, Duke of Brunswick-Lüneburg (b. 1662)
- April 24 – Daniel Defoe, English writer (b. c. 1660)
- April 28
  - Johann Theodor Jablonski, German lexicographer (b. 1654)
  - James Olmsted, Connecticut politician (b. 1645)
- May 1 – Johann Ludwig Bach, German composer (b. 1677)
- May 11 – Mary Astell, English feminist writer (b. 1666)
- May 17 – Samuel Bradford, English churchman, Whig politician (b. 1652)
- June 20 – Ned Ward, English writer, publican (b. 1667)
- July 18 – Sir Walter Yonge, 3rd Baronet, English politician (b. 1653)
- August 27 – Eudoxia Lopukhina, Russian Tsarina, divorced spouse of Peter the Great of Russia (b. 1669)
- December 17 – George Lockhart, Scottish writer, spy and politician, killed in duel (b. 1673)
- December 20 – Chhatrasal, Maharaja of Madhya Pradesh (b. 1649)
- December 26 – Antoine Houdar de la Motte, French writer (b. 1672)
- December 29 – Brook Taylor, English mathematician (b. 1685)

1732

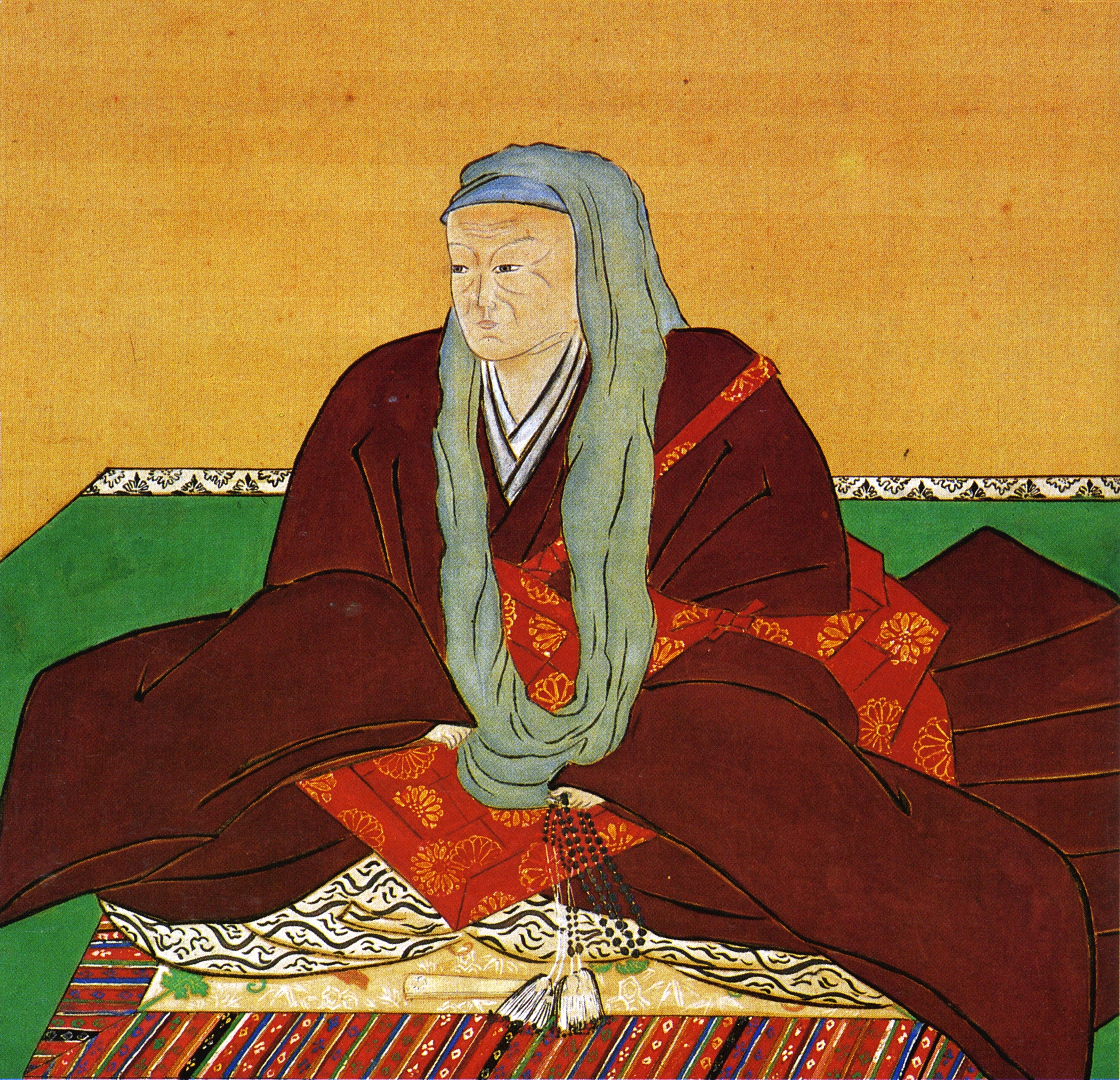
Emperor Reigen

- January 12 – John Horsley, British archaeologist (b. c.1685)
- January 14 – Richard Hancorne, Welsh clergyman (b. 1687)
- January 22 – Louis de Sabran, British theologian (b. 1652)
- February 6 – Anne Scott, 1st Duchess of Buccleuch, wealthy Scottish peeress (b. 1651)
- February 7 – William Hiseland, English (later British) soldier, reputed supercentenarian (b. 1620)
- February 13 – Charles-René d'Hozier, French historian (b. 1640)
- February 17 – Louis Marchand, French organist and harpsichordist (b. 1669)
- February 18 – Balthasar Permoser, German sculptor (b. 1651)
- February 22
  - Francis Atterbury, English bishop and man of letters (b. 1663)
  - Marie Thérèse de Bourbon, Princess of Conti and titular queen of Poland (b. 1666)
- February 27 – Giacomo Serpotta, Italian artist (b. 1652)
- February 28 – André Charles Boulle, French cabinet-maker (b. 1642)
- March 20 – Johann Ernst Hanxleden, German philologist (b. 1681)
- April 6 – Count Palatine Francis Louis of Neuburg, Hochmeister of the Teutonic Order (b. 1664)
- April 28 – Thomas Parker, 1st Earl of Macclesfield (b. 1666)
- May 20 – Thomas Boston, Scottish church leader (b. 1676)
- May 30 – John King, English churchman (b. 1652)
- July 11 – Theodore Eustace, Count Palatine of Sulzbach (b. 1659)
- July 15 – Woodes Rogers, English privateer and first Royal Governor of the Bahamas (b. c. 1679)
- September 24 – Emperor Reigen of Japan (b. 1654)
- October 6 – George Duckett (Calne MP), English politician (b. 1684)
- October 12 – Dionisia de Santa María Mitas Talangpaz, Filipino saint (b. 1691)
- October 25 – Andrea Brustolon, Italian artist (b. 1662)
- October 31 – Victor Amadeus II of Sardinia (b. 1666)
- November 10 – Adam Christian Thebesius, German anatomist (b. 1686)
- November 20 – Daniel d'Auger de Subercase, French naval officer, governor of Newfoundland (b. 1661)
- November 21 – Jan Jansen Bleecker, Mayor of Albany, New York (b. 1641)
- November 26 – Charles Sergison, English politician (b. 1655)
- December 4 – John Gay, English poet and dramatist (b. 1685)
- December 14 – Johann Philipp Förtsch, German opera composer (b. 1652)
- date unknown
  - Jiang Tingxi, Chinese painter, calligrapher, encyclopedist, foreign diplomat to Japan (b. 1669)
  - Agrippina Petrovna Volkonskaia, politically active Russian lady-in-waiting

1733

- January 17 – George Byng, 1st Viscount Torrington, English Royal Navy admiral (b. 1663)
- January 21 – Bernard Mandeville, Dutch-born English economic philosopher (b. 1670)
- January 22 – Lovisa von Burghausen, Swedish memoirist (b. 1698)
- January 25 – Gilbert Heathcote, Mayor of London (b. 1652)
- January 27 – Thomas Woolston, English theologian (b. 1668)

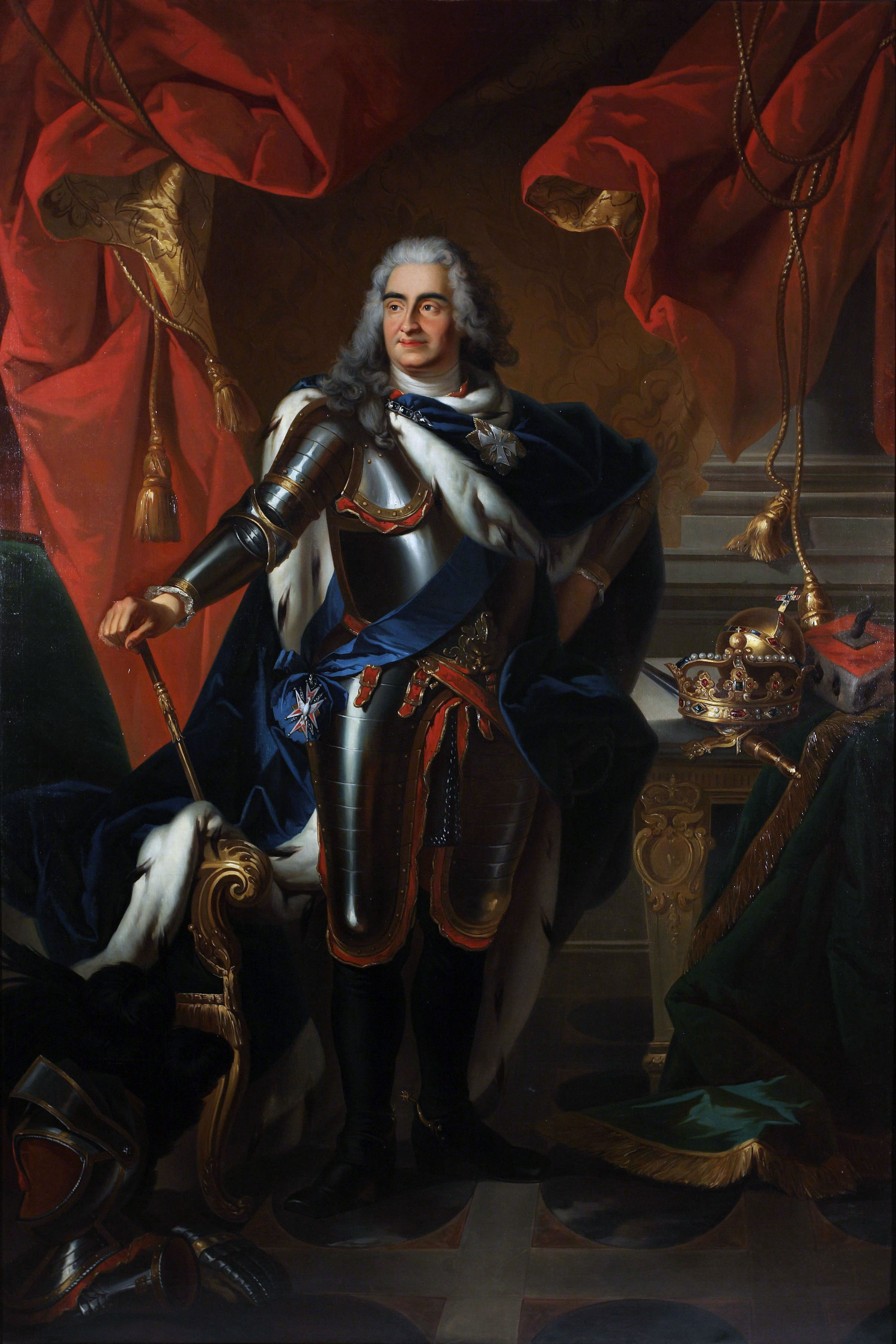
Augustus II the Strong

- February 1 – King Augustus II the Strong of Poland (b. 1670)
- February 2 – Robert Price (judge), British judge and politician (b. 1653)
- February 16 – Ulrika Eleonora Stålhammar, Swedish officer (b. 1683)
- March 4 – Claude de Forbin, French naval commander (b. 1656)
- April 14 – Ippolito Desideri, Italian tibetologist (b. 1684)
- April 19 – Elizabeth Hamilton, Countess of Orkney, mistress of William III of England (b. 1657)
- April 30 – Rodrigo Anes de Sá Almeida e Meneses, 1st Marquis of Abrantes, Portuguese diplomat (b. 1676)
- May 1 – Nicolas Coustou, French artist (b. 1658)
- May 3 – Sir Richard Cox, 1st Baronet, England (b. 1650)
- May 10 – Barton Booth, English actor (b. 1681)
- May 18 – Georg Böhm, German organist (b. 1661)
- June 23 – Johann Jakob Scheuchzer, Swiss scholar (b. 1672)
- July 12 – Anne-Thérèse de Marguenat de Courcelles, French salon holder (b. 1647)
- August 16 – Matthew Tindal, English deist (b. 1657)
- August 24 – Pierre-Étienne Monnot, French artist (b. 1657)
- September 12 – François Couperin, French composer (b. 1668)
- October 19 – Sir Thomas Molyneux, 1st Baronet, Irish politician (b. 1661)
- October 25 – Giovanni Girolamo Saccheri, Italian mathematician (b. 1667)
- October 31 – Eberhard Louis, Duke of Württemberg, (b. 1676)
- November 11 – Willem Adriaan van der Stel, Dutch colonial administrator (b. 1664)
- December 2 – Gerard Hoet, Dutch painter (b. 1648)

1734

- January 6 – John Dennis, English dramatist, critic (b. 1658)
- February 1 – John Floyer, English physician, writer (b. 1649)
- February 2 – Charles Calvert, Maryland official (b. 1688)
- February 9 – Diego de Astorga y Céspedes, Spanish Catholic cardinal (b. 1663)
- March 1 – Roger North, English biographer (b. 1653)
- March 16 – Andreas Silbermann, German organ builder (b. 1678)
- March 21 – Robert Wodrow, Scottish historian (b. 1679)
- April 1 – Louis Lully, French composer (b. 1664)
- April 11 – Thomas Fantet de Lagny, French mathematician (b. 1660)
- April 25 – Johann Konrad Dippel, German alchemist (b. 1673)
- May 4 – James Thornhill, English painter (b. 1675 or 1676)
- May 15 – Sebastiano Ricci, Italian painter (b. 1659)
- May 21 – Philippine Élisabeth d'Orléans, French princess (b. 1714)
- May 24 – Georg Ernst Stahl, German physician and chemist (b. 1660)

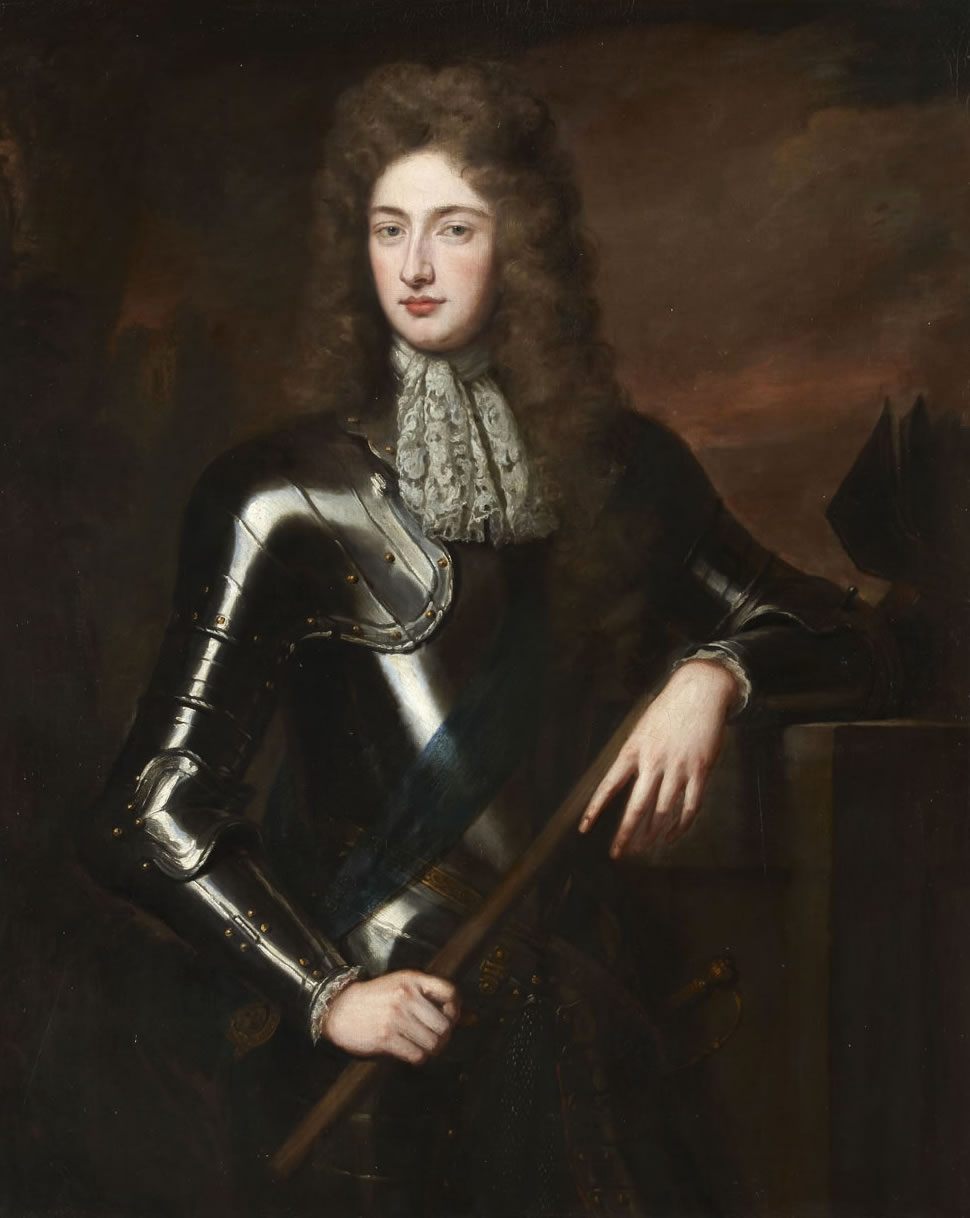
James FitzJames, 1st Duke of Berwick

- June 12 – James FitzJames, 1st Duke of Berwick, illegitimate son of James II of England and French military commander (b. 1670)
- June 15 – Giovanni Ceva, Italian mathematician (b. 1647)
- June 17 – Claude Louis Hector de Villars, Marshal of France (b. 1653)
- June 21 – Marie-Joseph Angélique, African slave
- July 22 – Peter King, 1st Baron King, Lord Chancellor of England (b. c. 1669)
- September 8 – Michel Sarrazin, Canadian scientist (b. 1659)
- October 12 – Simon Henry Adolph, Count of Lippe-Detmold, ruler of the county of Lippe (b. 1694)
- November 14 – Louise de Kérouaille, Duchess of Portsmouth, French-born mistress of Charles II of England (b. 1649)
- November 21 – Alexis Simon Belle, French portrait painter (b. 1674)
- November 23 – Eugene Jean, Count of Soissons, Prince of Savoy (b. 1714)
- December 5 – Peter Tillemans, Flemish painter (b. c. 1684)
- December 8 – James Figg, English prizefighter
- December 28 – Rob Roy MacGregor, Scottish clan chief (b. 1671)
- date unknown
  - Richard Cantillon, Irish-French economist and author
  - Étienne de Veniard, Sieur de Bourgmont, French explorer (b. 1679)

1735

- January 5 – Carlo Ruzzini, Doge of Venice (b. 1653)
- January 12 – John Eccles, British composer (b. 1668)
- January 13 – Polyxena of Hesse-Rotenburg, Queen consort of Sardinia (b. 1706)
- January 18 – Maria Clementina Sobieska, Polish noble (b. 1702)
- February 27 – John Arbuthnot, British physician and author (b. 1667)
- March 25 – Daniel Gottlieb Messerschmidt, German scientist (b. 1685)
- April 5 – William Derham, English minister and writer (b. 1657)
- April 8 – Francis II Rákóczi, Hungarian rebel against the Habsburgs (b. 1676)
- April 23 – Edward Hawarden, English Catholic theologian (b. 1662)
- April 25 – Samuel Wesley, English poet, religious leader (b. 1662)
- June 10 – Thomas Hearne, British antiquarian (b. 1678)
- June 22 – Pirro Albergati, Italian composer (b. 1663)
- July 18 – Johann Krieger, German composer and organist (b. 1651)
- July 26 – Jesper Swedberg, Swedish bishop (b. 1653)
- July 29 – Sophia Louise of Mecklenburg-Schwerin, Prussian queen consort (b. 1685)
- August 30 – Edward Harley, English politician (b. 1664)
- September 18 – Justus van Effen, Dutch author (b. 1684)
- September 27 – Peter Artedi, Swedish naturalist (drowned) (b. 1705)

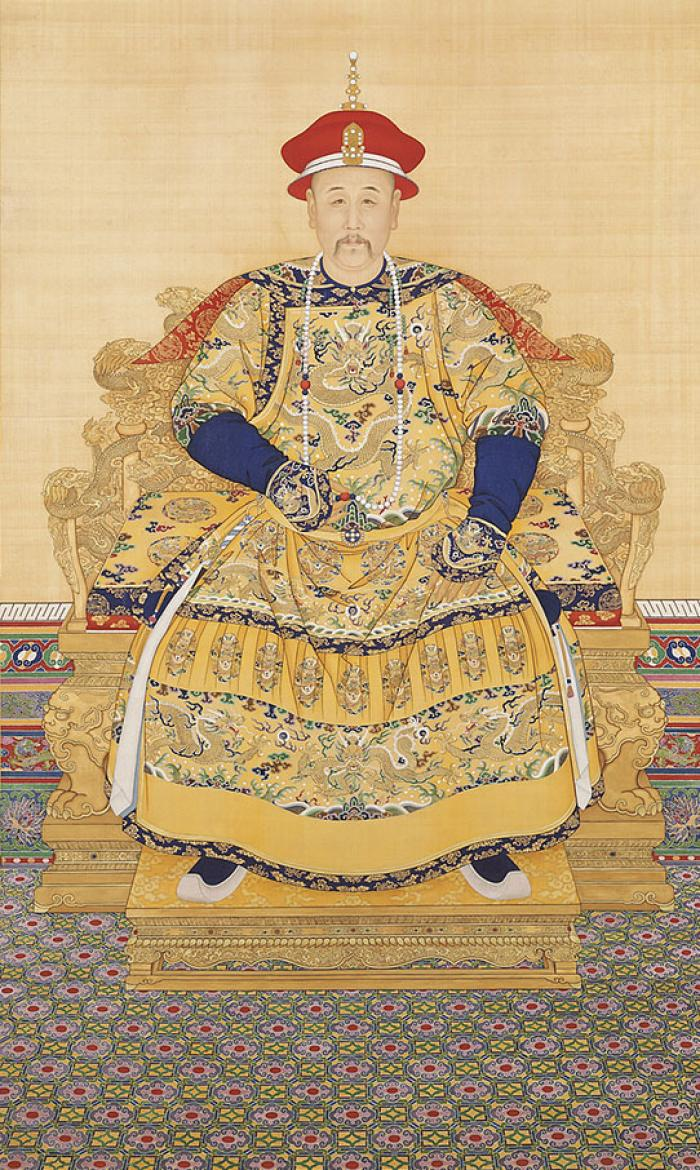
Yongzheng Emperor

- October 8 – Yongzheng Emperor of Qing China (b. 1678)
- October 26 – Margareta von Ascheberg, Swedish land owner, countess and acting regiment colonel (b. 1671)
- November 14 – Frederick William, Prince of Hohenzollern-Hechingen (b. 1663)
- November 29 – Bernardo de Hoyos, Beatified Spanish priest (b. 1711)
- December 14 – Thomas Tanner, English bishop, antiquarian (b. 1674)

1736

- January 8 – Jean Leclerc (theologian), Swiss theologian and biblical scholar (b. 1657)
- January 17 – Matthäus Daniel Pöppelmann, German architect (b. 1662)
- January 31 – Filippo Juvarra, Italian architect (b. 1678)
- February 1 – James Stanley, 10th Earl of Derby, English politician (b. 1664)
- February 7 – Stephen Gray, English dyer, astronomer, and scientist (b. 1666)
- March 16 – Giovanni Battista Pergolesi, Italian composer (b. 1710)
- March 25 – Nicholas Hawksmoor, British architect (b. c. 1661)

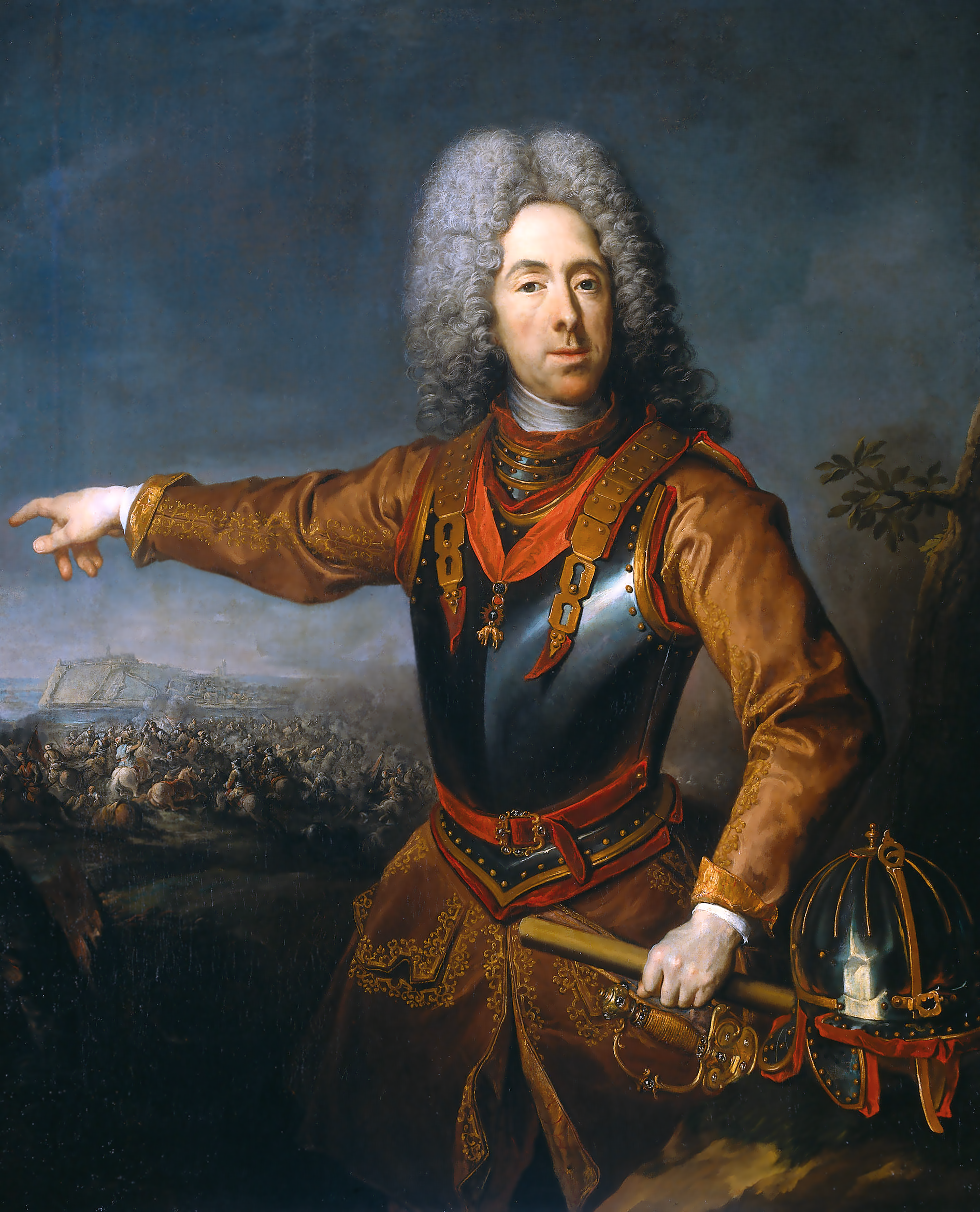
Prince Eugene of Savoy

- April 21 – Prince Eugene of Savoy, French-born Austrian general (b. 1663)
- April 30 – Johann Albert Fabricius, German scholar and bibliographer (b. 1668)
- May 9 – Diogo de Mendonça Corte-Real, Portuguese politician (b. 1658)
- June 6 – Jean Baptiste de La Vérendrye, explorer of New France, eldest son of Pierre Gaultier de Varennes et de La Vérendrye (b. 1713)
- July 1 – Ahmed III, Ottoman Sultan (b. 1673)
- July 7 – William Hardres, British politician (b. 1686)
- August 14 – Victor Honoré Janssens, Flemish painter (b. 1658)

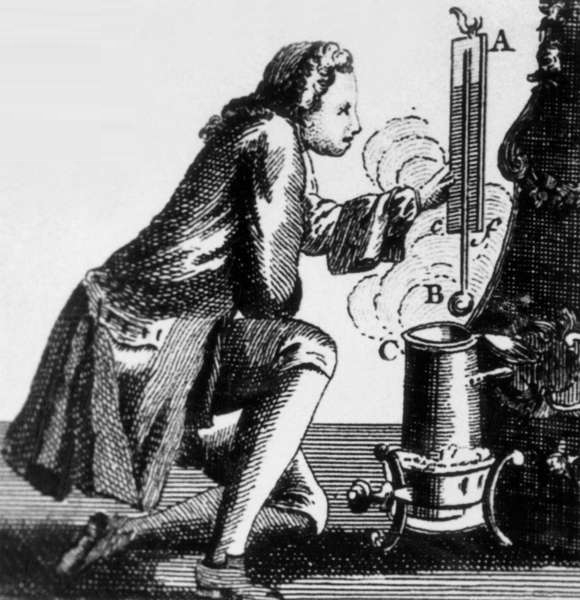
Daniel Gabriel Fahrenheit

- September 6 – John Porteous, Scottish captain (b. c. 1695)
- September 16 – Daniel Gabriel Fahrenheit, German physicist and inventor (b. 1686)
- September 26 – Louise Diane d'Orléans, youngest child of Philippe II, Duke of Orleans (b. 1716)
- October 22 – George Clarke, English politician, architect (b. 1661)
- November 2 – Louis Antoine de Pardaillan de Gondrin, French duke (b. 1664)
- December 10 – António Manoel de Vilhena, Portuguese 66th Grandmaster of the Knights Hospitaller (b. 1663)
- December 12 (burial) – Antonina Houbraken, Dutch draughtswoman (b. 1686)
- December 22 – Sir William Robinson, 1st Baronet, British politician (b. 1655)
- December 26 – Antonio Caldara, Italian composer (b. 1670)
- date unknown
  - Anna Colbjørnsdatter, Norwegian heroine (b. 1667)
  - Chen Shu, Chinese painter (b. 1660)

1737

- January 24 – William Wake, Archbishop of Canterbury (b. 1657)
- January 29 – George Hamilton, 1st Earl of Orkney, British soldier (b. 1666)
- February 14 – Charles Talbot, 1st Baron Talbot of Hensol, Lord Chancellor of Great Britain (b. 1685)
- March 12 – Charles Alexander, Duke of Württemberg, regent of the Kingdom of Serbia (1720–1733) (b. 1684)
- March 16 – Benjamin Wadsworth, American President of Harvard University (b. 1670)
- March 26 – Vakhtang VI of Kartli, king of the Kingdom of Kartli under the Bagrationi dynasty (b. 1675)
- May 3 – James Johnston (Secretary of State), diplomat, Secretary of State for Scotland (b. 1655)
- May 4
  - Eustace Budgell, English writer (b. 1686)
  - Ferdinand Kettler, Duke of Courland and Semigallia (b. 1655)
- May 10 – Emperor Nakamikado of Japan (b. 1702)
- May 17 – Claude Buffier, French philosopher and historian (b. 1661)
- June 6 – Pierre Joseph Garidel, French botanist (b. 1658)
- July 26 – Henri-Pons de Thiard de Bissy, French Catholic priest, bishop and cardinal (b. 1657)
- July 9 – Gian Gastone de' Medici, Grand Duke of Tuscany (b. 1671)
- July 26 – Johan Cronman, Swedish general (b. 1662)
- July 27 – Maria Maddalena Martinengo, Italian nun (b. 1687)
- September 27 – John Sidney, 6th Earl of Leicester, English privy councillor (b. 1680)
- October 12 – François Catrou, French historian and Jesuit priest (b. 1659)
- October 26 – Rinaldo d'Este, Duke of Modena (b. 1655)
- November 11 – Claude de Visdelou, French missionary (b. 1656)
- November 20 – Caroline of Ansbach, queen of George II of Great Britain (b. 1683)
- December 11 – John Strype, English historian and biographer (b. 1643)

Antonio Stradivari

- December 18 – Antonio Stradivari, Italian luthier (b. 1644)
- December 19 – James Sobieski, Crown Prince of Poland (b. 1667)
- December 21 – Alessandro Galilei, Italian architect, mathematician (b. 1691)
- December 27
  - William Bowyer, English printer (b. 1663)
  - Victor-Marie d'Estrées, Marshal of France (b. 1660)
- Date unknown – Sally Mapp, English lay bonesetter

1738

- January 6 – Franz Xaver Murschhauser, German composer and theorist (b. 1663)
- January 24 – Samuel Andrew, American Congregational clergyman, educator (b. 1656)
- January 27 – Marie Wulf, Danish pietist leader (b. 1685)
- January 30 – Benoît de Maillet, French diplomat and natural historian (b. 1656)
- February 9 – Béatrice Hiéronyme de Lorraine, Abbess of Remiremont (b. 1662)
- February 15 – Matthias Braun, Czech sculptor (b. 1684)
- February 27 – Henry Grove, English nonconformist minister (b. 1684)
- March 16 – George Bähr, German architect (b. 1666)
- March 25 – Turlough O'Carolan, Irish harper and composer (b. 1670)
- April 9 – Sir Charles Blois, 1st Baronet, English politician (b. 1657)
- May 1 – Charles Howard, 3rd Earl of Carlisle, English statesman (b. c. 1669)
- May 15 – Sir John Chesshyre, English lawyer (b. 1662)
- June 5 – Isaac de Beausobre, French Protestant pastor (b. 1659)
- June 21 – Charles Townshend, 2nd Viscount Townshend, English politician (b. 1674)
- July 8 – Jean-Pierre Nicéron, French encyclopedist (b. 1685)
- July 28 – Heinrich, Duke of Saxe-Merseburg (b. 1661)

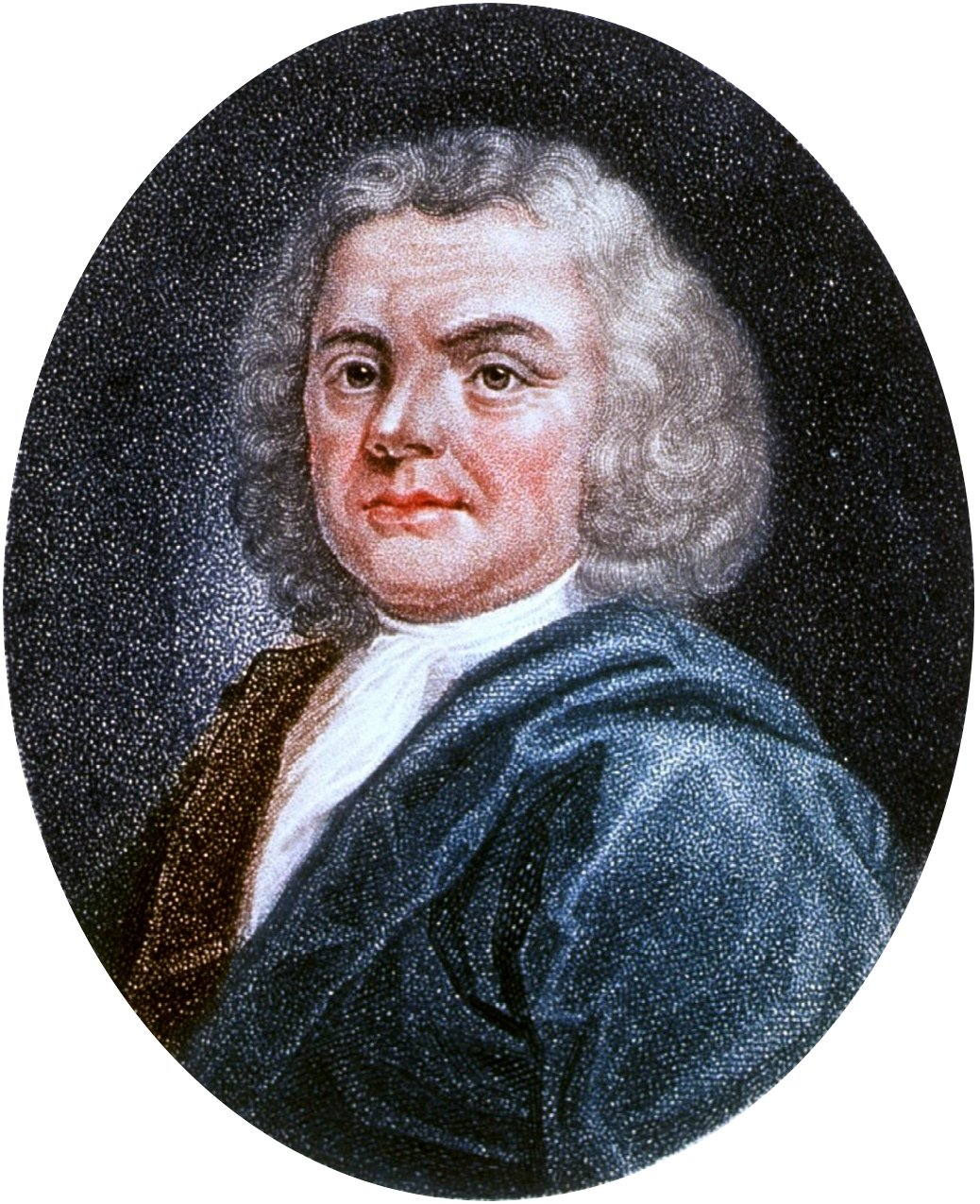
Herman Boerhaave

- September 23 – Herman Boerhaave, Dutch humanist, physician (b. 1668)
- December 22 – Constantia Jones, English prostitute (executed) (b. c. 1708)

1739

- January 20 – Francesco Galli Bibiena, Italian architect/designer (b. 1659)
- March 5 – John Joseph of the Cross, Italian saint (b. 1654)
- March 7 – Anton Maria Maragliano, Italian artist (b. 1664)

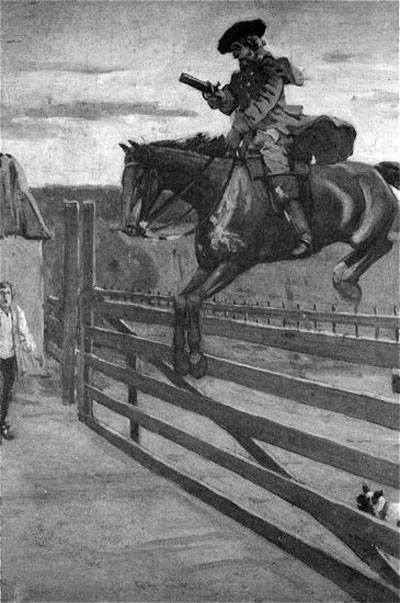
Dick Turpin

- April 7 – Dick Turpin, English highwayman (hanged) (b. 1705)
- April 19 – Nicholas Saunderson, English scientist and mathematician (b. 1682)
- May 10 – Cosmas Damian Asam, German painter and architect during the late Baroque period (b. 1686)
- June 18 – Charles Frederick, Duke of Holstein-Gottorp, Swedish nobleman (b. 1700)
- June 20 – Edmond Martène, French Benedictine historian and liturgist (b. 1654)
- July 24 – Benedetto Marcello, Italian composer (b. 1686)
- September 8 – Yuri Troubetzkoy, Governor of Belgorod (b. 1668)
- September 12 – Ernest Louis, Landgrave of Hesse-Darmstadt (b. 1667)
- September 19 – Anne Marie Louise de La Tour d'Auvergne, French princess (b. 1722)
- October 6 – Françoise Charlotte d'Aubigné, French noble (b. 1684)
- October 18 – Antônio José da Silva, Brazilian-born dramatist (b. 1705)
- November 14 – Juan de Galavís, Spanish Catholic archbishop (b. 1683)
- November 16 – Harry Grey, 3rd Earl of Stamford, English peer (b. 1685)
- date unknown – Anne Dodd, English news seller, pamphlet shop proprietor (b. 1685)
