= Regina-Louise von Freedricksz =

Russian baroness and industrialist (1735–1821)

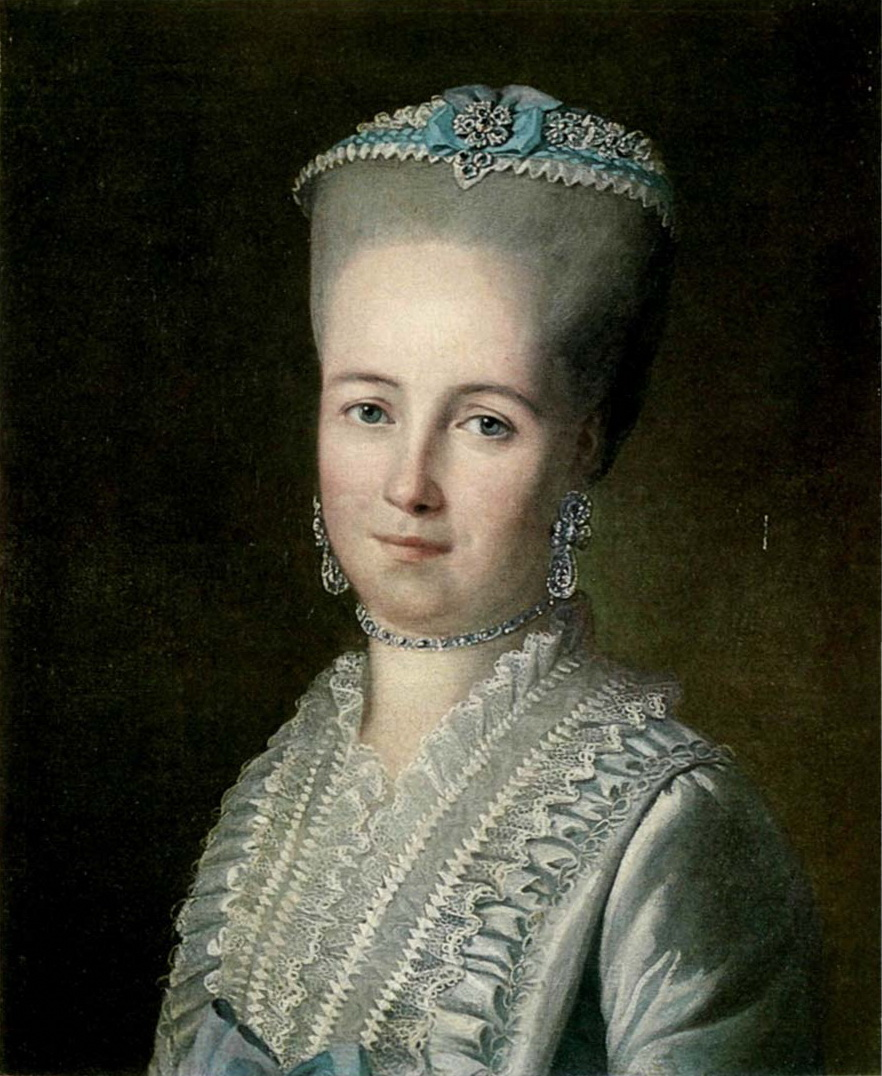
Regina-Louise von Freedricksz

Regina-Louise "Irina" von Freedricksz née Christineck (1735–1821), was a Russian baroness and industrialist.

Regina-Louise von Freedricksz was born into a German family in St Petersburg. She married baron Ivan von Freedricksz (1723–1779), court banker to empress Catherine the Great, with whom she had nine children.

In 1773, her spouse bought lands around Lake Ladoga, where he founded the estate Irinovka (named after her), where he managed a peat-extraction enterprise, an ironwork and a dairy farm. The following year, Regina-Louise herself founded a crystal works by the Marya river. In contrast to Western Europe, where married women where under the legal guardianship of their husbands, the Russian law of 1753 acknowledged married women the right to own and manage property in their own name independent from their husbands. In the late 18th-century, nobles founding factories was not unusual in Russia, where the merchant class was still small, and some noblewomen became successful industrialists: out of fourteen female factory owners in lat 18th-century Northern Russa, ten where noblewomen. Regina-Louise von Freedricksz was successful as an industrialist, and in 1794, she founded a second factory at Irinovka estate. Her two factories produced 400 crates per annum of high quality to a value of 24800 roubles. Initially she managed them herself, but she eventually leased them to Franz Nachmann, Sebastian Nachmann and Anna Erofeeva. She sold the factories in 1812, and they continued to function until 1912.
