= Constantia Jones =

British prostitute (c. 1708 – 1738)

Constantia Jones (c.1708 – 22 December 1738) was a prostitute in London, which was then part of the Kingdom of Great Britain, during the term of Prime Minister Robert Walpole. She was sentenced to hang for stealing 36 shillings and a half-guinea from one of her clients.

== Conviction ==
Jones's accuser, describing her as "a three-penny upright," testified as follows: "As I stood against the Wall, [she] came behind me, and with one hand she took hold of . . . --and the other she thrust into my Breeches Pocket and took my Money." Based on this testimony, Jones was sentenced to hang at Tyburn.

Jones, who had been sent to the notorious prison at Newgate some twenty times before, was 30 years old upon her execution. Historian Peter Linebaugh asserts that regardless of her guilt or innocence, her conviction on such flimsy evidence indicates the bias of 18th-century English courts against the trade of prostitution and those who worked in the industry. Although officially London courts took all persons as equally worthy, class distinctions were still operative, and therefore testimony from a "gentleman," in particular, would weigh heavily against that of a prostitute. Jones would have been a weak defendant, as she had been in Newgate on multiple occasions.

== Sources ==
- Linebaugh, Peter (2003). The London Hanged: Crime and Civil Society in the Eighteenth Century. Verso. ISBN 9781859846384.
- Linnane, Fergus (2004). London's Underworld: Three Centuries of Vice and Crime. Robson. ISBN 9781861057426.
- McEnery, Anthony; Baker, Helen (2016). Corpus Linguistics and 17th-Century Prostitution: Computational Linguistics and History. Bloomsbury Publishing. ISBN 9781472512833.
