= John Hancock (silversmith) =

American silversmith known for his craftsmanship

John Hancock (October 10, 1732 – September 24, 1784) was an American silversmith.

Hancock was born in Charlestown, Massachusetts and married Martha Sparhawk on November 20, 1760. There is no known record of his apprenticeship. He worked from 1760 to 1770 in Boston, from about 1770 to 1774 in Providence, Rhode Island, and from about July 1774 to 1784 in Oxford, Maryland, where he died. His estate inventory listed silversmithing tools valued at 30 pounds. Only a few of his pieces are still known to exist.

His work is collected in the Metropolitan Museum of Art and Museum of Fine Arts, Boston.
