= 1738 =

1738 in various calendars
- Gregorian calendar: 1738; MDCCXXXVIII
- Ab urbe condita: 2491
- Armenian calendar: 1187; ԹՎ ՌՃՁԷ
- Assyrian calendar: 6488
- Balinese saka calendar: 1659–1660
- Bengali calendar: 1144–1145
- Berber calendar: 2688
- British Regnal year: 11 Geo. 2 – 12 Geo. 2
- Buddhist calendar: 2282
- Burmese calendar: 1100
- Byzantine calendar: 7246–7247
- Chinese calendar: 丁巳年 (Fire Snake); 4435 or 4228 — to — 戊午年 (Earth Horse); 4436 or 4229
- Coptic calendar: 1454–1455
- Discordian calendar: 2904
- Ethiopian calendar: 1730–1731
- Hebrew calendar: 5498–5499
- Hindu calendars
- Vikram Samvat: 1794–1795
- Shaka Samvat: 1659–1660
- Kali Yuga: 4838–4839
- Holocene calendar: 11738
- Igbo calendar: 738–739
- Iranian calendar: 1116–1117
- Islamic calendar: 1150–1151
- Japanese calendar: Genbun 3 (元文３年)
- Javanese calendar: 1662–1663
- Julian calendar: Gregorian minus 11 days
- Korean calendar: 4071
- Minguo calendar: 174 before ROC 民前174年
- Nanakshahi calendar: 270
- Thai solar calendar: 2280–2281
- Tibetan calendar: མེ་མོ་སྦྲུལ་ལོ་ (female Fire-Snake); 1864 or 1483 or 711 — to — ས་ཕོ་རྟ་ལོ་ (male Earth-Horse); 1865 or 1484 or 712

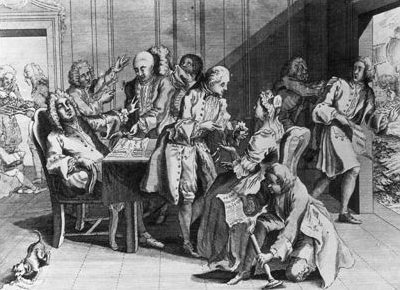
March 28: Seaman Robert Jenkins persuades British Parliament to authorize the War of Jenkins' Ear that claims 25,000 lives

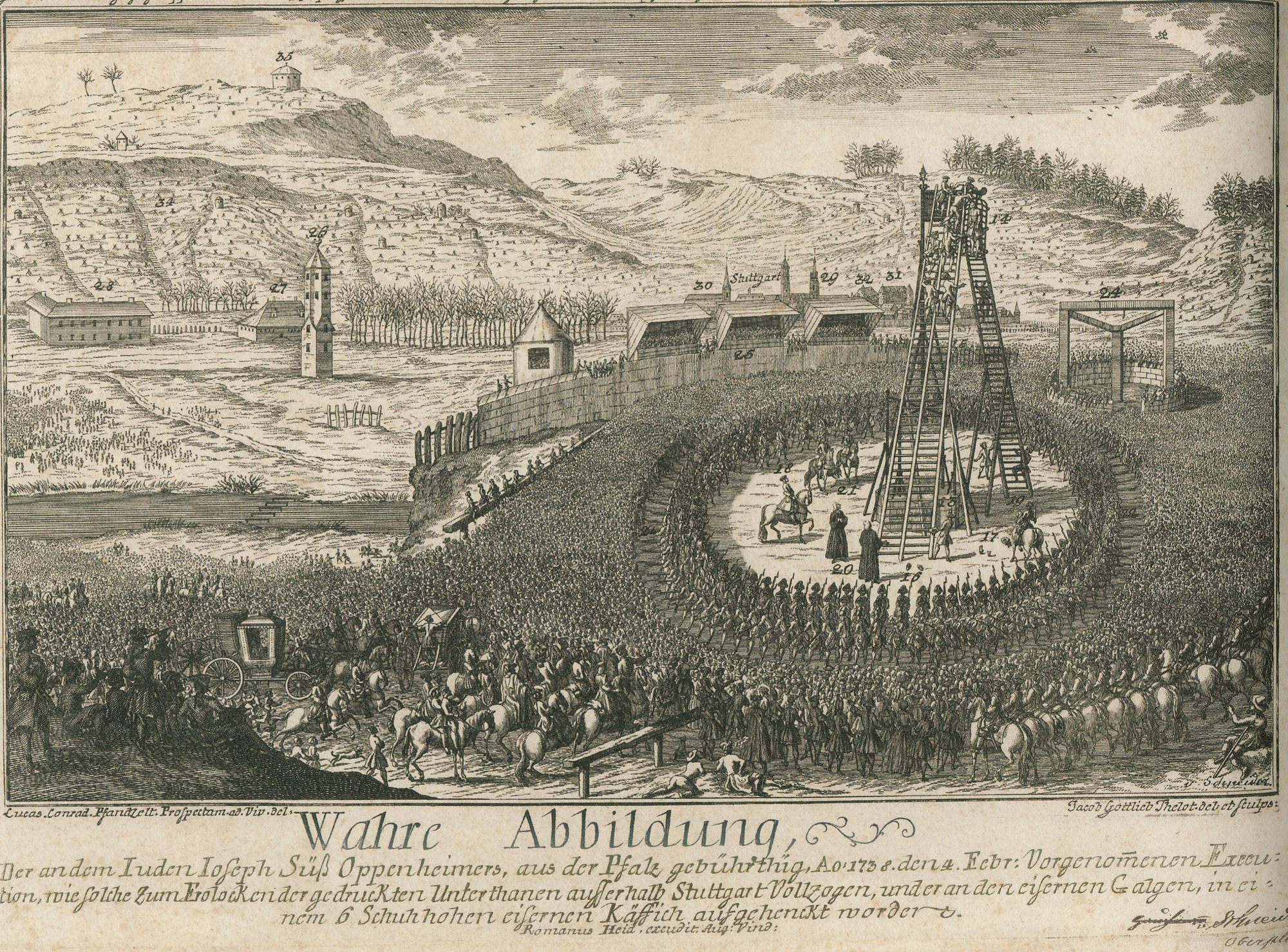
February 4: Joseph Süß Oppenheimer is executed in Württemberg.

1738 (MDCCXXXVIII) was a common year starting on Wednesday of the Gregorian calendar and a common year starting on Sunday of the Julian calendar, the 1738th year of the Common Era (CE) and Anno Domini (AD) designations, the 738th year of the 2nd millennium, the 38th year of the 18th century, and the 9th year of the 1730s decade. As of the start of 1738, the Gregorian calendar was 11 days ahead of the Julian calendar, which remained in localized use until 1923.

== Events ==
=== January–March ===
- January 1 – At least 664 African slaves drown when the Dutch West Indies Company slave ship Leusden capsizes and sinks in the Maroni River during its arrival in Surinam. The Dutch crew escapes, and leaves the slaves locked below decks to die.
- January 3 – George Frideric Handel's opera Faramondo is given its first performance.
- January 7 – After the Maratha Empire of India wins the Battle of Bhopal over the Jaipur State, Jaipur cedes the Malwa territory to the Maratha in a treaty signed at Doraha.
- February 4 – Court Jew Joseph Süß Oppenheimer is executed in Württemberg.
- February 11 – Jacques de Vaucanson stages the first demonstration of an early automaton, The Flute Player at the Hotel de Longueville in Paris, and continues to display it until March 30.
- February 20 – The Swedish Levant Company is founded.
- March 28 – Mariner Robert Jenkins presents a pickled ear, which he claims was cut off by a Spanish captain in the Caribbean in 1731, to the Parliament of Great Britain, which votes, 257 to 209, for war against Spain, leading to the War of Jenkins' Ear the following year.

=== April–June ===
- April 15 – Serse, an Italian opera by George Frideric Handel, premieres in London.
- April 18 – Spain's Royal Academy of History (Real Academia de la Historia) is established by decree of King Philip V of Spain.
- April 28 – Pope Clement XII issues the papal bull In eminenti apostolatus, prohibiting Roman Catholics from being members of Masonic societies.
- May 4 – The Imperial Theatrical School, in modern times known as Vaganova Academy of Russian Ballet, is founded under the reign of Empress Anna. It is the first ballet school in Russia and second in the world.
- May 24 – John Wesley, newly returned from America, experiences a spiritual rebirth at a Moravian Church meeting in Aldersgate, in the City of London, essentially launching the Methodist movement; the day is celebrated annually by Methodists as Aldersgate Day (his younger brother Charles had a similar experience three days earlier).
- May 25 – The military phase of Cresap's War between the British North American Provinces of Maryland and Pennsylvania is ended when King George II of Great Britain negotiates a cease-fire.
- June 24 – British inventor Lewis Paul receives a patent for roller cotton-spinning machinery.
- June 27 – The Spanish Empire's Council of the Indies votes, 6 to 4, to re-establish the Viceroyalty of New Granada, incorporating modern-day Colombia, Ecuador, Venezuela and Panama. King Philip V issues the order on August 20, 1739.

=== July–September ===
- July 1 – English metallurgist William Champion is granted a patent for his process of extracting zinc from other materials in a furnace.
- July 10 – Thomas Pellow of Cornwall finally escapes captivity, 23 years after having been captured by Barbary pirates and held as a slave in Morocco. He arrives in British territory when the ship he is on sails into Gibraltar Bay on July 21, and later recounts his story in the book The Adventures of Thomas Pellow, of Penryn, Mariner: Three and Twenty Years in Captivity Among the Moors.
- August 10 – Russo-Turkish War (1735–1739): The Russian army begins its attempt to cross the Dniester River and fails after three weeks; it is later decimated by plague.
- September 18 – Samuel Johnson composes his first solemn prayer (published 1785).

=== October–December ===
- October 22 – The excavation of Herculaneum, a Roman city buried by Vesuvius in AD 79, begins near the Italian city of Resina on orders from King Charles III of Spain to his engineer, Rocque Joaquin de Alcubierre.
- November 18 – The Treaty of Vienna is ratified, ending the War of the Polish Succession. Under the terms of the treaty, Stanisław Leszczyński receives Lorraine in exchange for renouncing the Polish throne.
- December 27 – After setting off from Rotterdam in August with 240 immigrants to America, the British ship Princess Augusta is wrecked near Block Island off of the coast of the colony of Rhode Island. During the voyage, 200 passengers and seven crew die from illness spread by contaminated water. Another 20 die after the crew leaves and rows to shore. The wreck later becomes the subject of the legend of the "Palatine Light" ghost ship and of John Greenleaf Whittier's 1867 poem "The Palatine".

=== Date unknown ===
- China's Qing government announces that all western businessmen have to use the Cohong in Guangzhou to trade.
- Pierre Louis Maupertuis publishes Sur la figure de la terre, which confirms Newton's view that the earth is an oblate spheroid, slightly flattened at the poles.
- Black Forest clockmaker Franz Ketterer produces one of the earliest cuckoo clocks.
- Carl Philipp Emanuel Bach, having completed a law degree, is hired as a court musician by Crown Prince Frederick of Prussia, the future Frederick the Great (Bach will remain in Frederick's service until 1768).
- Holy Royal Arch is founded.
- Rémy Martin is granted exclusive permission by King Louis XV to plant new vineyards, for impressing him with the quality of his cognac.

== Births ==
- January 21 – Ethan Allen, American patriot (d. 1789)
- February 6 – Pierre-Joseph Desault, French anatomist and surgeon (d. 1795)
- April 12 – Padre Francisco Garcés, Spanish missionary (d. 1781)
- April 14 – William Cavendish-Bentinck, 3rd Duke of Portland, Prime Minister of the United Kingdom (d. 1809)
- May 27 – Nathaniel Gorham, American politician (d. 1796)
- May 28 – Joseph-Ignace Guillotin, French physician (d. 1814)
- June 4 – King George III of the United Kingdom (d. 1820)
- July 3 – John Singleton Copley, American painter (d. 1815)
- July 20 – Darejan Dadiani, Georgian queen consort (d. 1807)
- July 22 – Anne d'Yves, writer, participant in the Brabant Revolution (d. 1814)
- August 28 – Etteilla, French occult cartomancer (d. 1791)
- September 25 – Nicholas Van Dyke, American lawyer and President of Delaware (d. 1789)
- October 10 – Benjamin West, American painter (d. 1820)
- October 11 – Arthur Phillip, British admiral and Governor of New South Wales (d. 1814)
- October 18 – Andrei Bolotov, Russian agriculturalist and memoirist (d. 1833)
- October 29 – Charles Spalding, Scottish inventor and underwater diver (d. 1783)

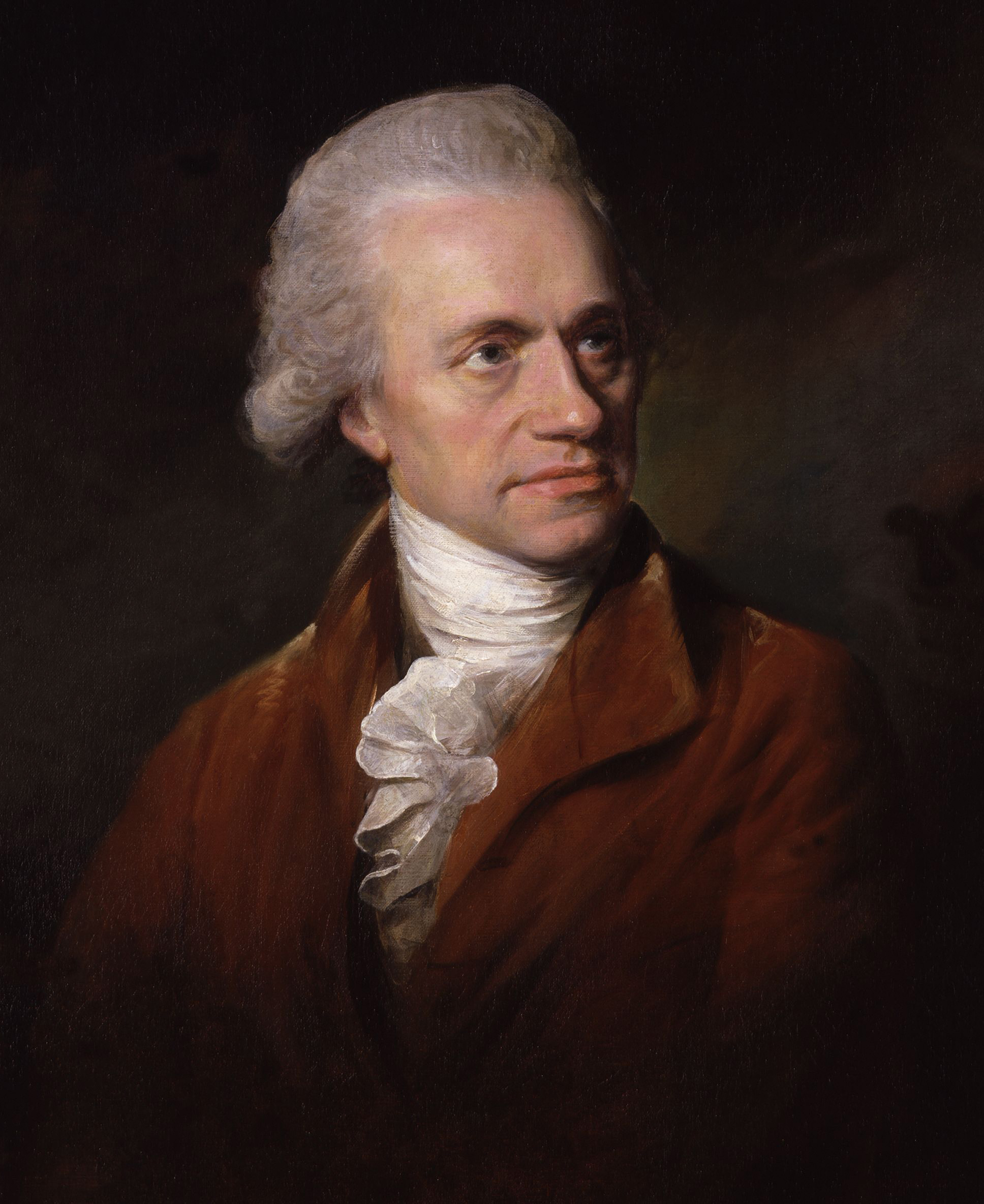
William Herschel

- November 15 – William Herschel, German-born astronomer (d. 1822)
- December 31 – Charles Cornwallis, 1st Marquess Cornwallis, British general (d. 1805)

== Deaths ==
- January 6 – Franz Xaver Murschhauser, German composer and theorist (b. 1663)
- January 24 – Samuel Andrew, American Congregational clergyman, educator (b. 1656)
- January 27 – Marie Wulf, Danish pietist leader (b. 1685)
- January 30 – Benoît de Maillet, French diplomat and natural historian (b. 1656)
- February 9 – Béatrice Hiéronyme de Lorraine, Abbess of Remiremont (b. 1662)
- February 15 – Matthias Braun, Czech sculptor (b. 1684)
- February 27 – Henry Grove, English nonconformist minister (b. 1684)
- March 16 – George Bähr, German architect (b. 1666)
- March 25 – Turlough O'Carolan, Irish harper and composer (b. 1670)
- April 9 – Sir Charles Blois, 1st Baronet, English politician (b. 1657)
- May 1 – Charles Howard, 3rd Earl of Carlisle, English statesman (b. c. 1669)
- May 15 – Sir John Chesshyre, English lawyer (b. 1662)
- June 5 – Isaac de Beausobre, French Protestant pastor (b. 1659)
- June 21 – Charles Townshend, 2nd Viscount Townshend, English politician (b. 1674)
- July 8 – Jean-Pierre Nicéron, French encyclopedist (b. 1685)
- July 28 – Heinrich, Duke of Saxe-Merseburg (b. 1661)

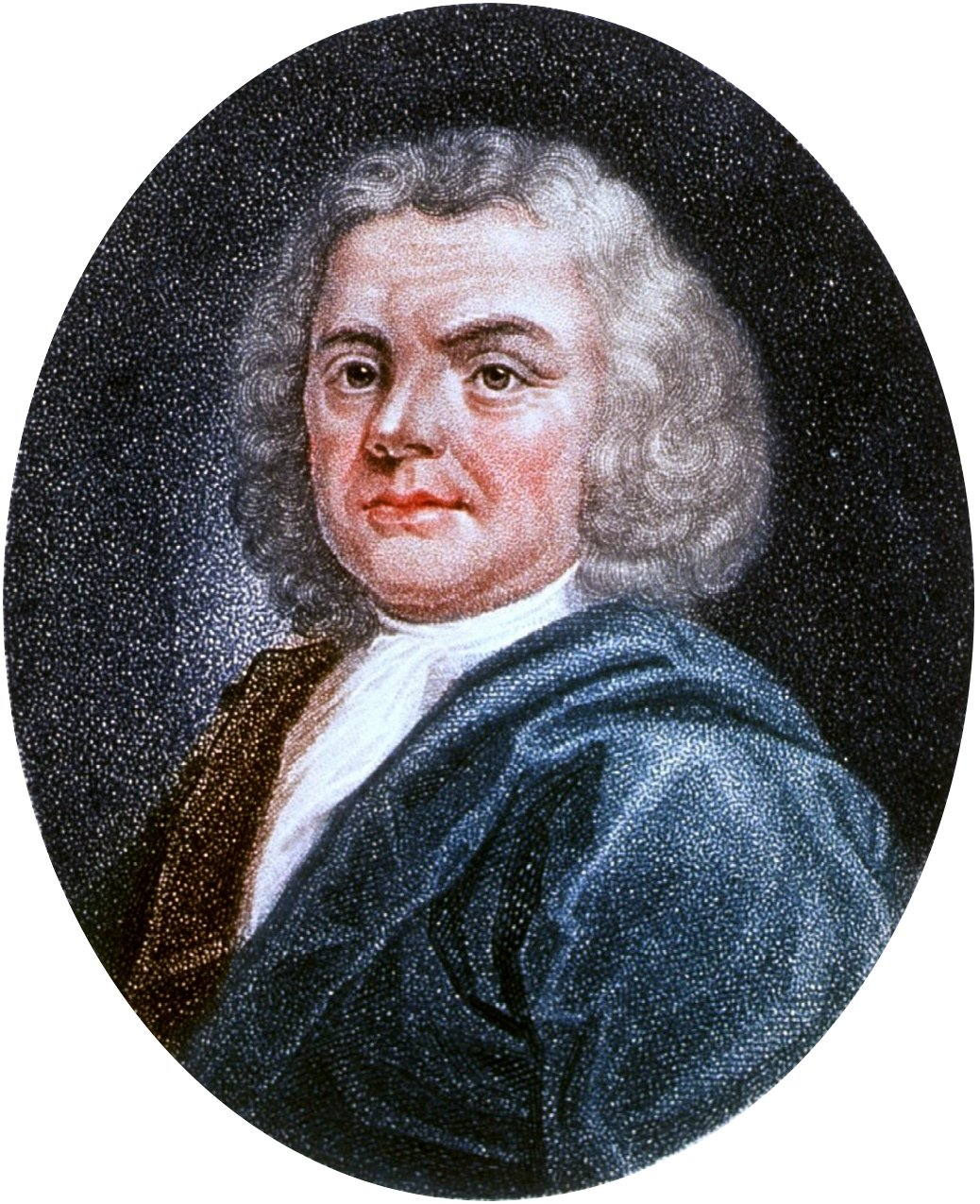
Herman Boerhaave

- September 23 – Herman Boerhaave, Dutch humanist, physician (b. 1668)
- December 22 – Constantia Jones, English prostitute (executed) (b. c. 1708)
