= Barkheda =

Barkheda and/or Barkhera may refer to the following entities in India :

== Madhya Pradesh, Central India ==
- Barkheda, Bhopal, a locality in the Bhopal city
- Barkheda, Raisen, a village in the Obedullaganj block of Raisen District

== Uttar Pradesh, Northern India ==
- Barkhera, a town in Pilibhit district of India
