= Manikhedi =

Manikhedi may refer to:

- Manikhedi (census code 482098), a village near Parason in Madhya Pradesh, India
- Manikhedi (census code 482297), a village near Dillod in Madhya Pradesh, India
