= Johan Schön =

Swedish ironmaster and businessperson

- Born: 1753; Stockholm, Sweden
- Died: April 8, 1805 (aged 51–52); Stockholm, Sweden
- Occupations: Ironmaster, businessperson
- Spouse: Elisabeth Palm (m. 1776; died 1789)
- Parent(s): Johan Martin Schön; Hedvig Strömberg

Johan Schön (1753 – 8 April 1805) was a Swedish ironmaster and businessperson.

== Early life ==
Johan Schön was born in Stockholm, the son of Johan Martin Schön (1721–1781), a businessman originally from Lübeck, and Hedvig Strömberg (1725–1807), daughter of the manufacturer Jöns Michaëlsson Strömberg.

== Career ==
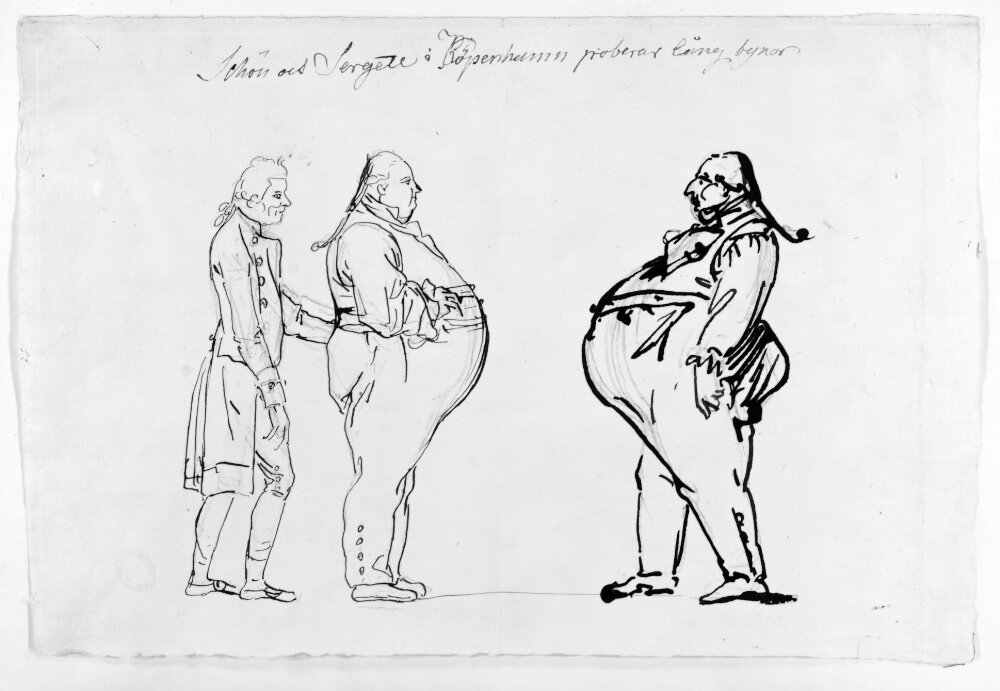
Johan Tobias Sergel, a close friend of Johan Schön, jokingly portrayed them trying on the latest fashion—long trousers—while in Copenhagen

Politically, Schön stood in opposition to Gustav III, a stance that was unusual for the 'Skeppsbroadel' (the merchant aristocracy of Skeppsbron).

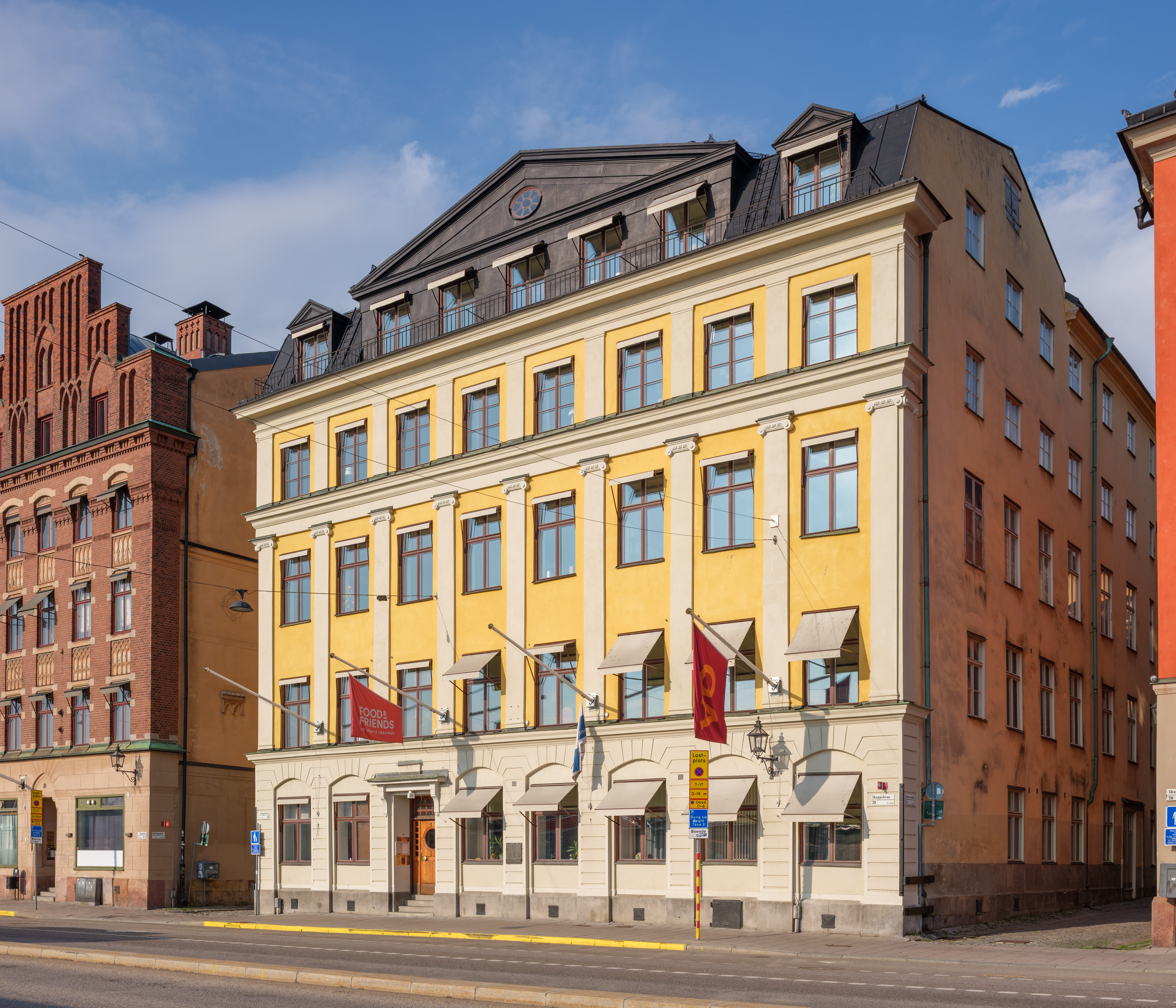
The Schön House is situated on Skeppsbron, one of Stockholm’s most prestigious and historic waterfront streets

During Schön's career, he had amassed a fortune that included landed estates, several interests in ironworks, manufactories, forge hammers, and blast furnaces, as well as shares in both the Swedish East and West India Companies. The firm Schön & Co was passed down to his son and grandson.

== Personal life ==
In March 1776, Johan Schön married the etcher Elisabeth Palm, (Note: She is also frequently referred to as Elisabeth Palm-Schön.) who was born in Constantinople. She was the daughter of Asmund Palm—a merchant and representative for the Swedish Levant Company—and Eva van Bruyn. The couple had several children, among them Hedvig Elisabeth, Maria Charlotta, and Gustava Adelaide Schön.

Schön was widowed in June 1789 when his wife, Elisabeth, died of tuberculosis. (Note: Elisabeth Palm's death is often wrongly dated to 1786; however, she actually passed away in 1789.)
