= Gustaf Palm =

Ottoman Empire-born Swedish supercargo

Supercargo for the Swedish East India Company

Personal details
- Born: c. 1760 Constantinople, Ottoman Empire (modern-day Istanbul, Turkey)
- Died: 1807 Canton, Guangdong, China
- Parent(s): Asmund Palm; Eva van Bruyn

Gustaf Palm (c. 1760 – 1807) was a Swedish supercargo for the Swedish East India Company in Guangzhou.

== Biography ==
Gustaf Palm was born in the Ottoman Empire, where his father, Asmund Palm, served as a merchant and representative for the Swedish Levant Company, based in Smyrna and Constantinople. His mother was Eva van Bruyn, a member of the Dutch nobility. His sisters, Maria Palm-Hebbe (nicknamed 'Mimica'), and Elisabeth Palm-Schön, were also etchers.

Palm served as a supercargo for the Swedish East India Company. He appears to have reached Canton in 1799, serving first as an assistant before completing his period there in 1807. Palm was the final individual to hold the post of supercargo in Guangzhou.

A portrait of Palm was painted by Jonas Forsslund.
