= Ottoman–Swedish Treaty =

1737 trade agreement between the Ottoman Empire and Sweden

- Type: Trade treaty
- Signed: 10 January 1737
- Location: Istanbul
- Parties: (Swedish Empire) Sweden; Ottoman Empire

The Ottoman–Swedish Treaty was a trade agreement between the Ottoman Empire and Sweden in 1737.

== Stipulations ==
- The Swedish Levant Company is created
- Sweden is granted the same privileges as other European nation on a most-favored-nation basis.
- The judicial privileges of Swedes in the Ottoman Empire were made the same as those of nationals from other Western nations with one exception, if there was a dispute between a Swedish and Ottoman subject, it should not be judged except in the presence of the Swedish consul or dragoman.
- The Swedish diplomatic and consular representatives were ordered to see to it that no Swedish subject committed a crime, but if one was still committed, the offender was to be punished by the Swedish consul or Ambassador.
- All Swedish subjects were to be allowed freedom of religion

== Results ==
With this and the following defensive alliance in 1739 against Russia, Ottoman–Swedish relations had reached its peak.
