= Maria Palm-Hebbe =

Ottoman Empire-born Swedish etcher

Maria Palm
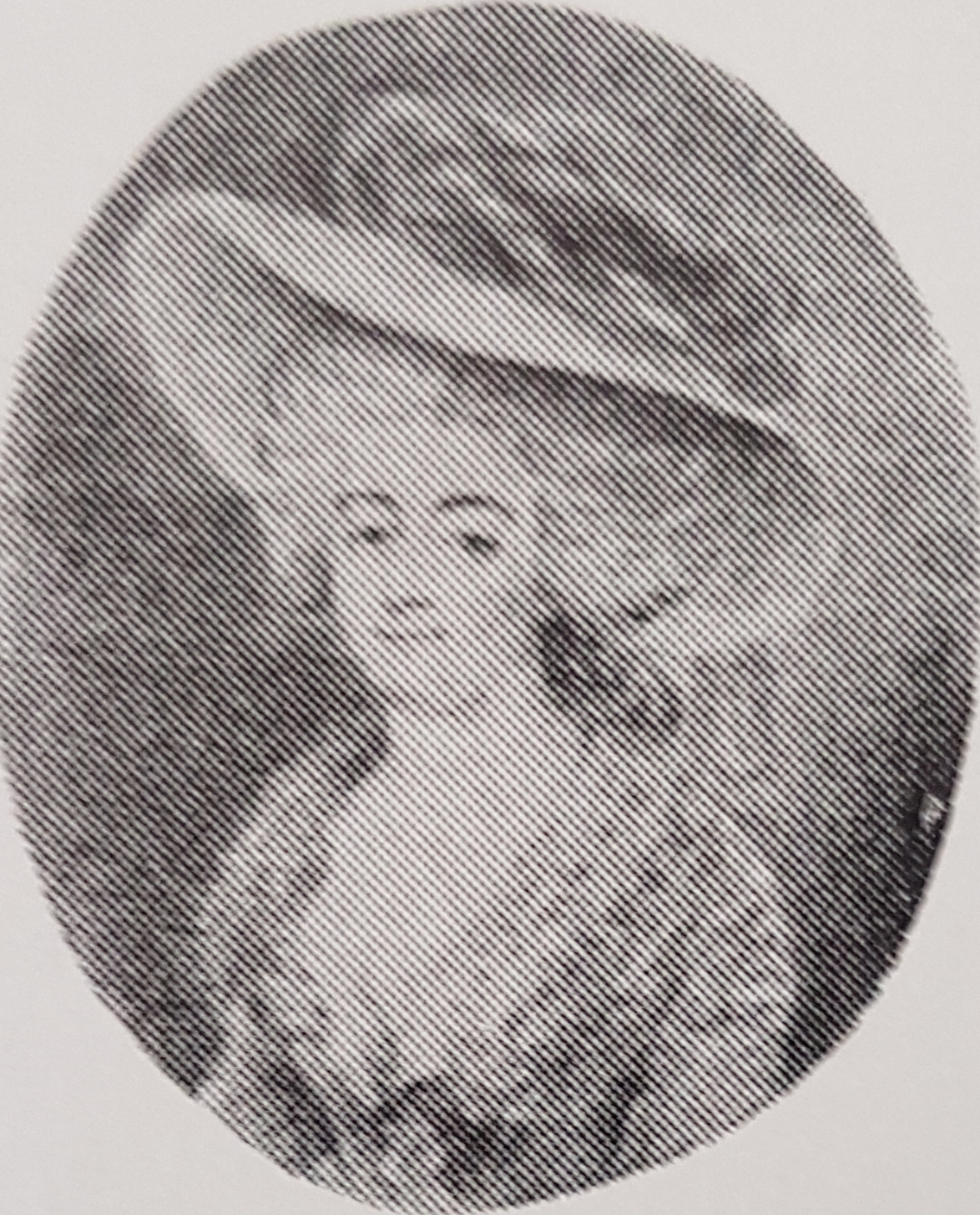
- Born: 8 July 1754; Constantinople, Ottoman Empire (modern-day Istanbul, Turkey)
- Died: 2 January 1800 (aged 45); Stockholm, Sweden
- Occupation: Etcher
- Spouse: Christian Hebbe
- Parent(s): Asmund Palm; Eva van Bruyn
- Relatives: Elisabeth Palm (sister); Gustaf Palm (brother)

Maria Palm (8 July 1754 – 2 January 1800) was a Swedish etcher.

== Life ==
Elisabeth Palm was born in the Ottoman Empire, where her father, Asmund Palm, served as a merchant and representative for the Swedish Levant Company, based in Smyrna and Constantinople. Her mother was Eva van Bruyn, a member of the Dutch nobility. One of her sisters, Elisabeth Palm, was also an artist, and her brother, Gustaf Palm, was a supercargo to the Swedish East India Company.

Palm studied art under Jacob Gillberg, alongside her sister, in 1770, and is represented in the National Museum of Sweden and in the Uppsala University Library by etchings.

In 1771, Maria Palm married the businessman Christian Hebbe. Their daughter, Elisabeth Maria Hebbe, served as Lady of the State to the Queen of Sweden, Frederica of Baden.

Palm died in Stockholm on January 2, 1800.
