= Obedullaganj =

- city
- Location in Madhya Pradesh, India Obedullaganj (India)
- Coordinates: 23°0′4″N 77°34′55″E
- Country: India
- State: Madhya Pradesh
- District: Raisen

Population (2001)
  - Total: 19,955

Languages
  - Official: Hindi
- Time zone: UTC+5:30 (IST)
- ISO 3166 code: IN-MP
- Vehicle registration: MP

Obedullaganj is a town and a nagar panchayat in Raisen district in the Indian state of Madhya Pradesh. It is situated 70 km from its district headquarter Raisen and 36 km from its state capital city Bhopal.

== Demographics ==
As of 2001 India census, Obedullaganj has a population of 19,955. Males constitute 53% of the population and females 47%. Obedullaganj has an average literacy rate of 67%, higher than the national average of 59.5%; male literacy is 74%, and female literacy is 59%. In Obedullaganj, 15% of the population is under 6 years of age.

== Administration ==
Obedullaganj is an administrative block with 72 gram panchayats and 231 villages under it. Barkheda is one of the major villages in the Obedullaganj block. A large Galla Mandi is located in Obedullaganj.

== Places to visit ==
There is very ancient Khedapati Mata Mandir at Hiraniya ward of Obedullaganj. There are two Jain temples and a famous Parasnath Digambar Temple situated on railway station road of Obedullaganj. Obedullaganj has three mosques including Masjid-e-munawwari and have a Ram Mandir with several temples and a Gurudwara. One of the old Digamber Jain Mandir, which was built by the freedom fighter Shri Parab Chand Jain, is situated on the main road of mid town.

== Historical significance ==
Obedullaganj is in the center of several historical places such as the Bhojeshwar Temple of Lord Shiva built by king Bhoj of the Paramara dynasty and Salkanpur, a sacred Siddhpeeth of Vindhyavasni Beejasan Devi (one of the incarnation of the Hindu goddess Durga). Others important places include Delawadi and Bhimbetka rock shelters.
