= Asmund Palm =

Swedish representative consul and merchant (c. 1715–1780)

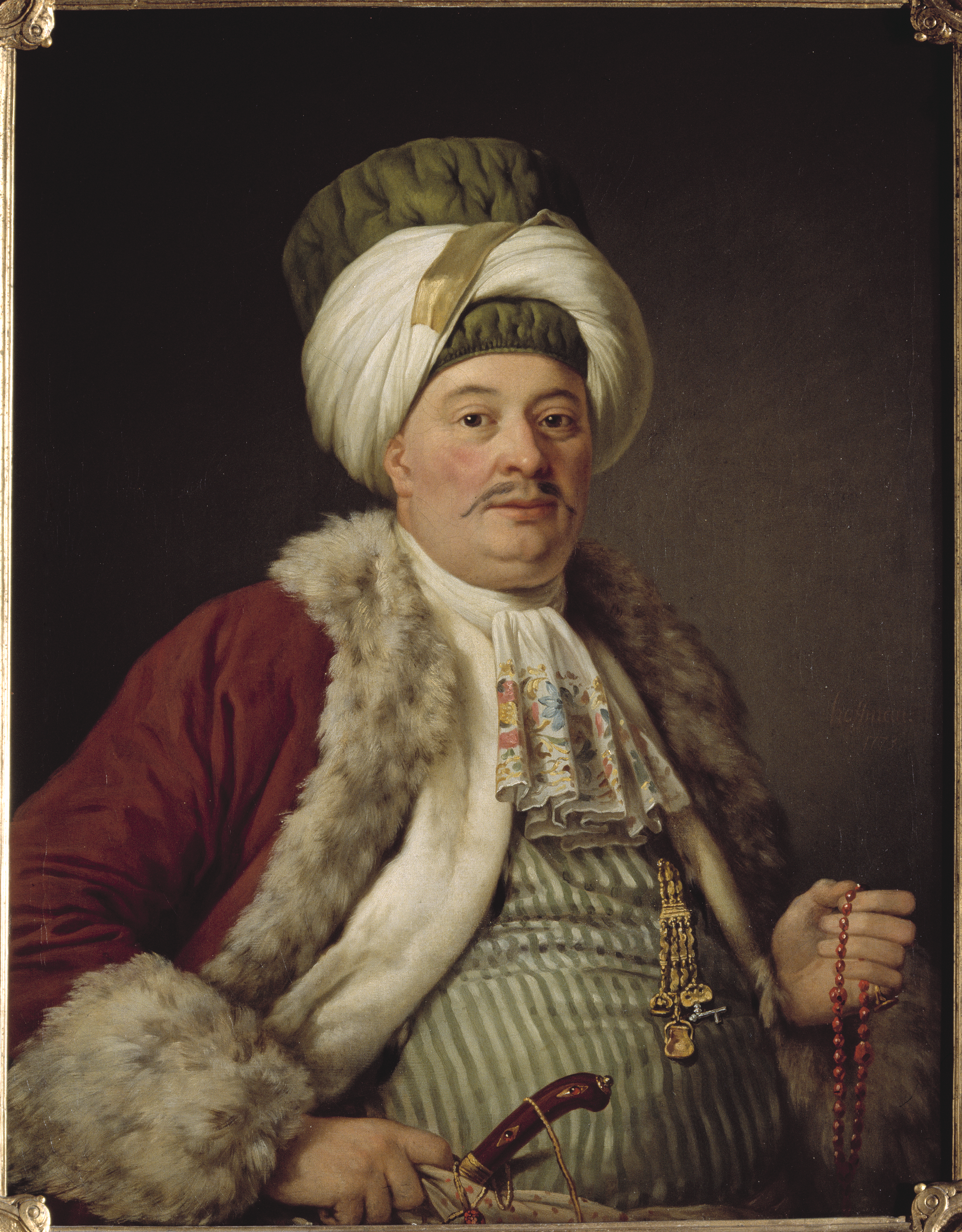
- Asmund Palm
- Born: Cornelius Asmund Palm c. 1715
- Died: 4 February 1780; Stockholm, Sweden
- Occupation: Merchant
- Spouses: Eva van Bruyn; Fatma
- Children: Elisabeth; Gustaf; Maria

Cornelius Asmund Palm (c. 1715 – 4 February 1780) was a Swedish representative consul and merchant. Based in Constantinople, Palm took up business in both Smyrna and Constantinople. He was a representative consul for the Kingdom of Sweden, serving the nation's interests in the Ottoman Empire, and director of the chartered Swedish Levant Company.

== Life and work ==
Asmund Palm was born in the 1710s. In his youth, he accompanied a Swedish ship with Constantinople as its destination. When it was about to unload, Palm fell ill and got hospitalized. During his stay at the hospital, Palm spent his time practicing the Turkish language. Then, he took up employment at Ali Schaffei's, practicing as a merchant in Constantinople.

Palm served as director of the Swedish Levant Company in Smyrna. He imported coffee beans, raisins, and oriental carpets to Sweden during his service. Together with Christian Hebbe (1725–1800), he was one of the company's most important people. Palm later moved to Constantinople after several years, where he was positioned as consul in the Ottoman Empire for the Swedish Empire.

Palm was married twice; to the daughter of his employer, Fatma, and to Eva van Bruyn, a member of the Dutch nobility. He had three children with Van Bruyn, including Elisabeth, Gustaf (1760–1807), and Mimica Palm.

Palm moved to Sweden in the 1760s, where he died on 4 February 1780.

== See also ==
- Sweden–Turkey relations
- Levant Company
