= Doraha, Sehore =

Doraha
- village
- Location within Madhya Pradesh
- Coordinates: 23°23′12″N 77°9′59″E
- Country: India
- State: Madhya Pradesh
- District: Sehore
- Block: Sehore

Government
- Time zone: UTC+5:30 (IST)
- PIN: 466661
- ISO 3166 code: MP-IN

Doraha is a panchayat village in the Sehore district, Madhya Pradesh, India. The nearest town is Sehore, at 25 km (16 mi).

Dost Mohammad Khan, Nawab of Bhopal acquired the control of Doraha in the early 18th century. After the Battle of Bhopal (1737), a peace treaty was signed between Peshwa Bajirao of Maratha Empire and Jai Singh II of Mughal Empire at Doraha on 7 January 1738.
