= Parason, Bhopal =

Parason
- village
- Location within Madhya Pradesh Location within India
- Coordinates: 23.677351°N 77.177960°E
- Country: India
- State: Madhya Pradesh
- District: Bhopal
- Tehsil: Berasia

Population (2011)
  - Total: 861
- Time zone: UTC+5:30 (IST)
- ISO 3166 code: MP-IN
- Census code: 482097

Parason is a township located in Bhopal district of Madhya Pradesh, India.

== History ==
In the 18th century, Parason was ruled by a Rajput Thakur (chief). He formed an alliance with other Rajput chiefs to counter the growing power of the neighbouring Rajput principality of Mangalgarh. The Mangalgarh was a small principality ruled by a dowager Rani (female ruler), and protected by the mercenary Dost Mohammad Khan. After a prolonged conflict, the two parties agreed to a truce during the Holi festival. However, Khan violated the truce and defeated the Parason Thakur's army, which was in a state of drunken revelry on Holi.

== Demographics ==
According to the 2011 census of India, Parason has 189 households. The effective literacy rate (i.e. the literacy rate of population excluding children aged 6 and below) is 59.01%.

Demographics (2011 Census)
	Total	Male	Female
Population	861	432	429
Children aged below 6 years	151	67	84
Scheduled caste	154	75	79
Scheduled tribe	213	111	102
Literates	419	252	167
Workers (all)	370	226	144
Main workers (total)	368	225	143
Main workers: Cultivators	101	62	39
Main workers: Agricultural labourers	222	125	97
Main workers: Household industry workers	2	2	0
Main workers: Other	43	36	7
Marginal workers (total)	2	1	1
Marginal workers: Cultivators	0	0	0
Marginal workers: Agricultural labourers	1	1	0
Marginal workers: Household industry workers	1	0	1
Marginal workers: Others	0	0	0
Non-workers	491	206	285
