= Manikhedi (census code 482098) =

- village
- Location within Madhya Pradesh Location within India
- Coordinates: 23.655227°N 77.198820°E
- Country: India
- State: Madhya Pradesh
- District: Bhopal
- Tehsil: Berasia

Population (2011)
  - Total: 533
- Time zone: UTC+5:30 (IST)
- ISO 3166 code: IN-MP
- Census code: 482098

Manikhedi is a village in the Bhopal district of Madhya Pradesh, India. It is located in the Berasia tehsil.

It is located near Parason, close to the Narsinghgarh-Berasia road.

== Demographics ==
According to the 2011 census of India, Manikhedi has 111 households. The effective literacy rate (i.e. the literacy rate of population excluding children aged 6 and below) is 52.72%.

Demographics (2011 Census)
	Total	Male	Female
Population	533	258	275
Children aged below 6 years	74	36	38
Scheduled caste	24	13	11
Scheduled tribe	0	0	0
Literates	242	166	76
Workers (all)	308	147	161
Main workers (total)	233	131	102
Main workers: Cultivators	185	106	79
Main workers: Agricultural labourers	32	13	19
Main workers: Household industry workers	2	2	0
Main workers: Other	14	10	4
Marginal workers (total)	75	16	59
Marginal workers: Cultivators	53	11	42
Marginal workers: Agricultural labourers	11	2	9
Marginal workers: Household industry workers	6	3	3
Marginal workers: Others	5	0	5
Non-workers	225	111	114
