= Manikhedi (census code 482297) =

- village
- Location within Madhya Pradesh Location within India
- Coordinates: 23.477186°N 77.361327°E
- Country: India
- State: Madhya Pradesh
- District: Bhopal
- Tehsil: Berasia

Population (2011)
  - Total: 1,265
- Time zone: UTC+5:30 (IST)
- ISO 3166 code: MP-IN
- Census code: 482297

Manikhedi is a village in the Bhopal district of Madhya Pradesh, India. It is located in the Berasia tehsil.

It is located on the road connecting Gunga and Dillod, near the Guna-Bhopal road.

== Demographics ==
According to the 2011 census of India, Manikhedi has 239 households. The effective literacy rate (i.e. the literacy rate of population excluding children aged 6 and below) is 74.79%.

Demographics (2011 Census)
	Total	Male	Female
Population	1265	682	583
Children aged below 6 years	194	96	98
Scheduled caste	261	148	113
Scheduled tribe	0	0	0
Literates	801	491	310
Workers (all)	543	354	189
Main workers (total)	248	197	51
Main workers: Cultivators	187	155	32
Main workers: Agricultural labourers	33	19	14
Main workers: Household industry workers	4	4	0
Main workers: Other	24	19	5
Marginal workers (total)	295	157	138
Marginal workers: Cultivators	26	4	22
Marginal workers: Agricultural labourers	241	131	110
Marginal workers: Household industry workers	3	0	3
Marginal workers: Others	25	22	3
Non-workers	722	328	394
