= Ginnorgarh =

Fort in Madhya Pradesh, India

Coordinates: 22.8410°N 77.5338°E

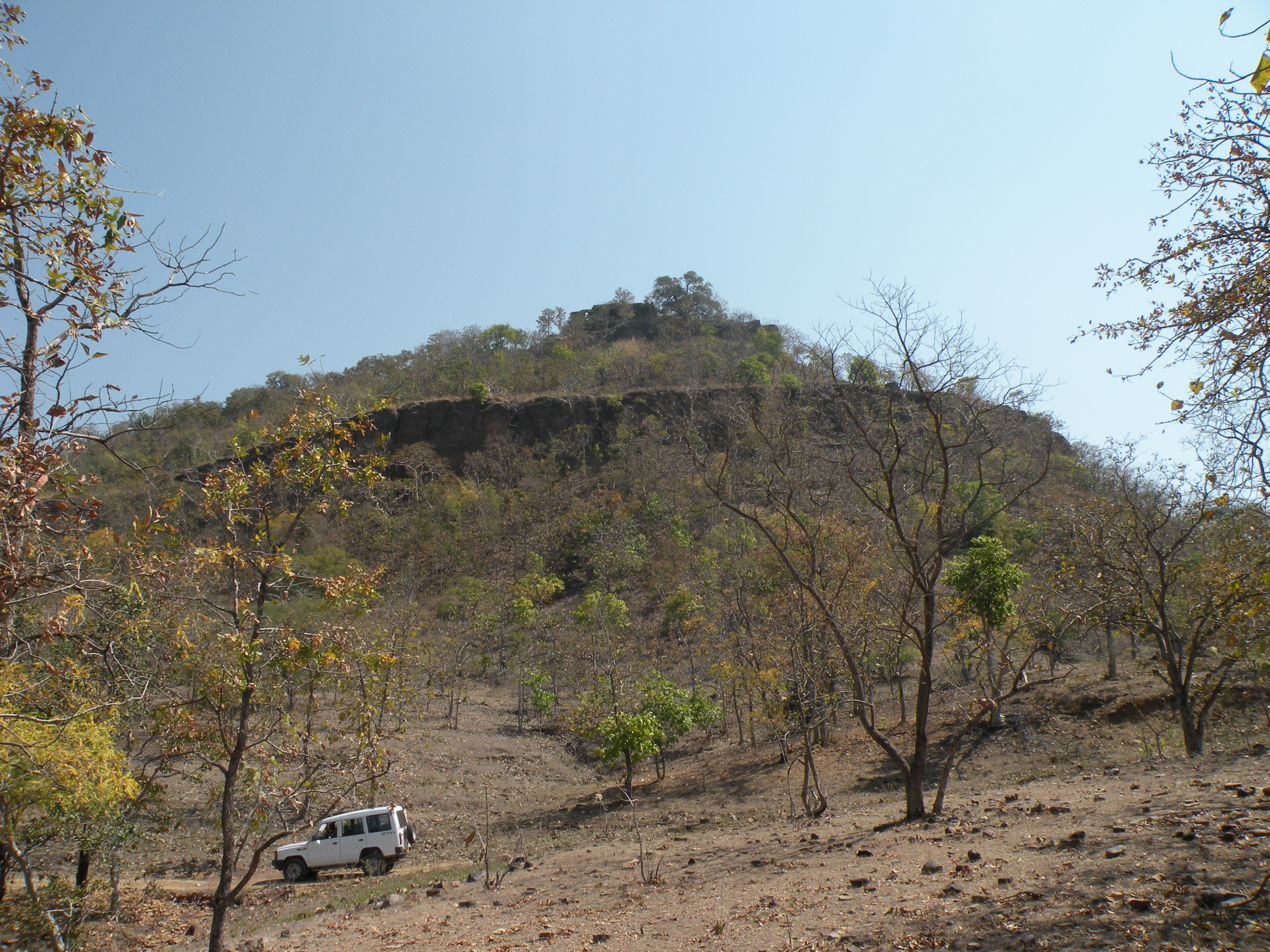
Ginnorgarh fort from the west

Ginnorgarh (or Ginnaurgarh, Hindi गिन्नोर्गढ़) is a fort in Raisen District, Madhya Pradesh. Located in the Ratapani Tiger Reserve on a rocky summit rising to 700m, Ginnorgarh has two natural water bodies and a fortified enclosure with the remains of several palaces, gatehouses and cisterns.

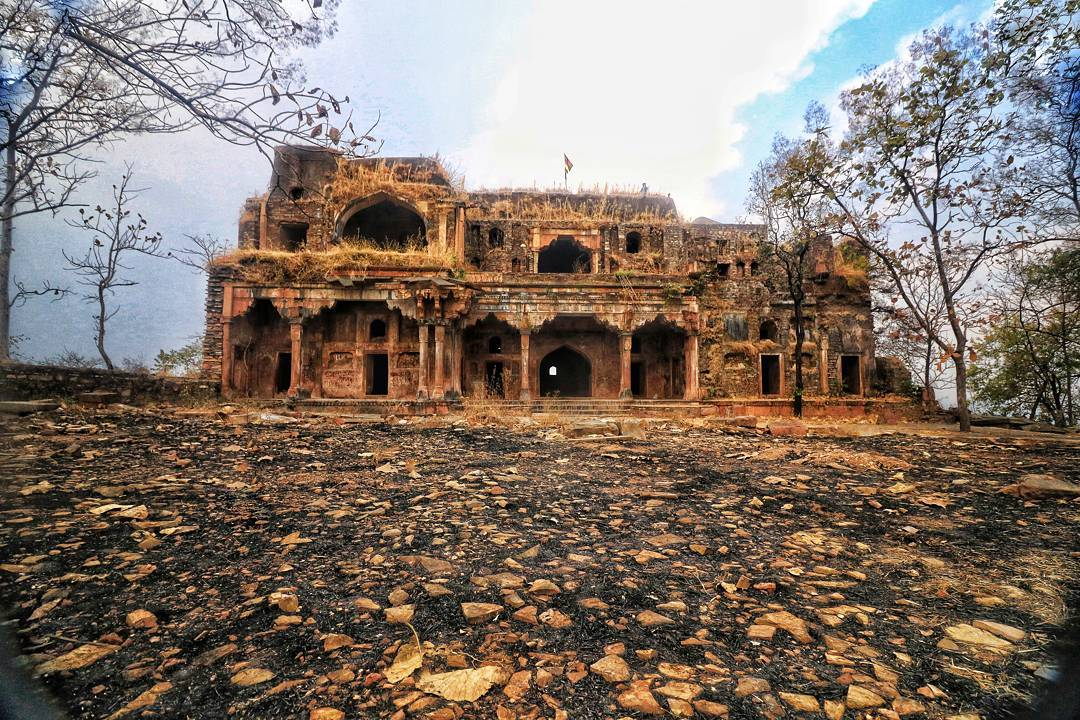
Ginnorgarh, ruins of the main palace

Ginnorgarh was occupied late in the Paramara period, as testified by architectural fragments incorporated into the current structures, but the location first rose to prominence under the Gond rulers. The palace may have been constructed by Nizam Shah, a powerful Gond warlord. The building is one of the gems of Indian palace architecture, close in style to the Kharbuja Mahal at Dhar fort. After Nizam Shah was poisoned by his nephew, the chief of Chainpur Bari, his widow Rani Kamlapati and her son took refuge in the fort. The queen sought protection from Dost Muhammad Khan who became the de facto ruler of the state. With Kamalapati's death in 1723, her son Nawal Shah took charge of the fort. Dost Muhammad Khan then organised an expedition to Ginnorgarh from Bhopal and was able to take the fort by stealth.

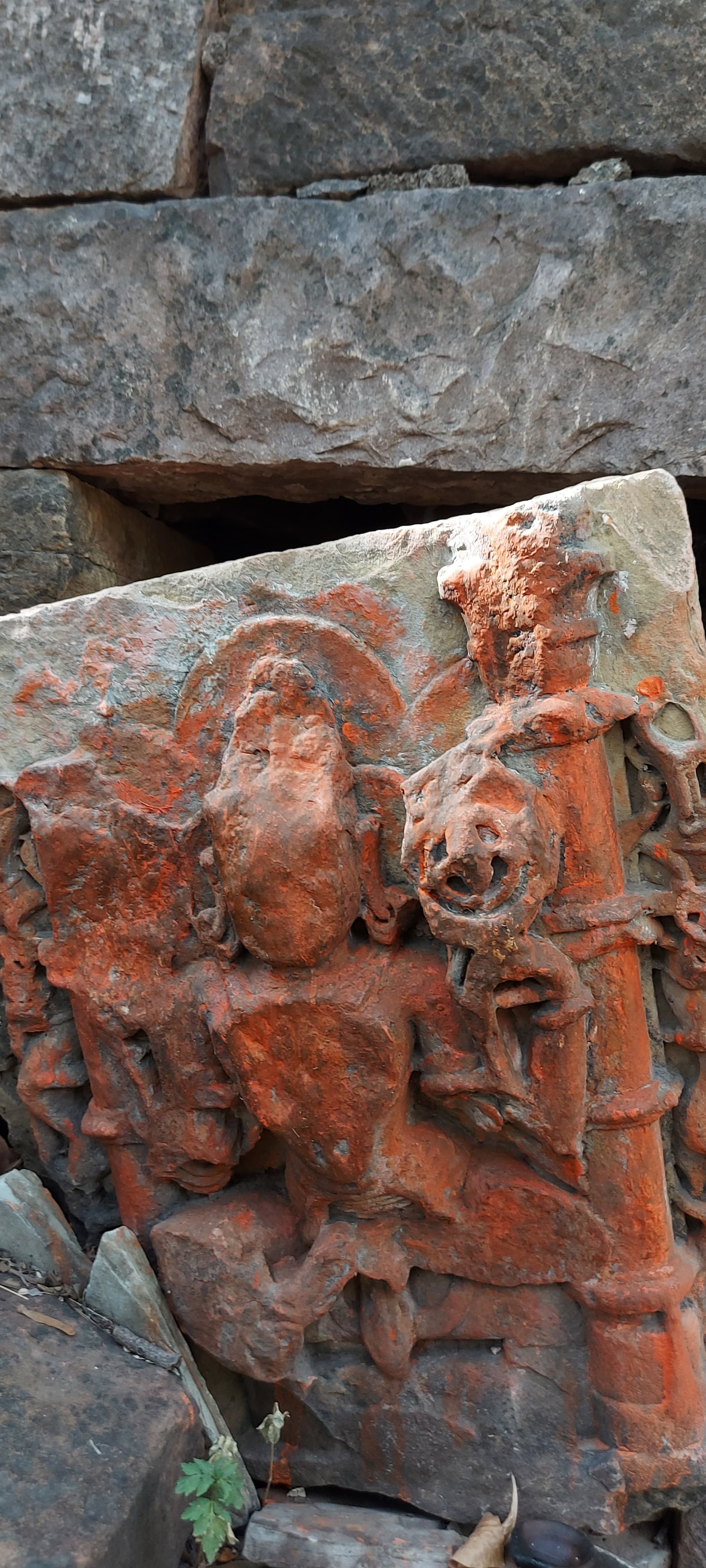
Ruins of a statue near Ginnorgarg Fort

The presence of the rulers of Bhopal at Ginnorgarh is testified by later buildings and an inscription in Persian on one of the gatehouses dated 1725–26. By the early twentieth century, C. E. Luard recorded that the buildings were falling into ruin. Despite being a protected monument under the Department of Archaeology and Museums, Madhya Pradesh, the structures continue to decline and have been vandalised.

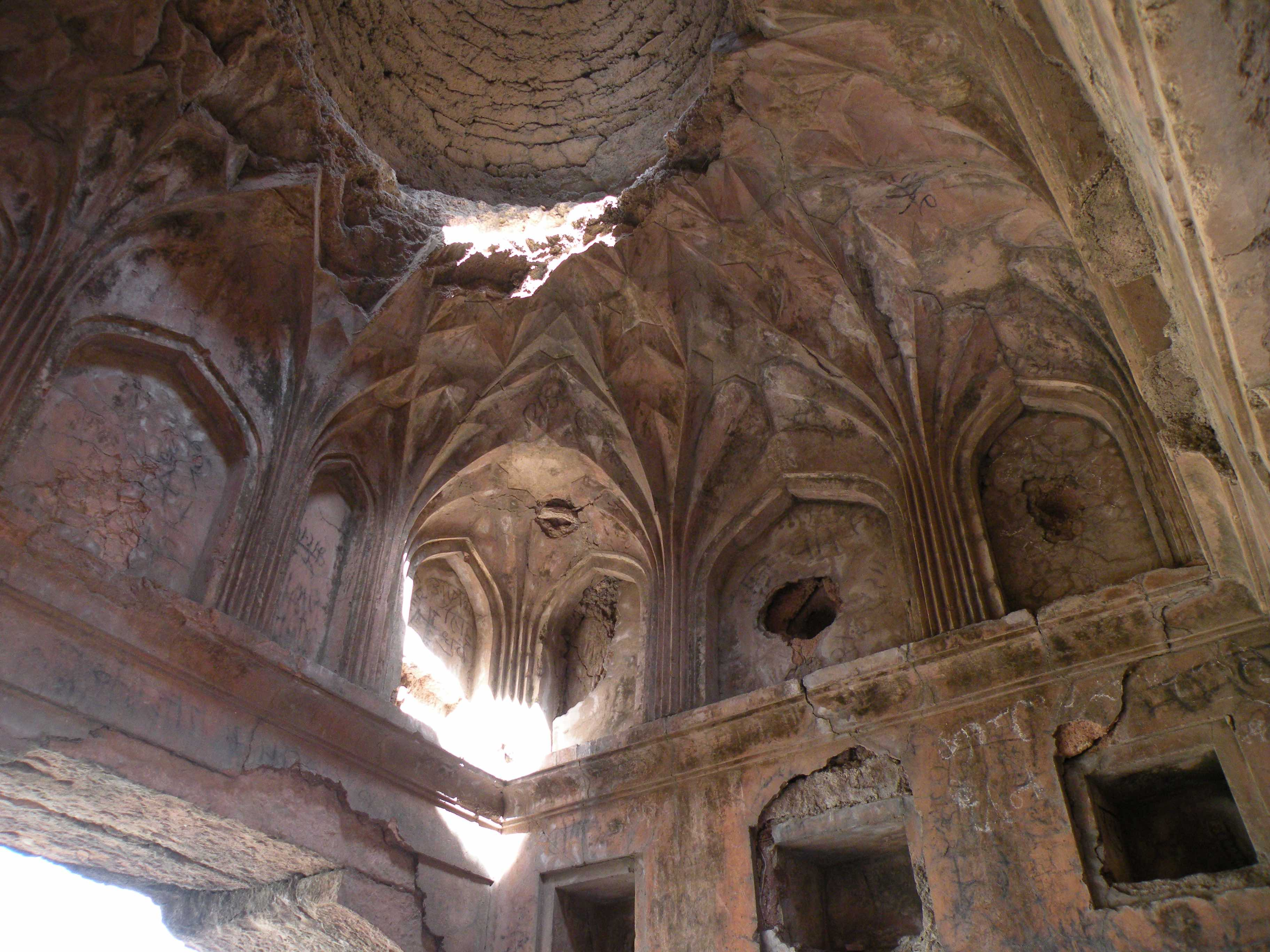
Ginnorgarh, ruined dome with stucco work
