= Battle of Bhopal =

1737 battle between the Maratha Empire and several Mughal vassal states

Coordinates: 23°15′N 77°25′E

Date	24 December 1737
Location	Bhopal, India
Result	Maratha victory: Treaty of Bhopal; Mughals agree to pay 50 lakh rupees as war expenses to the Marathas.
Territorial changes	Mughals cede large territory of Malwa (central India) to Marathas

Belligerents
Maratha Empire	Mughal Vassals; Nizam of Hyderabad; Nawab of Awadh; Nawab of Bhopal

Commanders and leaders
Baji Rao	Yar Muhammad Khan Bahadur; Asaf Jah I Saadat Ali Khan I Sultan Muhammad Khan Bahadur

Strength
80,000	70,000 with 120 cannons drawn by war-elephant corps, 3,000 Camel-drawn Zamburak gunnery

Casualties and losses
Unknown	Unknown

The Battle of Bhopal was fought on 24 December 1737 in Bhopal between the Maratha Empire and the combined army of the Nizam and several Mughal generals.

== Background ==
As the Mughal empire continued to weaken after Aurangzeb's death, the Maratha Peshwa Bajirao I invaded Mughal territories such as Malwa and Gujarat. The Mughal emperor was alarmed by Marathas conquest. In 1737, the Marathas invaded the northern frontiers of the Mughal empire, reaching as far as the outskirts of Delhi, Bajirao defeated a Mughal army there and was marching back to Pune.

The Mughal emperor asked for support from the Nizam. The Nizam intercepted the Marathas during the latter's return journey. The two armies clashed near Bhopal.

== Battle ==
The battle was fought between the Maratha Empire and Mughal forces led by Nizam of Hyderabad near Bhopal in India in December 1737. The Marathas poisoned the water and the replenishment supplies of the besieged Mughal forces. Chimaji was sent with an army of 10,000 men to stop any reinforcements while Bajirao blockaded the city instead of directly attacking the Nizam. The Nizam was forced to sue for peace after he was denied reinforcements from Delhi. The battle resulted in Maratha victory mainly because of the swift tactics of Maratha Peshwa Baji Rao.

== Aftermath ==
Later, on 7 January 1738, a peace treaty was signed between Peshwa Bajirao and Jai Singh II, in Doraha near Bhopal. The Marathas were given the territory of Malwa.
