= Treaty of Bhopal =

1738 treaty between the Maratha Confederacy and Mughal emperor

- Context: Battle of Bhopal
- Signed: 7 January, 1738
- Location: Bhopal, Madhya Pradesh
- Signatories: Peshwa Bajirao I Muhammad Shah; Dost Mohammad Khan
- Parties: Maratha Empire Mughal Empire; Bhopal State
- Languages: Marathi, Persian

The Treaty of Bhopal was an agreement signed in 1738 following the Battle of Bhopal, which took place on December 24, 1737. The battle pitted the Maratha Empire led by Peshwa Bajirao I against a combined force of the Mughals, Nizam of Hyderabad, the Nawab of Oudh, and other Mughal vassals.

== The battle and its aftermath ==
The Battle of Bhopal, occurring on December 24, 1737, pitted the Maratha Confederacy against the combined forces of the Mughals, Rajputs, and Nizams. The Marathas secured a decisive victory, largely attributed to the swift tactics of Bajirao Peshwa. Concerned by the Marathas' growing power, the Mughal Emperor called upon the Nizam to assist in driving them out, but Bajirao defeated him near Bhopal in December 1737, compelling him to agree to Maratha terms. This led to the signing of the humiliating Treaty of Bhopal on January 7, 1738, wherein the Nizam ceded Malwa to the Marathas and the Mughals agreed to pay 5,000,000 as indemnity.

== Terms of the treaty ==
- Mughal concessions: The Mughal Empire agreed to pay a significant financial sum of 5,000,000 rupees to the Marathas as war indemnity.
- Maratha gains: The Maratha Confederacy secured territorial concessions, potentially including the Malwa territories.
- Bhopal's status: The Nawab of Bhopal, Dost Mohammad Khan, who had sided with the Mughals, might have retained his position but became a tributary of the Marathas.
