= Barkheda, Raisen =

Barkheda Barkhera
- village
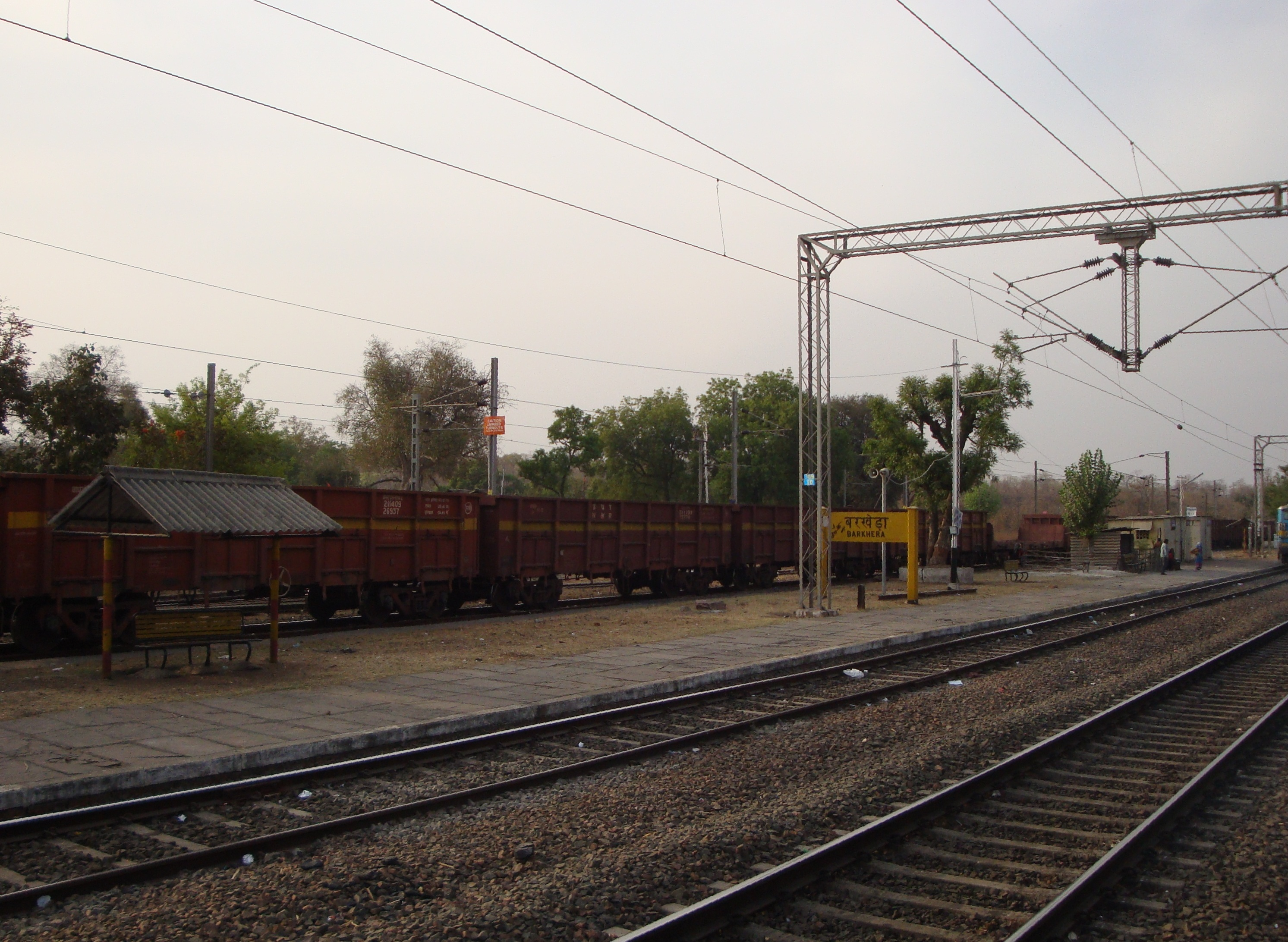
- Barkhera Railway Station

- Location within Madhya Pradesh Location within India
- Coordinates: 22.92°N 77.65°E
- Country: India
- State: Madhya Pradesh
- District: Raisen
- Block: Obedullaganj
- Time zone: UTC+5:30 (IST)
- Postal Index Number: 464995
- STD code: 7480
- ISO 3166 code: MP-IN

Barkheda is a village in the Obedullaganj block of the Raisen District of Madhya Pradesh, India. Alternative English spellings of its name include Bharkada and Barkhera. It is a census-designated place with the code 484296 (2011).

Archaeological excavations at Barkhera have resulted in the history of early historical remains. These include pottery with close affinity to "Malwa ware" and acheulean assemblages similar to the ones found at Bhimbetka. Barkhera has been identified as the source of the raw materials used in some of the monoliths discovered at Bhimbetka. A human skeleton dating to 2nd millennium BCE has also been discovered at Barkheda.

The Betwa River originates near Barkheda.

The village is located along the National Highway 46. It has a railway station, which falls on the Itarsi-Bhopal line.
