= Barkheda, Bhopal =

Barkheda
- Location within Bhopal
- Coordinates: 23°13′9″N 77°28′4″E
- Country: India
- Region: Central India
- Lieutenancy: Madhya Pradesh
- Postal code: 462021
- Postcode area: BHEL
- Dialling code: 0755

Barkheda is a town in BHEL township, Bhopal which is a city in Madhya Pradesh.

== Etymology ==
Barkheda in Hindi means the big ravine.

=== Schools ===
- St. Xavier's Senior Secondary School
