= Mangalgarh, Bhopal =

Mangalgarh मंगलगढ़
- village
- Location within Madhya Pradesh Location within India
- Coordinates: 23°25′N 77°41′E
- Country: India
- State: Madhya Pradesh
- District: Bhopal
- Tehsil: Berasia

Population (2011)
  - Total: 810
- Time zone: UTC+5:30 (IST)
- PIN: 462120
- ISO 3166 code: MP-IN

Mangalgarh is a panchayat village in the Berasia tehsil of Bhopal district, Madhya Pradesh, India.

Mangalgarh was a Rajput principality established in the 17th century by Raja Anand Singh Solanki, a ruler of the Solanki (Chaulukya) dynasty originally from Gujarat. The Solankis of Mangalgarh trace their lineage to the Lunawada Riyasat of Gujarat and belong to the Suryavanshi Rajput clan.

Situated in the Vindhyanchal range, within present-day Berasia tehsil of Bhopal district, Madhya Pradesh, Mangalgarh was known for its fertile lands, strategic location, and the fortified Mangalgarh Fort. The principality maintained alliances with neighbouring Rajput states and was respected for its cavalry and defensive strength. Locally, the region became known as Solankiwada, a reference to its Solanki rulers.

During the British era, the title “Rao Bahadur Raja” was formally recognised in honour of the principality’s service and loyalty. The ruling family has preserved its traditions over the centuries, with the title “Rao Raja” continuing to be held by the head of the royal house.

The present head of the Royal House of Mangalgarh is Rao Raja Saheb Kuldeep Singh Solanki (b. 7 July 1967). His son, Kunwar Saheb Vanshdeep Singh Solanki (b. 23 September 2005), represents the next generation. The family maintains its cultural heritage, with Mangalgarh Fort remaining a visible symbol of their history and legacy.

== Demographics ==
According to the 2011 census of India, Mangalgarh has 180 households. The effective literacy rate (i.e. the literacy rate of population excluding children aged 6 and below) is 61.58%.

Demographics (2011 Census)
	Total	Male	Female
Population	810	403	407
Children aged below 6 years	128	66	62
Scheduled caste	136	66	70
Scheduled tribe	172	92	80
Literates	420	246	174
Workers (all)	352	208	144
Main workers (total)	348	207	141
Main workers: Cultivators	55	43	12
Main workers: Agricultural labourers	253	135	118
Main workers: Household industry workers	5	3	2
Main workers: Other	35	26	9
Marginal workers (total)	4	1	3
Marginal workers: Cultivators	0	0	0
Marginal workers: Agricultural labourers	3	1	2
Marginal workers: Household industry workers	0	0	0
Marginal workers: Others	1	0	1
Non-workers	458	195	263
