= Dillod =

- village
- Location within Madhya Pradesh Location within India
- Coordinates: 23.5020359°N 77.3715614°E
- Country: India
- State: Madhya Pradesh
- District: Bhopal
- Tehsil: Berasia
- Elevation: 483 m (1,585 ft)

Population (2011)
  - Total: 2,507
- Time zone: UTC+5:30 (IST)
- ISO 3166 code: MP-IN
- 2011 census code: 482281

Dillod is a village in the Bhopal district of Madhya Pradesh, India. It is located in the Berasia tehsil.

== Demographics ==
According to the 2011 census of India, Dillod has 534 households. The literacy rate of the village is 67.01%.

Demographics (2011 Census)
	Total	Male	Female
Population	2507	1290	1217
Children aged below 6 years	371	197	174
Scheduled caste	799	421	378
Scheduled tribe	374	196	178
Literates	1680	956	724
Workers (all)	867	637	230
Main workers (total)	634	574	60
Main workers: Cultivators	194	171	23
Main workers: Agricultural labourers	183	175	8
Main workers: Household industry workers	7	7	0
Main workers: Other	250	221	29
Marginal workers (total)	233	63	170
Marginal workers: Cultivators	3	0	3
Marginal workers: Agricultural labourers	170	34	136
Marginal workers: Household industry workers	3	2	1
Marginal workers: Others	57	27	30
Non-workers	1640	653	987
