= 1663 =

1663 in various calendars
- Gregorian calendar: 1663; MDCLXIII
- Ab urbe condita: 2416
- Armenian calendar: 1112; ԹՎ ՌՃԺԲ
- Assyrian calendar: 6413
- Balinese saka calendar: 1584–1585
- Bengali calendar: 1069–1070
- Berber calendar: 2613
- English Regnal year: 14 Cha. 2 – 15 Cha. 2
- Buddhist calendar: 2207
- Burmese calendar: 1025
- Byzantine calendar: 7171–7172
- Chinese calendar: 壬寅年 (Water Tiger); 4360 or 4153 — to — 癸卯年 (Water Rabbit); 4361 or 4154
- Coptic calendar: 1379–1380
- Discordian calendar: 2829
- Ethiopian calendar: 1655–1656
- Hebrew calendar: 5423–5424
- Hindu calendars
- Vikram Samvat: 1719–1720
- Shaka Samvat: 1584–1585
- Kali Yuga: 4763–4764
- Holocene calendar: 11663
- Igbo calendar: 663–664
- Iranian calendar: 1041–1042
- Islamic calendar: 1073–1074
- Japanese calendar: Kanbun 3 (寛文３年)
- Javanese calendar: 1585–1586
- Julian calendar: Gregorian minus 10 days
- Korean calendar: 3996
- Minguo calendar: 249 before ROC 民前249年
- Nanakshahi calendar: 195
- Thai solar calendar: 2205–2206
- Tibetan calendar: ཆུ་ཕོ་སྟག་ལོ་ (male Water-Tiger); 1789 or 1408 or 636 — to — ཆུ་མོ་ཡོས་ལོ་ (female Water-Hare); 1790 or 1409 or 637

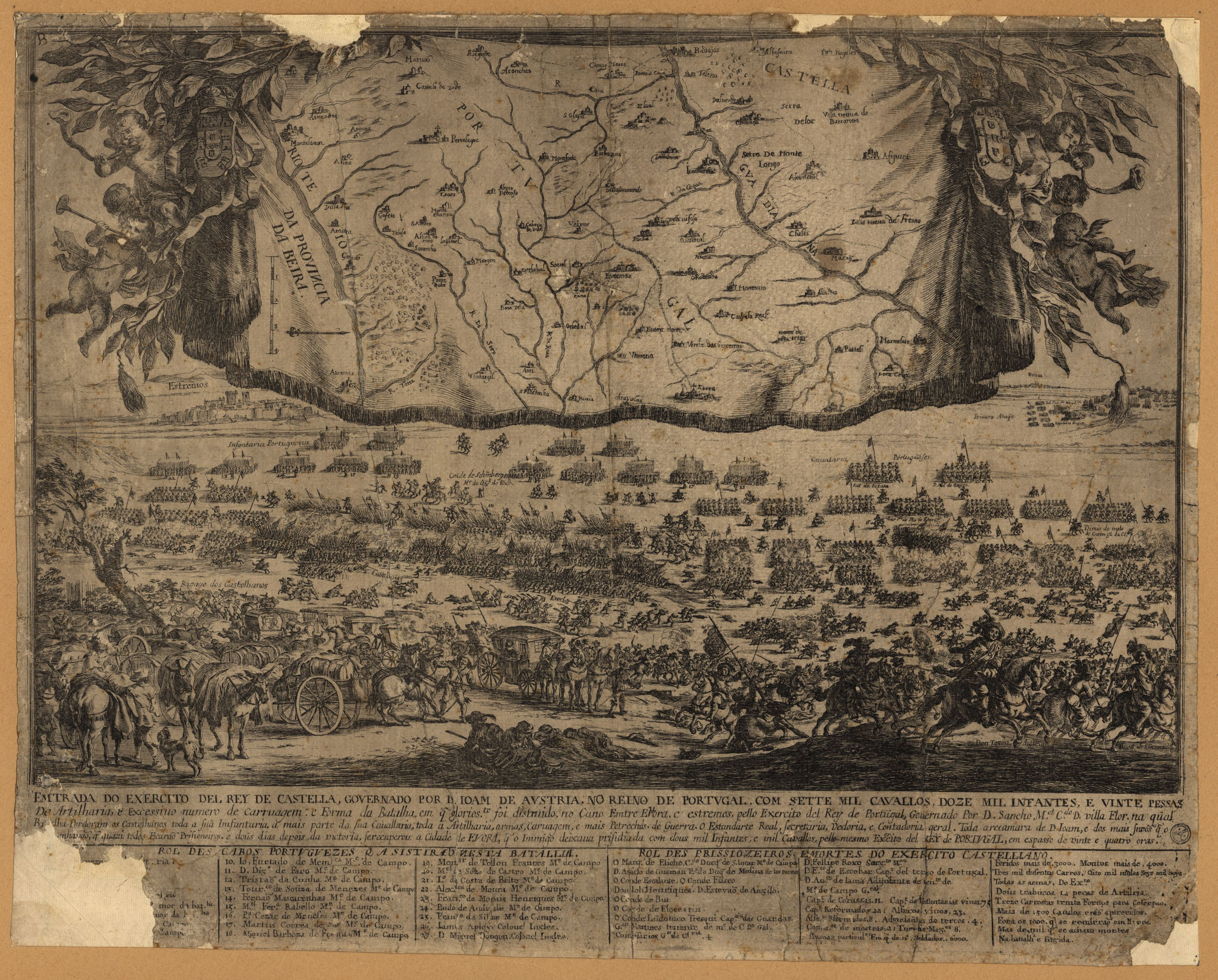
June 8: The Battle of Ameixial takes place between Portugal and Spain

1663 (MDCLXIII) was a common year starting on Monday of the Gregorian calendar and a common year starting on Thursday of the Julian calendar, the 1663rd year of the Common Era (CE) and Anno Domini (AD) designations, the 663rd year of the 2nd millennium, the 63rd year of the 17th century, and the 4th year of the 1660s decade. As of the start of 1663, the Gregorian calendar was 10 days ahead of the Julian calendar, which remained in localized use until 1923.

== Events ==
=== January–March ===
- January 10 – The Royal African Company is granted a Royal Charter by Charles II of England.
- January 23 – The Treaty of Ghilajharighat is signed in India between representatives of the Mughal Empire and the independent Ahom Kingdom (in what is now the Assam state), with the Mughals ending their occupation of the Ahom capital of Garhgaon, in return for payment by Ahom in silver and gold for costs of the occupation, and King Sutamla of Ahom sending one of his daughters to be part of the harem of Mughal Emperor Aurangzeb.
- February 5 – An earthquake estimated at least 7.3 magnitude strikes Canada's Quebec Province.
- February 8 – English pirates led by Christopher Myngs and Edward Mansvelt carry out the sack of Campeche in Mexico, looting the town during a two week occupation that ends on February 23.
- February 10 – The army of the Kingdom of Siam (now Thailand) captures Chiang Mai from the Kingdom of Burma (now Myanmar), using it as a base for launching a larger attack on the Burmese coast in November.
- March 4 – The Prince Edward Islands in the sub-antarctic Indian Ocean are discovered by Barent Barentszoon Lam, of the Dutch ship Maerseveen, and named Dina (Prince Edward) and Maerseveen (Marion).
- March 5 – Emperor Go-Sai's reign ends, and Emperor Reigen ascends to the throne of Japan.
- March 24 – King Charles II of England issues the Charter of Carolina, establishing the Province of Carolina, and dividing it between eight Lords Proprietors.

=== April–June ===
- April 17 – The Ottoman Empire declares war against Leopold I, Holy Roman Emperor, beginning the Austro-Turkish War.
- May 7 – The King's Theatre, now called "Drury Lane", opens in London.
- June 7 – Under the pretext of working out a treaty with Dutch settlers in the colony of New Netherland, the Esopus tribe of the Delaware people enter the fortress at Wiltwijck (now the U.S. city of Kingston, New York) and stage a surprise attack. Unbeknownst to the Wiltwijck residents, another group of Esopus warriors had destroyed the village of Nieu Dorp (now Hurley, New York) earlier in the day. The episode begins the Second Esopus War.
- June 8 – The Portuguese and some English auxiliaries defeat the Spanish Army in the Battle of Ameixial.

=== July–September ===
- July 8 – King Charles II of England grants John Clarke a Royal Charter for the American colony of Rhode Island and Providence Plantations.
- July 19 – Acting as intermediaries between the Dutch and Esopus war parties, a group of three Mohawk Indians obtain the release of the first four hostages who had been taken hostage in the Esopus attack on Wildwyck, two women and two children.
- July 27 – The English Parliament passes the second Navigation Act, requiring that all goods bound for the American colonies have to be sent in English ships from English ports.
- August 15 – Oratam, leader of the Hackensack tribe of the Lenape nation, meets in New Amsterdam (now New York City) with Weswatewchy, Memshe and Wemessamy, three chiefs of the Monsiyok tribe, to ask for the Hackensacks to supply a cannon to defend their fort, and to confirm that the Monsiyok are not allied with the other major division of the Lenape, the Esopus tribe.
- August 21 – Concerned about the wintry weather, the Parliament of England holds an intercessory fast.
- August 28 – In an unseasonably cold summer, severe frost hits England.

1663 flag of Sweden

- September 5 – Dutch Captain Martin Kregier and Lieutenant Couwenhoven lead an attack against the Esopus Indians from the right and Lieutenant Stilwil and Ensign Niessen the left wing. In the battle, near what is now Mamakating, New York, Chief Papequanaehen and 14 other Esopus warriors are killed, along with seven civilians; three Dutch soldiers are killed, but 23 Dutch prisoners are rescued.
- September 8 – Diego de Salcedo becomes the new Spanish Governor-General of the Philippines, replacing Sabiniano Manrique de Lara, who had served for more than 10 years. Salcedo is overthrown in 1668.
- September 13
  - The Gloucester County Conspiracy, the first slave rebellion in British North America, is foiled after one of the plotters, John Birkenhead, reveals the plan of African slaves and English indentured servants to kill their masters. Birkenhead is freed by his master as a reward for betraying the rebels.
  - After a siege of more than a month, the Hungarian fortress at Érsekújvár (now Nové Zámky in Slovakia) surrenders to the Ottoman Empire. In accordance with the treaty of surrender negotiated by the Hungarian commander, Count Ádám Forgách, the European residents are allowed free passage to Austria, and the Ottoman Grand Vizier, Fazil Ahmed Pasha provides a document certifying that the fort's defenders fought bravely.

=== October–December ===
- October 12 – The Farnley Wood Plot, a conspiracy in the English county of West Yorkshire to overthrow the recently-restored monarchy and to return to the military rule that had been established by the late Oliver Cromwell, fails when only 26 men gather at Farnley. The group is arrested and 21 of the rebels are later executed for treason.
- October 16 – With 2,000 men under his command, Petar Zrinski, the Viceroy of Croatia within the Holy Roman Empire, defeats a much larger force of 8,000 Ottoman soldiers in the Battle at Jurjeve Stijene, near the modern town of Otočac. The Croatians lose 10 soldiers killed; the Ottoman invasion force suffers over 1,500 deaths.
- November 6 – The Kingdom of Sweden adopts a law creating the flag in use in the nation now, a yellow Nordic cross on a blue background. The original version, used as a state flag and on ships, had three pennants.
- November 19 – Alexandre de Prouville de Tracy is appointed by King Louis XIV of Frances as the new Governor General of the French West Indies as the colonies of Saint-Domingue, Saint Martin, Guadeloupe, Dominica, Saint Barthélemy, and Saint Croix are put under a unified rule for the colonies in the Caribbean Sea for the first time since 1651.
- November 24 – The General Court of Commissioners for Rhode Island and Providence Plantations convenes for the final time, meeting in Newport to formally receive the Rhode Island Royal Charter issued on July 8 by King Charles II.
- December 12 – The Dutch Republic prohibits practice of the common law custom of jus naufragii, the doctrine that permitted people to seize property that had washed ashore on their land after a shipwreck.
- December 17 – Queen Ana Nzinga of the Kingdom of Ndongo and the Kingdom of Matamba, both located in the northern part of what is now the Republic of Angola in Africa, dies after a 39-year reign in Ndongo and 32 years after conquering Matamba. She is succeeded by her sister, Barbara Mukambu Mbandi, who rules for less than three years.
- December 27 – Jacob Hustaert becomes the new Governor of Dutch Ceylon.

=== Date unknown ===
- The Prix de Rome scholarship is established in France for students of the arts.
- The first Maroon community arises in Suriname.
- Robert Hooke discovers that cork is made of "tiny little rooms", which he first calls "Cells".
- Publication at Cambridge in the Massachusetts Bay Colony of the "Eliot Indian Bible" (Mamusse Wunneetupanatamwe Up-Biblum God), which becomes the first complete Bible published in the Americas, a translation by English-born Puritan missionary John Eliot of the Geneva Bible, from English into the Massachusett language (Natic or Wômpanâak) variety of the Algonquian languages.
- Baruch Spinoza publishes Principia philosophiae cartesianae, which is the only book he would publish under his name, in his life.

== Births ==
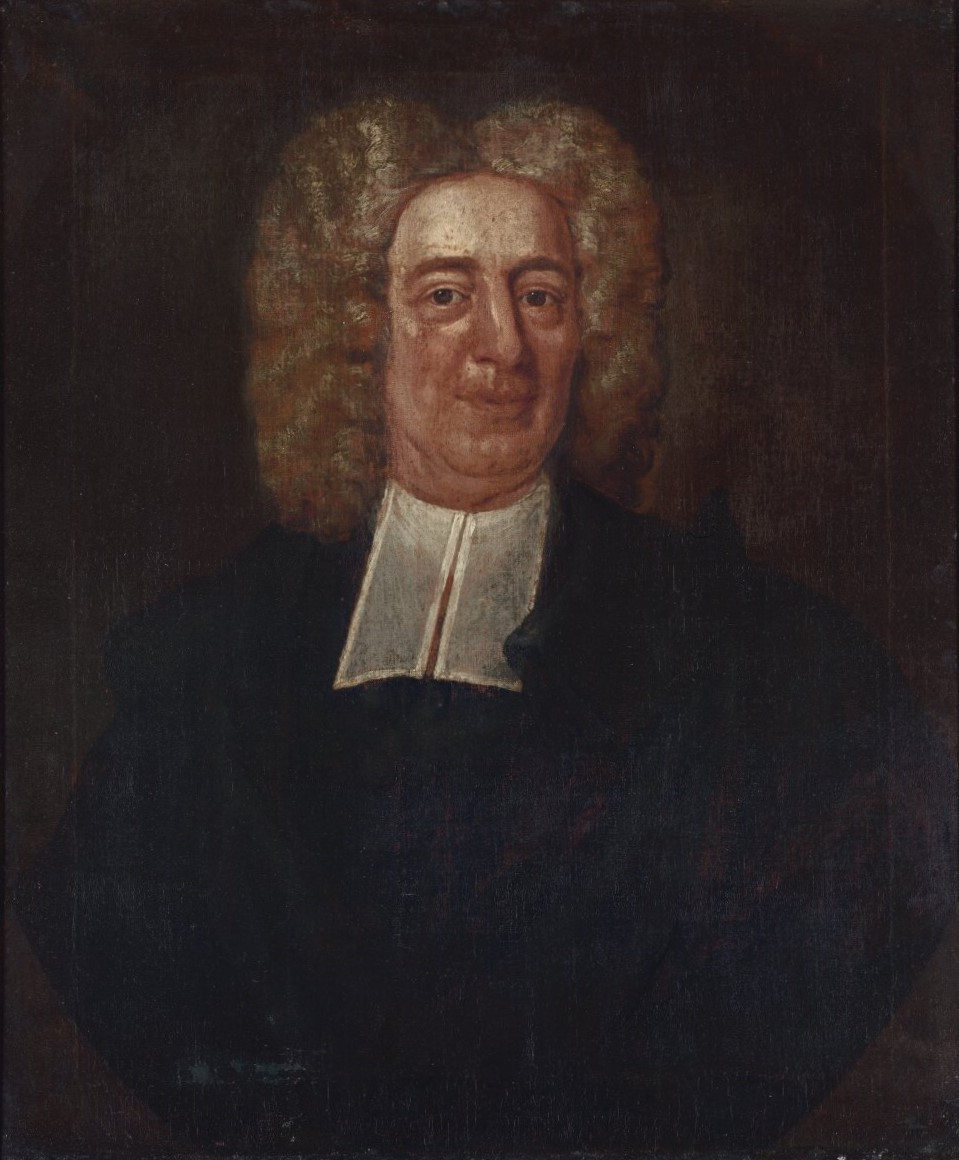
Cotton Mather

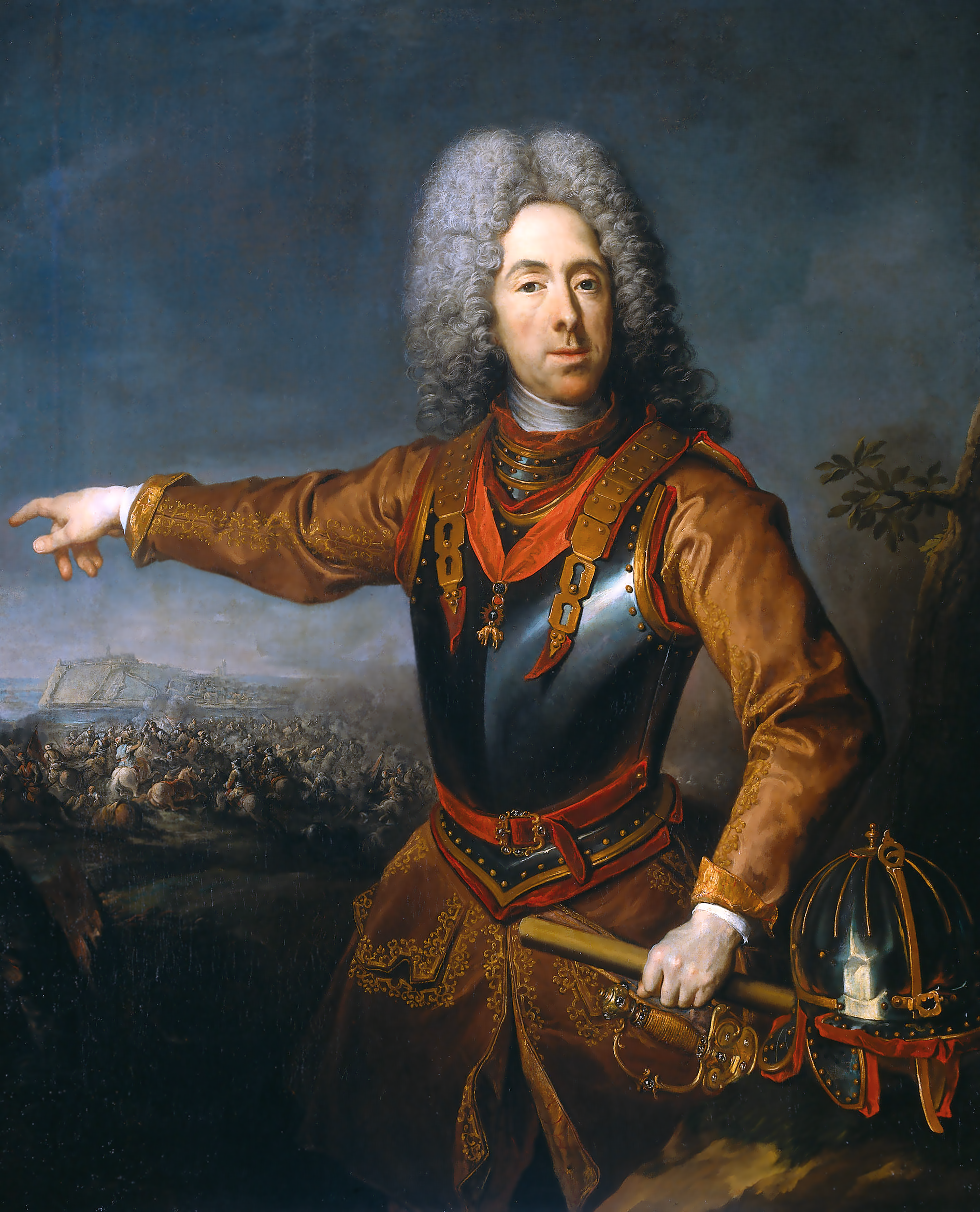
Prince Eugene of Savoy

- January 13 – Henry Paget, 1st Earl of Uxbridge, British politician (d. 1743)
- January 19 – Nicholas Trott, colonial magistrate, South Carolina Chief Justice (d. 1740)
- January 20 – Luca Carlevarijs, Italian painter (d. 1730)
- January 26 – Francis Barrell, English politician (d. 1724)
- January 27 – George Byng, 1st Viscount Torrington, English Royal Navy admiral (d. 1733)
- February 1 – Ignacia del Espíritu Santo, Filipino religious sister (d. 1748)
- February 4 – Edward Lee, 1st Earl of Lichfield, English peer (d. 1716)
- February 12 – Cotton Mather, American theologian (d. 1728)
- February 22 – Louis Bossuet, French parlementaire (d. 1742)
- February 25 – Pierre Antoine Motteux, French-born English dramatist (d. 1718)
- March 3 – Nicolas Siret, French composer, organist and harpsichordist (d. 1754)
- March 6 – Francis Atterbury, British bishop (d. 1732)
- March 7 – Tomaso Antonio Vitali, Italian composer and violinist (d. 1745)
- March 16 – Jean-Baptiste Matho, French composer (d. 1743)
- March 18 – Johann Martin Steindorff, German composer (d. 1744)
- March 22 – August Hermann Francke, German Lutheran clergyman, philanthropist, Biblical scholar (d. 1727)
- March 25 – Félix Le Pelletier de La Houssaye (d. 1723)
- March 27 – Johann Andreas Eisenbarth, German surgeon (d. 1727)
- March 28 – Louis Crato, Count of Nassau-Saarbrücken (d. 1713)
- March 29 – Harry Mordaunt, British politician (d. 1720)
- April 7 – Filippo II Colonna, Italian noble (d. 1714)
- April 10 – Francisco de Berganza, Italian Benedictine monk (d. 1738)
- April 14 – August David zu Sayn-Wittgenstein-Hohenstein, Prussian politician (d. 1735)
- April 16 – Alexander Sigismund von der Pfalz-Neuburg, German Catholic bishop (d. 1737)
- May 1 – Giacomo Parolini, Italian painter (d. 1733)
- May 2 – Joseph de Gallifet, French Jesuit priest (d. 1749)
- May 8 – Lord James Murray, Scottish Member of Parliament (d. 1719)
- May 17
  - Rosine Elisabeth Menthe, morganatic wife of Duke Rudolf August of Brunswick-Wolfenbüttel (d. 1701)
  - Sir William Glynne, 2nd Baronet, English politician (d. 1721)
- May 20 – William Bradford, English-born printer in North America (d. 1752)
- May 25 – Johann Dientzenhofer, German architect (d. 1726)
- May 28 – António Manoel de Vilhena, Portuguese Grand Master of the Order of Saint John (d. 1736)
- June 2 – Anne-Marguerite Petit du Noyer, French journalist (d. 1719)
- June 8 – Sir William Lowther, 1st Baronet, of Swillington, British politician (d. 1729)
- June 24 – Jean Baptiste Massillon, French Catholic bishop, famous preacher (d. 1742)
- July 1 – Franz Xaver Murschhauser, German composer and theorist (d. 1738)
- July 11 – James Stuart, Duke of Cambridge, British prince (d. 1667)
- July 15 – Sir John Cropley, 2nd Baronet, English politician (d. 1713)
- July 26 – Peter Hohmann, Edler of Hohenthal, Leipzig merchant and town councillor, raised to nobility (d. 1732)
- August 9 – Ferdinando de' Medici, Grand Prince of Tuscany (d. 1713)
- August 18 – Catherine Repond, alleged Swiss witch (d. 1731)
- August 24 – Kiliaen Van Rensselaer, fifth patroon in New Netherland (d. 1719)
- August 31 – Guillaume Amontons, French scientific instrument inventor and physicist (d. 1705)
- September 1 – Jean Boivin the Younger, French writer (d. 1726)
- September 16 – Johann Josua Mosengel, German organ builder (d. 1731)
- September 20
  - Pirro Albergati, Italian composer (d. 1735)
  - Frederick William, Prince of Hohenzollern-Hechingen (d. 1735)
  - Louis-François Duplessis de Mornay, Catholic bishop of Quebec (d. 1741)
- September 25 – Johann Nikolaus Hanff, German composer and organist (d. 1711)
- September 28 – Henry FitzRoy, 1st Duke of Grafton (d. 1690)
- October 3 – Johann Christoph Wichmannshausen, German philosopher (d. 1727)
- October 9
  - Francis Xavier Schmalzgrueber, German canon law jurist (d. 1735)
  - Giovanni Mario Crescimbeni, Italian critic and poet (d. 1728)
- October 15 – Fitton Gerard, 3rd Earl of Macclesfield, English politician, earl (d. 1702)
- October 17 – Diego de Astorga y Céspedes, Spanish Catholic cardinal (d. 1734)
- October 18 – Prince Eugene of Savoy, Austrian field marshal (d. 1736)
- October 23 – Margravine Eleonore Juliane of Brandenburg-Ansbach, duchess by marriage of Württemberg-Winnental (d. 1724)
- October 24 – Stephen Delancey, major colonial New York figure (d. 1741)
- November 13 – Árni Magnússon, Icelandic scholar and manuscript collector (d. 1730)
- November 14 – Friedrich Wilhelm Zachow, German composer (d. 1712)
- November 17 – Marie Christine de Pardaillan de Gondrin, eldest legitimate child of Françoise-Athénaïs (d. 1675)
- November 25 – Jean-Frédéric Osterwald, Swiss Protestant pastor (d. 1747)
- November 29 – Sir Thomas Crosse, 1st Baronet, British aristocrat, politician (d. 1738)
- November 30 – Andrea Adami da Bolsena, Italian castrato (d. 1742)
- December 8 – Nathan Gold, deputy colonial governor of Connecticut (d. 1723)
- December 20 – Thomas Wilson, Bishop of Sodor and Man (d. 1755)
- December 24 – Ippolita Ludovisi, Princess of Piombino (1701 until her death) (d. 1733)
- December 27 – Johann Melchior Roos, German painter (d. 1731)
- December 31 – Carl Wilhelm Welser von Neunhof, German merchant, politician (d. 1711)
- Date unknown –
  - William King, English poet (d. 1712)
  - Delarivier Manley, English author (d. 1724)
  - Antonio Zucchelli, Italian Franciscan capuchin friar, explorer and missionary (d. 1716)

== Deaths ==
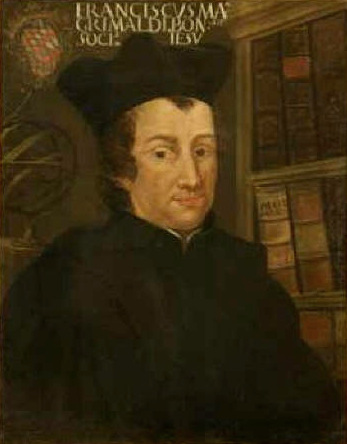
Francesco Maria Grimaldi

- January 2 – Illiam Dhone, Manx politician (b. 1608)
- January 6 – George Goring, 1st Earl of Norwich, English soldier, politician (b. 1585)
- January 22 – Giancarlo de' Medici, Italian Catholic cardinal (b. 1611)
- January 29 – Robert Sanderson, English theologian and casuist (b. 1587)
- January 31 – John Spelman, English politician (b. 1606)
- February 19 – Adam Adami, German bishop, diplomat (b. 1603)
- March 13 – Edward, Count Palatine of Simmern (b. 1625)
- March 17 – Jerome Weston, 2nd Earl of Portland, English diplomat and landowner (b. 1605)
- March 20 – Biagio Marini, Italian violinist and composer (b. 1594)
- April 5 – John Norton, American divine (b. 1606)
- April 7 – Francis Cooke, English Mayflower Pilgrim (b. c. 1583)
- April 17 – David Questiers, Dutch poet (b. 1623)
- April 20 – Kjeld Stub, Danish priest (b. 1607)
- April 29 – Margaret Yolande of Savoy, duchess consort of Parma (b. 1635)
- May 3 – Johan Björnsson Printz, governor of New Sweden (b. 1592)
- May 6 – Johan van Rensselaer, Dutch noble (b. 1625)
- May 11 – Henri II d'Orléans, Duke of Longueville, Prince of France (b. 1595)
- March 20 – Selius Marselis, Dutch/Norwegian tradesman (b. 1600)
- May 30 – Jean Guyon, French colonist (b. 1592)
- June 4 – William Juxon, Archbishop of Canterbury (b. 1582)
- June 5 – Béatrix de Cusance, Frenc-Comtois noble woman (b. 1614)
- June 20 – Catherine Henriette de Bourbon, French noble (b. 1596)
- June 25 – John Bramhall, Archbishop of Armagh, Anglican controversialist (b. 1594)
- June 26 – John Alleyn, Cornish barrister (b. 1621)
- July 2 – Thomas Selle, German baroque composer (b. 1599)
- July 5 – Samuel Newman, colonial Massachusetts clergyman (b. 1602)
- July 7 – Thomas Baltzar, German violinist (b. c. 1631)
- July 13 – Sir Thomas Myddelton, 1st Baronet, English politician (b. 1624)
- July 16 – William VI, Landgrave of Hesse-Kassel (1637–1663) (b. 1629)
- July 20 – Samuel Stone, Connecticut Puritan minister (b. 1602)
- August 10 – Edward Convers, American settler (b. 1590)
- August 26 – Sir John Yonge, 1st Baronet, English politician (b. 1603)
- September 18 – Joseph of Cupertino, Italian saint (b. 1603)
- September 20 – Thomas Stucley (MP), English politician (b. 1620)
- September 27
  - Christoffer Urne, Governor General of Norway (b. 1593)
  - Philip, Duke of Schleswig-Holstein-Sonderburg-Glücksburg (b. 1584)
- October 7 – Sophia Eleonore of Hesse-Darmstadt, Landgravine consort of Hesse-Homburg (b. 1634)
- October 13 – Susanna Margarete of Anhalt-Dessau, Princess of Anhalt-Dessau (b. 1610)
- October 20 – Raphael Cotoner, Spanish 60th Grandmaster of the Knights Hospitaller (b. 1601)
- October 31 – Théophile Raynaud, French theologian (b. 1583)
- November 24 – Louis IV of Legnica, Duke of Oława and Brzeg (b. 1616)
- December 5 – Severo Bonini, Italian composer (b. 1582)
- December 17 – Queen Nzinga of Ndongo and Matamba (b. c. 1583)
- December 21
  - Camillo Astalli, Italian cardinal (b. 1616)
  - Thomas Bruce, 1st Earl of Elgin, Scottish nobleman (b. 1599)
- December 27 – Christine of France, Duchess of Savoy (b. 1606)
- December 28 – Francesco Maria Grimaldi, Italian mathematician, physicist (b. 1618)
- date unknown – Chiara Varotari, Italian Baroque painter (b. 1584)
- date unknown – Bihari Lal, Indian Poet (b. 1595)
