= 1732 =

1732 in various calendars
- Gregorian calendar: 1732; MDCCXXXII
- Ab urbe condita: 2485
- Armenian calendar: 1181; ԹՎ ՌՃՁԱ
- Assyrian calendar: 6482
- Balinese saka calendar: 1653–1654
- Bengali calendar: 1138–1139
- Berber calendar: 2682
- British Regnal year: 5 Geo. 2 – 6 Geo. 2
- Buddhist calendar: 2276
- Burmese calendar: 1094
- Byzantine calendar: 7240–7241
- Chinese calendar: 辛亥年 (Metal Pig); 4429 or 4222 — to — 壬子年 (Water Rat); 4430 or 4223
- Coptic calendar: 1448–1449
- Discordian calendar: 2898
- Ethiopian calendar: 1724–1725
- Hebrew calendar: 5492–5493
- Hindu calendars
- Vikram Samvat: 1788–1789
- Shaka Samvat: 1653–1654
- Kali Yuga: 4832–4833
- Holocene calendar: 11732
- Igbo calendar: 732–733
- Iranian calendar: 1110–1111
- Islamic calendar: 1144–1145
- Japanese calendar: Kyōhō 17 (享保１７年)
- Javanese calendar: 1656–1657
- Julian calendar: Gregorian minus 11 days
- Korean calendar: 4065
- Minguo calendar: 180 before ROC 民前180年
- Nanakshahi calendar: 264
- Thai solar calendar: 2274–2275
- Tibetan calendar: ལྕགས་མོ་ཕག་ལོ་ (female Iron-Boar); 1858 or 1477 or 705 — to — ཆུ་ཕོ་བྱི་བ་ལོ་ (male Water-Rat); 1859 or 1478 or 706

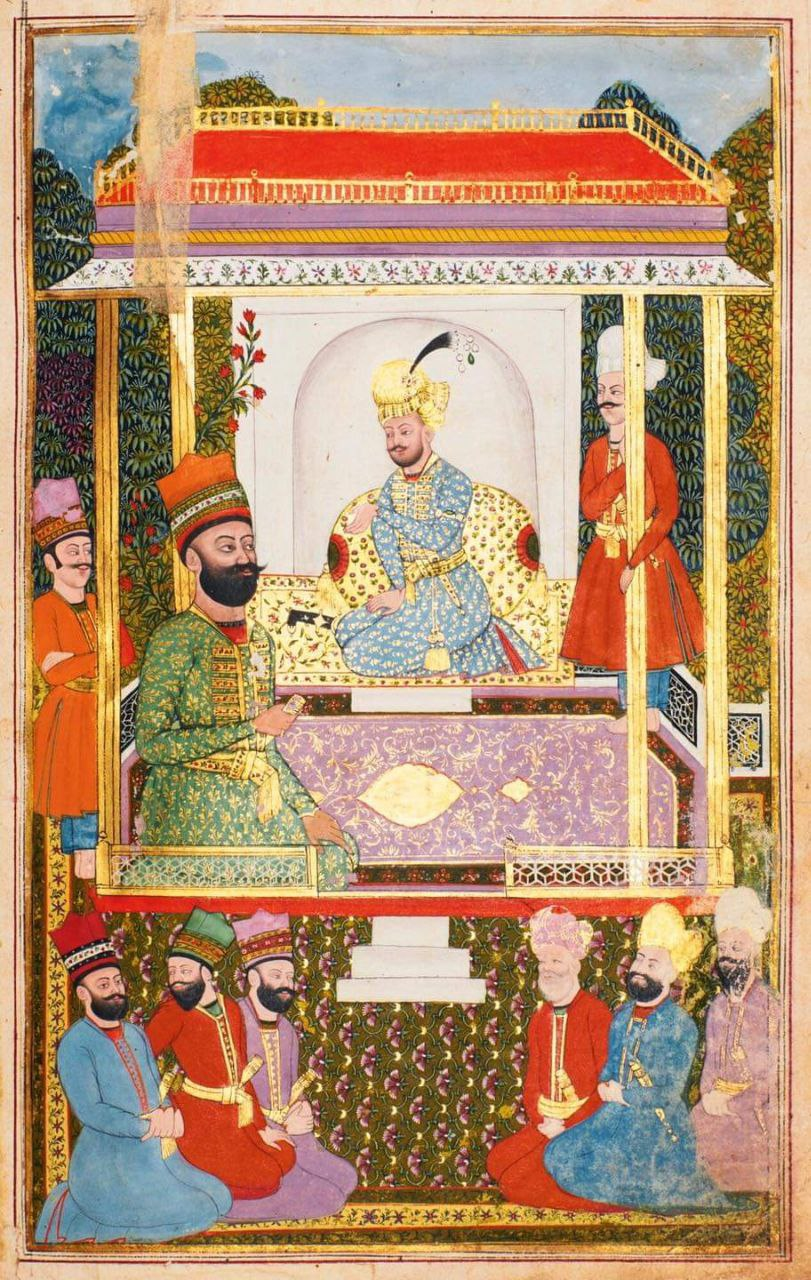
April 16: Shah Tahmasp II of Persia is overthrown by General Nadir Khan.

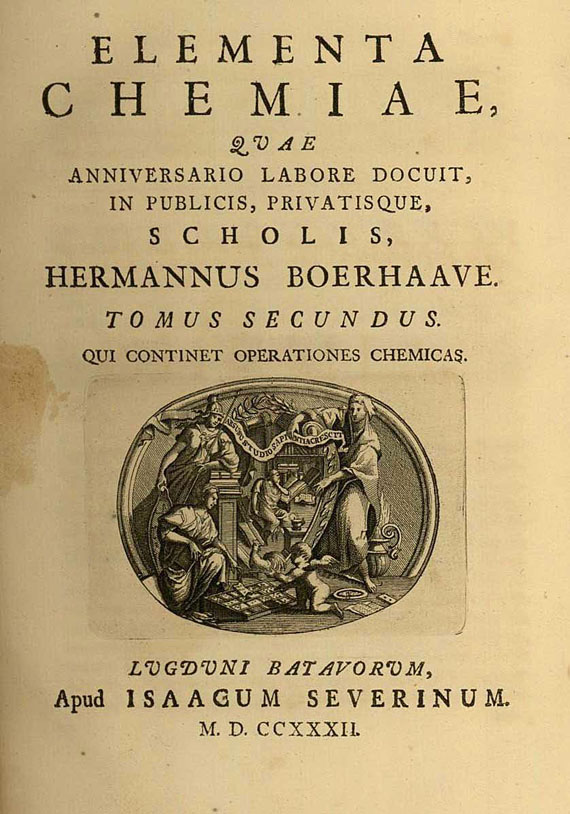
Herman Boerhaave publishes Elementa chemiae, considered the first text on chemistry.

1732 (MDCCXXXII) was a leap year starting on Tuesday of the Gregorian calendar and a leap year starting on Saturday of the Julian calendar, the 1732nd year of the Common Era (CE) and Anno Domini (AD) designations, the 732nd year of the 2nd millennium, the 32nd year of the 18th century, and the 3rd year of the 1730s decade. As of the start of 1732, the Gregorian calendar was 11 days ahead of the Julian calendar, which remained in localized use until 1923.

== Events ==
=== January–March ===
- January 21 – Russia and Persia sign the Treaty of Riascha at Resht. Based on the terms of the agreement, Russia will no longer establish claims over Persian territories.
- February 9 – The Swedish East India Company begins its profitable first expedition to China, departing Gothenburg on the ship Friedericus Rex Sueciae under the command of Colin Campbell.
- February 14 – Henry Fielding's comedy The Modern Husband premieres at the Royal Theatre on Drury Lane in London.
- February 25 – John Stackhouse is appointed by the British East India Company as the new President of the Bengal Presidency and serves for seven years.
- February 27 – Herat Campaign: General Nader Shah of Persia (now Iran) suppresses the rebellion by Zulfiqar Khan in the city of Herat in what is now Afghanistan.
- March 19 – Chamaraja Wodeyar VII becomes the new Maharaja of the Kingdom of Mysore in Southern India, now the state of Karnataka and parts of Tamil Nadu and Andhra Pradesh.
- March 3 – English Captain Charles Gough rediscovers Gough Island in the South Atlantic.
- March 30 – MPs John Birch and Denis Bond are expelled from the House of Commons of Great Britain after using their positions on the Commission for Forfeited Lands to make fraudulent sales.

=== April–June ===
- April 12 – King Christian VI of Denmark-Norway signs the charter for the new Danish Asia Company (Dansk Asiatisk Kompagni), granting it a 40-year monopoly on Denmark-Norway's trade in Asia, leading to the creation of Danish India and cities of Trankebar (now Tharangambadi in Tamil Nadu), Frederiknagore (now Serampore in West Bengal) and the Frederiksøerne Islands (now the Nicobar Islands).
- April 16 – After his disastrous attempt to fight the Ottoman Empire, Shah Tahmasp II is removed from the throne of Iran by one of his generals, Nader Khan, who later proclaims himself the King of Persia in Tahmasp's place as Nader Shah.
- May 10 – Representatives of the heirs of William Penn and of Lord Baltimore, the respective owners of most of the land in the Province of Pennsylvania and the Province of Maryland set out the boundary between the two future U.S. states after a survey determines that Philadelphia is located on the Maryland side of the border. The dispute eventually leads to a lawsuit and the eventual survey by Charles Mason and Jeremiah Dixon to determine the Mason–Dixon line.
- May 13 – Rebels in Corsica agree to allow the Republic of Genoa to resume its administration of the island in return for amnesty and promised reforms.
- May 28 – Dirck van Cloon becomes the new Governor-General of the Dutch East Indies (now Indonesia).
- June 9 – James Oglethorpe is granted a royal charter for the colony of Georgia.

=== July–September ===
- July 2 – Spain completes the conquest of the Algerian cities of Oran and Mers El Kébir in the Oran Province, after a 17-day siege.
- August 16 – The Order of Malta under the command of Jacques-François de Chambray defeats a convoy of the Ottoman Empire and frees 14 Christian slaves, following the naval battle of Damietta.
- August 21 – Mikhail Gvozdev in the Sviatoi Gavriil makes the first known crossing of the Bering Strait, from Cape Dezhnev to Cape Prince of Wales in Alaska, marking the first time that Europeans have reached the northwest coast of North America.
- September 13 – The Treaty of the Three Black Eagles or the Treaty of Berlin, a secret treaty between the Austrian Empire, the Russian Empire and Prussia against the Polish–Lithuanian Commonwealth.
- September 16
  - The magnitude 5.8 Montreal earthquake occurs in Quebec (New France).
  - A military warehouse explosion kills up to two-thirds of the population of Campo Maior, Portugal.

=== October–December ===
- October 7 – French Army Lieutenant General Florent-Jean de Vallière is tasked by King Louis XV to improve France's method of forging cannons.
- October 16 – Russia approves the second Kamchatka expedition of Danish-born Russian cartographer Vitus Bering, and the Admiralty orders him to sail east and try to claim uncharted lands in North America.
- November 29 – The magnitude 6.6 Irpinia earthquake causes 1,940 deaths in the former Kingdom of Naples.
- December 5 – 139 members of the Parlement of Paris, exiled by order of King Louis XV, secure their recall.
- December 7 – The original Theatre Royal, Covent Garden, London (the modern-day Royal Opera House) is opened.
- December 19 – Benjamin Franklin, in the Pennsylvania Gazette, first advertises the publication of Poor Richard's Almanack, purportedly written by "Richard Saunders", a pen name used by Franklin. The book goes on sale on December 28. The annual publication will continue until 1758.

=== Date unknown ===
- Herman Boerhaave publishes the authorized edition of his Elementa chemiae, recognised as the first text on chemistry.
- The world's first lightship is moored at the Nore, in the Thames Estuary of England.
- This year's General Assembly of the Church of Scotland gives rise to the First Secession of 1733.
- The Portsmouth Grammar School is founded in England under the will of Dr. William Smith, a physician and former Mayor of Portsmouth, by Christ Church, Oxford.

== Births ==
- January – Abbas III, Shah of Persia (d. 1740)
- January 17 – Stanisław August Poniatowski, last King of Poland and Grand Duke of Lithuania (d. 1798)
- January 20 – Richard Henry Lee, 12th President of the Continental Congress (d. 1794)
- January 24 – Pierre de Beaumarchais, French writer (d. 1799)
- February – Charles Churchill, English poet (d. 1764)
- February 6 – Charles Lee, general of the Continental Army (d. 1782)

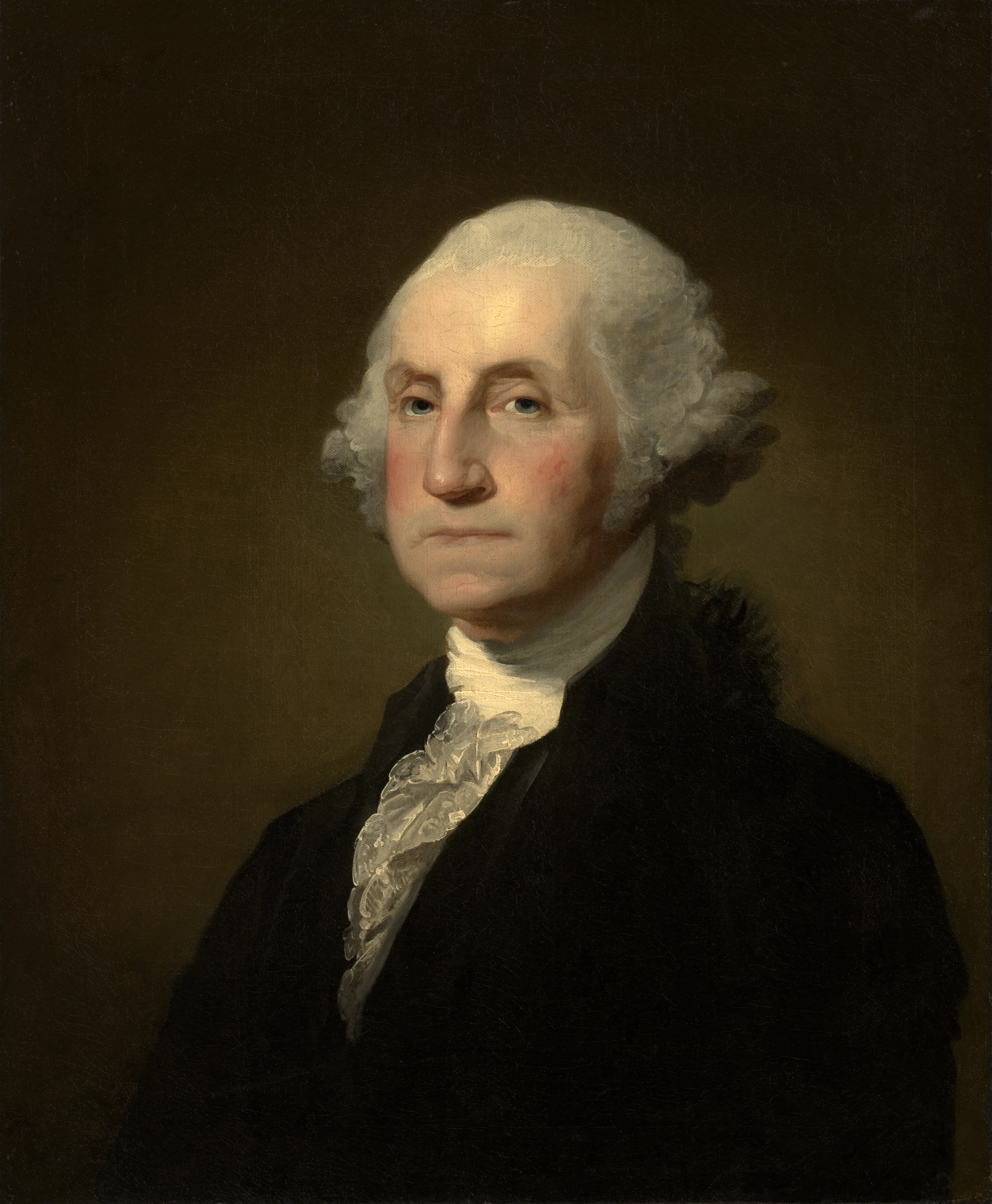
George Washington

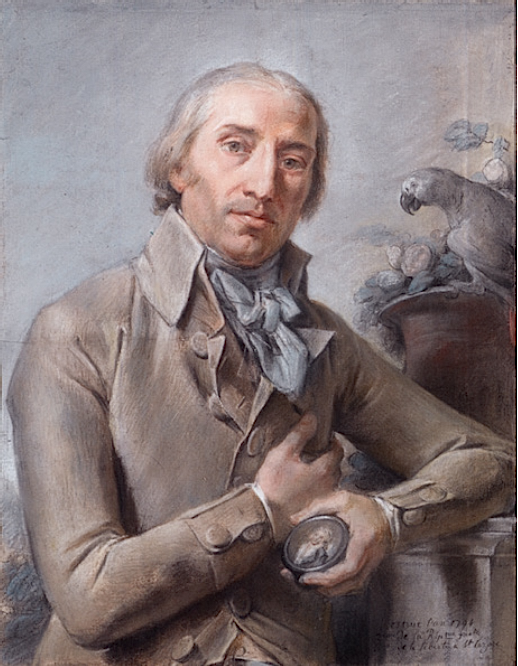
Jean-Bernard Restout

- February 22
  - George Washington, first President of the United States (d. 1799)
  - Jean-Bernard Restout, French painter (d. 1797)
- March 1 – William Cushing, Associate Justice of the Supreme Court of the United States (d. 1810)
- March 23 – Adélaïde of France, Princess of France and Duchess of Louvois (d. 1800)
- March 31 – Joseph Haydn, Austrian composer (d. 1809)
- April 5 – Jean-Honoré Fragonard, French painter (d. 1806)
- April 8 – David Rittenhouse, American astronomer, inventor, mathematician, surveyor, scientific instrument craftsman and public official (d. 1796)
- April 13 – Frederick North, Lord North, Prime Minister of Great Britain (d. 1792)
- April 17 – John Blair Jr., American politician and Associate Justice of the Supreme Court of the United States (d. 1800)
- June 21 – Johann Christoph Friedrich Bach, German composer (d. 1795)
- September 26 – José de Córdoba y Ramos, Spanish explorer, naval commander (d. 1815)
- September 30 – Jacques Necker, French politician (d. 1804)
- October 6 – Nevil Maskelyne, English Astronomer Royal (d. 1811)
- October 10 – John Hancock, American silversmith (d. 1784)
- October 24 – Cristina Roccati, Italian scholar in physics (d. 1797)
- November 4 – Thomas Johnson, American politician and Associate Justice of the Supreme Court of the United States (d. 1819)
- November 9 – Jeanne Julie Éléonore de Lespinasse, French salon holder (d. 1776)
- November 13 – John Dickinson, Governor of Delaware and Pennsylvania (d. 1808)
- December 6 – Warren Hastings, British administrator (d. 1818)
- December 15 – Carl Gotthard Langhans, German architect (d. 1808)
- December 21 – Johann Christian Wiegleb, German chemist (d. 1800)
- December 23 – Richard Arkwright, English inventor (d. 1792)
- date unknown – Francis Marion, American officer (d. 1795)

== Deaths ==
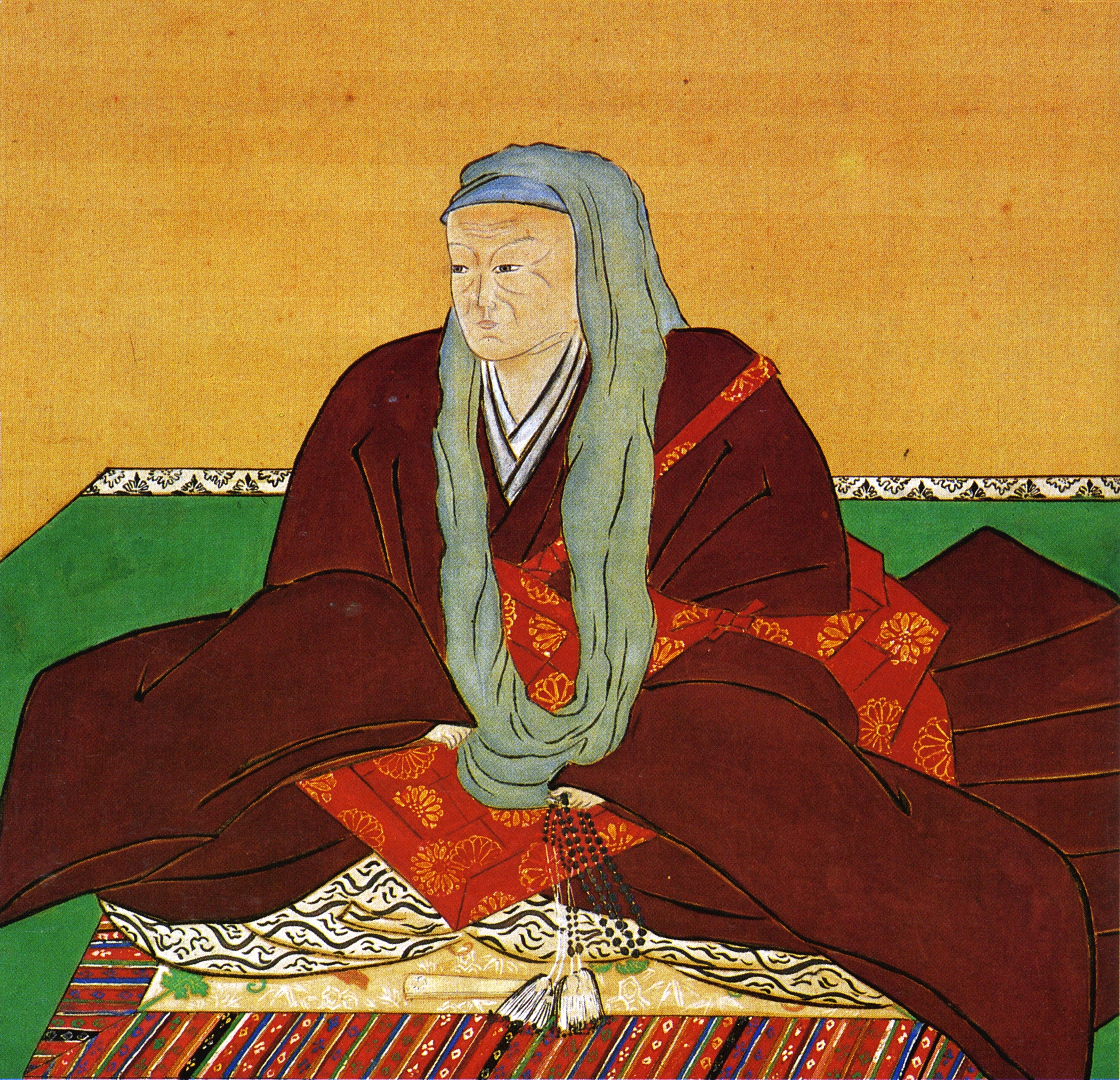
Emperor Reigen

- January 12 – John Horsley, British archaeologist (b. c.1685)
- January 14 – Richard Hancorne, Welsh clergyman (b. 1687)
- January 22 – Louis de Sabran, British theologian (b. 1652)
- February 6 – Anne Scott, 1st Duchess of Buccleuch, wealthy Scottish peeress (b. 1651)
- February 7 – William Hiseland, English (later British) soldier, reputed supercentenarian (b. 1620)
- February 13 – Charles-René d'Hozier, French historian (b. 1640)
- February 17 – Louis Marchand, French organist and harpsichordist (b. 1669)
- February 18 – Balthasar Permoser, German sculptor (b. 1651)
- February 22
  - Francis Atterbury, English bishop and man of letters (b. 1663)
  - Marie Thérèse de Bourbon, Princess of Conti and titular queen of Poland (b. 1666)
- February 27 – Giacomo Serpotta, Italian artist (b. 1652)
- February 28 – André Charles Boulle, French cabinet-maker (b. 1642)
- March 20 – Johann Ernst Hanxleden, German philologist (b. 1681)
- April 6 – Count Palatine Francis Louis of Neuburg, Hochmeister of the Teutonic Order (b. 1664)
- April 28 – Thomas Parker, 1st Earl of Macclesfield (b. 1666)
- May 20 – Thomas Boston, Scottish church leader (b. 1676)
- May 30 – John King, English churchman (b. 1652)
- July 11 – Theodore Eustace, Count Palatine of Sulzbach (b. 1659)
- July 15 – Woodes Rogers, English privateer and first Royal Governor of the Bahamas (b. c. 1679)
- September 24 – Emperor Reigen of Japan (b. 1654)
- October 6 – George Duckett (Calne MP), English politician (b. 1684)
- October 12 – Dionisia de Santa María Mitas Talangpaz, Filipino saint (b. 1691)
- October 25 – Andrea Brustolon, Italian artist (b. 1662)
- October 31 – Victor Amadeus II of Sardinia (b. 1666)
- November 10 – Adam Christian Thebesius, German anatomist (b. 1686)
- November 20 – Daniel d'Auger de Subercase, French naval officer, governor of Newfoundland (b. 1661)
- November 21 – Jan Jansen Bleecker, Mayor of Albany, New York (b. 1641)
- November 26 – Charles Sergison, English politician (b. 1655)
- December 4 – John Gay, English poet and dramatist (b. 1685)
- December 14 – Johann Philipp Förtsch, German opera composer (b. 1652)
- date unknown
  - Jiang Tingxi, Chinese painter, calligrapher, encyclopedist, foreign diplomat to Japan (b. 1669)
  - Agrippina Petrovna Volkonskaia, politically active Russian lady-in-waiting
