= Battle of Damietta =

Battle of Damietta, Sack of Damietta or Siege of Damietta may refer to:

- Sack of Damietta (853), a part of the Arab–Byzantine wars
- Siege of Damietta (1169), a part of the Crusader invasions of Egypt
- Siege of Damietta (1218–1219), a part of the Fifth Crusade
- Siege of Damietta (1249), a part of the Seventh Crusade
- Battle of Damietta (1732), a naval battle by the Maltese over the Turks
- Siege of Damietta (1799), a French victory over the Turks
- Battle of Damietta (1973) or Battle of Baltim, a part of the Yom Kippur War
