= Leprosy in Malta =

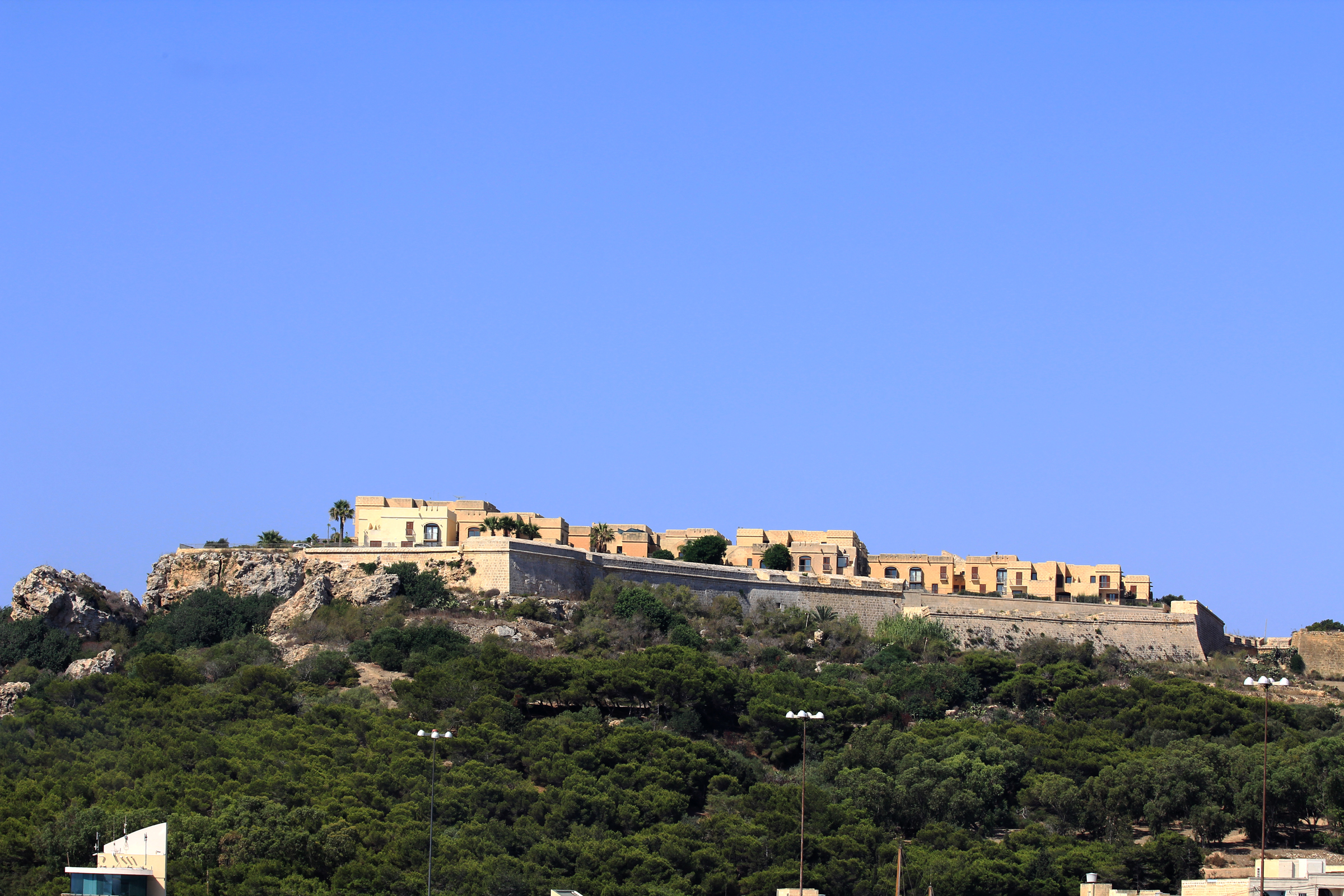
Fort Chambray in Gozo, where a hospital dedicated to the treatment of leprosy was based between 1937 and 1956

The history of leprosy in Malta began in the Middle Ages, but the disease became particularly prevalent in the Maltese archipelago during the 19th century.

== Before the 16th century ==
There is no clear information about the length of time leprosy has been present in Malta, but the origin of the Maltese word is clearly Semitic and suggests a link to Maltese history prior to the arrival of the Normans.

It has been proposed that the Hospitalier religious settlement, which was held by the Franciscans near Mdina, had a leprosarium, but there is a lack of historic evidence to support this.

The first clear testimony about leprosy in Malta is that of Garita Xejbais, a Gozitan, known as erga corpore morbo lepre (effects of leprosy on the body) when he gave his testament in support of the church in 1492. This example equally shows that the sick person maintained their legal rights, contrary to what happened in some European countries during the Middle Ages.

== Under the Knights of Malta ==
When the knights of the Order of St John of Jerusalem arrived in Malta in 1530, they brought their laws with them to the archipelago. Notably, it was stipulated that a knight who had contracted leprosy could be treated for the disease but could not keep his habit. Quarantine rules were decreed, and when the unwell were welcomed to the Sacra Infermeria, they were cared for in separate cells.

The first case reported during the Hospitalier period is that of a Dominican friar, who died in 1630 at his monastery in Ir-Rabat.

The interest shown by Maltese leaders in the illness grew over the course of the 17th century, as the contagiousness of the disease became better understood. For each suspected case, a precise diagnosis had to be confirmed by multiple specialists.

Census records show that prevalence of the disease remained rather weak as, during the 1687 census, only one 30-year-old woman living in Ħal Qormi is registered as suffering from leprosy, but it is likely that not all cases had been registered, and five other cases were identified during the same period. A few other cases were reported, like that of a religious woman at the monastery of Saint Catherine in Valletta who died in 1770, or that of the son of a Turkish dignitary who came to seek treatment on his journey to Marseille.

== The 19th century ==
At the beginning of the 19th century, cases of leprosy remained sporadic. Between 1839 and 1858, only seven cases of leprosy were noted— four men and three women. Despite these cases, however, the British health authorities in Malta responded negatively to an enquiry from the Royal College of Medicine about the presence of leprosy on the archipelago, recognising nevertheless that cases might be present but unidentified.

However, prevalence of the condition continued to grow during the second half of the 19th century, perhaps due to increased contact with North Africa but also with British India.

A special committee was created in 1883 which noted 30 known cases of the disease. There were 69 cases in 1890, with prevalence estimated at 42 per 100,000. Eight cases were noted in Gozo of which four were in In-Nadur. Only 11 advanced cases of the disease were admitted to the Ospizio for the poor in Il-Furjana. The majority of these cases came from rural areas, such as Ħal Qormi and Il-Mosta. A single case came from Valletta.

== The 20th century ==
In 1892, the construction of a specialist building for leprosy patients linked to the new hospital in Ħal Luqa was agreed, replacing the Ospizio in Il-Furjana. This building was named after Saint Bartholomew. Initially, the hospital only accepted male patients; female patients were only welcomed from 1912 onwards. The maximum number of patients was reached in 1917 with the presence of 114 patients, of which 71 were men and 43 were women, suggesting a prevalence in the archipelago of 49 per 100,000. The presence of the disease declined thereafter.

The isolation conditions were probably very difficult, as the unwell were treated more like prisoners than patients. Several incidents have been noted, in particular in 1900 when there were two attacks on guards and several escapees. A police presence was maintained on the site until 1903. Gradually, the rules regarding isolation were relaxed and the number of incidents diminished. The prevalence of the disease remained constant, with a rate calculated at 47.2 per 100,000 in 1916.

A new specialist service for Gozo patients (Sacré-Cœur hospital) opened at Fort Chambray in Gozo in 1937. However, due to the small number of patients, the service closed in 1956 and Gozo patients were sent to Saint Bartholomew hospital in Malta.

The arrival of effective antibiotics and the death of the oldest patients meant that the number of patients at the hospital diminished until its closure in December 1974. The 22 remaining patients were assigned to quarters in the Hal Ferha Estate (a development created in the abandoned fort of Ħal Għargħur) with the provision of a plot of land to cultivate and the care of a nurse and a doctor. There were no more than five of them in 1994.

== The 21st century ==
The last patient at the Hal Ferha Estate was transferred to a geriatric hospital in 2001. The centre was closed in 2004.

Leprosy has since been considered eradicated in Malta.
