= Giordano Colausig =

Italian footballer (1940–2025)

Personal information
- Date of birth: 16 December 1940
- Place of birth: Gradisca d'Isonzo, Italy
- Date of death: 16 November 2025 (aged 84)
- Height: 1.76 m (5 ft 9 in)
- Position: Midfielder

Senior career*
Years	Team	Apps	(Gls)
1961–1966	L.R. Vicenza	61	(5)
1966–1967	Roma	28	(2)
1967	Inter Milan	0	(0)
1968	Brescia	11	(0)
1968	Juventus	0	(0)
1968–1970	Genoa	47	(3)
1970–1973	Perugia	69	(2)
- * Club domestic league appearances and goals

Giordano Colausig (16 December 1940 – 16 November 2025) was an Italian professional football player. He played for seven seasons (89 games, 7 goals) in the Serie A for L.R. Vicenza, A.S. Roma and Brescia Calcio. Colausig died on 16 November 2025, at the age of 84.
