= Fort Chambray =

Fortress in Malta

- Forti Chambray
- Mġarr, Gozo, Malta
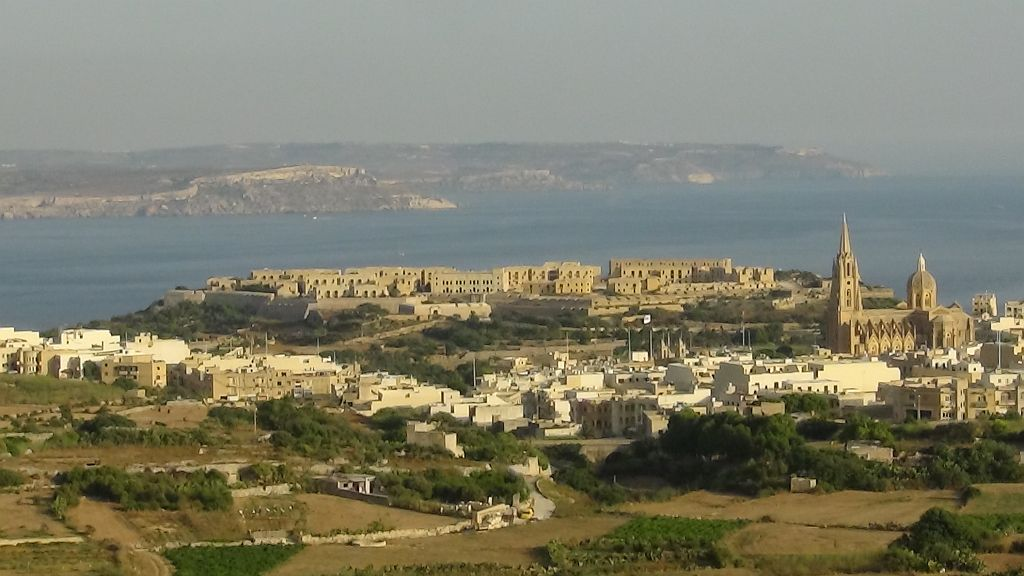
- Fort Chambray viewed from the landward side

Site information
- Type: Bastioned fort
- Owner: Government of Malta
- Controlled by: Fort Chambray Ltd
- Open to the public: No
- Condition: Intact

Location
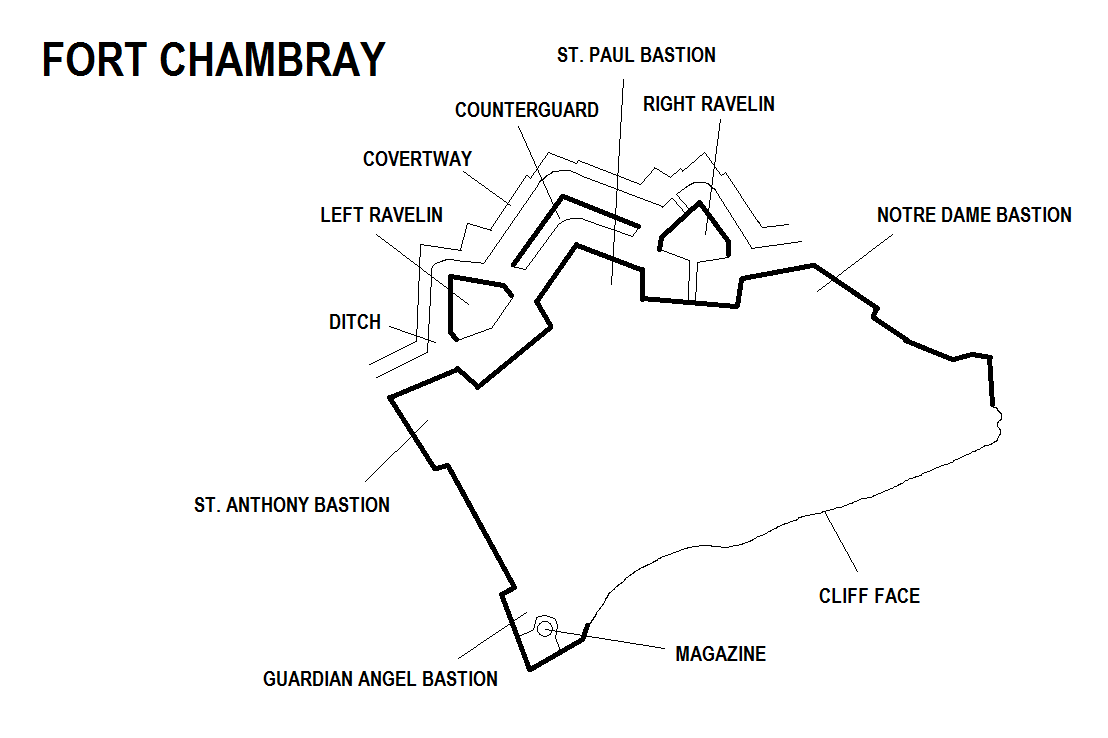
- Map of Fort Chambray
- Coordinates: 36°01′21″N 14°17′40″E

Site history
- Built: 1749–1760s
- Built by: Order of Saint John
- In use: 1760s–1916
- Materials: Limestone
- Battles/wars: French invasion of Malta (1798)

Fort Chambray or Fort Chambrai (Maltese: Forti Xambrè) is a bastioned fort located in the precincts of Għajnsielem, on the island of Gozo, Malta. It was built in the mid-18th century by the Order of Saint John, in an area known as Ras it-Tafal, between the port of Mġarr and Xatt l-Aħmar. The fort was meant to be the citadel of a new city which was to replace the Cittadella as the island's capital, but this plan never materialized.

The fort saw use during the French invasion of Malta in 1798, and was subsequently used as a military hospital and mental institution. The fort is currently being restored and redeveloped as a luxury accommodation.

== History ==
=== Background and construction ===
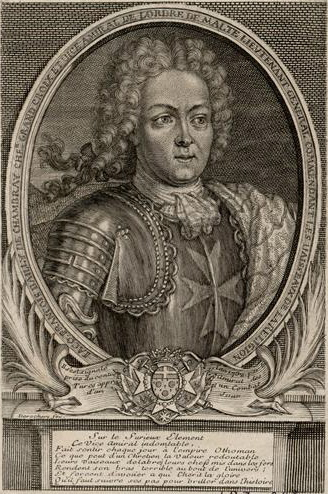
The fort was financed by and named after Jacques-François de Chambray

Fort Chambray is located on Ras it-Tafal, on high ground overlooking Mġarr Harbour. The area was defended by Garzes Tower, which was built in 1605, and a coastal battery built in the early 18th century. The tower and the battery were demolished, and no remains have survived.

In 1716, the French military engineer Louis François d'Aubigné de Tigné prepared plans for the construction of a fortified town at Ras it-Tafal. The Commissioners of Fortifications and War recommended constructing this proposed fort in a 1722 report, since it would be able to maintain the sea link with Malta, and would be able to take in Gozo's inhabitants and their livestock, relieving pressure from the Cittadella. However, construction was postponed indefinitely due to lack of funding.

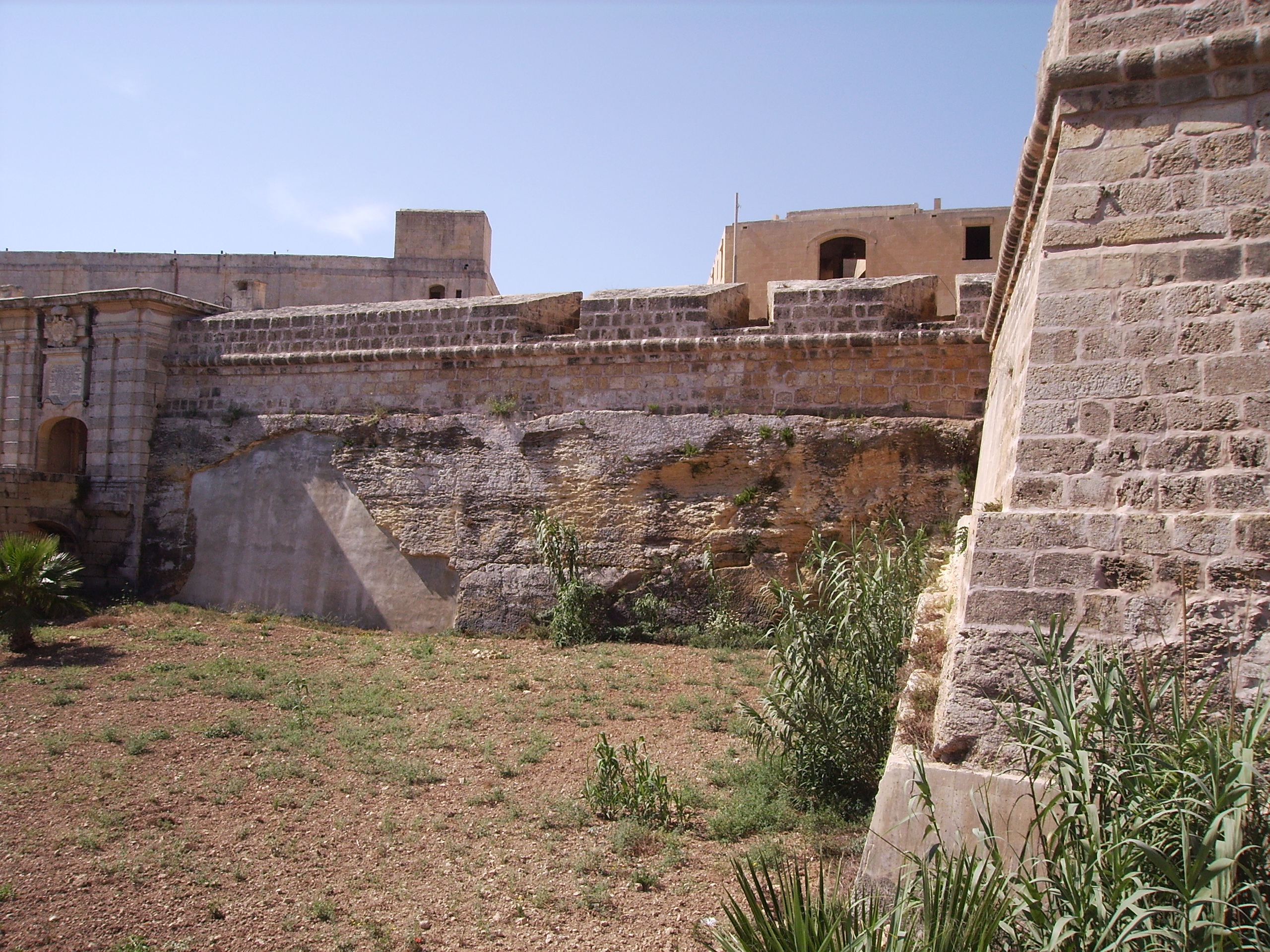
Curtain wall between the main gate (left) and St. Paul Bastion

In 1749, the new Governor of Gozo, Jacques-François de Chambray, informed Grand Master Manuel Pinto da Fonseca that he would pay for the construction of Tigné's proposed fort. The Congregation of Fortifications and War accepted the offer on 15 September, and sent the military engineer Francesco Marandon to survey the site. The latter made a few modifications to Tigné's original design, and construction of the fort began later in September 1749 under his supervision. Almost 200 workmen were employed for the construction of the fort.

Throughout the course of construction, a number of problems came up, including structural issues, a shortage of manpower, and the disobedience of workers. Excavation of the ditches and the initial stages of construction were largely complete by June 1752, and work on the fort proper began in October of the same year. The fort was almost ready by 1757, and it was fully completed in the early 1760s. The fort quickly fell into disrepair, being described as a ruin in 1789. Some minor repair works were carried out in 1796. The site was used as a temporarily prison by the law enforcers.

Once the fort was built, a rectilinear street pattern was laid out so the town could be constructed within the walls, as had been originally planned by Tigné. However, the plots were not purchased and the town never developed, mainly because the threat from the Ottoman Empire or the Barbary pirates had subsided, so Gozitans felt safe living in rural areas.

Plans for its development drawn in the 1750s show that there had to be a militarized Baroque town with a grid plan, similar to Valletta, and residences were to include their own private gardens. A large space in the middle was intended to be a piazza or town square, surrounded by the main buildings. The buildings at the piazza were to include the main church, a courthouse and the residence of the Castellan. These buildings were to have a shared symmetrical late Baroque portico, and a place d’armes was to be in the whereabouts. A number of farmhouses were built inside and outside the fort.

=== French invasion and occupation ===
Fort Chambray saw its first use during the French invasion of Malta in June 1798. When the French landed on Gozo, many inhabitants took refuge within Chambray, bringing their livestock with them. At the time, the fort was commanded by the knight de Megrigny, and it was armed with 72 pieces of artillery. The fort initially offered some resistance, but it capitulated after the French General Jean Reynier posted three companies in front of the fort, and issued a proclamation ordering its garrison to surrender. The Gozitans who had taken refuge returned to their homes with their cattle.

Following its capture, Fort Chambray was manned by a French garrison. On 3 September, a day after the Maltese uprising began in Mdina, the Gozitans revolted against the French, and quickly took over the island except for Fort Chambray and the Cittadella. On 28 October 1798, Gozitan rebels led by Saverio Cassar and British marines led by Captain Cresswell attacked the fort, and it capitulated on the following day. Other, probably more reliable, sources say that Fort Chambray was abandoned by French soldiers during the night of 16 and 17 September.

=== British rule ===
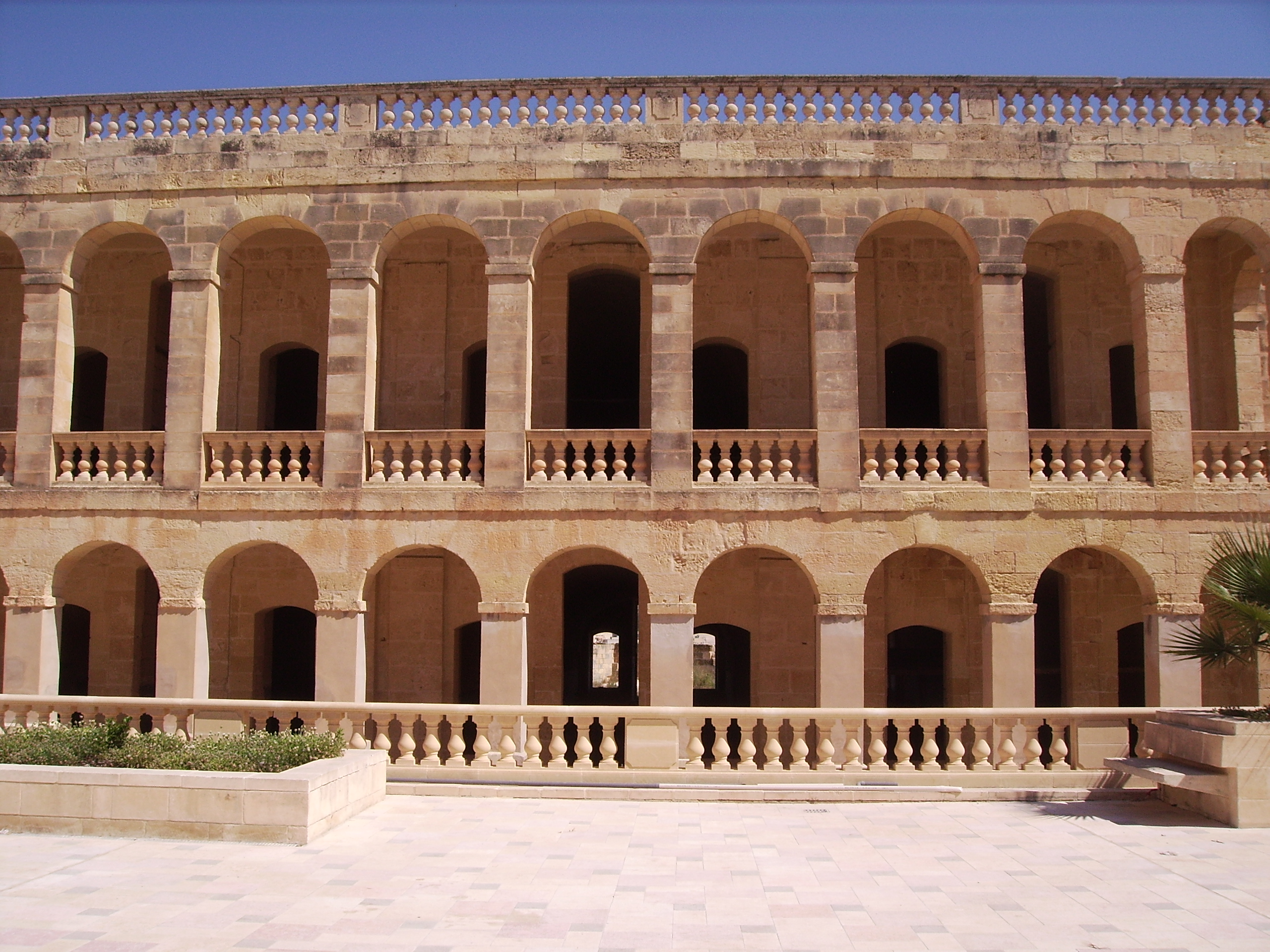
Barrack block within the fort

Malta and Gozo came under British rule in the beginning of the 19th century, and as a result Fort Chambray was taken over by a British garrison. By 1830, a small military hospital of four wards had been established within the fort. The hospital was expanded during the Crimean War, and hundreds of wounded soldiers were treated there. The hospital was subsequently used by both the British military and Maltese civilians when there were fever epidemics.

With the outbreak of the Anglo-Egyptian War in 1882, a large building which had previously been barracks was converted to a hospital in order to house casualties from the war. It was used as a Convalescent Depot during World War I, and thousands of ill or wounded patients passed through the hospital between October 1915 and its closure in March 1916. During this period, the medical staff issued a journal called The Fort Chambray Gazette.

The military gave up the fort in 1916, and from 1934 to 1983 it was used as a civilian mental hospital, housing up to 200 patients. A section of the fort was also used as a leprosarium between 1937 and 1956, under the name of Sacred Heart Hospital.

Throughout the years that the fort was used as a hospital, three cemeteries were built, one within the fort and two in the ditches.

=== Recent history ===
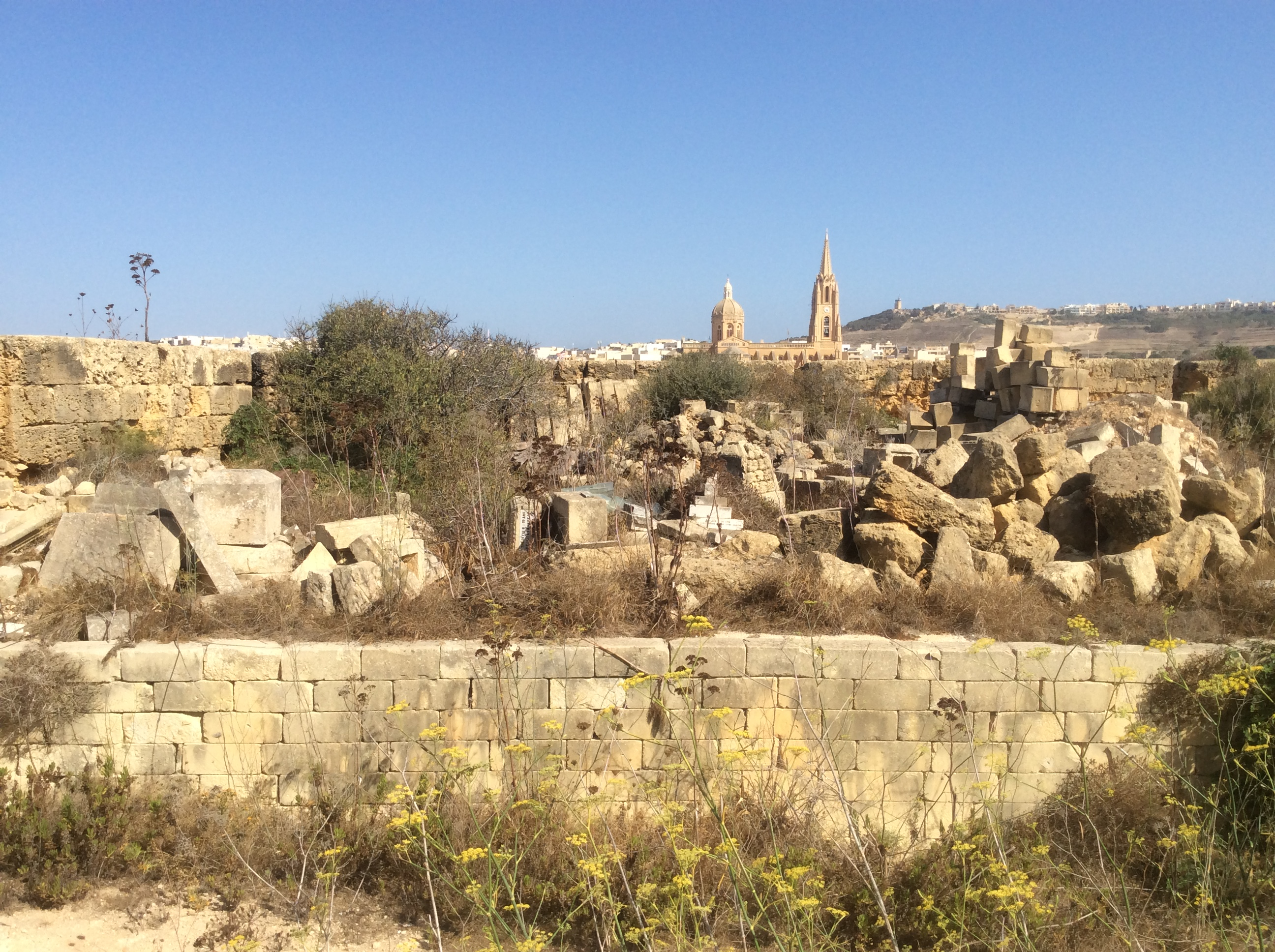
The tombstones amongst construction waste and dilapidation

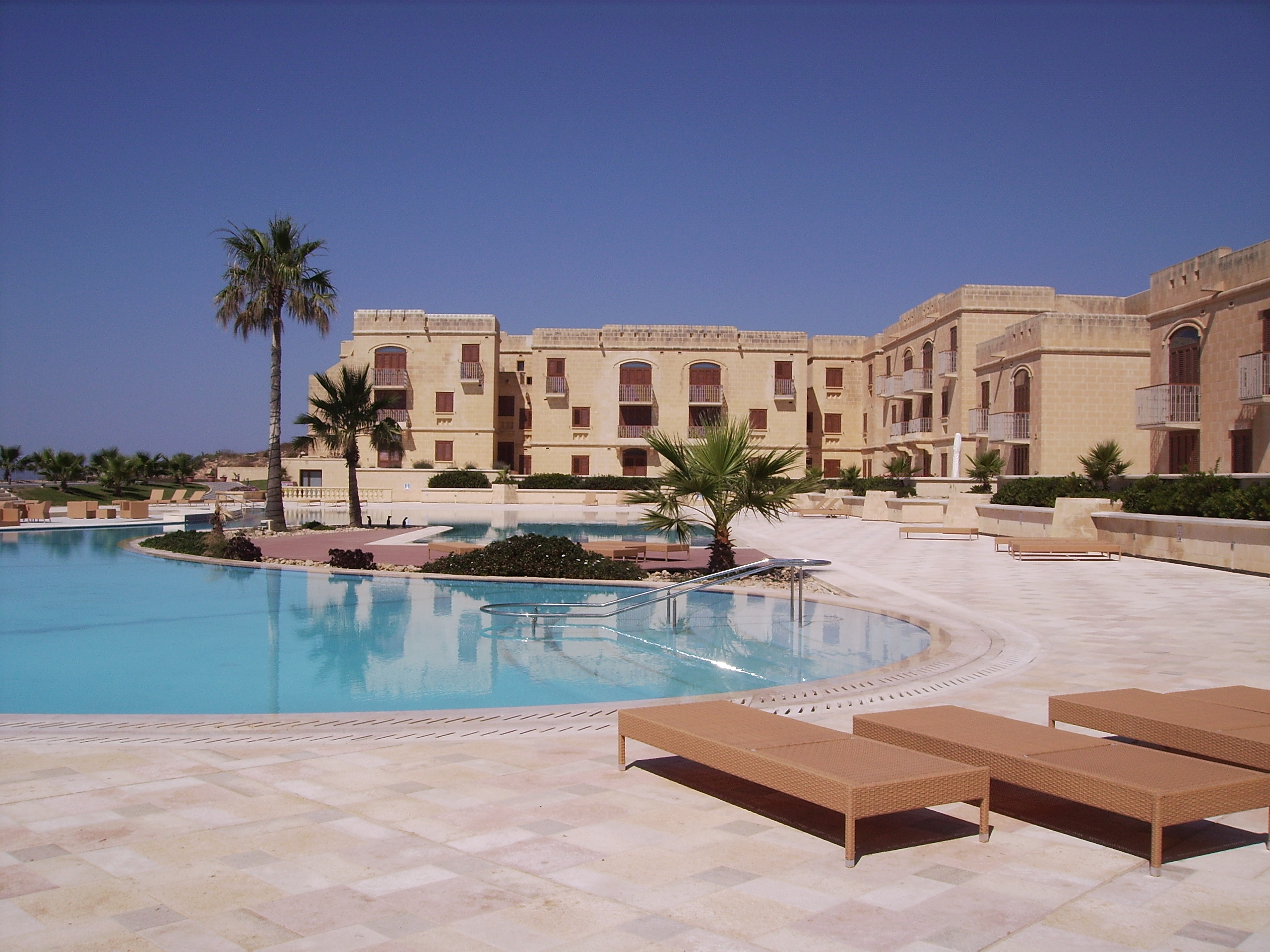
Modern developments within Fort Chambray

In 1979, part of the fort began to be converted into a tourist complex, a project which never materialized. The Garrison Cemetery was cleared in the mid-1980s, and the human remains were transferred to the Santa Maria Cemetery in Xewkija on 1 July 1991. The tombstones have been set aside in a secluded part of the fort. The destruction of this cemetery has been called an "act of cultural vandalism".

In January 1992, the Planning Services Division of the Ministry for Development of Infrastructure published the Fort Chambray Development Brief, in which it detailed that the fort should be redeveloped, while retaining the outer bastions, the barracks, bakeries, chapels and hospital complex. The brief also said that the tombstones from the cemetery should be used imaginatively in a landscaping scheme.

The interior of the fort began to be redeveloped in January 1993. A Master Plan was approved in 1995, and its owners took over the site in 2007. Since then, residential units have been built within the fort, and some of the bastions have been restored. A new Master Plan for phases two and three of the development was approved in 2012. It is now closed to the general public as it serves as a gated community.

== Layout ==
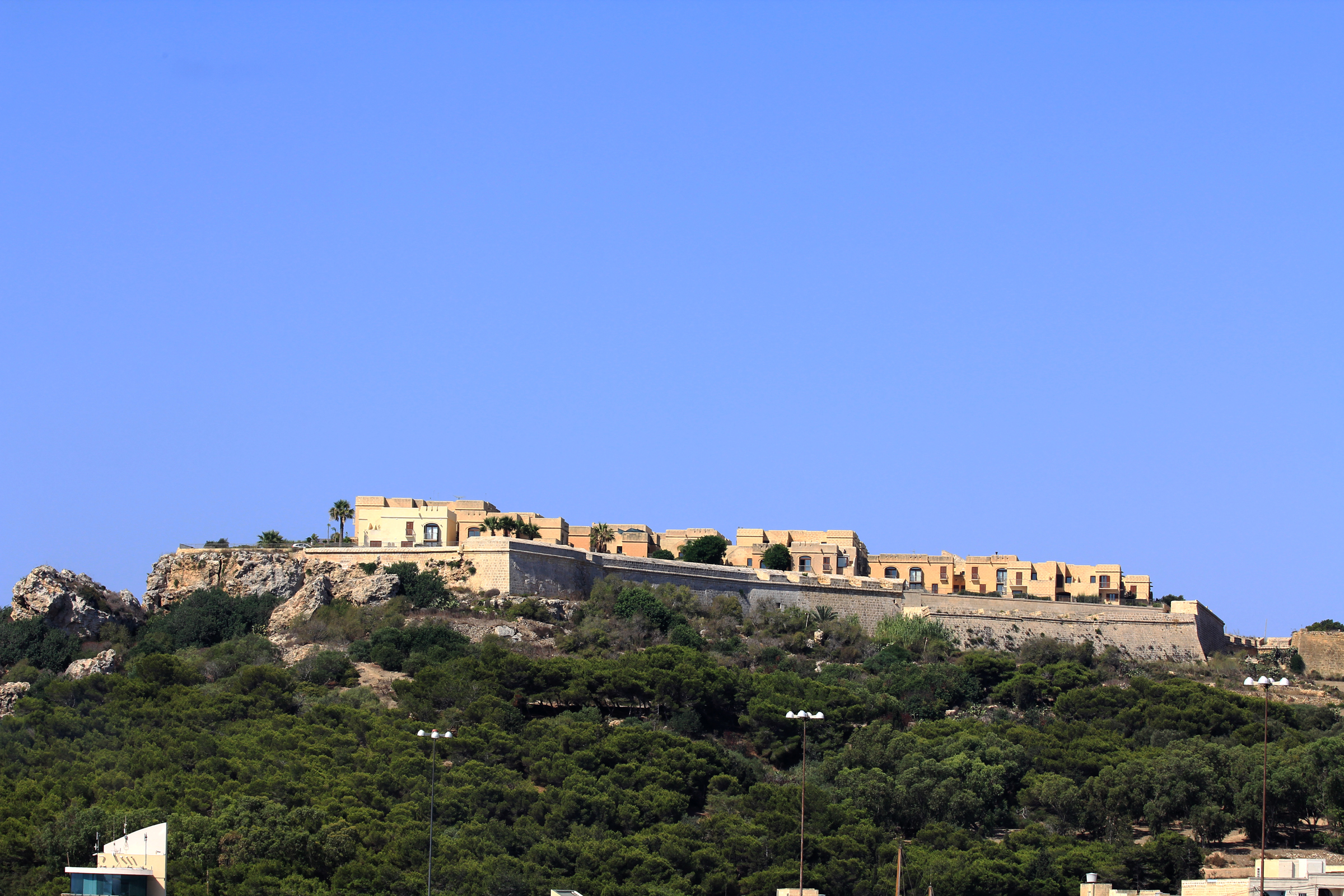
Fort Chambray as seen from Mġarr Harbour

Fort Chambray consists of four main parts: a bastioned land front and its outworks, two flanks overlooking Mġarr Harbour and Xatt l-Aħmar, and a cliff face facing the sea.

The land front consists of three bastions:

- St. Anthony Bastion – the pentagonal bastion at the right of the land front. It has a total of nine embrasures on its flanks and faces. A church was originally built on the bastion, and it now contains a number of modern buildings.
- St. Paul Bastion – the pentagonal bastion at the centre of the land front. It has a total of eighteen embrasures on its flanks and faces.
- Notre Dame Bastion – the demi-bastion at the left of the land front. It has six embrasures. Its right face has collapsed and slid down by about 20 feet.

The bastions are linked together by curtain walls, one of which contains the fort's main gate. They are protected by a ditch and the following outworks:

- a large counterguard protecting St. Paul Bastion.
- two ravelins protecting the curtain walls between the bastions. The Right Ravelin contains the fort's Advanced Gate.
- a covertway along the entire land front.

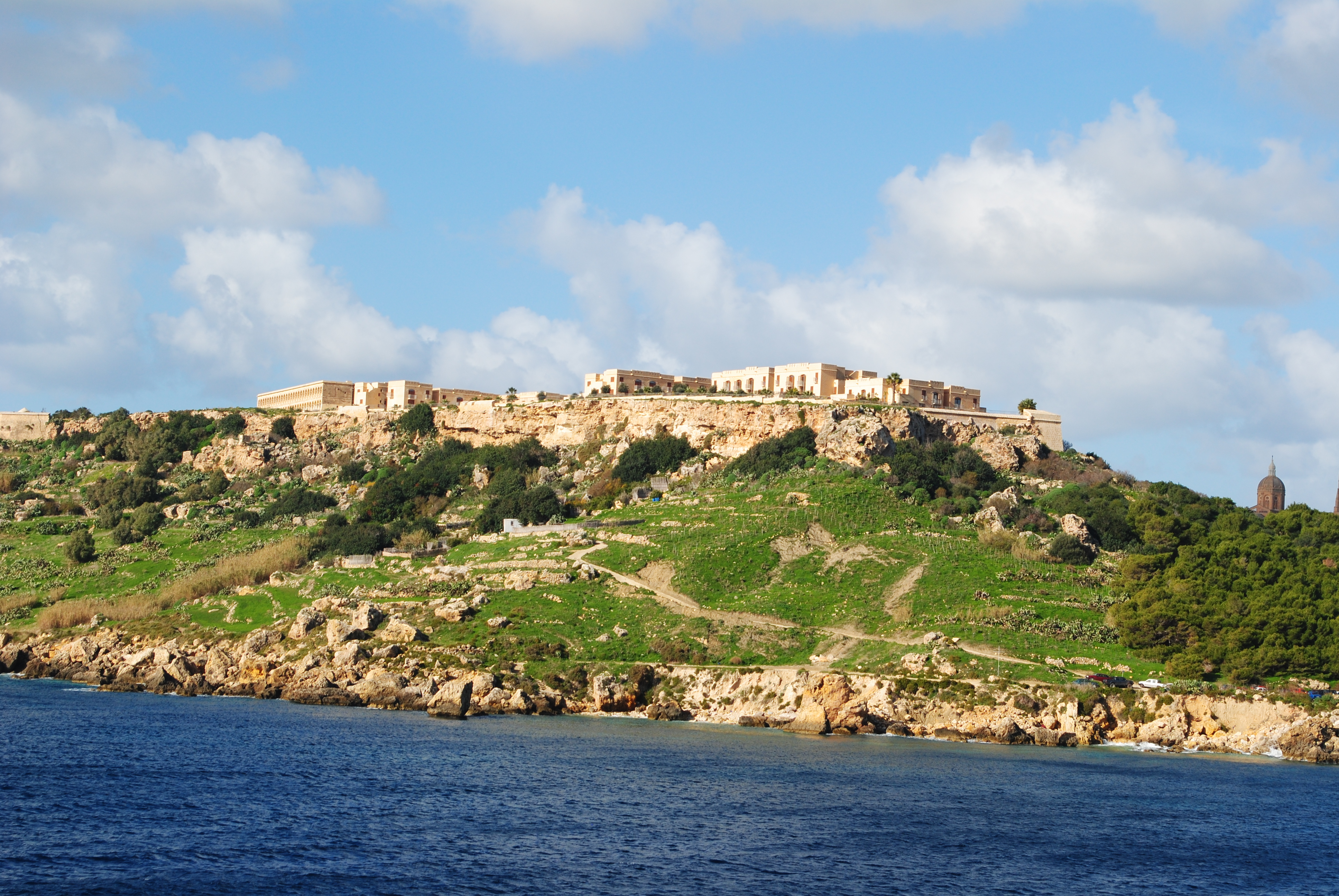
The cliff face which makes up the fort's southern perimeter

The fort's western flank, overlooking Xatt l-Aħmar, mainly consists of a curtain wall which was originally protected by a ditch, and the Guardian Angel Bastion, a pentagonal bastion at the southernmost part of the fort. It has five embrasures and a barbette parapet, a flat-roofed echaugette, and a polverista with a conical roof.

The fort's eastern flank, overlooking Mġarr Harbour, consists of an irregular trace linking Notre Dame Bastion to the cliff face, which makes up the entire southern perimeter of the fort, overlooking the Gozo Channel. Two traverses are located at the centre of the cliff face.
