= Gloucester County Conspiracy =

Foiled servant uprising in Virginia (1663)

The Indentured Servants' Plot historical marker

The Gloucester County Conspiracy of September 1663, also known as the Servant's Plot or Birkenhead's Rebellion, was one of the first slave rebellions in British America. This event set the stage for many of the slave uprisings that followed in the decades to come. It was the first occurrence of English, Irish, African, and American Indian indentured servants (and slaves) working together. Regardless of their ethnicity, all of the servants and slaves were treated poorly, which served as a uniting force between them. This rebellion occurred at a key time in history, when Virginian tobacco farmers heavily relied upon their workers for product and profit. By utilizing the power they held in this regard, the slaves and servants could maximize the effects of their actions.

== The plan ==
On September 1, 1663, a group of indentured servants met and began a plan of rebellion. Planning to reconvene the following Sunday at midnight at a different location, the men collected as many weapons and arms as they could over the next few days in order to power their upcoming fight. The plan was to attack the house of Lieutenant Colonel Francis Willis to convince him to allow indentured servants to be released a year from the beginning of their service. There were other potential targets around the area, but Willis was their ultimate goal, as he was a member of the governor's council. Should he refuse, the servants agreed to kill Willis, if it was deemed necessary. The men swore themselves to secrecy, but the secrecy was not kept.

== The foiling ==
One slave who attended the meetings, John Birkenhead (Berkenhead), had a different plan. Birkenhead was owned by the first mayor of Warwick County and officer of the House of Burgesses, Maj. John Smith. Birkenhead exposed the plot to the governor, who then arranged for the rebellion to be disbanded. The colony was so grateful for the prevention of the uprising that the scheduled day of rebellion, September 13, 1663, became remembered as holy.

For his loyalty, his owner, John Smith, gave Birkenhead his freedom, as well as five thousand pounds of tobacco. This was meant to serve as incentive for other slaves and servants to report any rumors of future rebellion.

As one of the early rebellions of this period, the Servant's Plot laid the foundation for many rebellions to come.
