= Jacques-François de Chambray =

French knight of Malta, commander, vice-admiral, lieutenant general and governor of Gozo

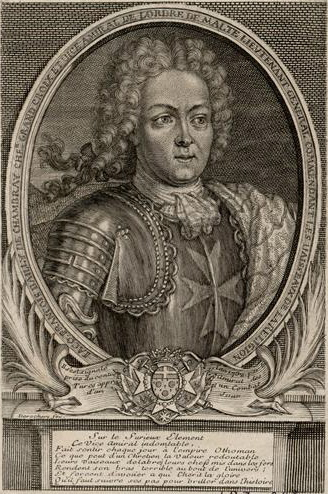

Governor of Gozo
- In office 1749–1750
- Appointed by: Manuel Pinto da Fonseca
- Preceded by: Charles de Guast
- Succeeded by: Pietro Sarsana (Pietro Paolo Zarcona)

Personal details
- Born: 15 March 1687 Évreux, Kingdom of France
- Died: 8 April 1756 (aged 69) Hospitaller Malta
- Resting place: Saint John's Co-Cathedral

Military service
- Allegiance: (Sovereign Military Order of Malta) Order of Saint John
- Branch/service: Hospitaller Navy
- Battles/wars: Battle of Damietta

Jacques-François de Chambray (15 March 1687 – 8 April 1756) was a French knight of Malta, commander, vice-admiral, lieutenant general and Governor of Gozo. He funded the construction of Fort Chambray, which was named after him.

== Biography ==
De Chambray was born in Évreux, Province of Normandy, the son of Baron Nicolas de Chambray and his wife Anne née Ledoux de Melleville. He arrived in Malta on 28 October 1700, where he was received as a minority in the Order of St John of Jerusalem on 29 March 1701 and in June of the same year was made the page of the Grand Master. When he came of age, he made his regular caravans and pronounced his vows in 1710.

He was commander of the commanderies of Sainte-Vaubourg in the Grand Priory of France and of Virecourt and Metz in the Grand Priory of Champagne.

In 1723, as captain of the 52-gun ship Saint-Vincent, he captured the Patrone de Tripoli, which he brought back with his crew to Malta. He was lieutenant general and vice-admiral of the Hospitaller Navy. He fought in this function with some success against the Ottomans and during the naval battle of Damietta in 1732.

He was ambassador of the Order during his trips to the royal court in Lisbon and to the viceroy of Naples. He was at sea until 1735 when he made his 55th and last campaign, after which he remained ashore in Malta.

From 1749 to 1750, he was appointed governor of the island of Gozo by the Grand Master Manuel Pinto da Fonseca. He took over a project to build a fort to defend the bay of Mġarr. He financed the construction with his own funds, paying 40,000 deniers. He had requested as a special favour that the product of his household effects, which amounted to 100,000 pounds, should be used to complete the fort. It was completed in 1758 after his death in 1756 and bears his name, Fort Chambray.

For services rendered by his uncle, Jacques-François de Chambray's nephew, Louis-François de Chambray, was received into the Order in 1755.

His arms, which appear on his epitaph at Saint John's Co-Cathedral in Valletta, are Ermine, three torteaux.

== Bibliography ==
- Jean Jacques Bourassé, Jacques-Paul Migne, Dictionnaire d'épigraphie chrétienne, vol. 1, Montrouge, Migne editor, 1852
- Dagues de Clairfontaine, Bienfaisance françoise, ou Mémoires pour servir à l'histoire de ce siècle, T. 2, Paris, JF Bastien, 1778
- Roger Marchal (under the direction). L'Écrivain et ses institutions in: Travaux de littérature, vol. XIX, ADIREL, 2006
- André Plaisse. Le Rouge de Malte, ou, Les curieux mémoires du bailli de Chambray, Rennes, 1991, Ouest-France University editions, coll. De Mémoire d'homme, 285 p.
