= Joseph de Gallifet =

French Jesuit priest (1663–1749)

Joseph de Gallifet (2 May 1663 – 1 September 1749) was a French Jesuit priest, known for his promotion of the devotion of the Sacred Heart of Jesus.

== Life ==
Gallifet was born near Aix-en-Provence, France. He entered the Society of Jesus at the age of fifteen, and upon taking up his studies came under the direction of Claude La Colombière, the confessor of Margaret Mary Alacoque. While on a mission of charity during his third year of probation at Lyon, he caught a fever which brought him to death's door. A certain father made a vow in his name that if he were spared, de Gallifet would spend his life in the cause of the Sacred Heart. Gallifet recovered and ratified the vow.

He had three successive rectorships—at Vesoul, at Lyon, and at Grenoble. The last-named appointment was followed by the provincialship of the Province of Lyon. In 1723, he was chosen assistant for France, an office which brought him to Rome. Here he worked effectively for the spread of the devotion.

Returning from Rome in 1732, he again became rector at Lyons where he passed his last years. He lived to see the establishment of over 700 confraternities of the Sacred Heart.

== Works ==
He wrote a book on the Blessed Virgin, and one on the chief virtues of the Christian religion; his major work, De Cultu Sacrosancti Cordis Dei ac Domini Nostri Jesu Christi, appeared in 1726. The main purpose of the book met with much opposition at first, and its plea for the establishment of a feast for the Sacred Heart was not crowned with victory until 1765.
