= Antonio Zucchelli =

- Born: March 8, 1663; Gradisca d'Isonzo, Gorizia, Italy
- Died: July 13, 1716 (aged 53); Gorizia, Italy

Antonio Zucchelli (March 8, 1663 – July 13, 1716) was an Italian Franciscan Capuchin friar, explorer and missionary. He is best known for his missionary work in the Kingdom of Kongo. In 1712 he published memoirs of his life in the Kongo.

== Memoirs ==
Antonio Zucchelli's memoirs include 23 reports. In them, he talked about his work and his travels, visiting the Kingdom of Kongo, Geona, Málaga, Cádiz, Lisbon, Brazil, the Kingdom of Angola, Malta, and Venice.

During a missionary from 1698 to 1702, Zucchelli claimed to have been told of a offspring between a human female and an ape.
