= Johann Martin Steindorff =

Johann Martin Steindorff (born 18 March 1663 in Teutleben, Thuringia; d. 3 May 1744 in Zwickau, Saxony) was a Baroque musician who served as Kantor at Zwickau. In 1722 he applied for the vacant post of Thomaskantor in Leipzig, but did not succeed and remained in Zwickau for the rest of his life.
