= Battle of Damietta (1732) =

Battle between Order of Malta and Ottoman Empire

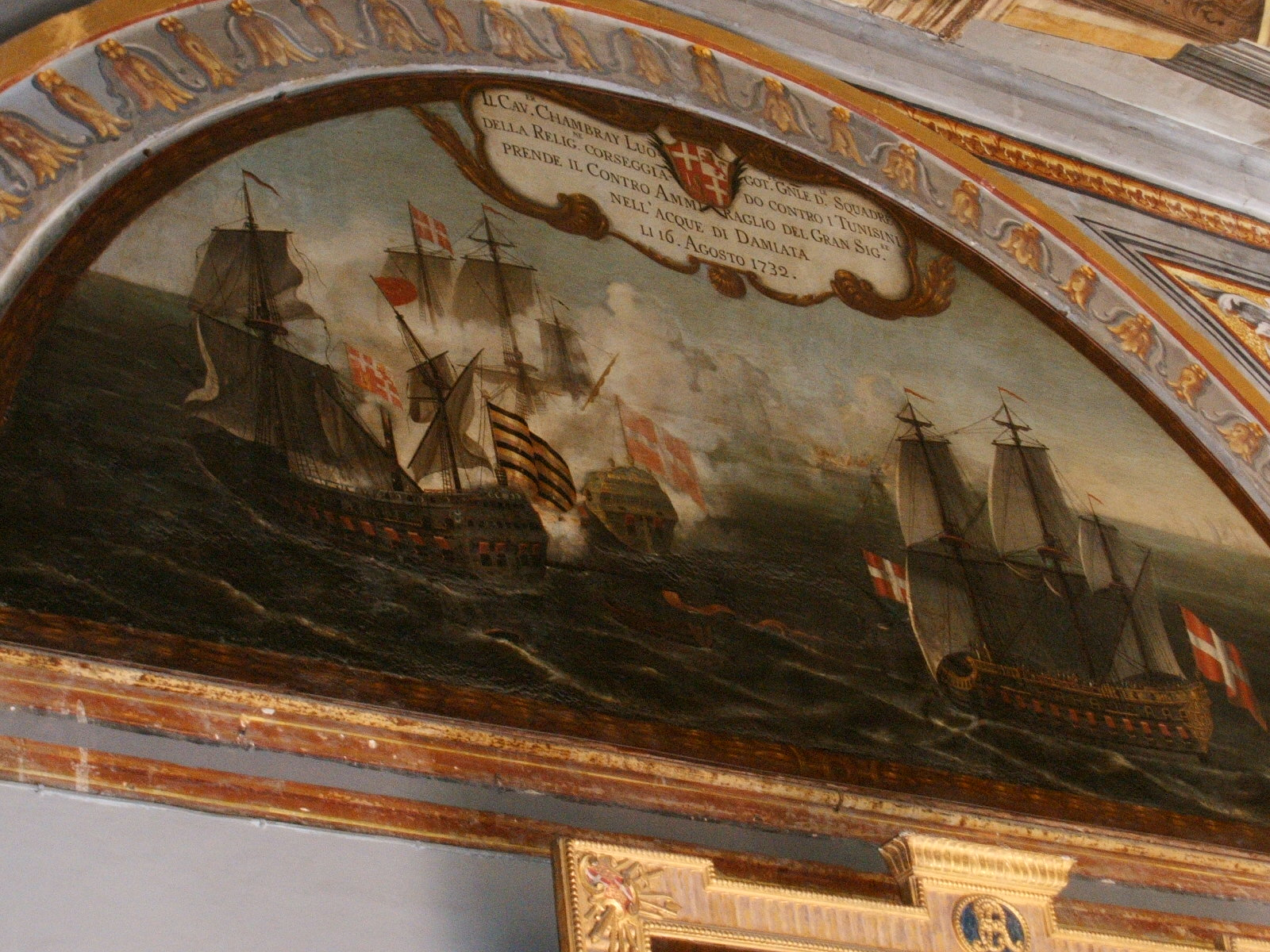
- Fresco of the Battle of Damietta at the Grandmaster's Palace, Valletta
Date	16 August 1732
Location	Off Damietta, Mediterranean Sea
Result	Order of Malta victory

Belligerents
Order of Malta	Ottoman Empire

Commanders and leaders
Jacques-François de Chambray	Kali Michamet

Strength
2 ships of the line 2 tartanes	1 flagship 40 merchant ships

Casualties and losses
8 dead 12 injured	1 flagship Unknown number of casualties 117 prisoners 14 Christian slaves freed

The naval battle of Damietta was fought on 16 August 1732 between the ships of a convoy of the Ottoman Empire and a small fleet of the Order of Malta under the command of Jacques-François de Chambray, off the coast of Damietta, Egypt. The Order emerged victorious and managed to liberate the Christian slaves held by the Ottomans.

== Background ==
After relocating from Rhodes to Malta, the Knights Hospitaller relied heavily on naval power to disrupt Ottoman shipping in the Mediterranean. Throughout the 16th and 17th centuries, they expanded their fleet from galleys to larger warships such as galleons and ships of the line, enabling more ambitious raids against Ottoman commerce and supply routes.

== Battle ==
In July 1732, Grand Master António Manoel de Vilhena instructed Jacques-François de Chambray to intercept an Ottoman convoy near Damietta. On 16 August 1732, Chambray's squadron encountered the Ottoman convoy, consisting of about 40 merchant ships escorted by the Sultana, a 70-gun ship of the line under the command of Ottoman vice-admiral Kali Michamet.

Chambray's two 60-gun ships of the line, Saint Antoine and Saint George, engaged the Sultana, while the Hospitaller corvettes attacked the merchant vessels. Despite fierce resistance, the Sultana was heavily damaged and dismasted. Kali Michamet initially refused to surrender, but by dawn his situation was untenable and he capitulated.

Although the Ottoman flagship remained afloat, it was set ablaze by the crew of the Saint George, denying Chambray the chance to claim it as a prize. Several merchantmen were captured, though many were empty of valuable cargo. The Knights nevertheless seized cannons, gunpowder, sails, cables, food supplies, and other useful equipment.

== Aftermath ==
The Hospitallers took 117 Ottoman prisoners and freed 14 enslaved Christians, who were transported to Malta. The liberated captives underwent quarantine before being reintegrated into Maltese society or into the Order's naval service. Meanwhile, Ottoman captives were sold in Valletta's slave markets for between 200 and 500 écus each.

The Knights suffered relatively light losses, 8 killed and 12 wounded. In recognition of his success, Jacques-François de Chambray was promoted to Knight Grand Cross of the Order of Malta.

== Sources ==
- Castillo, Dennis (2006). The Maltese Cross: a strategic history of Malta. Library of Congress. ISBN 0-313-32329-1.
- Dreux du Radier, Jean-François (1757). L’Europe illustre, contenant l’histoire abrégée des souverains (in French). Paris.
- Lewis, Charles Lee (1945). Admiral de Grasse and American Independence. United States Naval Institute.
- Moureau, François (2008). Captifs en Méditerranée (XVI–XVIIIe siècles): histoires, récits et légendes (in French). Presses de l’université Paris-Sorbonne.
- Pemsel, Helmut (1995). Seeherrschaft. Eine maritime Weltgeschichte von den Anfängen bis heute [Mastery of the Sea. A Maritime World History from the Beginnings to the Present Day] (in German). Augsburg.
- Quintano, Anton (2003). The Maltese-Hospitaller Sailing Ship Squadron 1701-1798. Publishers Enterprises Group. ISBN 9789990903485.
- Wismayer, Joseph M. (1997). The Fleet of the Orders of St. John 1580–1798. Valletta: Midsea Books. ISBN 99909-75-30-2.
