= Fiechter =

- Language: German

Origin
- Derivation: fihota
- Meaning: Pine trees

Other names
- Variant forms: Fichter, Fichter, Fichte, Fichter

Fiechter is a surname of German origin, a spelling variation of Fichter, derived from the Old High German word fiohta, meaning someone who lives near pine trees. Notable people with the name include:

- Arnold Fiechter (1879–1843), Swiss painter and teacher
- Betty Fiechter (1896–1971), Swiss businesswoman
- Ernst Robert Fiechter (1875–1948), Swiss architect and archaeologist
- Jake Fiechter (born 1946), American rower
- Jennifer Fiechter (born 1992), Swiss ski mountaineer
- Marc Fiechter (born 1975), Swiss footballer
- Nils Fiechter (born 1996), Swiss politician
- Oliver Fiechter (born 1972), Swiss economic philosopher, entrepreneur and author
- Olivia Fiechter (born 1995), American squash player

== See also ==
- John Fiechter House, also known as Failing Cottage, is a historic house in Benton County, Oregon, United States
