= 1735 =

1735 in various calendars
- Gregorian calendar: 1735; MDCCXXXV
- Ab urbe condita: 2488
- Armenian calendar: 1184; ԹՎ ՌՃՁԴ
- Assyrian calendar: 6485
- Balinese saka calendar: 1656–1657
- Bengali calendar: 1141–1142
- Berber calendar: 2685
- British Regnal year: 8 Geo. 2 – 9 Geo. 2
- Buddhist calendar: 2279
- Burmese calendar: 1097
- Byzantine calendar: 7243–7244
- Chinese calendar: 甲寅年 (Wood Tiger); 4432 or 4225 — to — 乙卯年 (Wood Rabbit); 4433 or 4226
- Coptic calendar: 1451–1452
- Discordian calendar: 2901
- Ethiopian calendar: 1727–1728
- Hebrew calendar: 5495–5496
- Hindu calendars
- Vikram Samvat: 1791–1792
- Shaka Samvat: 1656–1657
- Kali Yuga: 4835–4836
- Holocene calendar: 11735
- Igbo calendar: 735–736
- Iranian calendar: 1113–1114
- Islamic calendar: 1147–1148
- Japanese calendar: Kyōhō 20 (享保２０年)
- Javanese calendar: 1659–1660
- Julian calendar: Gregorian minus 11 days
- Korean calendar: 4068
- Minguo calendar: 177 before ROC 民前177年
- Nanakshahi calendar: 267
- Thai solar calendar: 2277–2278
- Tibetan calendar: ཤིང་ཕོ་སྟག་ལོ་ (male Wood-Tiger); 1861 or 1480 or 708 — to — ཤིང་མོ་ཡོས་ལོ་ (female Wood-Hare); 1862 or 1481 or 709

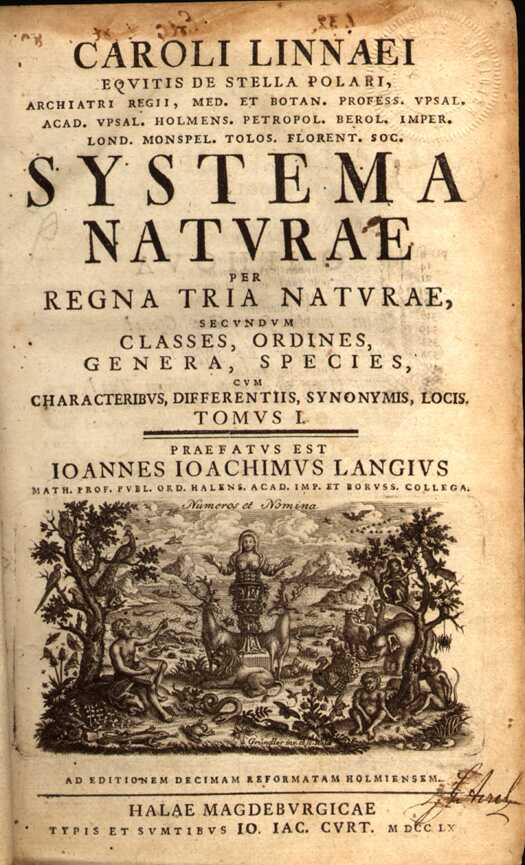
Linnaeus publishes his Systema Naturae.

1735 (MDCCXXXV) was a common year starting on Saturday of the Gregorian calendar and a common year starting on Wednesday of the Julian calendar, the 1735th year of the Common Era (CE) and Anno Domini (AD) designations, the 735th year of the 2nd millennium, the 35th year of the 18th century, and the 6th year of the 1730s decade. As of the start of 1735, the Gregorian calendar was 11 days ahead of the Julian calendar, which remained in localized use until 1923.

== Events ==
=== January–March ===
- January 2 – Alexander Pope's poem Epistle to Dr Arbuthnot is published in London.
- January 8 – George Frideric Handel's opera Ariodante is premièred at the Royal Opera House in Covent Garden, London.
- February 3 – All 256 people on board the Dutch East India Company ships Vliegenthart and Anna Catherina die when the two ships sink in a gale off of the Netherlands coast. The wreckage of Vliegenthart remains undiscovered until 1981.
- February 14 – The Order of St. Anna is established in Russia, in honor of the daughter of Peter the Great.
- March 10 – The Russian Empire and Persia sign the Treaty of Ganja, with Russia ceding territories in the Caucasus mountains to Persia, and the two rivals forming a defensive alliance against the Ottoman Empire.
- March 11 – Abraham Patras becomes the Governor-General of the Dutch East Indies (modern-day Indonesia) upon the death of Dirck van Cloon.

=== April–June ===
- April 13 – Emperor Sakuramachi accedes to the throne of Japan.
- April 16 – Alcina, George Frideric Handel's Italian opera, premieres at the Royal Opera House in Covent Garden, London.
- May 22 – George Hadley publishes the first explanation of the trade winds.
- June 15 – Lê Thuần Tông, Emperor of Đại Việt since 1732, dies at the age of 36 and is succeeded by Lê Ý Tông.
- June 25 – In Great Britain, the Engraving Copyright Act 1734, the first of a series of copyright protection laws, takes effect after being given royal assent by King George II.

=== July–September ===
- August 16 (August 5 old style) – John Peter Zenger of The New York Weekly Journal becomes a symbol of freedom of the press when he is acquitted of seditious libel against William Cosby, the British Governor of the Province of New York. A jury concludes that what Zenger published was true.
- September 4 – Al-Husayn I ibn Ali, the first Bey of Tunis (modern-day Tunisia) is defeated at the Battle of Smindja by Abu l-Hasan Ali I with the help of Ibrahim ben Ramdan, the Dey of Algiers.
- September 14 – The Kingdom of France approves the issue of "card money" in the total amount of 200,000 livres to serve as currency in its Louisiana territory in America.
- September 22 – Sir Robert Walpole, the Prime Minister of Great Britain, becomes the first British premier to move into London's 10 Downing Street.

=== October –December ===
- October 3 – An agreement between the European powers brings a ceasefire in the War of the Polish Succession, one week short of the second anniversary of the war. With France and Spain on the side of the reigning monarch, Stanisław Leszczyński, and Prussia, Russia and Austria supporting Augustus III, a preliminary peace is signed that is ratified as the Treaty of Vienna (1738). By the terms of the treaty, Stanisław Leszczyński renounces his claim on the Polish throne and recognizes Augustus III, Duke of Saxony. As compensation he receives instead the duchies of Lorraine and Bar which are to pass to France upon his death.
- October 14 – John Wesley and his brother Charles set sail from England for Savannah in the Province of Georgia in British America; on the voyage they first encounter members of the Moravian Church.
- October 18 – In China, Qianlong succeeds his father, Yongzheng, as Emperor and begins a 60-year-long reign within the Qing dynasty.
- November 25 – The largest bell in the world, the 22 foot (6.7 m) diameter Tsar Kolokol, is successfully cast in Moscow within the Kremlin.
- November 30 – The Netherlands becomes the first government to announce a prohibition against citizens joining the Freemasons.
- December 6 – The second successful appendectomy is performed by naturalised British surgeon Claudius Aymand at St George's Hospital in London (the first was in 1731).
- December 19 – At the age of 8 years old, Prince Luis of Spain becomes the youngest Roman Catholic Cardinal in history, after being named by Pope Clement XII.

=== Date unknown ===
- Russo-Turkish War, 1735-1739: Russian forces fail to occupy the Crimea, due to rasputitsa.
- Linnaeus publishes his Systema Naturae.
- A shipbuilding industry begins in Mumbai.
- Leonhard Euler solves the Basel problem, first posed by Pietro Mengoli in 1644, and the Seven Bridges of Königsberg problem.
- The King's Highway (Charleston to Boston) is completed.
- Quebec: Construction begins on the Chemin du roy between Quebec and Montreal.
- Augusta, Georgia, is founded.
- Cobalt is discovered and isolated by Georg Brandt, the first metal element found since ancient times.
- Probable date – Founded by Jehan-Jacques Blancpain in Villeret, Switzerland, Blancpain becomes the first registered watch brand in the world.

== Births ==
- January 1 – Paul Revere, American silversmith and patriot (d. 1818)
- January 8 – John Carroll first Roman Catholic Archbishop in the U.S. (d. 1815)
- January 9 – John Jervis, 1st Earl of St Vincent, British Royal Navy admiral (d. 1823)
- January 27 – Étienne Clavière, French financier and politician (d. 1793)
- February 13 – Crown Prince Sado of Joseon (d. 1762)
- February 28 – Alexandre-Théophile Vandermonde French musician and chemist (d. 1796)
- March 1 – Caroline Thielo, Danish actress (d. 1754)
- March 29 – Johann Karl August Musäus German author (d. 1787)
- May 1 – Lorenzo Hervás y Panduro Spanish Jesuit philologist (d. 1809)
- May 23 – Charles Joseph, Prince de Ligne, (d. 1814)
- June 16 – Nicolas Bernard Lépicié, French painter (d. 1784)
- June 26 – Joseph Ducreux, French noble, portrait painter, pastelist, miniaturist and engraver (d. 1802)
- July 4 – Jacoba van den Brande, Dutch culture personality (d. 1794)
- July 10 – Ulrika Pasch, Swedish painter (d. 1796)
- August 7 - Claudine Picardet, French chemist, mineralogist, meteorologist and scientific translator (d. 1820)
- September 5 – Johann Christian Bach, German composer (d. 1782)
- September 6 – John Joseph Merlin, born Jean-Joseph Merlin, Liège-born clock- and musical-instrument-maker and inventor (d. 1803)
- September 20 – James Keir, Scottish geologist, chemist and industrialist (d. 1820)
- September 28 – Augustus FitzRoy, 3rd Duke of Grafton, Prime Minister of the United Kingdom (d. 1811)
- October 9 – Karl Wilhelm Ferdinand, Duke of Brunswick (d. 1806)
- October 21 – Richard Gough, English antiquary (d. 1809)

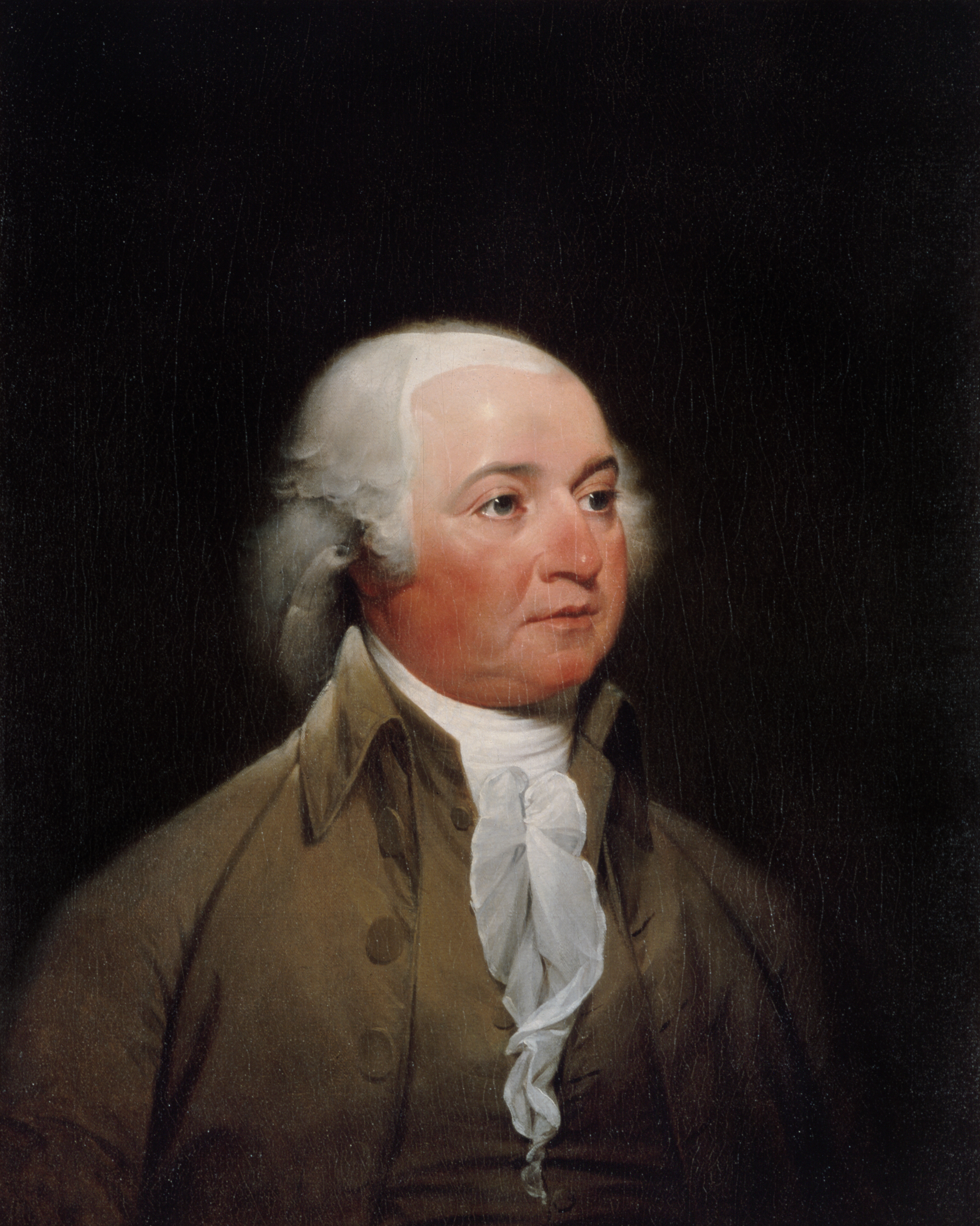
John Adams

- October 30 – John Adams, second president of the United States (d. 1826)
- November 10 – Granville Sharp, English abolitionist (d. 1813)
- December 29 – Thomas Banks, English sculptor and artist (d. 1805)
- December 31 – Jean de Crévecoeur, French-American writer (d. 1813)
- date unknown
  - John Julius Angerstein, Russian-born English merchant, insurer and art collector (d. 1823)
  - William Bell, English portrait painter from Newcastle upon Tyne (d. c. 1806)
  - Bety of Betsimisaraka, queen regnant (d. 1805)
  - Mary Evans, Welsh religious leader (d. 1789)
  - Edward Telfair, Scottish-born American politician and Governor of Georgia (d. 1807)
  - Regina-Louise von Freedricksz, Russian industrialist (d. 1821)

== Deaths ==
- January 5 – Carlo Ruzzini, Doge of Venice (b. 1653)
- January 12 – John Eccles, British composer (b. 1668)
- January 13 – Polyxena of Hesse-Rotenburg, Queen consort of Sardinia (b. 1706)
- January 18 – Maria Clementina Sobieska, Polish noble (b. 1702)
- February 27 – John Arbuthnot, British physician and author (b. 1667)
- March 25 – Daniel Gottlieb Messerschmidt, German scientist (b. 1685)
- April 5 – William Derham, English minister and writer (b. 1657)
- April 8 – Francis II Rákóczi, Hungarian rebel against the Habsburgs (b. 1676)
- April 23 – Edward Hawarden, English Catholic theologian (b. 1662)
- April 25 – Samuel Wesley, English poet, religious leader (b. 1662)
- June 10 – Thomas Hearne, British antiquarian (b. 1678)
- June 22 – Pirro Albergati, Italian composer (b. 1663)
- July 18 – Johann Krieger, German composer and organist (b. 1651)
- July 26 – Jesper Swedberg, Swedish bishop (b. 1653)
- July 29 – Sophia Louise of Mecklenburg-Schwerin, Prussian queen consort (b. 1685)
- August 30 – Edward Harley, English politician (b. 1664)
- September 18 – Justus van Effen, Dutch author (b. 1684)
- September 27 – Peter Artedi, Swedish naturalist (drowned) (b. 1705)

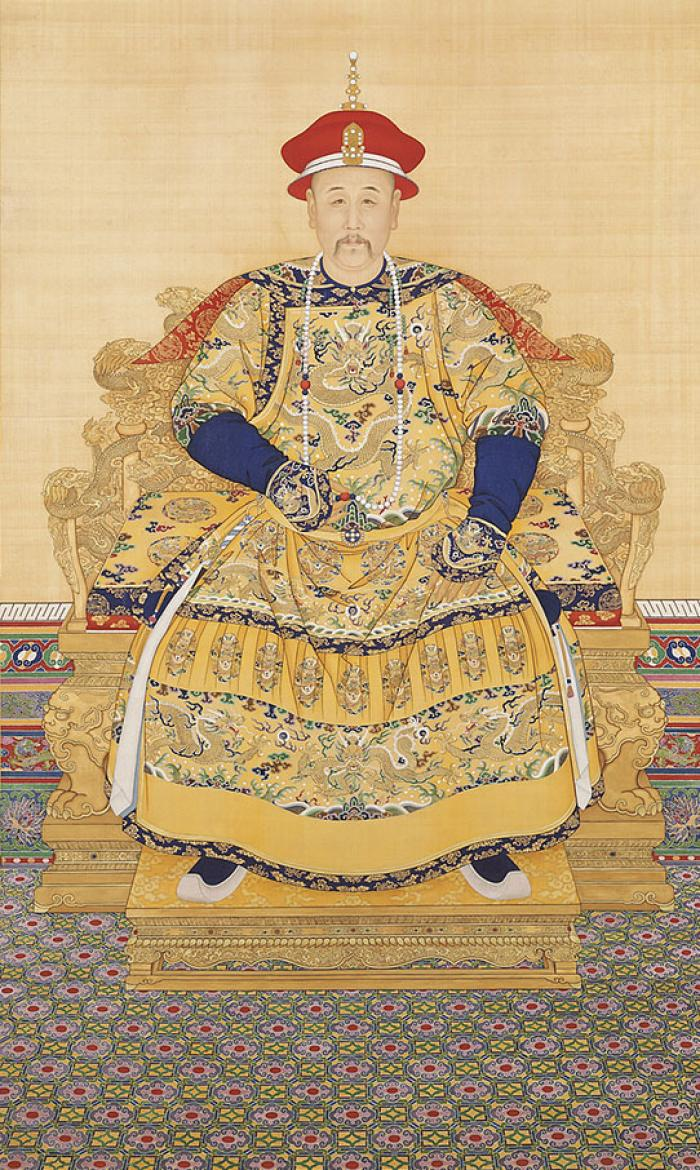
Yongzheng Emperor

- October 8 – Yongzheng Emperor of Qing China (b. 1678)
- October 26 – Margareta von Ascheberg, Swedish land owner, countess and acting regiment colonel (b. 1671)
- November 14 – Frederick William, Prince of Hohenzollern-Hechingen (b. 1663)
- November 29 – Bernardo de Hoyos, Beatified Spanish priest (b. 1711)
- December 14 – Thomas Tanner, English bishop, antiquarian (b. 1674)
