= Fichtner =

Fichtner, Fiechtner, or any variant thereof is a surname originating from areas where German is spoken.

Groups of Fichtners helped to colonize the early United States, with the emergence of Fichtners into Pennsylvania in the mid-1760s. Fichtners also settled in the Russian Empire as Catherine the Great opened up Russian lands to German settlement during her reign.

The name is common within modern Germany, specifically in southern Germany. Fichtners also remain in modern-day Ukraine and many live within the United States today, concentrated in the Midwest and Northwest.

== People with the surname ==
- Christy Fichtner (born 1962), American beauty pageant winner
- Hans Fichtner (1917–2012), rocket scientist
- Randy Fichtner, American football coach
- Ross Fichtner (1938–2022), American football player
- Ullrich Fichtner (born 1965), German journalist and author
- William Fichtner (born 1956), American actor

== Fictional people ==
- "Julian Fichtner" is the pen name used by Whittaker Chambers to sign his 1926 playlet "On the Beach," published in the Lavender student literary magazine of the City College of New York

== See also ==
- Fichtl
- Fichtel (surname)
- Fichte (surname)
- Fichten
- Fichtenholz
- Fichter
- Fichtner
- Fichtenbauer
