= Fichtenholz =

Fichtenholz is a German-language Jewish surname literally meaning "Spruce wood". Notable people with this surname include:

- Grigoriy Mikhailovich Fichtenholz (1888–1959), Ukrainian-born Soviet mathematician
- Mikhail Izrailevich Fichtenholz (1920–1985), Ukrainian-born Soviet violinist

== See also ==
- Fichtl
- Fichtel (surname)
- Fichte (surname)
- Fichten
- Fichtenholz
- Fichter
- Fichtner
- Fichtenbauer
