= Jorge Cervera Hauser =

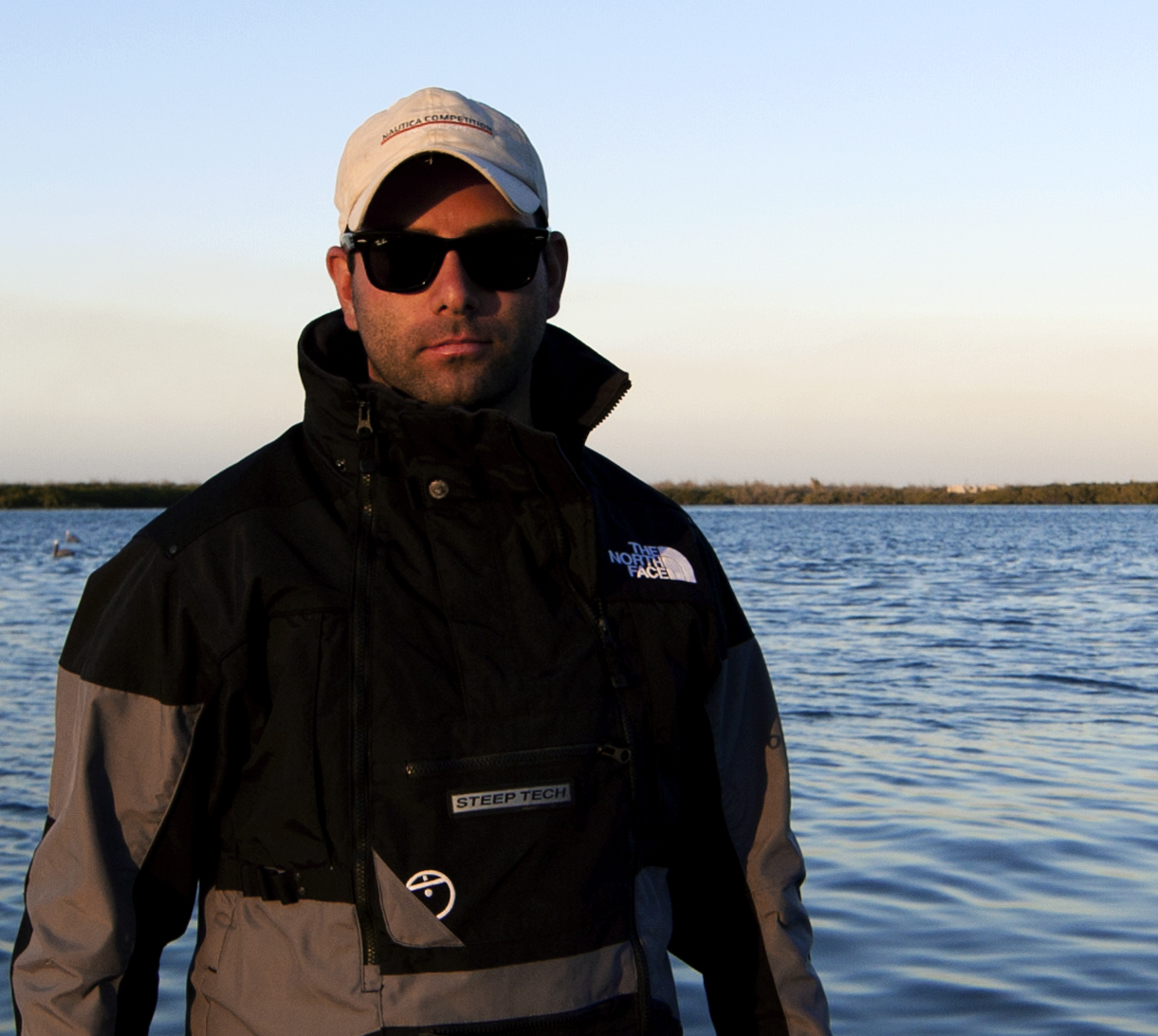
- Occupations: underwater photographer, film producer

Jorge Cervera Hauser is a Mexican underwater photographer and film producer known for his work documenting marine wildlife. His underwater photography, including images of sharks and orcas, has been featured by National Geographic, Wired, Discovery Channel, Nauticam, and the Outdoor Journal. He was a member of the ocean-conservation organization Pelagic Life from 2012 to 2020 and produced the documentary México Pelágico (2014), which focused on Mexico's open-ocean ecosystems and sustainable alternatives to shark fishing.

Hauser later founded and served as an early chief executive of Pelagic Fleet, an expedition and liveaboard operation in Mexico.

In 2023, Cervera Hauser founded Sherpa GX, an adventure travel company organizing expeditions to remote regions.

Hauser has collaborated with Blancpain through its Ocean Commitment initiative. His photographs were included in the Edition Fifty Fathoms underwater-photography project, and he has subsequently been identified by Blancpain as one of its featured underwater photographers. In 2025, Blancpain formally presented him as an ambassador associated with its ocean-conservation activities.
