= Fichte (surname) =

Fichte is a German-language surname:

- Johann Gottlieb Fichte (1762–1814), German philosopher
- Hubert Fichte (1935–1986), German writer
- Immanuel Hermann Fichte (1796–1879), German theologian and philosopher, son of Johann Gottlieb Fichte

== See also ==
- Fichtl
- Fichtel (surname)
- Fichte (surname)
- Fichten
- Fichtenholz
- Fichter
- Fichtner
- Fichtenbauer
