= Fichtl =

Fichtl is a German-language surname. Notable people with this surname include:

- Jiří Fichtl (1921–2003), Czech chess player
- Paula Fichtl (1902–1989), Sigmund Freud's housekeeper, the author of memoirs about Freud's family

== Fictional characters ==
- Michael Fichtl from German TV series Tatort

== See also ==
- Fichtl
- Fichtel (surname)
- Fichte (surname)
- Fichten
- Fichtenholz
- Fichter
- Fichtner
- Fichtenbauer
