= Card money in New France =

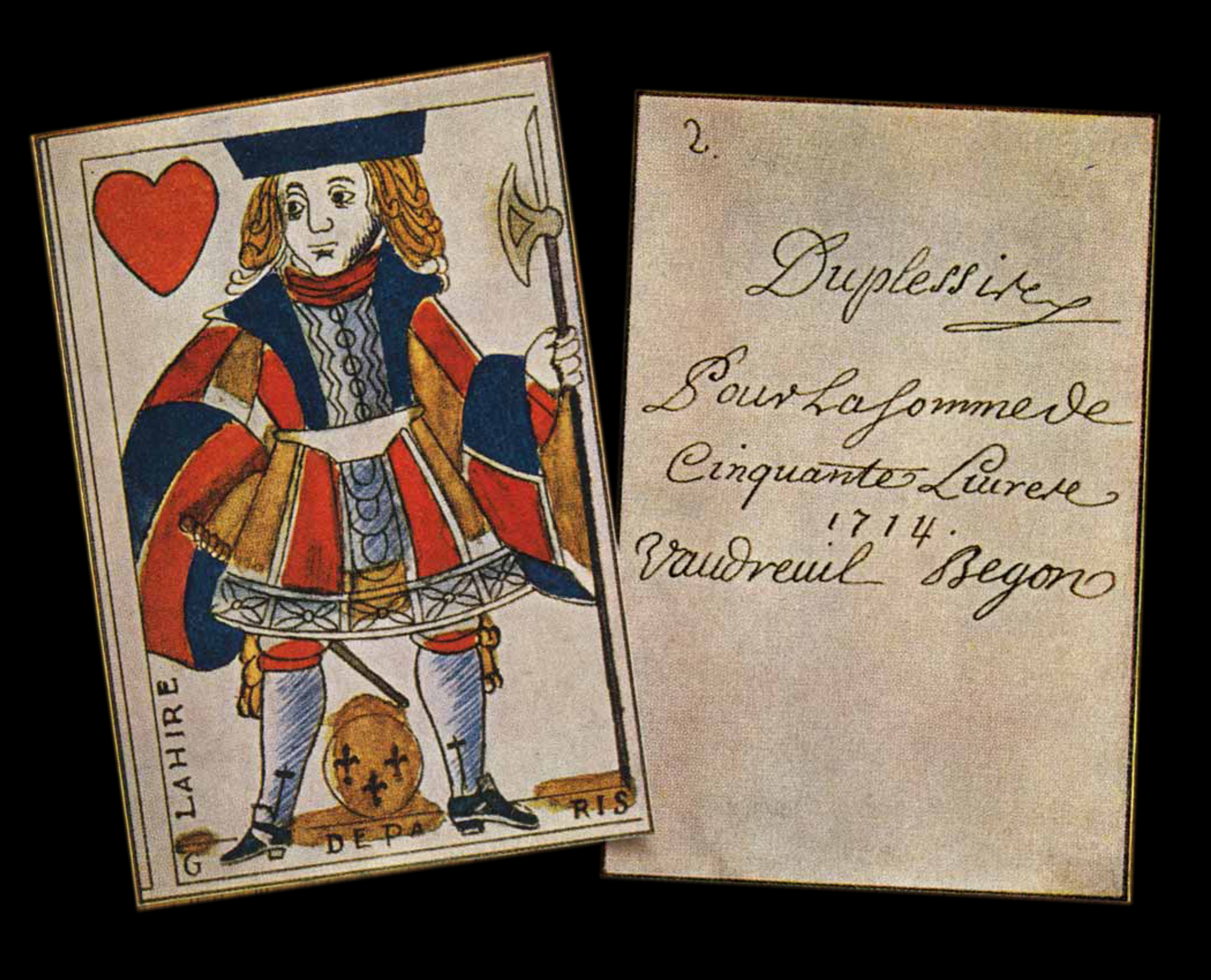
A 1714 playing card had the same currency value in the colony of New France as minted currency.

Card money was in use in New France in the seventeenth and eighteenth centuries. Official money cards were embossed with a fleur-de-lis and the signatures of the intendant, governor, and treasurer. Private cards also used the fleur-de-lis and the signature of its debtor. Card money was generally issued, at least initially, in emergencies when minted currency was in low supply; however, over time "playing cards" became more popular and the standard tender. An estimated two million livres in card money is thought to have circulated prior to the British takeover of New France territory in the 1760s.

== Historical context ==
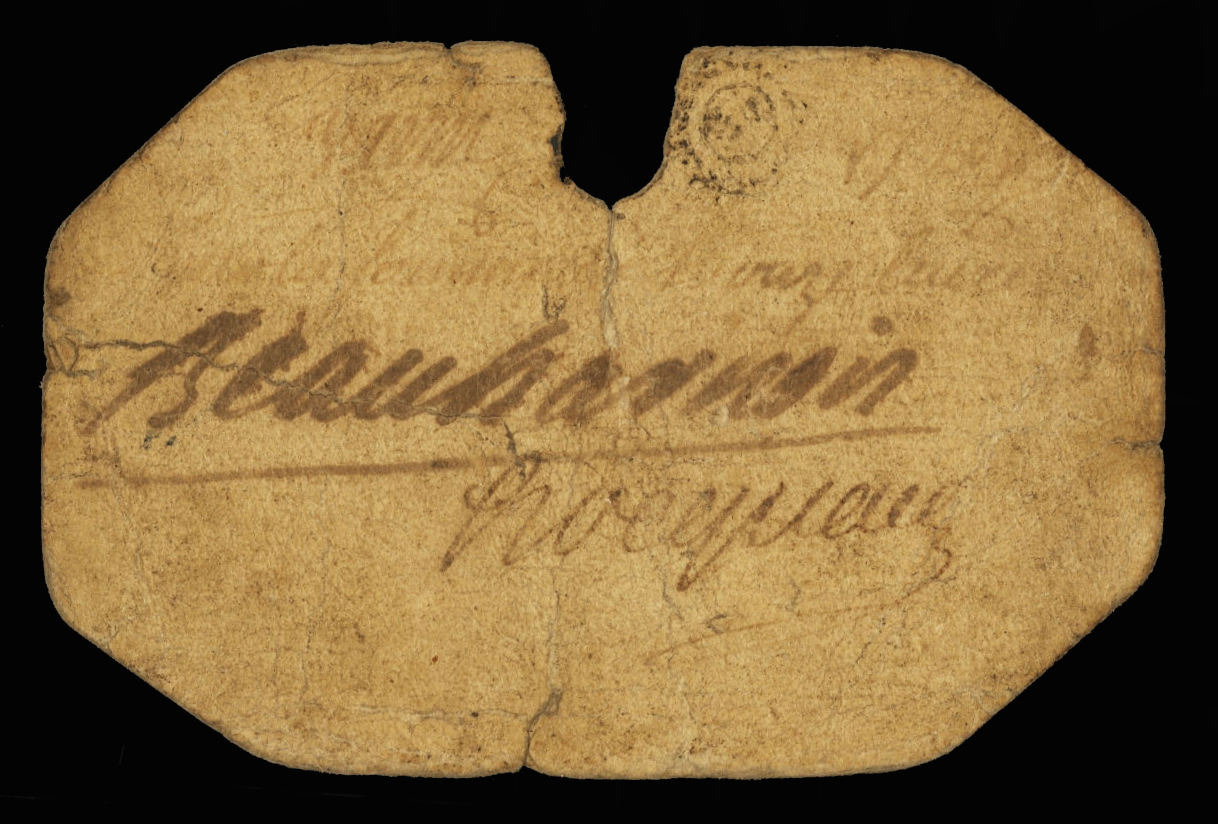
A twelve-livre card from Canada, New France, c. 1735

The growth of French colonization, which began about the middle of the seventeenth century, was accompanied by continual difficulty in finding sufficient currency for the needs of settlers, merchants and government establishments. The government of France, involved in almost continuous financial difficulties on its own account, was extremely hard pressed to finance the support and development of its outposts in New France. In 1685, the colonial authorities in New France found themselves particularly insolvent. A military expedition against the Iroquois, allies of the English, had gone badly and tax revenues were up owing to the curtailment of the beaver trade because of illegal trading with the English.

As nearly everything in common use in New France had to be imported and purchased from France, the colony's export revenue fell far short of its expenditure on imported goods. As a result, not only were funds hard to come by, but the scarcity of actual currency and coinage in New France created a persistent problem in daily transactions.

Typically, when short of funds, the government simply delayed paying merchants for their purchases until a fresh supply of specie arrived from France. The payment of soldiers however, could not be postponed. Having exhausted all other financial avenues, Jacques de Meulles, intendant of justice, police and finance in New France, was desperate for a solution. This quandary is recorded in a letter that de Meulles wrote to the Count de Toulouse, Secretary of State for the Department of Marine in Paris on September 29, 1685. The document below contains the first recorded mention of card money.

"I have found myself this year in great straits with regard to the subsistence of the soldiers. You did not provide for funds, my Lord, until January last. I have, notwithstanding, kept them in provisions until September, which makes eight full months. I have drawn upon my own funds and from those of my friends, all I have been able to get, but at last finding them without means to render me further assistance, and not knowing to what saint to say my vows, money being extremely scarce, having distributed considerable sums on every side for the pay of the soldiers, it occurred to me to issue, instead of money, notes on cards, which I have cut in quarters. ... I have issued an ordinance by which I have obliged all the inhabitants to receive this money in payments, and to give it circulation, at the same time pledging myself, in my own name, to redeem the said notes."

Although card money began as a short-term financial device, it was not long before the cards began to circulate among people as a medium of common exchange and later issues of card money were provided with this specific aim in mind. Over time, card money became an integral part of the currency of French Canada and remained in circulation until the fall of Quebec in 1759.

== Use and regulation ==
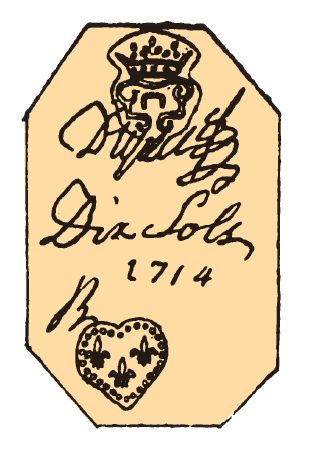
January 1, 1714, playing card of New France

Initially, card money was issued in three denominations, in the form of singular playing cards bearing the intendant's arms and signature. It was backed by the private promise of redemption, and readily accepted. However, due to its widespread monetary use, a significant amount of card money failed to be submitted for reimbursement and remained circulating. This meant that the government was able to increase its expenses. As a result, card money was used as currency in Canada intermittently for the remainder of the French regime.

As a financial tool, card money played a significant role as a means of exchange. Despite the worries of French officials, colonial authorities were successful in arguing that card money served as a financial medium in Canada just as coinage did in France. An economic substitute to the dangerous transfer of specie across the Atlantic, card money allowed France to benefit, since the King did not have the obligation to send coinage to Canada, which would have risked loss "either from the sea or from enemies".

== Counterfeit ==
In the fall of 1685, once the first issue of card money had been redeemed, Jacques de Meulles wrote of his experiment in a report to the home government: "No person has refused [the card money], and so good has been the effect that by this means the troops have lived as usual". Upon receiving this report, the king condemned the issue of card money for two reasons; firstly, that so easy a method of raising temporary funds would lead to extravagant expenditure in the colonies, for which he would be responsible when card money was withdrawn from circulation; and secondly, that the cards would be easy to counterfeit. The king's initial concern proved to be a considerably greater problem than the latter. However, forgeries of later issues of card money periodically caused a stir in the colonies, and measures for dealing with those responsible had to be developed.

According to judicial records, counterfeiting was among the most common crimes committed in seventeenth-century New France, but its incidence was less than that of rape, abortion, or even bestiality. Nonetheless, apprehended counterfeiters were harshly dealt with, the first punishments including caning, branding, banishment, the galleys, and public shaming. As early as 1690, a "surgeon" is recorded as convicted of counterfeiting in Quebec City. After being severely flogged and whipped, the man was sold into bondage for three years, but subsequent offenders received the penalty for counterfeiting which was later changed to death by hanging.

A colourful account of one large-scale counterfeiting operation is given in the memoir of Lieutenant Jean-François-Benjamin Dumont de Montigny, an officer in the French colonial navy who spent two years stationed (though often bedridden with illness) in Quebec City. In October 1716, four soldiers from Montreal convened with the intention to counterfeit 80,000 livres in card money. The group consisted of a skilled engraver, a scribe to forge the seals of the governor and intendant, a drummer to conceal the sounds of cards being stamped, and the sergeant major, who would exchange the real cards for counterfeits when collecting the pay for the garrison. Not altogether surprisingly, the scheme lasted only two months, since the men were unaccustomed to wealth, and therefore indiscreet with their money. All four were imprisoned and sentenced to death, but were somehow smuggled files to cut their chains and escaped on a fishing boat back to France. While it must be assumed that Dumont embellished parts of the story for the purpose of entertainment, court records validate most of its major events. However, it must also be assumed that most counterfeiting took place on a far smaller scale and was underreported, as some historians claim that such activity was so rare as to have never been a major problem.

== Decline ==
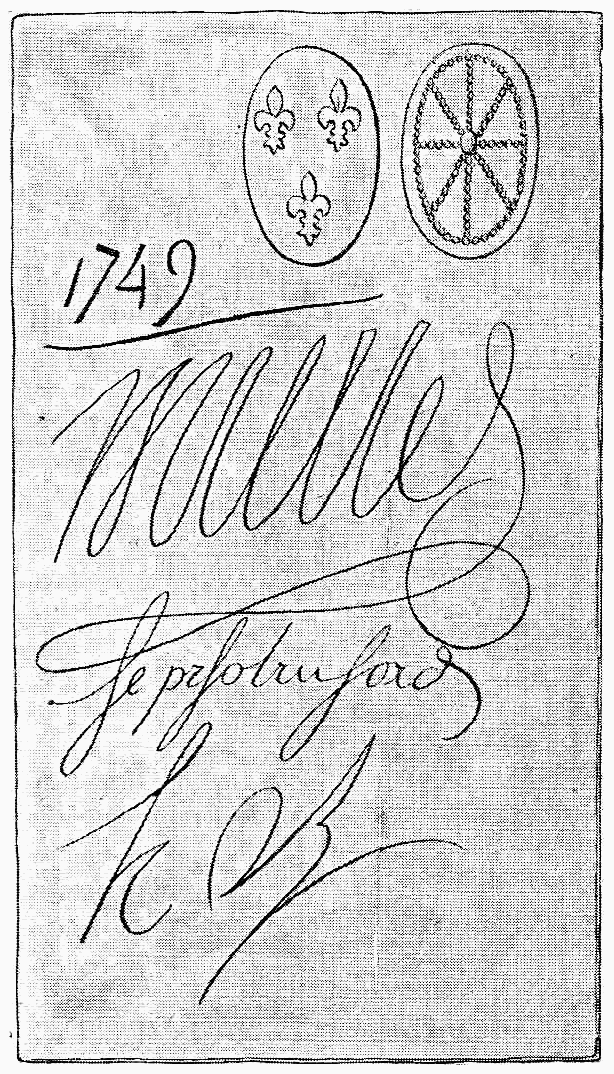
1749 money card from New France

Problems arose as cards began to be over-issued in order to compensate for the failing economy in France. Many cards were not being returned for redemption each year, nor were they always redeemable when they should have been. As war expenses in Europe began to surpass the annual allowance, fewer and fewer supplies (especially in the form of coin) were sent to New France. Meanwhile, the habitants or settlers of New France were able to conduct most of their business through the fur trade, and therefore were not necessarily in need of coinage; because of this, they had a habit of hoarding what coins they acquired, which greatly decreased the amount of coin circulation in the economy and lead to further financial problems. This was a recurring trend throughout the seventeenth and eighteenth centuries.

In the early 1690s, due to excessive issuance of card money, inflation began to increase perceptibly. At the beginning of the eighteenth century, due to ongoing wars in Europe, the financial aid to the French colonies decreased, meaning that goods were regularly shipped in place of currency. This caused a higher reliance on card money as a form of payment. By 1705, card money had become official tender and was relied upon to pay building costs as well as soldiers' pay. As cards continued to be redeemed at full face value, supply far outweighed the demand and in 1717 it was decided that card money would be redeemed at a 50% discount and withdrawn from circulation.

The withdrawal of card money in 1717 without a valid replacement left New France in recession. In 1722 there was an attempt to introduce copper coins; however, they were not widely accepted, especially by merchants, and therefore were discontinued. Finally in 1727, in response to the demands of the merchants, the king re-issued card money as the official tender of New France. This new reissued card money was printed on plain card stock without colours and was marked for value by either cutting or removing the corners from the cards. The new card money would be redeemed each year for goods or bills of exchange, which could be redeemed in France. Unfortunately, the new card money quickly gave rise to the same issues as before, and during the War of the Spanish Succession finances in France went from bad to bankruptcy. By 1757, the government of New France had discontinued all payments made in specie and was relying on card money, ordonnances (promissory notes from the government) and treasury notes in order to fund operations within the colony.

By 1750, there had been a rapid increase in paper money circulation due to costs acquired from the war with Great Britain. Declining tax revenues and corruption lead to rapid inflation, and a letter from the Marquis de Montcalm in April 1759 stated that necessary life provisions cost eight times more than they had in 1755. By this point, card money had acquired the same value as cash, so the habitants began hoarding it as well, causing a sudden drop in the amount of card money in circulation. On October 15, 1759, the French government decided to suspend the payment of bills of exchange from the treasury for payment of expenses of Canada until three months after peace had been restored.

After the British conquest in 1760, French Canadians still held about 16 million livres' worth of paper money, with about 3.8 percent of it being card money. Paper money had become essentially worthless, with hoarded coin and silver beginning to come back into circulation. British merchants eventually began to accept card money and other forms of paper money at the rate of 80–85% After three years of discussion, Versailles agreed to reimburse the cards – now mostly in the hands of British merchants – at one fourth of the original value. By 1771, France was essentially bankrupt and all card money was deemed worthless.
