= Fichtel (disambiguation) =

Fichtel may refer to:

- Fichtel Mountains
- Fichtel (surname)

== See also ==
- Fichtel & Sachs a German family business, today mostly known in automotive industry
