= Fichter =

Fichter is a surname of German origin. Notable people with the surname include:

- Friedrich Fichter (1869–1952), Swiss professor of chemistry
- Hermann Fichter (1845–1912), American soldier during the Apache Wars
- Jennifer Fichter (born 1984), high school teacher convicted of sexual battery
- John Fichter (1935–2014), Republican member of the Pennsylvania House of Representatives
- Mike Fichter (born 1974), former Major League Baseball umpire
- Robert W. Fichter (born 1939), American photographer
- Eugen Fichter (born 1979), Russian Businessman

== See also ==
- Fichtl
- Fichtel (surname)
- Fichte (surname)
- Fichten
- Fichtenholz
- Fichter
- Fichtner
- Fichtenbauer
