= Fichtel (surname) =

Fichtel is a German-language surname.

- Anja Fichtel, German fencer
- Brad Fichtel, American footballer
- Bronisław Fichtel, Polish footballer
- Johann Ehrenwerth Fichtel (1732–1795) Austrian mineralogist and civil servant
- Klaus Fichtel, German footballer
- Leopold von Fichtel (1770–1810), Austrian paleontologist

== See also ==
- Fichtl
- Fichtel (surname)
- Fichte (surname)
- Fichten
- Fichtenholz
- Fichter
- Fichtner
- Fichtenbauer
