= México Pelágico =

- Film poster
- Directed by: Jerónimo Prieto
- Distributed by: Calypso Media
- Release date: 30 October 2014
- Running time: 69 minutes
- Country: Mexico
- Language: Spanish / English

México Pelágico is a 2014 Mexican documentary film. It was written by Jerónimo Prieto, who also directed it. It portrays the life of the open ocean of Mexico through the eyes of young conservationists. Jorge Cervera Hauser served as a producer.

It received the Director's Award at the 12th San Francisco International Ocean Film Festival in early 2015, and an audience award for "Best Environmental Film" at the 2015 Vail Film Festival.
