= Betty Fiechter =

Swiss businesswoman (1896–1971)

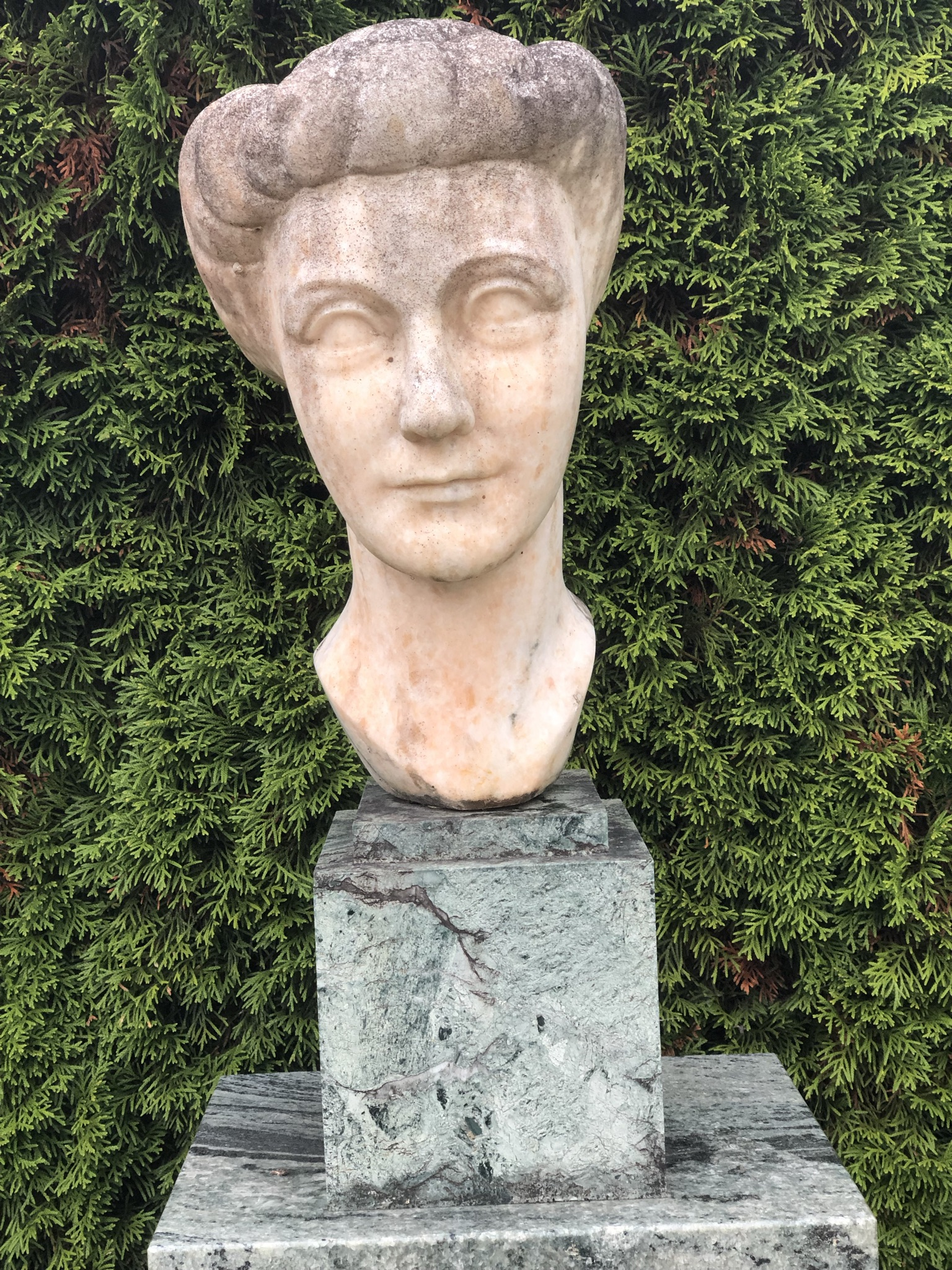
- A bust of Fiechter in her hometown of Villeret, Switzerland
- Born: Berthe-Marie Fiechter; April 29, 1896; Villeret, Switzerland
- Died: September 14, 1971 (aged 75); Bienne, Switzerland
- Occupation: Businesswoman
- Years active: 1912-1971
- Employer: Blancpain

Betty Fiechter, born Berthe-Marie Fiechter (April 29, 1896 – September 14, 1971) was a Swiss businesswoman. She was known for her tenure as director of luxury watch manufacturer Blancpain.

== Life ==
=== Early life and career beginnings ===
Fietcher was born to Jacob and Mary Fietcher in Villeret, Switzerland on April 29, 1896. Her father owned a watch movement company, which sparked Fietcher's interest in watches. Fiechter first joined Blancpain as an apprentice in 1912 as part of her trade school curriculum. Two years later, Blancpain purchased her father's company and Fiechter joined full-time. The company had been owned by the same family since its founding in 1735 and Fiechter grew close to the owner, Frédéric-Emile Blancpain.

During World War I, Fiechter volunteered as a nurse in Saint-Imier, where she met Andre Léal. Léal would go on to work at Blancpain as a salesman. She continued to work at Blancpain during this time and became assistant to the company's owner in 1915, who personally trained her to lead the company's workshops.

=== Leadership of Blancpain ===
After Blancpain's death in 1932, Fiechter became the company's director and co-owner alongside André Léal. Without a member of the Blancpain family involved in the company, the pair renamed the company Rayville S.A. After Léal died in 1939, Fiechter became the company's sole owner. As director, she emphasized creating women's watches and was known for having a stern-but-fair attitude towards her employees. Under her leadership, the company created multiple new watches that had wide appeal, including the Fifty Fathoms diving watch.

In the 1960s, Fiechter led a merger between Blancpain and several other manufacturers into a single company called the Société Suisse pour l'Industrie Horlogère. The merger allowed each manufacturer to retain a clear identity while benefiting from the financial support of the other manufacturers. Fiechter's impact on the Swiss watchmaking industry was widespread, with her nephew Jean-Jacques joking in 1984 that "the downfall of the Swiss watchmaking industry coincided with an all-male recruitment drive."

=== Personal life and death ===
Fiechter did not marry but had a partner who was killed in an accident in the early stages of her time as director. She was close to her nieces and nephews, eventually partnering with her nephew Jean-Jacques to run the company when she became ill. Fiechter died in Bienne, Switzerland on September 14, 1971. A marble bust of Fiechter, commissioned by two of her nephews, was erected in her hometown of Villeret in 1996. A second monument was created in 2021 by Swiss artist Helena von Beust and consists of a life-size statue of Fiechter and an accompanying biographical video. The monument stands in Villeret's town square.
