= Arnold Fiechter =

Swiss painter and teacher (1879–1943)

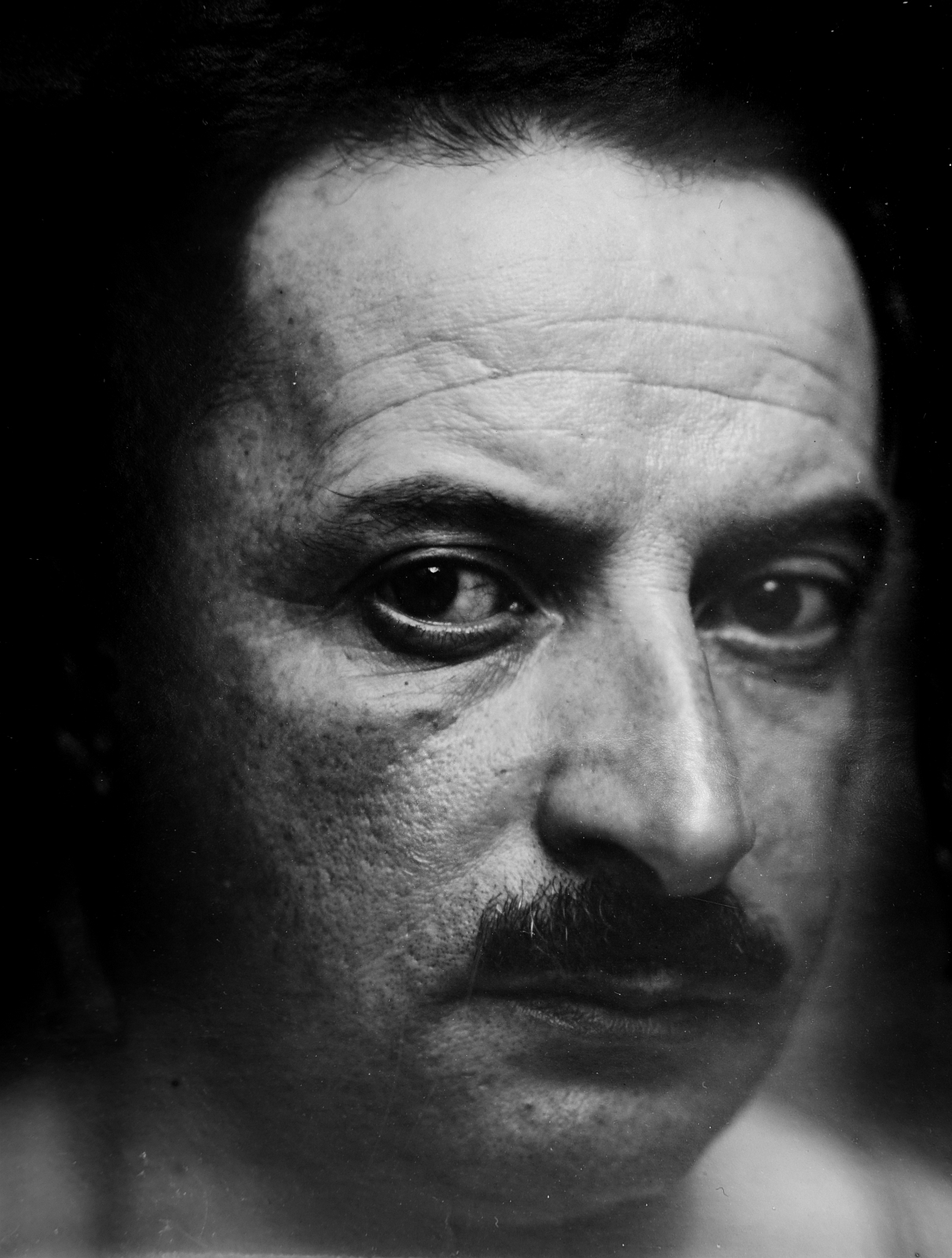
Arnold Fiechter

Gustav Arnold Fiechter (18 July 1879 – 5 April 1943) was a Swiss painter and teacher at the trade school in Basel.

== Biography ==
Arnold Fiechter was born in Sissach and grew up there with his sister Elise (1875–1962). His mother died in 1891, and his father, Arnold Fiechter-Niederhauser, married the widow Elisabeth Schneider. A short time later they moved to Basel.

From 1894 to 1897, Fiechter completed an apprenticeship as a flat painter in Sarnen, and worked as a decorative painter in Central Switzerland. He then studied at the Basel vocational school under Fritz Schider. During this time he met Alfred Bloesch (1890–1967), with whom he had a lifelong friendship. At 20 years old, Fiechter was able to exhibit his watercolors at the Kunsthalle Basel. He died in 1943 in Basel.
