= Jehan-Jacques Blancpain =

Swiss watchmaker (born 1963)

Jehan-Jacques Blancpain (born 1693) was a Swiss industrialist at the beginning of the eighteenth century. Blancpain is a notable figure in the history of watchmaking, who created the Blancpain in 1735 (the oldest registered watch brand in the world), in the town of Villeret, of which he was mayor.
