= Oliver Fiechter =

Swiss economic philosopher

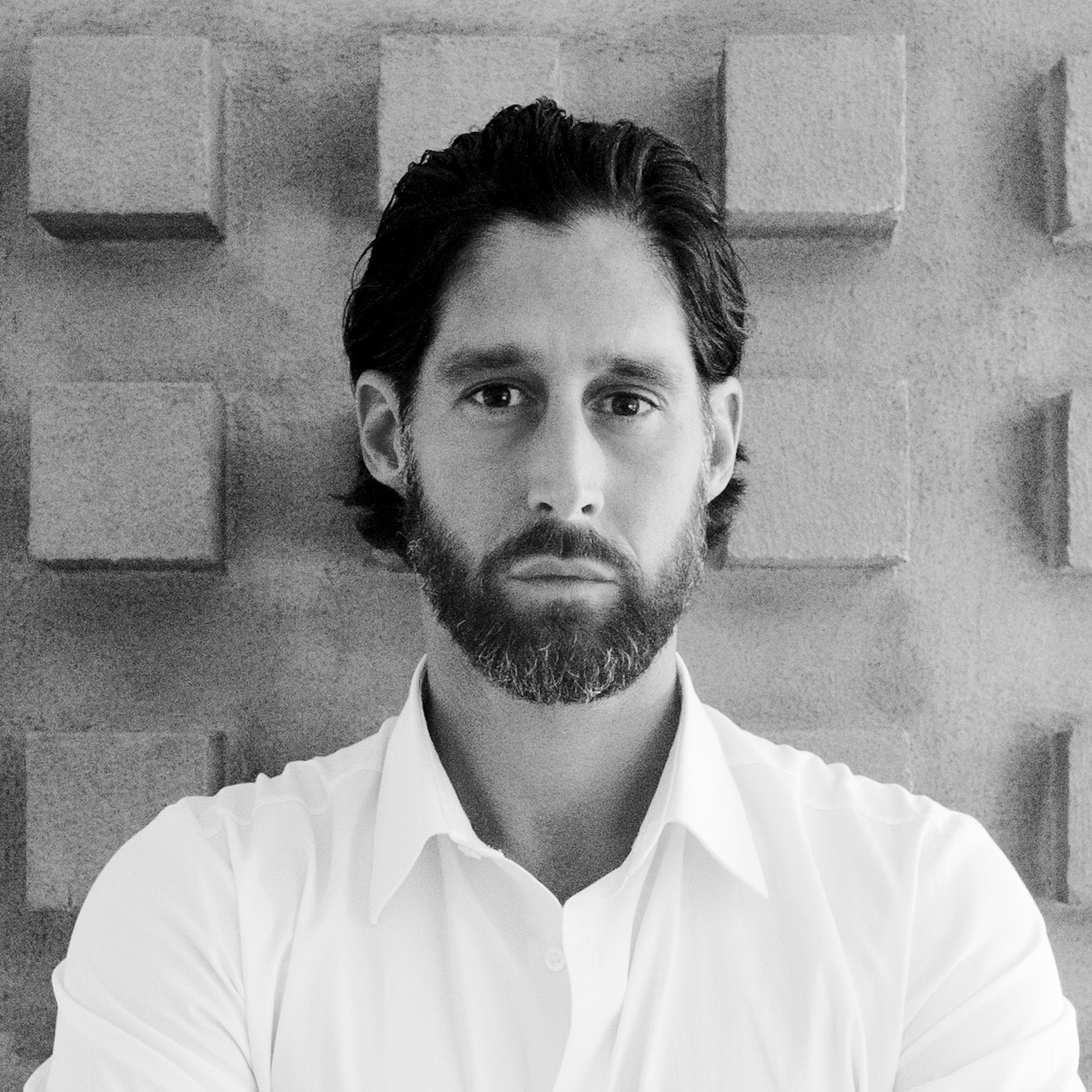
- Born: April 30, 1972 (age 54); Buenos Aires, Argentina
- Occupations: Writer, digital innovationist, investor

Oliver Fiechter (born April 30, 1972) is a Swiss writer, entrepreneur, and economic philosopher, associated with the theory of Economy 3.0. He is author of the books We Are The Economy! (2012) and Aufstieg der digitalen Stammesgesellschaft: Die neue grosse Transformation (Rise of the Digital Tribal Society) (2016).

== Early life ==
Fiechter was born in Buenos Aires, Argentina on April 30, 1972. In the early 1980s, Fiechter's family fled Argentina for political reasons, and returned to Switzerland. Fiechter struggled to integrate into Swiss schooling and culture, which he later attributed to his early interest in adaptive learning. In his book We Are The Economy! (2012), Fiechter advocates individualized lifelong learning that "develops constructive critical thinking and individual development". He has argued that in order to adapt to increasing digitalization, education will have to shift away from standardization towards fostering individual creativity and innovation.

== Career ==
=== ISG Institute ===
In 2008, Fiechter founded the ISG Institute in St. Gallen, a Swiss-based think-tank which develops methodology and tools that enable companies to measure and report "soft factors" and individual preferences of customers and staff. These methodologies approach companies as complex social organizations, and attempt to integrate intangible non-financial assets with financial assets to assess value and identify risks and potentials in companies. In 2009, the ISG Institute partnered with the Swiss economist Cuno Pümpin. to research the quality of decision-making when using the ISG methodology.

Fiechter's clients include PricewaterhouseCoopers (PwC) and Ernst & Young (EY), and he developed the 'Hidden Champion 3.0 Award' for the Austrian Ministry of Commerce, which rates export-oriented companies according to the Economy 3.0 rating criteria. Fiechter developed a rating approach for the sustainable rating and valuation of financial products for the government of Liechtenstein's Carlo Foundation. Fiechter is also general director of M&H Equity AG, an international private equity investment company which uses ISG methodology.

Fiechter remains chairman of the institute.

=== Other ===
Fiechter is a co-founder of Production 3.0 GmbH, a private equity firm.

Fiechter has been involved with the Clinton Global Initiative since 2016.

In 2025, Fiechter developed the "Kipuka Treasury Model".

== Books ==
=== Economy 3.0 ===
In his 2012 book, he explains his economic philosophy, Economy 3.0, based on his belief in "stakeholder value management", (contrasted with "financial value management"). He argues that the purpose of a company or organization is to produce value for all stakeholders, including customers, employees, shareholders, suppliers, local communities, and society, rather than focusing solely on maximizing profits and shareholder value. Fiechter's argues that the Shareholder Value movement contributed substantially to the 2008 financial crisis, and has reached its limits. He proposes that advancing communication technologies, digitalization and peer-to-peer networks can shift the balance of power towards individuals, creating a new decentralized economic order controlled by the people, in which networks of clients and stakeholders collaborate and co-create to improve society. This future global economic and social order would be defined by a transparent digital barter society, based on reciprocity, equality, and cooperation instead of competition.

Based on the ‘Economy 3.0’ theory, Fiechter invented a management-, strategy- and controlling-methodology for human-centered corporate management.

== Bibliography ==
- We are the Economy! The Emergence of a New Social Order in the Age of the Freelance Economy. Stämpfli Verlag AG (2012). ASIN: B00B9MTS7Y
- Rise of the Digital Tribal Society. Neue Zürcher Zeitung NZZ Libro (2016). ISBN 978-3038101901
