= Ullrich Fichtner =

German journalist (born 1965)

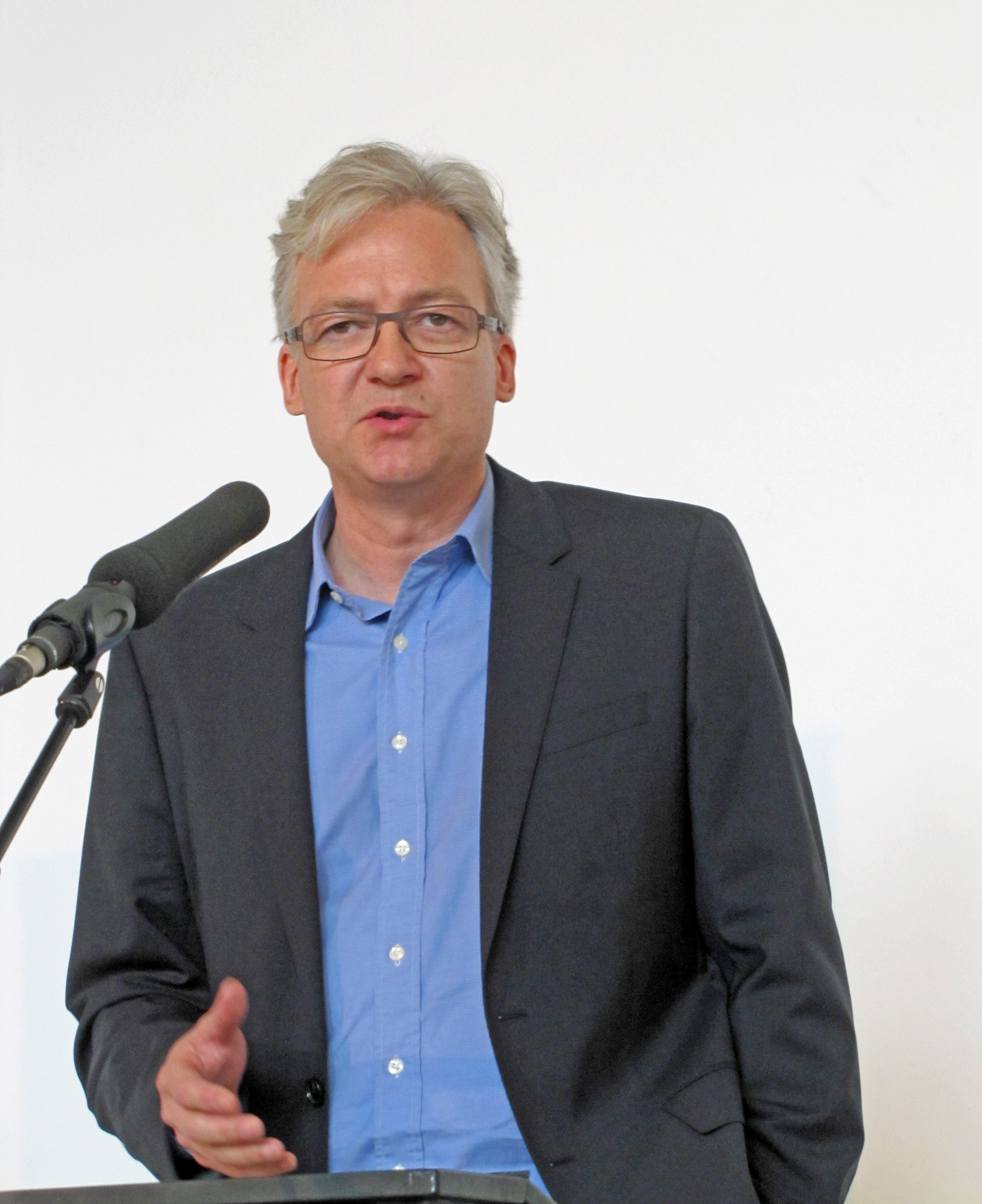

Ullrich Fichtner (born May 8, 1965, in Hof, Germany) is a senior German journalist and reporter-at-large of Der Spiegel magazine.

== Work ==
Ullrich Fichtner started his career during high school, contributing articles to local newspapers. During his university studies in Bremen and Berlin he worked as a freelance journalist for The Associated Press, covering the fall of the Berlin Wall in November 1989 and the breakdown of the communist-led East German State.

As a Berlin correspondent of the national daily Frankfurter Rundschau, he followed Germany's reunification process and portrayed Berlin as an emerging capital city of Europe. In 2000, he joined the national weekly Die Zeit as a junior editor.

In 2001, he was hired as a reporter-at-large by Der Spiegel, one of Europe's largest and most influential news magazines. He contributed largely to Spiegel's in-depth investigation of the 9/11 terror attacks, focussing on Mohamed Atta's leading role in the plot.

As a world affairs reporter, he intensely covered the Iraq and the Afghanistan Wars, portraying the commanding US general David H. Petraeus on several occasions. His features were widely discussed not only in Europe, but also in the US. Other main stories dealt with the Middle Eastern peace process and the impact of China's rise.

Based in Paris, France, from 2002 to 2010, he was Spiegel's New York correspondent from 2011 to 2013. From 2014 to 2016, he was in charge of Spiegel's reportage department and then returned to the field as a reporter-at-large. Since 2019, he has again been based in Paris.

He is an author and co-author of several books. His essay "Tellergericht", a critical survey of Germany's food culture, helped foster a nationwide debate over culinary habits.

== Awards ==
For his work, Fichtner has received all of the major German prizes for excellence in journalism. In 2000, 2001 and 2004, he won the Egon Erwin Kisch Prize for the "Best Reportage of the Year". In 2005, he and a team of colleagues were awarded a Henri Nannen Prize for their investigation into the terrorist attack on a school in Beslan, Russia. In May 2009, he and a team of colleagues received another Nannen-Preis for a 35-pages report about the roots and reasons of the financial crisis. His third Nannen-Preis, in 2011, was for an in-depth story about a German-led military strike against civilians near the Afghan city of Kunduz. In 2012, he and a team of Spiegel writers won another Nannen-Preis for a report-at-large about the Euro currency turning into "the most dangerous currency of the world". In 2017, Fichtner et al. won a Deutscher Reporterpreis for a story about the German saga of building a new international airport in Berlin-Schönefeld.

== Books ==
- Inside 9-11: What Really Happened, St. Martin's Paperbacks, 2002, ISBN 0-312-98748-X
- Tellergericht. Die Deutschen und das Essen, Deutsche Verlags-Anstalt, München 2004, ISBN 3-421-05586-6
