= Mike Fichter =

American baseball umpire (born 1974)

- Born: Michael James Fichter; May 1, 1974 (age 52); Lansing, Illinois, U.S.
- Occupation: Major League Baseball umpire
- Years active: 1999–2005

Michael James Fichter (born May 1, 1974) is an American former Major League Baseball (MLB) umpire who also served as an umpire in college baseball. As an MLB umpire, he wore number 80 on his uniform.

Fichter, who was born in Illinois in 1974, umpired in the American League in 1999, then as a member of the combined MLB umpiring staff worked another 594 games during the 2000 to 2005 seasons. In his 594 total games officiated, he issued 12 ejections, three coming as the result of a bench-clearing brawl between the Detroit Tigers and Kansas City Royals in August 2001. Fichter was the first base umpire for the final Montreal Expos home game on September 29, 2004. The Florida Marlins defeated the Expos 9–1. On June 25, 2002, Fichter was the home plate umpire at Yankee Stadium for an MLB record 6-pitcher combined no-hitter by the Houston Astros vs. the New York Yankees. The Astros won the game 2–0. Fichter was also the home plate umpire for New York Yankees pitcher Mike Mussina's near-perfect game against the Boston Red Sox at Fenway Park on September 2, 2001. Mussina was one strike away from a perfect game when Boston Red Sox batter Carl Everett flared an opposite field line drive just in front of New York Yankees left fielder Chuck Knoblauch. Fichter resides in Bolingbrook, Illinois and has one son (Zachary) and a daughter (Olivia). Following his MLB umpiring career, Fichter works as an avid umpire clinician, and for a sports equipment manufacturer in which he was an instrumental part of its success by bringing the company to the Major League Baseball level.

== See also ==
- Lists of Major League Baseball umpires
