= Blancpain =

Swiss luxury watchmaker founded in 1735

Coordinates: 46.57977°N 6.21312°E

Blancpain SA
- Type: Subsidiary
- Industry: Luxury watchmaking
- Founded: 1735 (291 years ago), in Villeret, Switzerland
- Founder: Jehan-Jacques Blancpain
- Headquarters: Paudex/Le Brassus, Switzerland
- Area served: Worldwide
- Key people: Marc Hayek
- Products: Tourbillon, watches, clocks
- Parent: The Swatch Group
- Website: blancpain.ch

Blancpain SA (French pronunciation: [blɑ̃pɛ̃]) is a Swiss luxury watch manufacturer, headquartered in Paudex/Le Brassus, Switzerland. It designs, manufactures, distributes, and sells prestige and luxury mechanical watches. Founded by Jehan-Jacques Blancpain in Villeret, Switzerland, in 1735, Blancpain is the oldest registered watch brand in the world. Blancpain has been a subsidiary of the Swiss Swatch Group since 1992, and is regarded as a top-tier watch brand.

It is best known for its Fifty Fathoms diving watch introduced in 1953 (disputed claim), and its 1735 Grand complication wristwatch, introduced in 1991.

== History ==
=== Early history ===
Jehan-Jacques Blancpain started making watches in 1735 in Villeret, Switzerland. He founded the Blancpain brand, setting up his first workshop on the upper floor of his house at Villeret, in the present-day Bernese Jura. This part of the history is disputed. According to Perezcope, there is no evidence that Jehan-Jacques Blancpain and the following two generations were watchmakers. In 1815, Frédéric-Louis Blancpain, the grandson of Jehan-Jacques, who was head of the family business at the time, modernized the workshops in Villeret. By replacing the crown-wheel mechanism with a cylinder escapement, Frédéric-Louis introduced a major innovation into the watchmaking world.

In 1865, as industrialisation took hold, the prices of watchmaking products were falling and many workshops were fated to close down. To counter American competition, Blancpain built a two-storey hydroelectric plant by the River Suze, and made use of water power to supply the electricity needed for its production processes. By modernizing its methods and concentrating on top-of-the-line products, Blancpain became one of the few watchmaking firms to survive in Villeret.

=== Re-organization ===
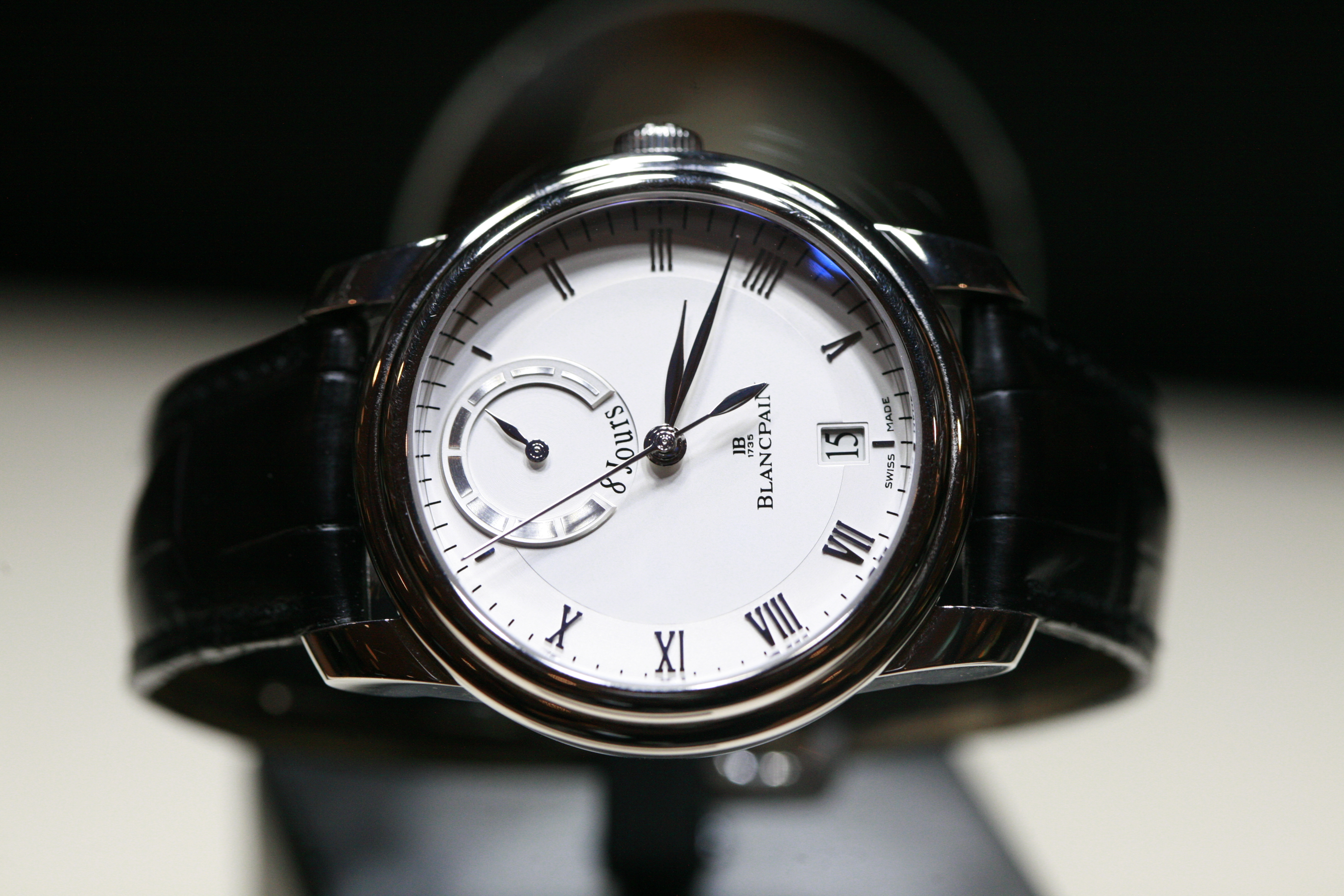
Blancpain watch with 8-day power reserve.

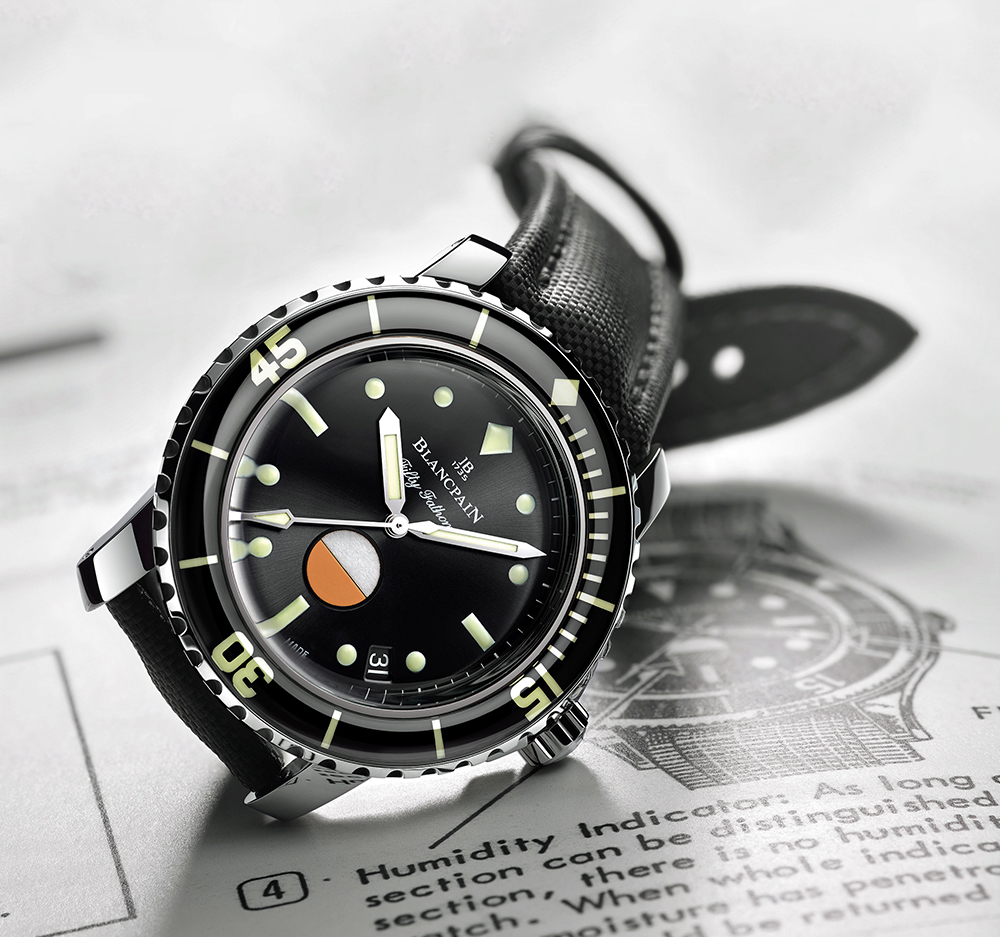
Blancpain Fifty Fathoms Automatique diving watch. The Fifty Fathoms model family was introduced in the mid 1950s.

In 1926, the Manufacture entered into a partnership with John Harwood and started marketing the first automatic wristwatch. The year 1932 saw the end of the family's management of the firm, which had lasted for over two centuries. On the death of Frédéric-Emile Blancpain, his only daughter, Berthe-Nellie, did not wish to go into watchmaking. The following year, the two members of the staff who had been closest to Frédéric-Emile, Betty Fiechter and André Léal, bought the business. As there was no longer any member of the Blancpain family in control of the firm, the two associates were obliged by law as it stood at the time to change the company name. The firm would be called Rayville S.A., succ. de Blancpain, "Rayville" being a phonetic anagram of Villeret. Despite this change of name, the identity of the Manufacture was perpetuated, and the characteristics of the brand were preserved.

Betty Fiechter remained director of Blancpain until 1950, when her nephew, Jean-Jacques Fiechter, joined her. At the end of the 1950s, Rayville-Blancpain was producing more than 100,000 watches per year. To make it possible to meet the continually growing demand, the firm became part of the SSIH, joining such brands as Omega SA, Tissot and Lemania. In 1971, the company's annual production reached the historical peak of 220,000 watches. During the quartz crisis of the 1970s, SSIH was forced to reduce its output by half and to sell off part of its assets. In 1975 SSIH transitioned Blancpain from watch brand to movement manufacturer for Omega and quartz pocket watch maker for Moeris. By 1980 the brand had been dissolved and totally absorbed by Omega, even the factory, was repurposed to serve Omega's jewelry department. In 1982, Omega withdrew from Villeret, Switzerland, abandoning the former Rayville factory completely.

=== Recent development ===
In 1983 the current iteration of Blancpain was born when SSIH sold the Rayville-Blancpain name to Jacques Piguet, son of Frédéric Piguet and director of the company of that name, and Jean-Claude Biver, at that time employed by the SSIH. The company set up production at Le Brassus, in the Joux Valley, and from then on traded under the name of Blancpain SA.

In 1992, the SSIH purchased Blancpain back for 60 million Swiss Francs. At that time, Blancpain had annual sales of 50 million Swiss Francs. Biver remained as CEO of Blancpain until 2002. Marc Hayek, the grandson of Swatch Group's founder and chairman Nicolas Hayek (1928–2010), has run Blancpain since 2002.

Later, SSIH became known as Swatch Group, and in July 2010, Frédéric Piguet SA, also owned by Swatch Group, was merged into the firm Blancpain SA. Currently, Blancpain is an active member of the Federation of the Swiss Watch Industry FH.

== Motto and slogan ==
One of Blancpain's company slogans is "Blancpain has never made a quartz watch and never will."

== Watch manufacturing ==
According to their commercial slogans, the company has never produced quartz watches in the past and has stated in its advertisements that it never will, nor have they ever produced watches with digital displays. In comparison to a large watchmaker like Rolex, which makes about 2,000 watches a day, Blancpain produces fewer than thirty watches per day. Each watch is made by a single watchmaker.

=== Important inventions and patents ===
- In 1983, created the world's smallest moon-phases display.
- In 1987, created the world's thinnest self-winding chronograph and the smallest minute-repeater movement at the time.
- In 1988, created the world's thinnest split-second chronograph at the time.
- In 2000, produced the world's first self-winding tourbillon and perpetual calendar, with an eight-day power reserve.
- In 2005, patented the system of under-lug correctors.
- In 2006, patented the "rail effect" stone-setting technique.
- In 2006, created the Tourbillon Semainier, an unprecedented combination of complications with a seven-day power reserve.
- In 2008, produced the world's first movement with a one-minute flying carousel and 100-hour power reserve.

== Notable models ==
=== Villeret ===
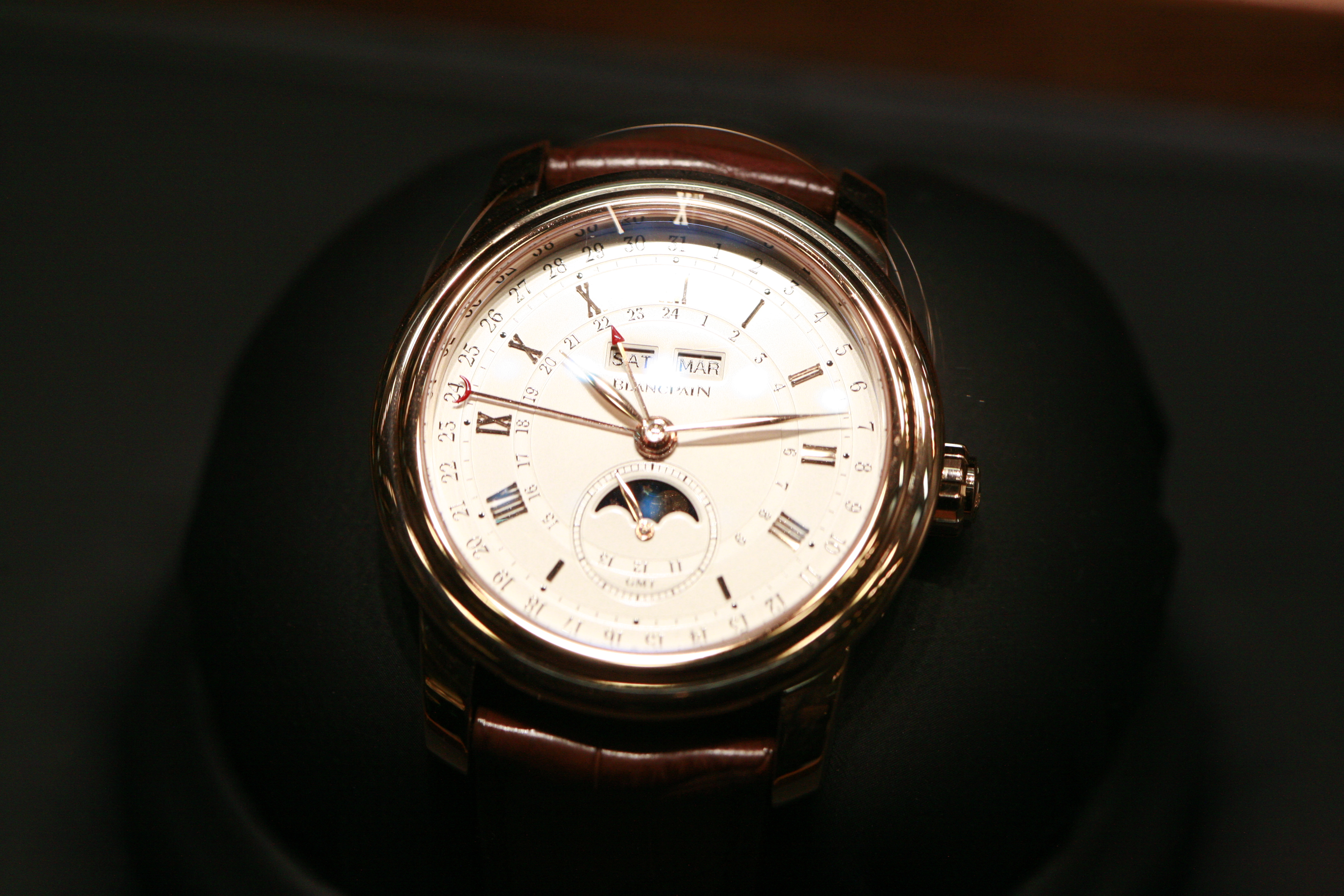
A Villeret wristwatch

The Villeret collection is marketed as Blancpain's most classic collection. Named after the birthplace of Blancpain, the Villeret collection has been a flagship line of the company since 1980s. The collection not only includes wristwatches with simple and elegant designs, but also include watches with complications such as triple calendar, moon phase, and carousel.

=== Fifty Fathoms ===
Blancpain is known for its Fifty-Fathoms watch, produced in collaboration with the French Navy's Nageurs de Combat (combat swimmers) led by Captain Bob Maloubier and Lieutenant Claude Riffaud, and worn by Jacques Cousteau. From 1958, Fifty-Fathoms was standard issue of the US Navy's combat divers and United States Navy SEALs. The watch has a water-resistant level up to 91 meters.

=== 1735 Grande Complication ===
Blancpain is famous for being the creator of one of the most complicated mechanical watches ever made, the Blancpain 1735, which is a true grand complication (Tourbillon, minute repeater, perpetual calendar, split chrono), a limited edition of only 30 pieces.

=== Léman (discontinued) ===
In 1994 Blancpain introduced a series of 38mm (40mm in some later references) wristwatches, capable of water resistance up to 100 meters, while still possessing features typical of a dress watch such as a stepped case, and a relatively slim profile. Earlier references included only calibre 1150 and only presented a date complication. Later references were sometimes equipped with other functions such as ref. 2763 which used calibre 6763 and featured triple calendar, and moonphase complications.

Following a long period of decline in popularity, in 2019 the Leman series was removed from blancpain's catalogue and website.

== Notable patrons and owners ==
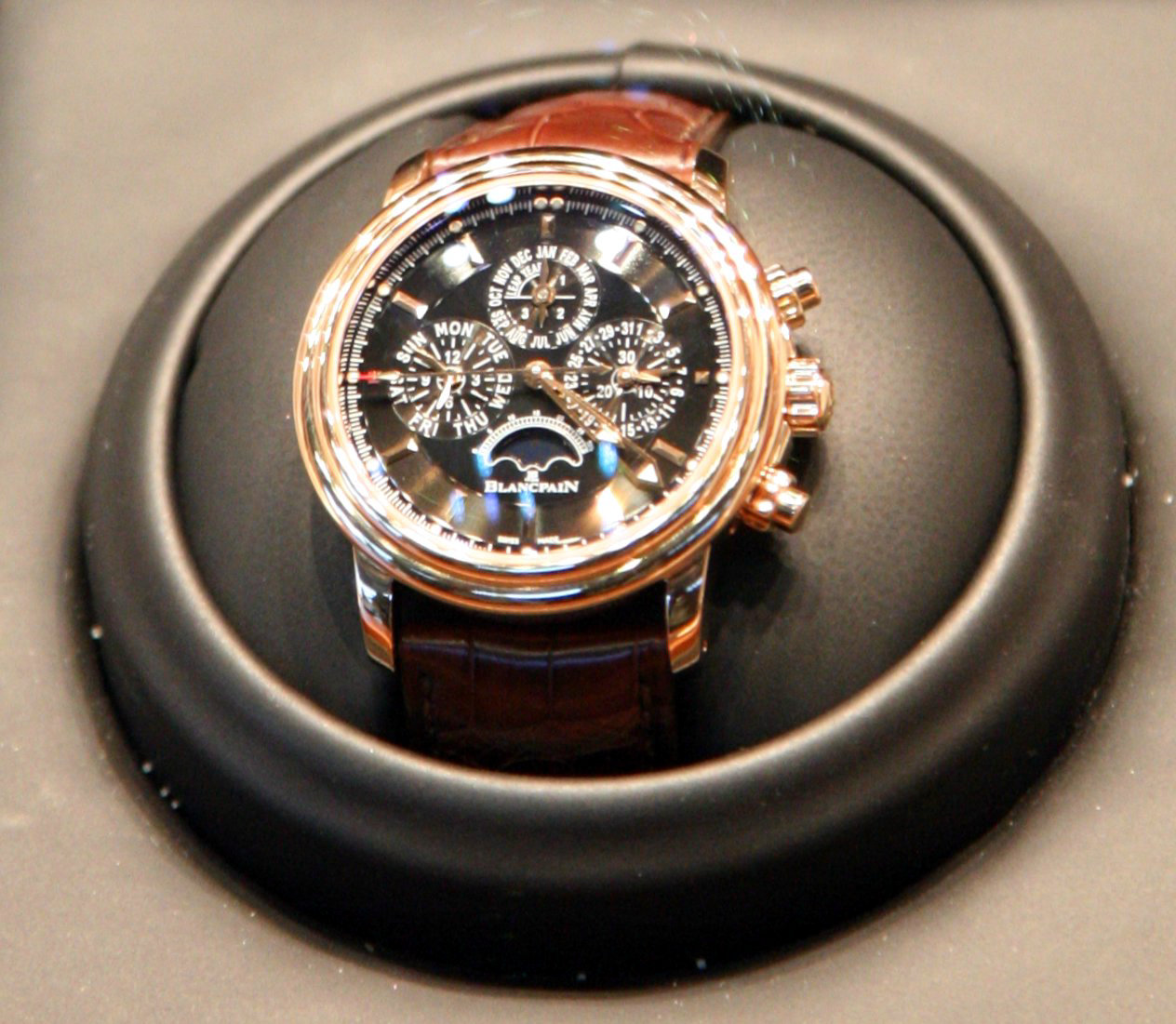
A Blancpain complication wristwatch

=== Artists ===
- Francis Ford Coppola, American film director (The Godfather series) & multiple Academy Awards winner

=== Celebrities ===
- Vladimir Kramnik, Russian chess grandmaster
- Marilyn Monroe, American actress
- Brad Pitt, American actor

=== Politicians ===
- Vladimir Putin, President of Russia

== Sponsorship ==
Blancpain sponsors Motorsport programs including the Blancpain Endurance Series, Blancpain Sprint Series, Blancpain GT Series until 2019 when the sponsorship was discontinued, Lamborghini Blancpain Super Trofeo series, ADAC GT Masters and Reiter Engineering's GT1 and GT3 cars until Reiter mostly stopped racing Lamborghinis.

== Blancpain-Imaginist Literary Prize ==
The Blancpain-Imaginist Literary Prize is a literary prize established by Blancpain and The Imaginist literary journal in 2018 to "discover and encourage outstanding young writers under the age of 45." The winner receives a cash award of 300,000 RMB and the finalists receive 20,000 RMB. Starting from the second session, Blancpain also gave the winner a V series watch.

== See also ==
- List of watch manufacturers
- Manufacture d'horlogerie
