= Card money =

Fiat money printed on cardboard or playing cards

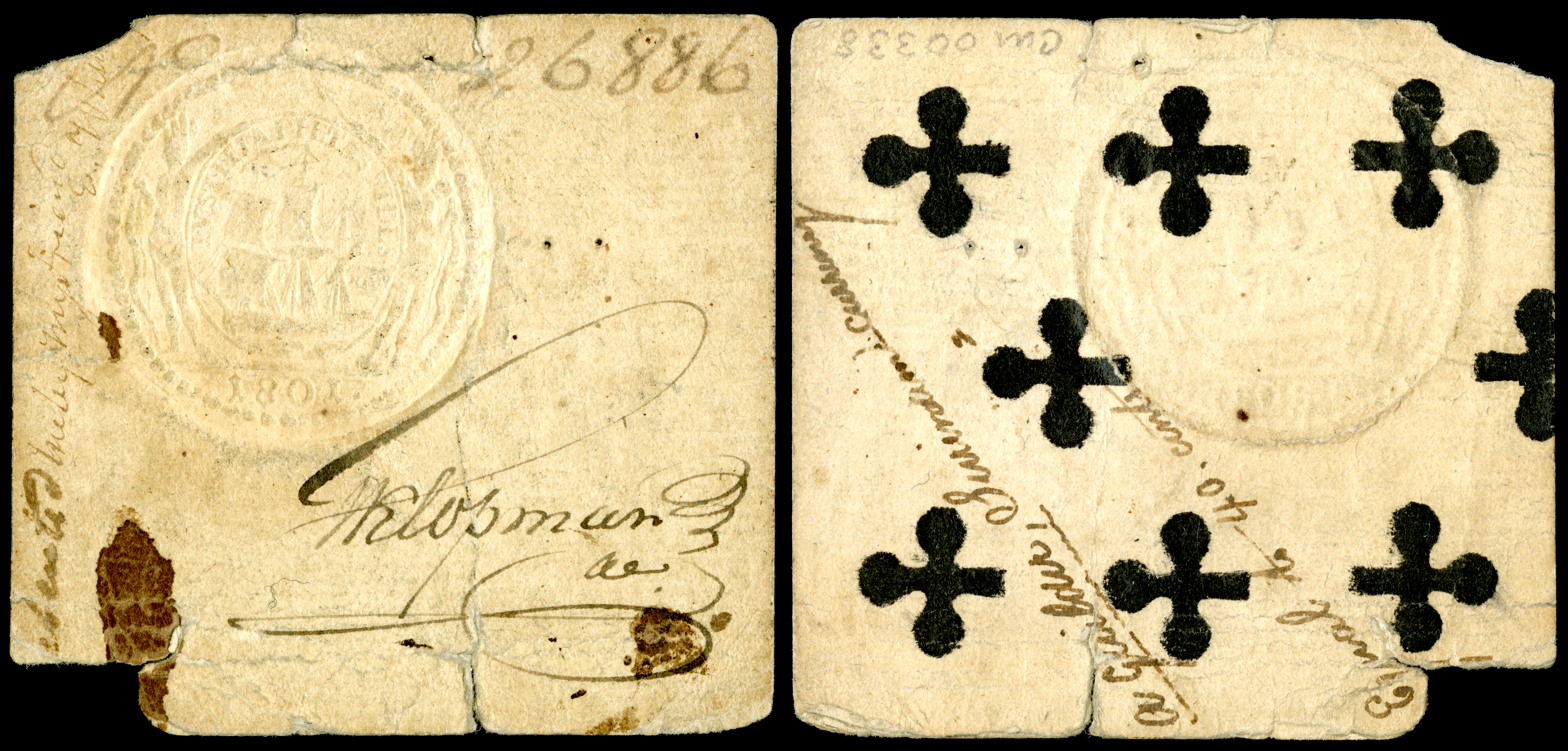
Card money worth one guilder, from Dutch Guiana (1801)

Card money is a type of fiat money printed on plain cardboard or playing cards, which was used at times as currency in several colonies and countries (including Dutch Guiana, New France, and France) from the 17th century to the early 19th century. Where introduced, it was often followed by high rates of inflation.

== Design and use ==
In order to prepare playing cards or plain cardboard for use as currency, the medium had to be given a denomination, a seal, a serial number, and appropriate signatures. In New France, this meant an embossed fleur-de-lis and the signatures of the intendant, governor, and treasurer. In Dutch Guiana, meanwhile, the form these validations took varied between issue.

Card money was generally issued, at least initially, in emergency situations. It could be backed by other currencies, such as Bills of Exchange, or be without guarantee.

== Applications ==
=== New France ===
==== Canada ====
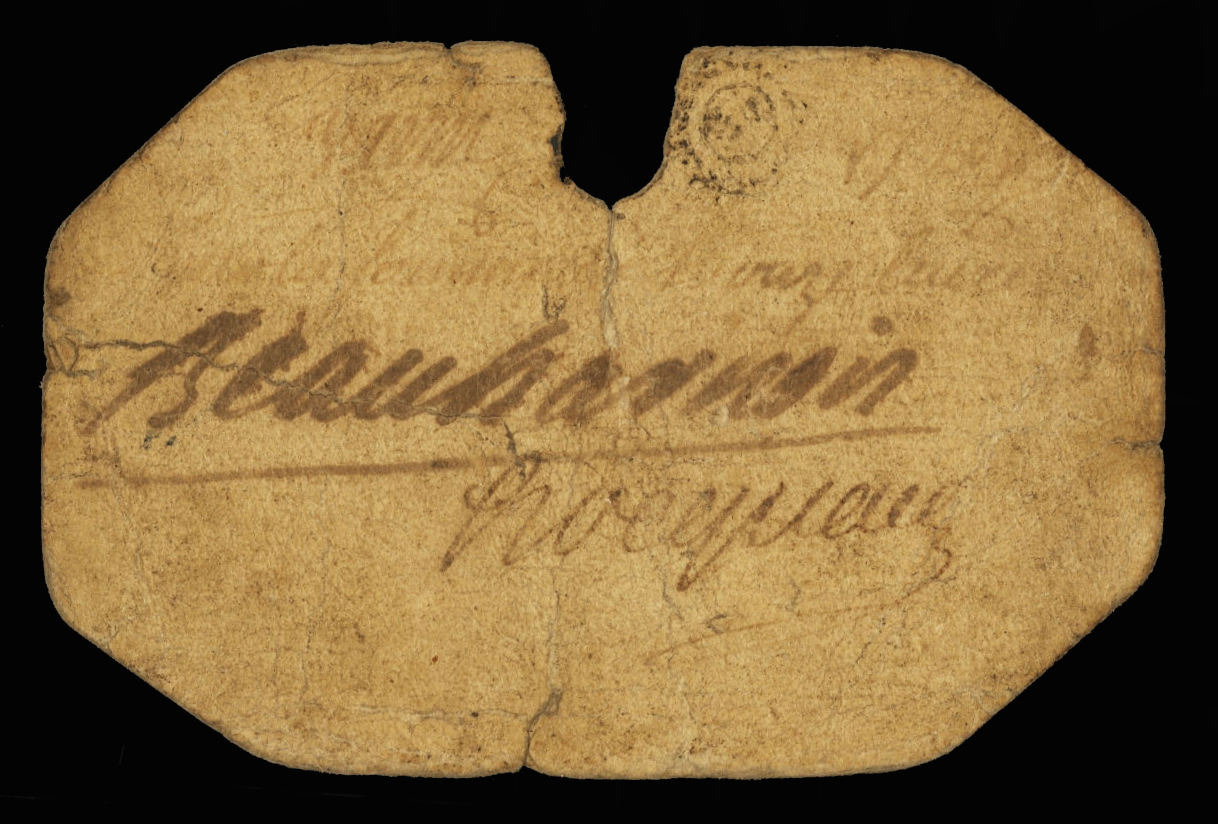
A twelve-livre card from Canada, New France, c. 1735

During the expansion of the French colony in New France (in what is now Canada) in the 17th century, currency had to be imported from France. When the colony faced insolvency owing to great expenses fighting the Iroquois and a diminishing beaver trade, intendant Jacques de Meulles introduced card money to pay soldiers; this soon spread into general use, including commerce. The introduction of card money allowed the colony to reduce deliveries of specie, which could be lost at sea to weather or attack; no specie could be produced locally owing to a lack of precious metals. The currency caught on, and values equal to 100 livres are recorded. Eventually, an estimated two million livres in card money is thought to have circulated.

By the end of the decade New France faced counterfeiting problems with this currency, although counterfeiters could be caned, branded, banished, flogged, or even hanged. It was ultimately inflation, however, which led to the decline of card money in French Canada: the money was produced in a greater quantity than required, in part to offset a failing French economy, while coins were hoarded. Attempts to decrease the value of the cards by half failed, and in 1717 the card money was withdrawn. By 1720 it had been declared worthless.

The recall of card money led to more than a decade of stagnancy, as there was no circulating currency. For this reason, in 1730 the government reinstated card money, reaching a total value of 600,000 livres by 1733. Unlike the earlier issues of card money, however, these were printed on plain cards, rather than playing cards. In 1763, after another burst of inflation brought on by a turbulent war-time economy, card money was ultimately and permanently withdrawn from the settlement.

==== French Louisiana ====
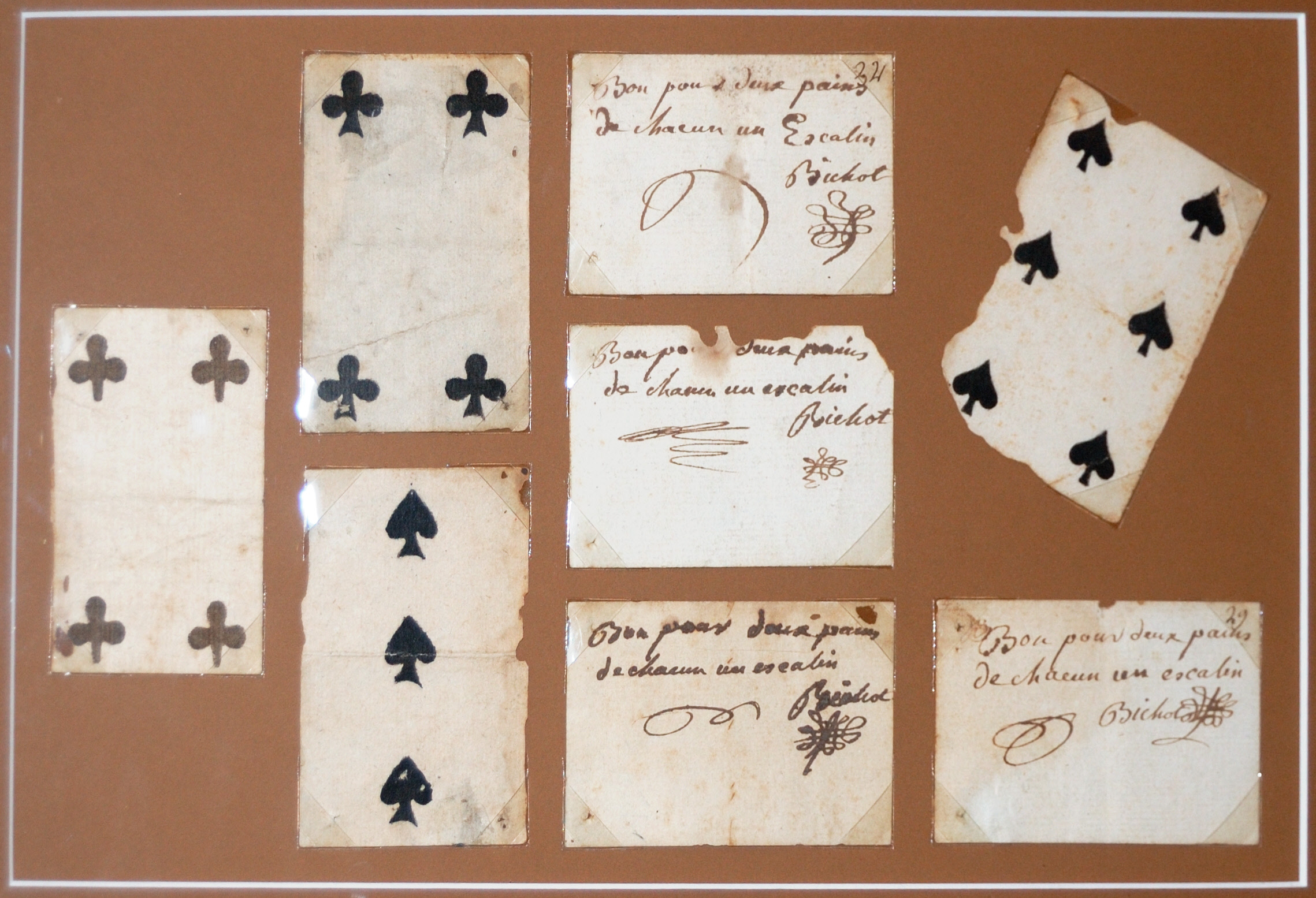
Card money (French Louisiana colony)

Between 1716 and 1720, John Law and his privately held (French government backed) Banque Royale issued paper currency in colonial French Louisiana far in excess of the reserve set aside to back these issues. When investors attempted to redeem notes for specie, the bank stopped payment. The "Mississippi Bubble" began to burst in May 1720, when Banque Royale notes were depreciated by 50% followed by a financial crisis in France. For nearly 18 months there was no official circulating currency. The Company of the Indies ran storehouses for employees. The purchase of goods required vouchers which circulated as a makeshift currency. The company began issuing card money in January 1722 with two authorizing signatures of company directors in France or local officers in Louisiana. Denominations ranged from 5 sous to 50 livres, in different shapes to be easily distinguished by non-French speaking and illiterate population. With the introduction of the company card money also came severe inflation. By 1725 both the company vouchers and cards had been redeemed.

In the early 1730s, again faced with a shortage of specie and letters of exchange, the Count of Maurepas recommended applying a card money system, similar to the one then in use in Canada, in French Louisiana. This was intended for domestic trade, without any mark-up, and to be backed through letters of exchange. On 14 September 1735, the French Crown approved an issue of card money up to 200,000 livres, with a quota of 150,000 livres for letters of exchange. Cards were prepared and signed by the Crown's comptroller in Louisiana, with higher denominations requiring the countersignatures of the governor and ordonnateur. For the next two years the value of the card money remained stable, sustained by ordonnateur Edmé Gatien Salmon's issuance of letters of exchange in excess of the quota. By 1739, however, value of the card money had decreased, as attempts to redeem the cards for letters of exchange went unfilled. The colony was incurring great expenses during their war with the Chickasaw, and – with the French government unwilling to increase the quota for letters of exchange – by 1741 Salmon was already drawing on his quota for 1744. This shortage, and resulting inflation, meant that by 1743 the card money was essentially worthless. In 1745, with war still ongoing, the card money and other paper issued by the colony was burned; before liquidization, notes were exchanged for letters of exchange at two fifths of face value.

A 1758 request by ordonnateur Vincent de Rochemore, that card money again be issued, went ignored. Some of the Louisiana card money remained extant into the 1760s. However, none of the several thousand government notes issued are known to have survived until the present. There are likewise no known surviving examples of Company of the Indies issues.

==== Illinois Country ====
By the 1740s the administrators of Fort de Chartres, in the Illinois Country, were using card money to pay their troops; the numismatist Harry Wigington suggests that the currency was introduced by administrators who had experience with similar notes in Canada or New Orleans. Known as Solde de Troupe notes, this card money did not have official government backing. Rather, it was authorized by the fort's commanders and applied by the guardians of its warehouse. These notes were discontinued when the British – who, by law, had to pay their soldiers in specie – assumed control of the fort in 1763. However, owing to continued French cultural and social influence, circulation and issuance of these notes continued into the mid-1760s.

=== Dutch Guiana ===
Card money was first used in Dutch Guiana, now Suriname, in 1761. Issues could be on plain cards or playing cards, and were at first cut into circles approximately 38 millimetres (1.5 in) in diameter, resembling coins. Later card money was rectangular, in order to save on labor, although some issues continued to be round or even hexagonal. Initial issues were in the value of 1, 2.5, and 10 guilders, later followed by issues of 0.5, 5, and 100 guilders. The cards, which had no intrinsic value, were initially backed by bills of exchange from the Netherlands but later released unsecured.

The card currency produced in Guiana soon outpaced demand, such that inflation became an issue, and although the cards ostensibly traded at 3 card guilders to 2.50 guilders from the Netherlands, the value began fluctuating greatly. However, the colony's residents continued to use card money, and when Guiana was controlled by the British in the early 19th century, they also produced this money, fearing a deficit. The Dutch regained control of Guiana in 1816, and the card money continued. In 1826, the Dutch colonial government formally introduced paper currency, similar to Dutch banknotes but with the word Suriname overprinted on the bills. The colony's card money was not formally abolished until two years later.

In his 1997 book Surinam Paper Currency, Theo van Elmpt records a total of 94 issues of card money in the country, and the Central Bank of Suriname estimates that the total face value of the cards issued was between five and ten million guilders. However, few specimens survive. In the oral tradition of the Suriname Maroons, the term Wan Bigi Karta ("a big card") continued to refer to the sum of 3.20 guilders as late as 1900.

=== France ===
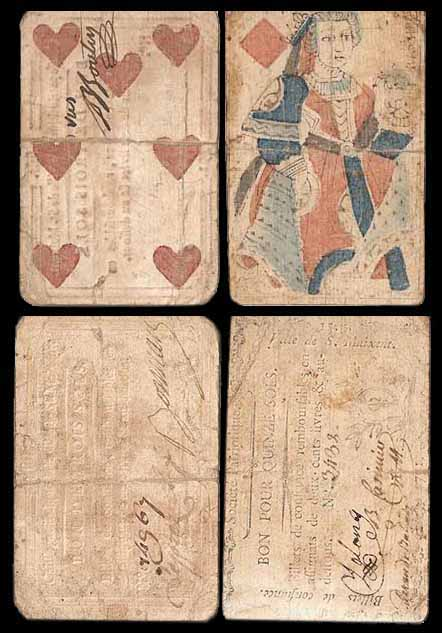
Two billets de confiance from Saint-Maixent. The seven of hearts (left) has a face value of 3 sols, whereas the queen of diamonds has a value of 15 sols.

During the French Revolution, billets de confiance ("bills of trust") were issued on card money and similar paper by employers or similar authorities. An estimated 5500 different billets were issued from approximately 1500 communes between 1790 and 1793. They were generally printed on cards or coloured paper, and signed by the bearer or issuing authority. This money was generally oriented horizontally, and decorations could include revolutionary symbolism (such as a liberty cap or fasces), patriotic slogans, the name of commune where a billet was issued, or an ornate border.

These billets de confiance bore no guarantee, but could be exchanged for assignats, a type of paper currency introduced by the revolutionary government of which there was a shortage. However, issuing authorities were not required to keep enough assignats on hand to redeem all the card money they issued; the Paris-based Maison de Secours ran up a deficit of 2 million livres by issuing more billets de confiance than they held in assignats. The billets faced heavy counterfeiting, which resulted in the issuing authorities making more complex designs. In February 1792 tax collectors stopped accepting payments in billets de confiance; economist Florin Aftalion suggests that this may have been due to concerns over counterfeiting. Ultimately, in mid-1793 the issuing of card money was stopped.

== Evaluation ==
Veronique Deblon, writing for the National Bank of Belgium, notes that all issues of card money "could not be called unqualified success[es]", as they were capable of solving budget deficits but eventually were overproduced, leading to inflation. The numismatist Neil Shafer concurs, noting that the card money of Guiana "served its purpose" in spite of the devaluation. In his article on the card money in French Canada, Larry Allen described it as "show[ing] the flexibility, adaptability, and inventiveness of an expanding economic system", despite "seem[ing] ... far-fetched".

== Works cited ==
- Allen, Larry (2009). Encyclopedia of Money (2nd ed.). Santa Barbara: ABC-CLIO. ISBN 978-1-59884-252-4.
- Aftalion, Florin (1990). The French Revolution, an Economic Interpretation. Cambridge: Cambridge University Press. ISBN 978-0-521-36241-2.
- Bank of Canada (1966). The Story of Canada's Currency (2nd ed.). Ottawa: Bank of Canada. OCLC 231875966.
- Clark, John Garretson (1970). New Orleans, 1718–1812: An Economic History. Baton Rouge: Louisiana State University Press. ISBN 978-0-8071-0346-3.
- Cuhaj, George S., ed. (2012). Standard Catalog of World Paper Money General Issues – 1368–1960. Vol. 2. Krause. ISBN 978-1-4402-3195-7.
- Deblon, Veronique (October 2012). "Money Games". National Bank of Belgium Museum. Archived from the original on 11 September 2014.
- Gayarre, Charles (1854). History of Louisiana – The French Dominion. New York: Redfield.
- Lester, Richard A. (1964). "Playing-Card Currency of French Canada". In Edward P. Neufeld (ed.). Money and Banking in Canada. Montreal: McGill-Queen's University Press. pp. 9–23. ISBN 9780773560536. OCLC 732600576.
- McLachlan, R. W. (1911). The Canadian Card Money. Montreal: [s.n.] OCLC 0665751753.
- Miller Surrey, Nancy M. (1916). The Commerce of Louisiana During the French Regime, 1699 – 1763. Columbia University (Dissertation). ISBN 9780722266137.
- Newman, Eric P. (2008). The Early Paper Money of America. Krause Publications. ISBN 978-0-89689-326-9.
- Pritchard, James (2004). In Search of Empire: The French in the Americas, 1670–1730. Cambridge: Cambridge University Press. ISBN 978-0-521-82742-3.
- Shafer, Neil (3 January 2012). "Surinam a Collecting Challenge". Bank Note Reporter. Archived from the original on 11 September 2014.
- Taws, Richard (2013). The Politics of the Provisional: Art and Ephemera in Revolutionary France. University Park, Pennsylvania: Pennsylvania State University Press. ISBN 978-0-271-05418-6.
- Tori, Mori. "Wan Bigi Karta" [A Big Card]. Central Bank of Suriname. Archived from the original on 23 September 2015.
- Wigington, Harry G. (January–February 1984). "The Illinois Country Currency". Paper Money. XXIII (1). Society of Paper Money Collectors: 3–11. ISSN 0031-1162. (subscription required)
