= Grégory Fichten =

French rugby union player

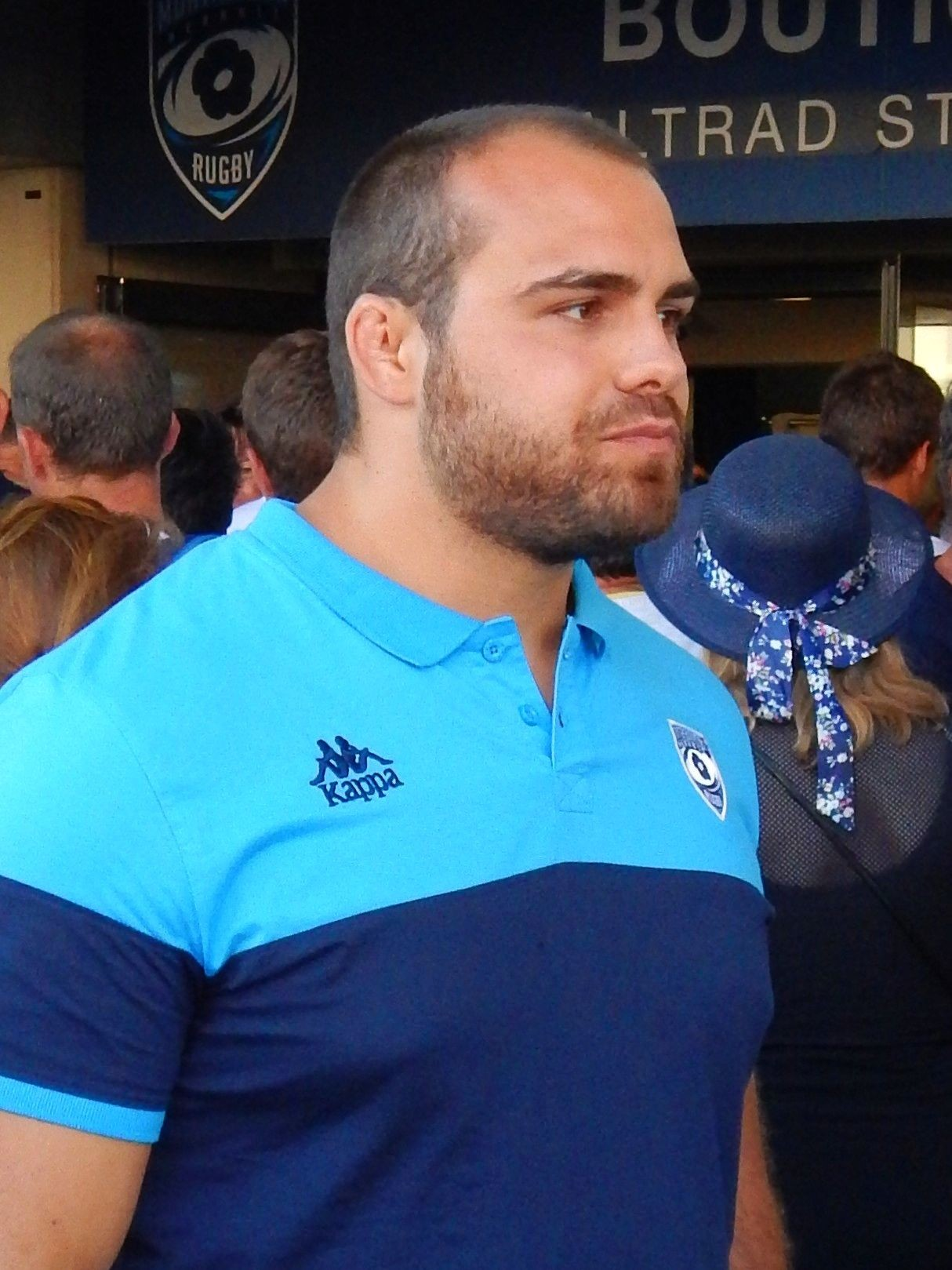
- Born: 13 August 1990 (age 36) France
- Height: 1.83 m (6 ft 0 in)
- Weight: 120 kg (18 st 13 lb; 265 lb)

Rugby union career
- Position: Prop
Senior career
Years	Team	Apps	(Points)
2010-2016	RC Narbonne	85	(15)
2016–	Montpellier	48	(0)
- Correct as of 10 December 2016

Grégory Fichten (born 13 August 1990) is a French rugby union player. His position is Prop and he currently plays for Montpellier in the Top 14. He began his career with RC Narbonne in the Pro D2 before moving to Montpellier in 2016.
