= 1916 in Japan =

- Decades: 1890s; 1900s; 1910s; 1920s; 1930s
- See also: Other events of 1916; History of Japan • Timeline • Years

Events in the year 1916 in Japan. It corresponds to Taishō 5 (大正5年) in the Japanese calendar.

== Incumbents ==
- Emperor: Emperor Taishō
- Prime minister:
  - Ōkuma Shigenobu: until October 9
  - Terauchi Masatake: from October 9

=== Governors ===
- Aichi Prefecture: Matsui Shigeru
- Akita Prefecture: Saburo Sakamoto (until 28 April); Genzaburo Kojima (starting 28 April)
- Aomori Prefecture: Matsujiro Obama
- Ehime Prefecture: Renarto Fukamachi (until 28 April); Sakata Kanta (starting 28 April)
- Fukui Prefecture: Sato Kozaburo
- Fukushima Prefecture: Sukeji Horiguchi (until 28 April); Takukichi Kawasaki (starting 28 April)
- Gifu Prefecture: Shimada Gotaro
- Gunma Prefecture: Miyake Gennosuke
- Hiroshima Prefecture: Terada Yushi (until 28 April); Eitaro Mabuchi (starting 28 April)
- Hyogo Prefecture: Seino Chotarno (starting month unknown)
- Ibaraki Prefecture: Keisuke Sakanaka
- Ishikawa Prefecture: Ōta Masahiro (until month unknown)
- Iwate Prefecture: Rinpei Otsu
- Kagawa Prefecture: Raizo Wakabayashi
- Kochi Prefecture: Toki Kahei (until 13 October); Takeo Kakinuma (starting 13 October)
- Kumamoto Prefecture: Kawakami Shinhare (until 13 October); Ōta Masahiro (starting 13 October)
- Kyoto Prefecture: Shoichi Omori (until April); Jūshirō Kiuchi (starting April)
- Mie Prefecture:
  - until 28 April: Eitaro Mabuchi
  - 28 April – 23 October: Shujiro Nagata
  - starting 23 October: Miki Nagano
- Miyagi Prefecture: Tsunenosuke Hamada
- Miyazaki Prefecture: Shutaro Horiuchi
- Nagano Prefecture: Tenta Akaboshi
- Niigata Prefecture: Keisuke Sakanaka (until 2 June); Tsuizui Katagawa (starting 2 June)
- Okinawa Prefecture:
  - until 28 April: Kyūgorō Ōmi
  - 28 April – 4 May: Iwatarō Otagiri
  - starting 4 May: Kuniyoshi Suzuki
- Osaka Prefecture: Marques Okubo Toshi Takeshi
- Saga Prefecture: Ishibashi Kazu
- Saitama Prefecture: Akiratani Akira (until 13 October); Tadahiko Okada (starting 13 October)
- Shiname Prefecture: Ichiro Oriharami
- Tochigi Prefecture: Shin Kitagawa (until 2 June); Hiroyoshi Hiratsuka (starting 2 June)
- Tokyo: Yuichi Ionue
- Toyama Prefecture: Ki Masesaku
- Yamagata Prefecture: Iwataro Odakiri (until 28 April); Soeda Keiichiro (starting 28 April)

== Events ==
- Japan during World War I
- January 22 – Japan launches its first domestically manufactured blimp. The blimp left Tokorozawa at 1:30 p.m. and, after landing and refueling at Toyohashi, landed in Osaka at 5:10 p.m. the next day.
- November 2 – Prince Hirohito is formally proclaimed Crown Prince and heir apparent.
- October 9 – Tokyo Confectionery, as predecessor of Meiji Holdings was founded.
- Unknown date
  - A truck brand, Isuzu founded, as predecessor name of Ishikawajima Automobile Manufacturing.
  - Seinan Gakuin University was founded, as predecessor name was Seinan Gakuin in Fukuoka.

== Births ==
- January 9 – Masaharu Taguchi, freestyle swimmer (d. 1982)
- January 12 – Haruo Oka, ryūkōka singer (d. 1970)
- February 14 – Masaki Kobayashi, film director (d. 1996)
- July 1 – Olivia de Havilland, British-American film actress (d. 2020 in France)
- August 8 – Shigeo Arai, freestyle swimmer (d. 1944)
- August 25 – Saburō Sakai, naval aviator and flying ace (d. 2000)
- September 17 – Kuniko Miyake, film actress (d. 1992)
- October 10 – Sumiko Mizukubo, film actress
- October 15 – Yasuji Miyazaki, Olympic swimmer (d. 1989)

== Deaths ==
- January 11 – Takashima Tomonosuke, general (b. 1844)
- February 9 – Katō Hiroyuki, academic and politician (b. 1836)
- August 8 – Kamimura Hikonojō, admiral (b. 1849)
- December 9 – Natsume Sōseki, novelist and poet (b. 1867)
- December 10 – Ōyama Iwao, field marshal (b. 1842)

== See also ==
- List of Japanese films of the 1910s
- Asian and Pacific theater of World War I
