= 1918 in Japan =

- Decades: 1890s; 1900s; 1910s; 1920s; 1930s
- See also: Other events of 1918; History of Japan; Timeline; Years

Events in the year 1918 in Japan. It corresponds to Taishō 7 (大正7年) in the Japanese calendar.

== Incumbents ==
- Emperor: Taishō
- Prime Minister:
  - Terauchi Masatake (until September 29)
  - Hara Takashi (from September 29)

=== Governors ===
- Aichi Prefecture: Matsui Shigeru
- Akita Prefecture: Hijoki Kawaguchi
- Aomori Prefecture: Takeji Kawamura (until 3 October); Ushimaro Sawada (starting 3 October)
- Ehime Prefecture: Raizo Wakabayashi
- Fukui Prefecture: Kawashima Miki
- Fukushima Prefecture: Takukichi Kawasaki
- Gifu Prefecture: Kanokogi Kogoro
- Gunma Prefecture: Tomojiro Nakagawa
- Hiroshima Prefecture: Eitaro Mabuchi (until 7 May); Yasukouchi Asakichi (starting 7 May)
- Hyogo Prefecture: Seino Chotarno (until month unknown)
- Ibaraki Prefecture: Yuichiro Chikaraishi
- Iwate Prefecture: Rinpei Otsu
- Kagawa Prefecture: Sakata Kanta
- Kanagawa Prefecture: Chūichi Ariyoshi
- Kochi Prefecture: Takeo Kakinuma
- Kumamoto Prefecture: Ota Masahiro
- Kyoto Prefecture: Jūshirō Kiuchi (until May); Eitaro Mabuchi (starting May)
- Mie Prefecture: Miki Nagano
- Miyagi Prefecture: Tsunenosuke Hamada
- Miyazaki Prefecture: Shutaro Horiuchi
- Nagano Prefecture: Tenta Akaboshi
- Niigata Prefecture: Watanabe Katsusaburo
- Okayama Prefecture: Masao Kishimoto
- Okinawa Prefecture: Kuniyoshi Suzuki
- Saga Prefecture: Muneyoshi Oshiba
- Saitama Prefecture: Tadahiko Okada
- Shiname Prefecture: Yasukichi Nishimura
- Tochigi Prefecture: Hiroyoshi Hiratsuka
- Tokyo: Yuichi Ionue
- Toyama Prefecture: Takashi Inoue
- Yamagata Prefecture: Ichiro Yoda

== Events ==
- January 9 – According to Japanese government official confirmed report, a worst powder snow avalanche hit into residential area in Mitsumata village, (present day of Yuzawa), Niigata Prefecture, 158 person were human fatalities.
- January 20 – According to Japanese government official confirmed report, a secondary massibie powder snow avalanche hit in residence area in Asahi village, (present day of Tsuruoka), Yamagata Prefecture, total 154 persons were human fatalities.
- July – September – Rice riots: a series of popular disturbances erupt throughout Japan over the precipitous rise in the price of rice causing extreme economic hardship, particularly in rural areas where rice was the main staple of life.
- September 29 – Hara Takashi becomes Prime Minister, the first commoner to be appointed to the office.
- November 11 – World War I ends: Germany signs an armistice agreement with the Allies in a railroad car outside Compiègne in France.
- November 22 – Nippon-United States (Nichibei) Sheet Glass, as predecessor of Nippon Sheet Glass was founded in Osaka.
- date unknown – Start of the French military mission to Japan (1918-1919)
- Founded
  - Citizen Watch (シチズン時計), as predecessor name was Shōkōsha Watch Institute Research.
  - Glory (グローリー), as predecessor name was Kokuei Machine Manufacturing.
  - Hochiki (ホーチキ), as predecessor name was Tokyo Hochiki.
  - Panasonic (パナソニック), as predecessor name was Matsushita Electronics Work Manufacturing.
  - Tokyu Land (東急不動産), as predecessor name was Denen Toshi Developer.
  - Resona Holdings, as predecessor name was Osaka Nomura Bank (大阪野村銀行).
  - Sundai Preparatory School (駿台予備校), as predecessor name was Tokyo Higher Examination School.

== Births ==
- January 18 – Mutsuhiro Watanabe, soldier and war criminal (d. 2003)
- January 31 – Michiyo Kogure, film actress (d. 1990)
- February 4 – Yuzo Kawashima, film director (d. 1963)
- February 13 – Junichi Sasai, aviator (d. 1942)
- April 1 – Utako Okamoto, medical doctor (d. 2016)
- May 4 – Kakuei Tanaka, 64th Prime Minister of Japan (d. 1993)
- May 27 – Yasuhiro Nakasone, 45th Prime Minister of Japan (d. 2019)
- July 2 – Fumiko Hori, painter (d. 2019)
- September 17 – Marii Hasegawa, peace activist (d. 2012)
- October 4 – Kenichi Fukui, chemist, Nobel laureate in chemistry (d. 1998)
- October 8 – Sanae Takasugi, actress (d. 1995)
- December 15 – Chihiro Iwasaki, artist and illustrator (d 1974)

== Deaths ==
- February 4 – Akiyama Saneyuki, soldier (b. 1868)
- February 10 – Hachisuka Mochiaki, politician, former daimyō (b. 1846)
- September 17 – Motono Ichirō politician and diplomat (b. 1862)
- September 30 – Ōura Kanetake, politician (born 1850)
- date unknown – Arakaki Seishō, Okinawan martial arts master (born 1840)

== See also ==
- List of Japanese films of the 1910s
- Asian and Pacific theatre of World War I
- Japan during World War I
- Japanese intervention in Siberia
