= 1915 in Japan =

- Decades: 1890s; 1900s; 1910s; 1920s; 1930s
- See also: Other events of 1915; History of Japan • Timeline • Years

Events in the year 1915 in Japan. It corresponds to Taishō 4 (大正4年) in the Japanese calendar.

== Incumbents ==
- Emperor: Taishō
- Prime Minister: Ōkuma Shigenobu

=== Governors ===
- Aichi Prefecture: Matsui Shigeru
- Akita Prefecture: Saburo Sakamoto
- Aomori Prefecture: Matsujiro Obama
- Ehime Prefecture: Renarto Fukamachi
- Fukui Prefecture: Sato Kozaburo
- Fukushima Prefecture: Ota Masahiro (until 1 April); Sukeji Horiguchi (starting 1 April)
- Gifu Prefecture: Shimada Gotaro
- Gunma Prefecture: Miyake Gennosuke
- Hiroshima Prefecture: Terada Yushi
- Hyogo Prefecture: Seino Chotarno (starting month unknown)
- Ibaraki Prefecture: Keisuke Sakanaka
- Ishikawa Prefecture: Kiichirō Kumagai then Ōta Masahiro
- Iwate Prefecture: Rinpei Otsu
- Kagawa Prefecture: Takeji Kawamura (until 9 January); Raizo Wakabayashi (starting 9 January)
- Kanagawa Prefecture: Chūichi Ariyoshi (starting month unknown)
- Kochi Prefecture: Toki Kahei
- Kumamoto Prefecture: Kawakami Shinhare
- Kyoto Prefecture: Shoichi Omori
- Mie Prefecture: Eitaro Mabuchi
- Miyagi Prefecture: Magoichi Tahara (until 12 August); Tsunenosuke Hamada (starting 12 August)
- Miyazaki Prefecture: Tadakazu Ariyoshi (until 12 August); Shutaro Horiuchi (starting 12 August)
- Nagano Prefecture: Yuichiro Chikaraishi (until 12 August); Tenta Akaboshi (starting 12 August)
- Niigata Prefecture: Keisuke Sakanaka
- Okinawa Prefecture: Kyūgorō Ōmi
- Osaka Prefecture: Marques Okubo Toshi Takeshi
- Saga Prefecture: Raizo Wakabayashi (until 8 January); Ishibashi Kazu (starting 8 January)
- Saitama Prefecture: Akira Sakaya
- Shiname Prefecture: Ichiro Oriharami
- Tochigi Prefecture: Shin Kitagawa
- Tokyo: Kubota Kiyochika (until 2 July); Yuichi Ionue (until 2 July)
- Toyama Prefecture: Tsunenosuke Hamada (until 12 August); Ki Masesaku (starting 12 August)
- Yamagata Prefecture: Iwataro Odakiri

== Events ==
- January 18 – Twenty-One Demands from Japan to China are made.
- March unknown date – A tool brand, Makita founded, as predecessor name was Makita Electronics Manufacturing.
- March 25 – 1915 Japanese general election: The Rikken Dōshikai party emerged as the largest party in the House of Representatives, winning 153 of the 381 seats. The 381 members of the House of Representatives were elected in 51 multi-member constituencies based on prefectures and cities. Voting was restricted to men aged over 25 who paid at least 10 yen a year in direct taxation.
- May 18 – Toshiko, Princess Yasu, ninth daughter of Emperor Meiji, marries Prince Naruhiko Higashikuni
- September 1 – Yokogawa Electric was founded.
- November 10 – Enthronement of Taishō as the Emperor of Japan in the Imperial Palace in Kyoto. Originally scheduled to be held in 1914 (Taisho 3, 大正3年), it was postponed for one year in April of the same year due to the death of Empress Shōken.
- November Unknown date – Azuma Kogyo, as predecessor of Teijin, founded in Yonezawa, Yamagata Prefecture.
- December 9–14 – Sankebetsu brown bear incident: was the worst bear attack in Japanese history, killing seven settlers in Rokusensawa, Sankebetsu, Tomamae, Rumoi, Hokkaidō, Japan.
- Ōura scandal
- Tapani incident
- Ongoing – Japan during World War I

== Births ==
- January 4 – Michiko Kuwano, actress (d. 1946)
- January 20 – Masanori Yusa, freestyle swimmer (d. 1975)
- February 15 – Haruo Umezaki, writer (d. 1965)
- February 20 – Takiko Mizunoe, actress, film producer, and radio and television presenter (d. 2009)
- February 28 – Nobuo Kojima, writer and author (d. 2006)
- May 12 – Tadashi Sasaki, electrical engineer (d. 2018)
- May 15 – Shozo Makino, swimmer (d. 1987)
- June 22 – Hatsuko Morioka, freestyle swimmer (d. unknown)
- October 17 – Taiji Tonoyama, actor (d. 1989)
- November 20 – Kon Ichikawa, film director (d. 2008)
- December 2 – Takahito, Prince Mikasa, youngest son of Emperor Taishō (d. 2016)
- December 25 – Yumeko Aizome, actress (d. unknown)

== Deaths ==
- January 12 – Arisaka Nariakira, Lieutenant general and inventor of the Arisaka rifle (b. 1852)
- August 5 – Sakuma Samata, politician and Governor of Taiwan (b. 1844)
- September 1 – Inoue Kaoru, politician (Genrō) (b. 1836)
- September 4 – Goseda Yoshimatsu, artist (b. 1855)
- September 26 – Tsuruko Haraguchi, psychologist and the first Japanese woman to receive a Doctor of Philosophy (b. 1886)
- September 28 – Saitō Hajime, samurai of the late Edo period, captain of the third unit of the Shinsengumi (b. 1844)
- November 28 – Kobayashi Kiyochika, ukiyo-e artist (b. 1847)

== See also ==
- List of Japanese films of the 1910s
- Asian and Pacific theatre of World War I
