= 1914 in Japan =

- Decades: 1890s; 1900s; 1910s; 1920s; 1930s
- See also: Other events of 1914; History of Japan; Timeline; Years

Events in the year 1914 in Japan. It corresponds to Taishō 3 (大正3年) in the Japanese calendar.

== Incumbents ==
- Emperor: Taishō
- Prime Minister:
  - Yamamoto Gonnohyōe
  - Ōkuma Shigenobu

=== Governors ===
- Aichi Prefecture: Matsui Shigeru
- Akita Prefecture: Toyosuke Haneda (until 28 May); Saburo Sakamoto (starting 28 May)
- Aomori Prefecture: Takeo Tanaka (until 28 April); Matsujiro Obama (starting 28 April)
- Ehime Prefecture: Renarto Fukamachi
- Fukui Prefecture: Teru Kagawa (until 9 June); Sato Kozaburo (starting 9 June)
- Fukushima Prefecture: Ota Masahiro
- Gifu Prefecture: Shimada Gotaro
- Gunma Prefecture: Muneyoshi Oshiba (until 28 April); Miyake Gennosuke (starting 28 April)
- Hiroshima Prefecture: Terada Yushi
- Hyogo Prefecture: Seino Chotarno
- Ibaraki Prefecture: Keisuke Sakanaka
- Ishikawa Prefecture: Kiichirō Kumagai (until month unknown)
- Iwate Prefecture: Sadajiro Tsutsumi (until 9 January); Rinpei Otsu (starting 9 January)
- Kagawa Prefecture: Kogoro Kanokogi (until 9 June); Takeji Kawamura (starting 9 June)
- Kochi Prefecture: Kinjiro Nagai (until 9 June); Toki Kahei (starting 9 June)
- Kumamoto Prefecture: Akahoshi Futoshi (until 28 April); Kawakami Shinhare (starting 28 April)
- Kyoto Prefecture: Shoichi Omori
- Mie Prefecture: Magoichi Tahara (until 28 April); Eitaro Mabuchi (starting 28 April)
- Miyagi Prefecture: Mori Masataka (until 28 April); Magoichi Tahara (starting 28 April)
- Miyazaki Prefecture: Tadakazu Ariyoshi
- Nagano Prefecture: Ichiro Yoda (until 28 April); Yuichiro Chikaraishi (starting 28 April)
- Niigata Prefecture: Ando Kensuke (until 28 April); Keisuke Sakanaka (starting 28 April)
- Okinawa Prefecture: Takuya Takahashi (until 9 June); Kyūgorō Ōmi (starting 9 June)
- Osaka Prefecture: Marques Okubo Toshi Takeshi
- Saga Prefecture: Fuwa (until 9 June); Raizo Wakabayashi (starting 9 June)
- Saitama Prefecture: Soeda Keiichiro (until 9 June); Akira Sakaya (starting 9 June)
- Shiname Prefecture: Takaoka Naokichi (until 28 April); Ichiro Oriharami (starting 28 April);
- Tochigi Prefecture: Okada Bunji (until 5 June); Shin Kitagawa (starting 5 June)
- Tokyo: Munakata Tadash (until 21 April); Kubota Kiyochika (starting 21 April)
- Toyama Prefecture: Tsunenosuke Hamada
- Yamagata Prefecture: Iwataro Odakiri

== Events ==
- January – Siemens scandal breaks out.
- February 10–14 large-scale demonstrations erupted in Tokyo in response to the Siemens scandal.
- March 24 – Both houses of the Imperial Diet refused to pass the 1914 Navy budget
- April 16 – Yamamoto Gonnohyōe resigns as Prime Minister
- August 7 – The United Kingdom (Japan's ally since 1902) officially asked Japan for assistance in destroying the raiders from the Imperial German Navy in and around Chinese waters.
- August 23 – Japan declares war on Germany.
- August 25 – Japan declares war on Austria-Hungary, after Vienna refused to withdraw the Austro-Hungarian cruiser SMS Kaiserin Elisabeth from Qingdao.
- September 2 – Japanese forces landed on China's Shandong province and surrounded the German settlement at Qingdao
- September 6 – A seaplane launched by the seaplane-carrier Wakamiya. unsuccessfully attacked the Austro-Hungarian cruiser Kaiserin Elisabeth and the German gunboat Jaguar with bombs
- October – The Imperial Japanese Navy seized several of Germany's island colonies in the Pacific – the Mariana, Caroline, and Marshall Islands – with virtually no resistance. The Japanese Navy conducted the world's first naval-launched air raids against German-held land targets in Shandong province and ships in Qiaozhou Bay from Wakamiya.
- October 17–November 7 – Naval operations around Qingdao, China.
- October 31–November 7 – Siege of Tsingtao (Qingdao) concluded with the surrender of German colonial forces.
- December 20 – Tokyo Station opened with four platforms; two serving electric trains and two serving non-electric trains.

== Births ==
- January 12 – Mieko Kamiya, psychiatrist (d. 1979)
- April 16 – Hiro Saga, noblewoman (d. 1987)
- May 20 – Hideko Maehata, breaststroke swimmer and first Japanese woman to win an Olympic gold medal. (d. 1995)
- May 30 – Akinoumi Setsuo, sumo wrestler (d. 1979)
- June 12 – Go Seigen, Go player (d. 2014)
- July 30 – Michizō Tachihara, poet and architect (d. 1939)
- August 2 – Sueo Ōe, athlete (d. 1941)
- August 19 – Fumio Hayasaka, composer (d. 1955)
- August 25 – Shizuko Kasagi, singer (d. 1985)
- September 1 – Tsuneko Sasamoto, photojournalist (d. 2022)
- October 1 – Hamao Umezawa, microbiologist (d. 1986)
- October 25 – Yukie Arata, freestyle swimmer (d. unknown)
- November 3 – Saburo Okita, foreign minister (d. 1993)

== Deaths ==
- January 16 – Itō Sukeyuki, admiral (b. 1843)
- February 16 – Aoki Shūzō politician and diplomat (b. 1844)
- April 9 – Empress Shōken, consort of Emperor Meiji (b. 1849)
- November 16 – Shunrō Oshikawa, author and journalist (b. 1876)

== See also ==
- List of Japanese films of the 1910s
- Japan during World War I
- Asian and Pacific theater of World War I
