= 1917 in Japan =

- Decades: 1890s; 1900s; 1910s; 1920s; 1930s
- See also: Other events of 1917: History of Japan; Timeline; Years

Events from the year 1917 in Japan. It corresponds to Taishō 6 (大正6年) in the Japanese calendar.

== Incumbents ==
- Emperor: Taishō
- Prime Minister: Terauchi Masatake

=== Governors ===
- Aichi Prefecture: Matsui Shigeru
- Akita Prefecture: Genzaburo Kojima (until 29 January); Hijoki Kawaguchi (starting 29 January)
- Aomori Prefecture: Matsujiro Obama (until 17 January); Takeji Kawamura (starting 17 January)
- Ehime Prefecture: Sakata Kanta (until 29 January); Raizo Wakabayashi (starting 29 January)
- Fukui Prefecture: Sato Kozaburo (until 29 January); Kawashima Miki (starting 29 January)
- Fukushima Prefecture: Takukichi Kawasaki
- Gifu Prefecture: Shimada Gotaro (until 17 January); Kanokogi Kogoro (starting 17 January)
- Gunma Prefecture: Miyake Gennosuke (until 26 September); Tomojiro Nakagawa (starting 26 September)
- Hiroshima Prefecture: Eitaro Mabuchi
- Hyogo Prefecture: Seino Chotarno
- Ibaraki Prefecture: Keisuke Sakanaka (until 17 January); Yuichiro Chikaraishi (starting 17 January)
- Iwate Prefecture: Rinpei Otsu
- Kagawa Prefecture: Raizo Wakabayashi (until 29 January); Sakata Kanta (starting 29 January)
- Kochi Prefecture: Takeo Kakinuma
- Kumamoto Prefecture: Ōta Masahiro
- Kyoto Prefecture: Jūshirō Kiuchi
- Mie Prefecture: Miki Nagano
- Miyagi Prefecture: Tsunenosuke Hamada
- Miyazaki Prefecture: Shutaro Horiuchi
- Nagano Prefecture: Tenta Akaboshi
- Niigata Prefecture: Tsuizui Katagawa (until 17 December); Watanabe Katsusaburo (starting 17 December)
- Okinawa Prefecture: Kuniyoshi Suzuki
- Osaka Prefecture: Marques Okubo Toshi Takeshi (until month unknown)
- Saga Prefecture:
  - until 17 January: Ishibashi Kazu
  - 17 January-17 December: Okada
  - starting 17 December: Muneyoshi Oshiba
- Saitama Prefecture: Tadahiko Okada
- Shiname Prefecture: Ichiro Oriharami (until 29 January); Yasukichi Nishimura (starting 29 January)
- Tochigi Prefecture: Hiroyoshi Hiratsuka
- Tokyo: Yuichi Ionue
- Toyama Prefecture: Ki Masesaku (until 29 January); Takashi Inoue (starting 29 January)
- Yamagata Prefecture: Soeda Keiichiro (until 17 December); Ichiro Yoda (starting 17 December)

== Events ==
- Japan during World War I
- April 20 – 1917 Japanese general election
- May 8–12 – 1917 Far Eastern Games held in Tokyo.
- October 1 – According to Japanese government official document figure, a large-scale typhoon and tidal wave hit around Tokyo Bay area, 1,362 persons were human fatalities.
- November 2 – Lansing–Ishii Agreement

== Births ==
- January 1 – Shuntaro Hida, physician (d. 2017)
- February 5 – Isuzu Yamada, actress (d. 2012)
- March 5 – Mutsuo Toi, spree killer (d. 1938)
- April 28 – Minoru Chiaki, actor (d. 1999)
- May 6 – Prince Morihiro Higashikuni, husband of Princess Teru (d. 1969)
- May 10 – Shigeo Sugiura, freestyle swimmer (d. 1988)
- August 4 – Jun Tatara, actor (d. 2006)
- August 15 – Yukio Tsuda, footballer (d. 1979)
- August 25 – Tosio Kato, mathematician (d. 1999)
- September 7 – Tetsuo Hamuro, breaststroke swimmer (d. 2005)
- September 11 – Yukiko Todoroki, actress (d. 1967)
- October 19 – Kusuo Kitamura, Olympic swimmer (d. 1996)
- November 25 – Noboru Terada, free style swimmer (d. 1986)

== Deaths ==
- July 19 – Kyōsuke Eto, army officer (b. 1881)
- August 19 – Kikuchi Dairoku, mathematician and educator, (b. 1855)
- August 21 – Yoshito Okuda, Mayor of Tokyo (b. 1860)
- October 24 – Katayama Tōkuma, architect (b. 1854)
- December 23 – Aoyama Tanemichi, medical scientist and doctor (b. 1859)

== See also ==
- List of Japanese films of the 1910s
- Asian and Pacific theatre of World War I
