= 2000 in Japan =

- Decades: 1980s; 1990s; 2000s; 2010s; 2020s
- See also: Other events of 2000; History of Japan • Timeline • Years

The following lists events that happened during 2000 in Japan. It corresponds to the year Heisei 12 in the Japanese calendar.

== Incumbents ==
- Emperor: Akihito
- Prime Minister: Keizo Obuchi (L–Gunma) until April 5, Yoshiro Mori (L–Ishikawa)
- Chief Cabinet Secretary: Mikio Aoki (Councillor, L–Shimane) until July 4, Hidenao Nakagawa (L–Hiroshima) until October 27, Yasuo Fukuda (L–Gunma)
- Chief Justice of the Supreme Court: Shigeru Yamaguchi
- President of the House of Representatives: Sōichirō Itō (L–Miyagi) until June 2, Tamisuke Watanuki (L–Toyama) from July 4
- President of the House of Councillors: Jūrō Saitō (L–Mie) until October 19, Yutaka Inoue (L–Chiba)
- Diet sessions: 147th (regular, January 20 to June 2), 148th (special, July 4 to July 6), 149th (extraordinary, July 28 to August 9), 150th (extraordinary, September 21 to December 1)

=== Governors ===
- Aichi Prefecture: Masaaki Kanda
- Akita Prefecture: Sukeshiro Terata
- Aomori Prefecture: Morio Kimura
- Chiba Prefecture: Takeshi Numata
- Ehime Prefecture: Moriyuki Kato
- Fukui Prefecture: Yukio Kurita
- Fukuoka Prefecture: Wataru Asō
- Fukushima Prefecture: Eisaku Satō
- Gifu Prefecture: Taku Kajiwara
- Gunma Prefecture: Hiroyuki Kodera
- Hiroshima Prefecture: Yūzan Fujita
- Hokkaido: Tatsuya Hori
- Hyogo Prefecture: Toshitami Kaihara
- Ibaraki Prefecture: Masaru Hashimoto
- Ishikawa Prefecture: Masanori Tanimoto
- Iwate Prefecture: Hiroya Masuda
- Kagawa Prefecture: Takeki Manabe
- Kagoshima Prefecture: Tatsurō Suga
- Kanagawa Prefecture: Hiroshi Okazaki
- Kochi Prefecture: Daijiro Hashimoto
- Kumamoto Prefecture: Joji Fukushima (until 25 February); Yoshiko Shiotani (starting 16 April)
- Kyoto Prefecture: Teiichi Aramaki
- Mie Prefecture: Masayasu Kitagawa
- Miyagi Prefecture: Shirō Asano
- Miyazaki Prefecture: Suketaka Matsukata
- Nagano Prefecture: Gorō Yoshimura (until 26 October); Yasuo Tanaka (starting 26 October)
- Nagasaki Prefecture: Genjirō Kaneko
- Nara Prefecture: Yoshiya Kakimoto
- Niigata Prefecture: Ikuo Hirayama
- Oita Prefecture: Morihiko Hiramatsu
- Okayama Prefecture: Masahiro Ishii
- Okinawa Prefecture: Keiichi Inamine
- Osaka Prefecture: Yoshiki Kimura (until 8 February); Fusae Ōta (starting 8 February)
- Saga Prefecture: Isamu Imoto
- Saitama Prefecture: Yoshihiko Tsuchiya
- Shiga Prefecture: Yoshitsugu Kunimatsu
- Shiname Prefecture: Nobuyoshi Sumita
- Shizuoka Prefecture: Yoshinobu Ishikawa
- Tochigi Prefecture: Fumio Watanabe (until 8 December); Akio Fukuda (starting 9 December)
- Tokushima Prefecture: Toshio Endo
- Tokyo: Shintarō Ishihara
- Tottori Prefecture: Yoshihiro Katayama
- Toyama Prefecture: Yutaka Nakaoki
- Wakayama Prefecture: Isamu Nishiguchi (until 2 September); Yoshiki Kimura (starting 3 September)
- Yamagata Prefecture: Kazuo Takahashi
- Yamaguchi Prefecture: Sekinari Nii
- Yamanashi Prefecture: Ken Amano

== Events ==
=== January ===
- January 26: The Southern All-Stars release "Tsunami", the best-selling CD single in Japanese history.

=== February ===
- February 6: Osaka gubernatorial election – Osaka's first female governor, Fusae Ohta, is elected.

=== March ===
- March 4: Sony Computer Entertainment's PlayStation 2 goes on sale in Japan.
- March 8: Naka-Meguro train disaster
- March 31: Mount Usu in Hokkaido erupts for the first time in 23 years.

=== April ===
- April 1: Ritsumeikan Asia Pacific University opens in Ōita Prefecture.
- April 2: Prime Minister Keizo Obuchi suffers a massive stroke and is hospitalized.
- April 4: Obuchi cabinet resigns.
- April 5: Yoshiro Mori is elected Prime Minister.

=== May ===
- May 14: Obuchi dies.
- May 15: Yoshiro Mori makes his first major gaffe, referring to Japan as a "divine nation centering on the Emperor."

=== June ===
- June to July: According to Japan Health and Welfare Ministry official confirmed report, an outbreak of food poisoning at dairy factory in Osaka, resulting to 13,420 people being infected, however, there were no reports of any deaths. This was confirmed by an Official, who said this incident was caused by enterotoxin in skimmed milk.
- June 25: General election held.

=== July ===
- July 8: Volcanic eruption on Miyakejima.
- July 19: Bank of Japan issues the first 2,000-yen banknotes.
- July 21–23: G8 Summit held in Nago, Okinawa.

=== August ===
- August 1: New 500-yen coins enter circulation.

=== September ===
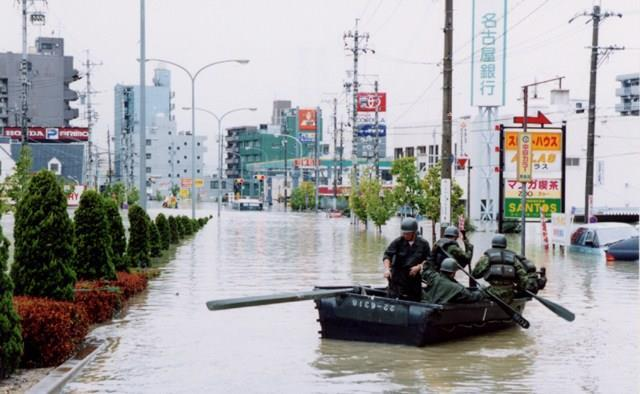
A torrential rain and flash flood in 2000 Nagoya flash flood

- September 2: Miyakejima is evacuated as the eruption continues.
- September 12: Heavy torrential rain and flash flood hits Nagoya and its suburbs, according to The Fire and Disaster Management Agency of Japan report, ten people lost their lives, with 115 people injured.
- September 19: The Mizuho Financial Group is established, becoming Japan's first bank holding company.

=== October ===
- October 1: The DDI Corporation, the KDD Corporation and the ODI Corporation merge to become KDDI.
- October 6: A magnitude 6.6 earthquake hits the city of Yonago, Tottori, injuring 182 people.
- October 27: Chief Cabinet Secretary Hidenao Nakagawa resigns to take responsibility for a sex scandal he was embroiled in; Yasuo Fukuda is appointed in his place.
- November 5: After being exposed by Mainichi Shimbun, archaeologist Shinichi Fujimura confesses to being a fraud; Japanese archaeologists had based their treatises on his findings.

=== November ===
- November 8: Japanese Red Army leader Fusako Shigenobu is arrested in Osaka.

== The Nobel Prize ==
- Hideki Shirakawa: 2000 Nobel Prize in Chemistry winner.

== Births ==
- January 26 – Shunsuke Izumiya, hurdle athleter
- February 19 – Chisaki Morito, pop singer
- February 21 – Yuto Miyazawa, child singer
- February 22 – Munetaka Murakami, professional baseball player (Tokyo Swallows)
- April 4 – Shosei Togo, professional baseball pitcher (Tokyo Giants)
- June 6 – Vaundy, singer-songwriter
- June 7 – Ōnosato Daiki, sumo wrestler
- August 27 – Tatsuomi Hamada, actor and model
- August 29 – Minami Hamabe, actress
- September 25 – Lilas Ikuta, singer (Yoasobi)
- October 30 – Giselle, singer (Aespa)
- November 2 – Junna, pop singer
- December 2 – Ichika Osaki, actress
- December 11 – Rinne Yoshida, idol singer and rapper

== Deaths ==
- January 22 – Masao Harada, athlete (b. 1912)
- February 7 – Shiho Niiyama, voice actress (b. 1970)
- March 7 – Masami Yoshida, javelin thrower (b. 1958)
- April 7 – Masayuki Minami, volleyball player (b. 1941)
- May 10 – Kaneto Shiozawa, voice actor (b. 1954)
- May 13 – Jumbo Tsuruta, wrestler (b. 1951)
- May 14 – Keizo Obuchi, prime minister of Japan (b. 1937)
- June 16 – Empress Kōjun (b. 1903)
- June 19 – Noboru Takeshita, Prime minister of Japan (b. 1924)
- June 22 – Osamu Takizawa, actor (b. 1906)
- July 23 – Ogura Yuki, painter (b. 1895)
- August 12 – Noboru Akiyama, baseball pitcher (b. 1934)
- September 22 – Saburō Sakai, naval aviator and flying ace (b. 1916)
- October 4 – Masaji Iguro, ski jumper (b. 1913)
- October 13 – Masao Fujii, baseball player (b. 1968)
- October 25 – Mochitsura Hashimoto, officer in the Imperial Japanese Navy (b. 1909)
- October 31 – Kazuki Watanabe, musician (b. 1981)
- November 30 – Kiyotaka Katsuta, serial killer (b. 1948)

== See also ==
- 2000 in Japanese television
- List of Japanese films of 2000
