= 1913 in Japan =

- Decades: 1890s; 1900s; 1910s; 1920s; 1930s
- See also: Other events of 1913; History of Japan; Timeline; Years

Events in the year 1913 in Japan. It corresponds to Taishō 2 (大正2年) in the Japanese calendar.

== Incumbents ==
- Emperor: Emperor Taishō
- Prime Minister:
  - Katsura Tarō (until February 20)
  - Yamamoto Gonnohyōe (starting February 20)

=== Governors ===
- Aichi Prefecture: Kenzo Ishihara (until 13 March); Matsui Shigeru (starting 13 March)
- Akita Prefecture: Toyosuke Haneda
- Aomori Prefecture: Takeda Chiyosaburo (until 1 June); Takeo Tanaka (starting 1 June)
- Ehime Prefecture: Renarto Fukamachi
- Fukui Prefecture: Tokiwa Ikematsu (until 1 June); Teru Kagawa (starting 1 June)
- Fukushima Prefecture: Hiromichi Nishikubo (until 1 June); Ota Masahiro (starting 1 June)
- Gifu Prefecture: Sadakichi Usu (until 1 June); Shimada Gotaro (starting 1 June)
- Gunma Prefecture: Yasuyoshi Kurogane (until 1 June); Muneyoshi Oshiba (starting 1 June)
- Hiroshima Prefecture: Nakamura Junkuro (until 27 February); Terada Yushi (starting 27 February)
- Ibaraki Prefecture: Keisuke Sakanaka
- Iwate Prefecture: Shinichi Kasai (until 3 March); Sadajiro Tsutsumi (starting 3 March)
- Kagawa Prefecture: Kogoro Kanokogi
- Kumamoto Prefecture: Ueyama Mitsunoshin (until 31 May); Akahoshi Futoshi (starting 31 May)
- Kochi Prefecture: Goro Sugiyama (until 1 June); Kinjiro Nagai (starting 1 June)
- Kyoto Prefecture: Shoichi Omori
- Mie Prefecture: Magoichi Tahara
- Miyagi Prefecture: Terada Yushi (until 27 February); Mori Masataka (starting 27 February)
- Miyazaki Prefecture: Tadakazu Ariyoshi
- Nagano Prefecture: Teikan Chiba (until 3 April); Ichiro Yoda (starting 3 April)
- Nara Prefecture: Raizo Wakabayashi (until month unknown)
- Niigata Prefecture: Izawa Takio (until 8 September); Ando Kensuke (starting 8 September)
- Okayama Prefecture: Tsunamasa Ōyama (until month unknown)
- Okinawa Prefecture: Hibi Shigeaki (until 1 June); Takuya Takahashi (starting 1 June)
- Osaka Prefecture: Marques Okubo Toshi Takeshi
- Saga Prefecture: Fuwa
- Saitama Prefecture: Shimada Gotaro (until 1 June); Soeda Keiichiro (starting 1 June)
- Shiname Prefecture: Takaoka Naokichi
- Tochigi Prefecture: Okada Bunji
- Tokyo: Munakata Tadash
- Tottori Prefecture: Oka Kishichiro Itami (until month unknown)
- Toyama Prefecture: Tsunenosuke Hamada
- Yamagata Prefecture: Iwataro Odakiri

== Events ==
- January 21 – The first French private school opens in Tokyo. Later graduates include Sakaguchi Ango, Tanizaki Junichiro and Takehisa Yumeji.

== Births ==
- January 12 – Yoshi Katō, actor (d. 1988)
- February 9 – Haruyo Ichikawa, film actress (d. 2004)
- February 11 – Masaji Kiyokawa, backstroke swimmer (d. 1999)
- March 7 – Masako Katsura, billiards player (d. 1995)
- March 28 – Toko Shinoda, painter (d. 2021)
- April 12 – Keiko Fukuda, martial artist (d. 2013)
- May 4 – Hisaya Morishige, actor (d. 2009)
- May 14 – Masaji Iguro, ski jumper (d. 2000)
- June 24 – Takeshi Nagata, earth scientist, (d. 1991)
- July 4 – Princess Ayako Takeda (d. 2003)
- September 4 – Kenzō Tange, architect (d. 2005)
- September 12 – Eiji Toyoda, industrialist (d. 2013)
- October 21 – Princess Sawako Kitashirakawa, daughter of Prince Naruhisa Kitashirakawa (d. 2001)
- October 26 – Sakunosuke Oda, writer (d. 1947)
- November 5 – Seiji Miyaguchi, actor (d. 1985)
- December 15 – Masayoshi Ito, politician (d. 1994)

== Deaths ==
- January 20 – Nakane Kōtei, writer (b. 1839)
- June 23 – Ogino Ginko, first licensed female physician of western medicine in Japan (b. 1851)
- July 5 – Prince Arisugawa Takehito, Marshal Admiral (b. 1862)
- July 10 – Hayashi Tadasu, diplomat and cabinet minister (b. 1850)
- July 30 – Itō Sachio, writer and poet (b. 1864)
- September 2 – Okakura Kakuzō, scholar (b. 1862)
- September 4 – Shōzō Tanaka, social activist (b. 1841)
- October 10 – Katsura Tarō, general and Prime Minister of Japan (b. 1848)
- November 22 – Tokugawa Yoshinobu, 15th and last Tokugawa shogunate (b. 1837)
- Ichikawa Kumehachi, kabuki actress (b. 1846)
