= 1999 in Japan =

- Decades: 1970s; 1980s; 1990s; 2000s; 2010s
- See also: Other events of 1999; History of Japan • Timeline • Years

Events in the year 1999 in Japan. It corresponds to the year Heisei 11 in the Japanese calendar.

== Incumbents ==
- Emperor: Akihito
- Prime Minister: Keizo Obuchi (L–Gunma)
- Chief Cabinet Secretary: Hiromu Nonaka (L–Kyōto) until October 5, Mikio Aoki (Councillor, L–Shimane)
- Chief Justice of the Supreme Court: Shigeru Yamaguchi
- President of the House of Representatives: Sōichirō Itō (L–Miyagi)
- President of the House of Councillors: Jūrō Saitō (L–Mie)
- Diet sessions: 145th (regular, January 19 to August 13), 146th (extraordinary, October 29 to December 15)

=== Governors ===
- Aichi Prefecture: Reiji Suzuki (until 14 February); Masaaki Kanda (starting 15 February)
- Akita Prefecture: Sukeshiro Terata
- Aomori Prefecture: Morio Kimura
- Chiba Prefecture: Takeshi Numata
- Ehime Prefecture: Sadayuki Iga (until 27 January); Moriyuki Kato (starting 28 January)
- Fukui Prefecture: Yukio Kurita
- Fukuoka Prefecture: Wataru Asō
- Fukushima Prefecture: Eisaku Satō
- Gifu Prefecture: Taku Kajiwara
- Gunma Prefecture: Hiroyuki Kodera
- Hiroshima Prefecture: Yūzan Fujita
- Hokkaido: Tatsuya Hori
- Hyogo Prefecture: Toshitami Kaihara
- Ibaraki Prefecture: Masaru Hashimoto
- Ishikawa Prefecture: Masanori Tanimoto
- Iwate Prefecture: Hiroya Masuda
- Kagawa Prefecture: Takeki Manabe
- Kagoshima Prefecture: Tatsurō Suga
- Kanagawa Prefecture: Hiroshi Okazaki
- Kochi Prefecture: Daijiro Hashimoto
- Kumamoto Prefecture: Joji Fukushima
- Kyoto Prefecture: Teiichi Aramaki
- Mie Prefecture: Masayasu Kitagawa
- Miyagi Prefecture: Shirō Asano
- Miyazaki Prefecture: Suketaka Matsukata
- Nagano Prefecture: Gorō Yoshimura
- Nagasaki Prefecture: Genjirō Kaneko
- Nara Prefecture: Yoshiya Kakimoto
- Niigata Prefecture: Ikuo Hirayama
- Oita Prefecture: Morihiko Hiramatsu
- Okayama Prefecture: Masahiro Ishii
- Okinawa Prefecture: Keiichi Inamine
- Osaka Prefecture: Knock Yokoyama (until 27 December); Yoshiki Kimura (starting 27 December)
- Saga Prefecture: Isamu Imoto
- Saitama Prefecture: Yoshihiko Tsuchiya
- Shiga Prefecture: Yoshitsugu Kunimatsu
- Shiname Prefecture: Nobuyoshi Sumita
- Shizuoka Prefecture: Yoshinobu Ishikawa
- Tochigi Prefecture: Fumio Watanabe
- Tokushima Prefecture: Toshio Endo
- Tokyo: Yukio Aoshima (until 22 April); Shintarō Ishihara (starting 22 April)
- Tottori Prefecture: Yuji Nishio (until 12 April); Yoshihiro Katayama (starting 12 April)
- Toyama Prefecture: Yutaka Nakaoki
- Wakayama Prefecture: Isamu Nishiguchi
- Yamagata Prefecture: Kazuo Takahashi
- Yamaguchi Prefecture: Sekinari Nii
- Yamanashi Prefecture: Ken Amano

== Events ==
- January 1: Telephone numbers in Osaka are extended to ten digits, and mobile phone numbers throughout Japan are extended to eleven.
- March 3: The Bank of Japan announces its zero interest rate policy.
- April 11: 1999 Tokyo gubernatorial election – Shintaro Ishihara is elected governor of Tokyo.
- June 29: Heavy rainfall in Hiroshima Prefecture causes hundreds of landslides and kills 24 people.
- July 1: NTT is divided into a holding company, NTT, and three telecom companies, NTT East, NTT West and NTT Communications.
- July 23: ANA Flight 61 survives a hijacking attempt and lands safely.
- July 31: Rock band Glay gathers about the audiences of 200,000 people at a specially installed pay parking lot of Makuhari Messe in Chiba and hold a Japanese historical concert.
- August 9: The Act on National Flag and Anthem is passed.
- September 8: Hiroshi Zota randomly attacks passers-by near Ikebukuro Station with a hammer and kitchen knife, killing two and injuring eight.
- September 25: According to Japan Fire and Disaster Management Agency confirmed report, Typhoon Bart hit tidal wave occurs in Shiranui, Kumamoto Prefecture, tornado occurs in Toyohashi, Aichi Prefecture, total 31 persons killed and 1,218 injured.
- September 29: Yasuaki Uwabe drives a car into Shimonoseki Station and then stabs people, killing five, before being arrested.
- September 30: According to Japanese government official confirmed report, JCO Tokaimura nuclear accident occurs in Ibaraki Prefecture, total two workers fatalities.
- November 10: Diet of Japan holds its first Question Time.
- December 4: Yamagata Shinkansen extension to Shinjō Station opens.

== Births ==
- February 3: Kanna Hashimoto, J-Pop singer (Rev. from DVL) and actress
- February 7: Tamaki Matsumoto, child actress.
- March 12: Sakura Oda, singer.
- April 15: Hisanori Yasuda, professional baseball player
- April 23: Sumire Morohoshi, actress.
- April 24: Saika Kawakita, actress and singer
- May 7: Masaki Sato, J-Pop singer.
- May 9: Nozomi Ōhashi, child actor and singer.
- June 20: Yui Mizuno, singer/dancer (Babymetal).
- June 29: Taisei Ota, professional baseball pitcher
- July 4: Moa Kikuchi, singer/dancer (Babymetal).
- August 8: Sera Azuma, fencer
- August 22: Mun In-ju, North Korean footballer
- September 24: Mei Nagano, actress.
- October 27: Haruka Kudō, singer.
- October 28: Ai Yoshikawa, actress.
- November 13: Kotona Hayashi, volleyball player.
- December 22: Tomori Kusunoki, voice actress

== Deaths ==
- January 31: Shohei Baba, professional wrestler (b. 1938)
- February 21: Hideo Itokawa, rocket scientist (b. 1912)
- March 11: Kaoru Tada, manga artist (b. 1960)
- March 23: Kazue Takahashi, voice actress (b. 1929)
- March 27: Hiroyuki Okita, actor (b. 1963)
- April 9: Emiko Kado, professional wrestler (b. 1976)
- April 13: Masaji Kiyokawa, backstroke swimmer (b. 1913)
- April 19: Shijaku Katsura, rakugo performer (b. 1939)
- April 29: Denzo Ishizaki, supercentenarian (b. 1886 (or 1884?))
- May 6: Kaii Higashiyama, painter (b. 1908)
- June 21: Ukyō Kamimura (Kami), musician (b. 1972)
- June 24: Kōzō Murashita, singer and songwriter (b. 1953)
- July 16: Hiromi Yanagihara, J-pop singer (b. 1979)
- July 21: Jun Etō, literary critic (b. 1932)
- August 2: Meisei Goto, author (b. 1932)
- August 9: Jackie Sato, professional wrestler (b. 1957)
- September 16: Utaemon Ichikawa, actor (b. 1907)
- September 22
  - Noriko Awaya, Soprano chanson and ryūkōka singer (b. 1907)
  - Tomoo Kudaka, football player (b. 1963)
- October 3: Akio Morita, businessman and co-founder of Sony Corporation (b. 1921)
- October 12 – Ayako Miura, novelist (b. 1922)
- October 26: Kazuhito Komatsu, murder victim (b. 1978)
- November 1: Minoru Chiaki, actor (b. 1917)
- November 3
  - Shingo Tachi, racing driver (b. 1977)
  - Keizo Saji, businessman (b. 1919)
- November 9 – Yoshinori Yagi, author (b. 1911)
- November 29
  - Kaoru Iwamoto, go player (b. 1902)
  - Kazuo Sakamaki, naval officer (b. 1918)
- December 4: Daishōhō Masami, sumo wrestler (b. 1967)

== See also ==
- 1999 in Japanese television
- List of Japanese films of 1999
