= 1920 in Japan =

- Decades: 1900s; 1910s; 1920s; 1930s; 1940s
- See also: Other events of 1920; History of Japan • Timeline • Years

Events in the year 1920 in Japan. It corresponds to Taishō 9 (大正9年) in the Japanese calendar.

== Incumbents ==
- Emperor: Taishō
- Prime Minister: Takashi Hara

=== Governors ===
- Aichi Prefecture: Shunji Miyao
- Akita Prefecture: Ryoshin Nao
- Aomori Prefecture: Hidehiko Michioka
- Ehime Prefecture: Toshio Mawatari
- Fukui Prefecture: Kohei Yuji
- Fukuoka Prefecture: Yasukouchi Asakichi
- Fukushima Prefecture: Miyata Mitsuo
- Gifu Prefecture: Kanokogi Kogoro
- Gunma Prefecture: Muneyoshi Oshiba
- Hiroshima Prefecture: Raizo Wakabayashi
- Ibaraki Prefecture: Yuichiro Chikaraishi
- Iwate Prefecture: Takeo Kakinuma
- Kagawa Prefecture: Yoshibumi Satake
- Kochi Prefecture: Abe Yoshihiko
- Kumamoto Prefecture: Hikoji Kawaguchi
- Kyoto Prefecture: Eitaro Mabuchi
- Mie Prefecture: Haruki Yamawaki
- Miyagi Prefecture: Mori Masataka
- Miyazaki Prefecture: Naomiki Hirose
- Nagano Prefecture: Tenta Akaboshi
- Niigata Prefecture: Ota Masahiro
- Okayama Prefecture: Masao Kishimoto
- Okinawa Prefecture: Sōsuke Kawagoe
- Saga Prefecture: Sawada Ushimaro
- Saitama Prefecture: Horiuchi Hidetaro
- Shiname Prefecture: Sanehide Takarabe
- Tochigi Prefecture: Hiroyoshi Hiratsuka
- Tokushima Prefecture: Rinpei Otsu
- Tokyo: Hiroshi Abe
- Toyama Prefecture: Higashizono Motomitsu
- Yamagata Prefecture: Ichiro Yoda
- Yamanashi Prefecture: Miki Nagano

== Events ==
- January 10 – Japan is a founding member of the League of Nations.
- January 30 – Mazda founded, as predecessor name was Toyo Cork Industry.
- February – The Kawanishi Engineering Works, predecessor of ShinMaywa, is founded in Hyogo-ku, Kobe.
- February 1 – Japanese sugar plantation workers in Hawaii officially join a strike led by Filipinos and Hispanic workers.
- February 24 – Nikolayevsk Incident: Realizing that he is outnumbered and far from reinforcement, the commander of the Japanese garrison allows Yakov Triapitsyn's troops to enter the town of Nikolayevsk-on-Amur under a flag of truce.
- May 10 – In the general election, the Rikken Seiyūkai, led by Prime Minister Hara Takashi, increases on its majority of seats in the lower house of the Diet.
- May 31 - The Rome–Tokyo Raid, a cross-Eurasian flight from Rome to Tokyo organized by Harukichi Shimoi and Gabrielle D'Annunzio ends with Arturo Ferrarin arriving in Tokyo.
- June - About 450 Japanese civilians and 350 Japanese soldiers, along with Russian White Army supporters, are massacred by partisan forces associated with the Red Army at Nikolayevsk on the Amur River.
- June Unknown date – Shikishima Bakery was founded in Nagoya, as predecessor of Pasco Shikishima.
- September 1 – Rinnai was founded in Nagoya.
- September 17 – The Victory Medal, a commemorative military medal of Japan awarded to mark service during the First World War, is established by Imperial Edict.
- October 21 – The Battle of Qingshanli begins between the Imperial Japanese Army and Korean armed groups in a densely wooded region of eastern Manchuria called Qīngshānlǐ.
- December 16 – Bank of Yokohama was founded, as predecessor name was Yokohama Kōshō Bank (横浜興商銀行) in Kanagawa Prefecture.
- date unknown
  - The literary magazine Teikoku Bungaku is published for the last time.
  - The Guards Cavalry Regiment, Guards Field Artillery Regiment, Guards Engineer Battalion, Guards Transport Battalion, plus other Guards service units are added to the Japanese Imperial Guard.

== Births ==
- January 23 – Nejiko Suwa, violinist (d. 2012)
- January 30 – Machiko Hasegawa, Illustrator (d. 1992)
- February 12 – Yoshiko Yamaguchi, singer, actress, journalist, and politician (d. 2014)
- March 17 – Takeo Doi, academic, psychoanalyst and author (d. 2009)
- March 22 – Katsuko Saruhashi, geochemist (d. 2007)
- April 1 – Toshiro Mifune, actor (d. 1997)
- May 9 – Mitsuko Mori, actress (d. 2012)
- May 30 – Shōtarō Yasuoka, writer (d. 2013)
- June 17 – Setsuko Hara, actress (d. 2015)
- July 15 – Yoshio Inaba, actor (d. 1998)
- October 20 – Masao Sugiuchi, go player (d. 2017)
- December 24 – Hiroyuki Agawa, writer (d. 2015)

== Deaths ==
- January 10 – Yoshikawa Akimasa, politician and cabinet minister (b. 1842)
- January 11 – Kataoka Shichirō, admiral (b. 1854)
- April 12 – Takaki Kanehiro, naval physician (b. 1849)
- April 27 – Tadashi Satō, soldier and politician (b. 1849)
- September 20 – Shō Ten, last Ryūkyū crown prince, member of the House of Peers (b. 1864)
- October 5 – Suematsu Kenchō, politician and author (b. 1855)
- October 6 – Kuroiwa Shūroku, journalist and writer (b. 1864)
