= 2001 in Japan =

- Decades: 1980s; 1990s; 2000s; 2010s; 2020s
- See also: Other events of 2001; History of Japan • Timeline • Years

The following is a list of events that occurred in the year 2001 in Japan. It corresponds to the year Heisei 13 (平成13年 or 平成十三年) in the Japanese calendar.

== Incumbents ==
- Emperor: Akihito
- Prime Minister: Yoshiro Mori (L–Ishikawa) until April 26, Junichiro Koizumi (L–Kanagawa)
- Chief Cabinet Secretary: Yasuo Fukuda (L–Gunma)
- Chief Justice of the Supreme Court: Shigeru Yamaguchi
- Speaker of the House of Representatives: Tamisuke Watanuki (L–Toyama)
- President of the House of Councillors: Yutaka Inoue (L–Chiba), reelected August 7
- Diet sessions: 151st (regular, January 31 to June 29), 152nd (extraordinary, August 7 to August 10), 153rd (extraordinary, September 27 to December 7)

=== Governors ===
- Aichi Prefecture: Masaaki Kanda
- Akita Prefecture: Sukeshiro Terata
- Aomori Prefecture: Morio Kimura
- Chiba Prefecture: Takeshi Numata (until 4 April); Akiko Dōmoto (starting 4 April)
- Ehime Prefecture: Moriyuki Kato
- Fukui Prefecture: Yukio Kurita
- Fukuoka Prefecture: Wataru Asō
- Fukushima Prefecture: Eisaku Satō
- Gifu Prefecture: Taku Kajiwara
- Gunma Prefecture: Hiroyuki Kodera
- Hiroshima Prefecture: Yūzan Fujita
- Hokkaido: Tatsuya Hori
- Hyogo Prefecture: Toshitami Kaihara (until 31 July); Toshizō Ido (starting 1 August)
- Ibaraki Prefecture: Masaru Hashimoto
- Ishikawa Prefecture: Masanori Tanimoto
- Iwate Prefecture: Hiroya Masuda
- Kagawa Prefecture: Takeki Manabe
- Kagoshima Prefecture: Tatsurō Suga
- Kanagawa Prefecture: Hiroshi Okazaki
- Kochi Prefecture: Daijiro Hashimoto
- Kumamoto Prefecture: Yoshiko Shiotani
- Kyoto Prefecture: Teiichi Aramaki
- Mie Prefecture: Masayasu Kitagawa
- Miyagi Prefecture: Shirō Asano
- Miyazaki Prefecture: Suketaka Matsukata
- Nagano Prefecture: Yasuo Tanaka
- Nagasaki Prefecture: Genjirō Kaneko
- Nara Prefecture: Yoshiya Kakimoto
- Niigata Prefecture: Ikuo Hirayama
- Oita Prefecture: Morihiko Hiramatsu
- Okayama Prefecture: Masahiro Ishii
- Okinawa Prefecture: Keiichi Inamine
- Osaka Prefecture: Fusae Ōta
- Saga Prefecture: Isamu Imoto
- Saitama Prefecture: Yoshihiko Tsuchiya
- Shiga Prefecture: Yoshitsugu Kunimatsu
- Shiname Prefecture: Nobuyoshi Sumita
- Shizuoka Prefecture: Yoshinobu Ishikawa
- Tochigi Prefecture: Akio Fukuda
- Tokushima Prefecture: Toshio Endo
- Tokyo: Shintarō Ishihara
- Tottori Prefecture: Yoshihiro Katayama
- Toyama Prefecture: Yutaka Nakaoki
- Wakayama Prefecture: Yoshiki Kimura
- Yamagata Prefecture: Kazuo Takahashi
- Yamaguchi Prefecture: Sekinari Nii
- Yamanashi Prefecture: Ken Amano

== Events ==
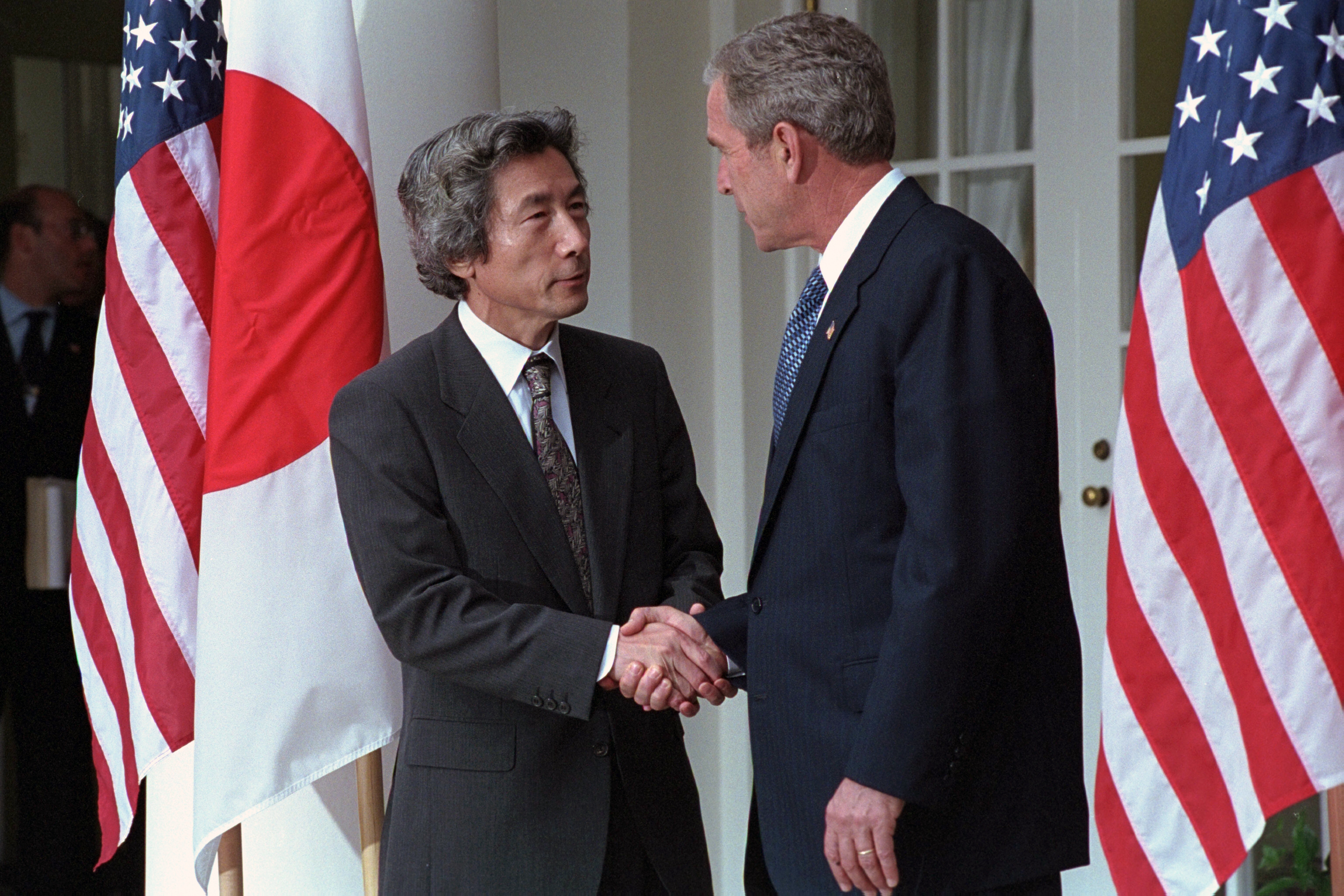
Junichiro Koizumi became prime minister in April.

=== January ===
- January 6: Nurse Daisuke Mori arrested for an attempted murder of 11-year-old girl.
- January 26: A JR yamanote line train coming into Shin-Ōkubo Station hits and kills a man who fell off the platform and two others who jumped onto the rails to rescue him.
- January 31: 2001 Japan Airlines mid-air incident

=== February ===
- February 9: The fishing boat Ehime Maru is struck by a U.S. submarine and sunk.

=== March ===
- March 21: The Nintendo Game Boy Advance handheld is released.
- March 24: 2001 Geiyo earthquake, kill two people with injure 288 in Hiroshima and Ehime.
- March 27: Hikaru Saeki became the first female star officer (admiral and general) in the history of the Japan Self-Defense Forces (JSDF).
- March 31: Universal Studios Japan opens in Osaka.

=== April ===
- April 1: Sakura Bank and Sumitomo Bank merge to form Sumitomo Mitsui Banking Corporation.
- April 6: Japanese government institutes new overtime regulations.
- April 24: Junichiro Koizumi defeats Ryutaro Hashimoto in LDP polls to become prime minister.
- April 26: Koizumi announces his first cabinet, with Makiko Tanaka as foreign minister and Heizo Takenaka as Minister of State for the Economy.

=== June ===
- June 8: Ikeda school massacre takes place.

=== July ===
- July 13: Osaka is removed on the first ballot for the site of the 2008 Summer Olympics.
- July 20: Hayao Miyazaki's Spirited Away premieres; it becomes the first anime film to win an Academy Award.
- July 29: 2001 Japanese House of Councillors election.

=== August ===
- August 13: Koizumi visits Yasukuni Shrine, angering China and South Korea.
- August 16–26: The sixth World Games are held in Akita.
- August 29: The first H-IIA rocket is launched from Tanegashima Space Center.

=== September ===
- September 1: Myojo 56 building fire kills 44.
- September 4: Tokyo DisneySea opens to the public as part of the Tokyo Disney Resort in Urayasu, Chiba, Japan.
- September 11: The first case of Bovine spongiform encephalopathy (BSE) in Japan is discovered.
- September 12: Following the September 11 attacks in the United States, the Nikkei 225 index drops below 10,000 for the first time since 1984.
- September 14: The Nintendo GameCube is released.

=== October ===
- October 1: Ghibli Museum opens.
- October 18: The East Japan Railway Company introduces the Suica smart card service to the Tokyo area.

=== December ===
- December 1: Princess Aiko, potential heiress to the Imperial throne, is born.
- December 9: Television performer Masashi Tashiro is arrested for peeping in a male bath-house.
- December 21: TIME removes Masashi Tashiro from its "Person of the Year" poll after 2channel users vote the "bad boy" performer into first place.

== The Nobel Prize ==
- Ryoji Noyori: 2001 Nobel Prize in Chemistry winner.

== Births ==
- January 2: Wakaba Higuchi, figure skater
- February 2: Maria Makino, pop singer
- February 4: Fūka Haruna, actress
- May 24: Noa Tsurushima, actress
- May 28: Rikako Sasaki, singer
- June 4: Takefusa Kubo, footballer
- June 18: Nako Yabuki, singer
- June 19: Natsumi Sakai, swimmer
- June 25: Yurina Hirate, idol singer
- August 4: Seishiro Kato, actor
- August 31: Nana Mori, actress
- September 8: Mio Tsuneyasu, footballer
- October 1: Pankun, chimpanzee
- October 6: Hitomi Honda, singer
- November 3: Rōki Sasaki, professional baseball pitcher (Chiba Marines)
- December 1: Princess Aiko, the daughter and only child of Crown Prince Naruhito and Crown Princess Masako

== Deaths ==
- March 9: Mitsuo Kagawa, archaeologist (b. 1923)
- April 7: Yasuhira Kiyohara, lieutenant of the Imperial army (b. 1914)
- May 17: Hyōichi Kōno, adventurer (b. 1958)
- July 24: Hiroshi Tsuburaya, actor (b. 1964)
- July 28: Futaro Yamada, author (b. 1922)
- August 25: Ginzō Matsuo, voice actor (b. 1951)
- September 9: Shinji Sōmai, film director (b. 1948)
- September 28: Isao Inokuma, judoka (b. 1938)
- September 30: Takasi Tokioka, zoologist (b. 1913)
- October 11: Fuku Akino, painter (b. 1908)
- November 7: Sachiko Hidari, film actress (b. 1930)
- November 15: Satoru Kobayashi, film director (b. 1930)
- November 30: Kikutaro Baba, malacologist (b. 1905)
- December 20: Kōji Nanbara, actor (b. 1927)
- December 22: Shizue Kato, politician and activist (b. 1897)
- December 29: Takashi Asahina, conductor (b. 1908)

== See also ==
- 2001 in Japanese television
- List of Japanese films of 2001
