= 1919 in Japan =

- Decades: 1890s; 1900s; 1910s; 1920s; 1930s
- See also: Other events of 1919; History of Japan • Timeline • Years

Events in the year 1919 in Japan. It corresponds to Taishō 8 (大正8年) in the Japanese calendar.

== Incumbents ==
- Emperor: Taishō
- Prime Minister: Hara Takashi

=== Governors ===
- Aichi Prefecture: Matsui Shigeru (until 18 April); Shunji Miyao (starting 18 April)
- Akita Prefecture: Hijoki Kawaguchi (until 18 April); Ryoshin Nao (starting 18 April)
- Aomori Prefecture: Ushimaro Sawada (until 18 April); Hidehiko Michioka (starting 18 April)
- Ehime Prefecture: Raizo Wakabayashi (until 18 April); Toshio Mawatari (starting 18 April)
- Fukui Prefecture: Kawashima Miki (until 18 April); Kohei Yuji (starting 18 April)
- Fukuoka Prefecture: Yasukouchi Asakichi (starting month unknown)
- Fukushima Prefecture: Takukichi Kawasaki (until 28 June); Miyata Mitsuo (starting 28 June)
- Gifu Prefecture: Kanokogi Kogoro
- Gunma Prefecture: Tomojiro Nakagawa (until 28 June); Muneyoshi Oshiba (starting 28 June)
- Hiroshima Prefecture: Yasukouchi Asakichi (until 18 April); Raizo Wakabayashi (starting 18 April)
- Ibaraki Prefecture: Yuichiro Chikaraishi
- Iwate Prefecture: Rinpei Otsu (until 18 April); Takeo Kakinuma (starting 18 April)
- Kagawa Prefecture: Sakata Kanta (until 18 April); Yoshibumi Satake (starting 18 April)
- Kanagawa Prefecture: Chūichi Ariyoshi (until month unknown)
- Kochi Prefecture: Takeo Kakinuma (until 18 April); Abe Yoshihiko (starting 18 April)
- Kumamoto Prefecture: Ota Masahiro (until 18 April); Hikoji Kawaguchi (starting 18 April)
- Kyoto Prefecture: Eitaro Mabuchi
- Mie Prefecture: Miki Nagano (until 18 April); Haruki Yamawaki (starting 18 April)
- Miyagi Prefecture: Tsunenosuke Hamada (until 18 April); Mori Masataka (starting 18 April)
- Miyazaki Prefecture: Shutaro Horiuchi (until 12 August); Naomiki Hirose (starting 12 August)
- Nagano Prefecture: Tenta Akaboshi
- Niigata Prefecture: Watanabe Katsusaburo (until 18 April); Ota Masahiro (starting 18 April)
- Okayama Prefecture: Masao Kishimoto
- Okinawa Prefecture: Kuniyoshi Suzuki (until 18 April); Sōsuke Kawagoe (starting 18 April)
- Saga Prefecture: Muneyoshi Oshiba (until 18 April) Sawada Ushimaro (starting 18 April)
- Saitama Prefecture: Tadahiko Okada (until 18 April); Horiuchi Hidetaro (starting 18 April)
- Shiname Prefecture: Yasukichi Nishimura (until 28 June); Sanehide Takarabe (starting 28 June)
- Tochigi Prefecture: Hiroyoshi Hiratsuka
- Tokushima Prefecture: Rinpei Otsu (starting month unknown)
- Tokyo: Yuichi Ionue (until 20 June); Hiroshi Abe (starting 20 June)
- Toyama Prefecture: Takashi Inoue (until 18 April); Higashizono Motomitsu (starting 18 April)
- Yamagata Prefecture: Ichiro Yoda
- Yamanashi Prefecture: Miki Nagano (starting month unknown)

== Events ==
- January 8 – The Maeda Corporation is established.
- January 18 – The Paris Peace Conference opens at the Palace of Versailles, France. Japan sent a large delegation headed by the former Prime Minister, Marquess Saionji Kinmochi. It was originally one of the "big five" but relinquished that role because of its slight interest in European affairs. Instead it focused on two demands: the inclusion of their racial equality proposal in the League's Covenant and Japanese territorial claims with respect to former German colonies, namely Shantung (including Kiaochow) and the Pacific islands north of the Equator (the Marshall Islands, Micronesia, the Mariana Islands, and the Carolines). Makino Nobuaki was technically de facto chief while Saionji's role was symbolic and limited by his ill health.
- February 13 – Japan proposed the inclusion of a "racial equality clause" in the Covenant of the League of Nations as an amendment to Article 21.
- March 1 – March 1st Movement: one of the earliest public displays of Korean resistance during the occupation of the Korean Empire by Japan takes place when 33 activists convene at Taehwagwan Restaurant in Seoul and read the Korean Declaration of Independence. The activists initially planned to assemble at Tapgol Park in downtown Seoul, but chose a more private location out of fear that the gathering might turn into a riot. The leaders of the movement signed the document and sent a copy to the Governor-General of Korea.
- June 28 – Japan signs the Treaty of Versailles, formally ending World War I.
- October 12 – Olympus was founded.
- November 1 – Food Industry Company, as predecessor of Kewpie, founded in Nakano, Tokyo.
- December 1
  - Osaka Transformer Manufacturing, as predecessor of Daihen was founded.
  - Toyo Lenoleum, later Toli was founded in Hyogo Prefecture.
- Unknown date – Konan Junior Highschool, later Konan University founded in Higashinada-ku, Kobe.
- Ongoing – Spanish Flu pandemic

== Births ==
- January 1 – Yoshio Tabata, singer-songwriter and guitarist (d. 2013)
- March 20 – Toshio Ōta, aviator (d. 1942)
- March 23 – Mitsuko Mito, film actress (d. 1981)
- September 23 – Tōta Kaneko, writer (d. 2018)
- October 8 – Kiichi Miyazawa, 78th Prime Minister of Japan (d. 2007)
- date unknown – Akeo Watanabe, orchestral conductor (d. 1990)

== Deaths ==
- January 5 – Sumako Matsui, actress and singer (suicide) (b. 1886)
- January 14 – Asako Hirooka, businesswoman, banker and feminist (b. 1849)
- January 17 – Arichi Shinanojō, admiral (b. 1843)
- February 18 – Ōyama Sutematsu, first Japanese woman to receive a college degree (b. 1860)
- February 19 – Fukushima Yasumasa, general (b. 1852)
- March 7 – Yatarō Mishima, businessman, banker and the 8th Governor of the Bank of Japan, (b. 1867)
- March 25 – Tatsuno Kingo, architect (b. 1854)
- April 23 – Prince Tsunehisa Takeda, major general (b. 1882)
- May 11 – Watanabe Kunitake, politician (Minister of Finance) (b. 1846)
- June 4 – Tokudaiji Sanetsune, politician (Lord Keeper of the Privy Seal of Japan) (b. 1840)
- July 16 – Itagaki Taisuke, politician and leader of the Freedom and People's Rights Movement (b. 1837)
- October 26 – Akashi Motojiro, general, Governor-General of Taiwan, (b. 1864)
- October 29 – Soyen Shaku, Zen Buddhist master (b. 1860)
- November 3 – Terauchi Masatake, military officer, politician and former Prime Minister of Japan (b. 1852)

== See also ==
- List of Japanese films of the 1910s
