= Jūshirō =

- Gender: Male

Origin
- Origin: Japanese
- Meaning: Different meanings depending on the kanji used

Jūshirō, Jushiro or Juushirou (written: 十四郎 or 重四郎) is a masculine Japanese given name. Notable people with the name include:

- Kiuchi Jūshirō (木内 重四郎) (1866–1925), Japanese politician
- Jūshirō Konoe (近衛 十四郎) (1914–1977), Japanese actor

== Fictional characters ==
- Jūshirō Ukitake, a character in the manga series Bleach
