= 1993 in Japan =

- Decades: 1970s; 1980s; 1990s; 2000s; 2010s
- See also: Other events of 1993; History of Japan; Timeline; Years

Events in the year 1993 in Japan. It corresponds to Heisei 5 (平成5年)) in the Japanese calendar.

== Incumbents ==
- Emperor: Akihito
- Prime Minister: Kiichi Miyazawa (L–Hiroshima) until August 9, Hosokawa Morihiro (JNP–Kumamoto)
- Chief Cabinet Secretary: Yōhei Kōno (L–Kanagawa) until August 9, Masayoshi Takemura (NPH–Shiga)
- Chief Justice of the Supreme Court: Ryōhachi Kusaba
- President of the House of Representatives: Yoshio Sakurauchi (L–Shimane) until June 18, Takako Doi (S–Hyōgo) from August 6
- President of the House of Councillors: Bunbē Hara (L–Tokyo)
- Diet sessions: 126th (regular, January 22 to June 18), 127th (special, August 5 to August 28), 128th (extraordinary, September 17 to 1994, January 29)

=== Governors ===
- Aichi Prefecture: Reiji Suzuki
- Akita Prefecture: Kikuji Sasaki
- Aomori Prefecture: Masaya Kitamura
- Chiba Prefecture: Takeshi Numata
- Ehime Prefecture: Sadayuki Iga
- Fukui Prefecture: Yukio Kurita
- Fukuoka Prefecture: Hachiji Okuda
- Fukushima Prefecture: Eisaku Satō
- Gifu Prefecture: Taku Kajiwara
- Gunma Prefecture: Hiroyuki Kodera
- Hiroshima Prefecture: Toranosuke Takeshita (until 28 November); Yūzan Fujita (starting 29 November)
- Hokkaido: Takahiro Yokomichi
- Hyogo Prefecture: Toshitami Kaihara
- Ibaraki Prefecture: Fujio Takeuchi (until 11 August); Masaru Hashimoto (starting 26 September)
- Ishikawa Prefecture: Yōichi Nakanishi
- Iwate Prefecture: Iwao Kudō
- Kagawa Prefecture: Jōichi Hirai
- Kagoshima Prefecture: Yoshiteru Tsuchiya
- Kanagawa Prefecture: Kazuji Nagasu
- Kochi Prefecture: Daijiro Hashimoto
- Kumamoto Prefecture: Joji Fukushima
- Kyoto Prefecture: Teiichi Aramaki
- Mie Prefecture: Ryōzō Tagawa
- Miyagi Prefecture: Shuntarō Honma (until 4 October); Shirō Asano (starting 24 November)
- Miyazaki Prefecture: Suketaka Matsukata
- Nagano Prefecture: Gorō Yoshimura
- Nagasaki Prefecture: Isamu Takada
- Nara Prefecture: Yoshiya Kakimoto
- Niigata Prefecture: Ikuo Hirayama
- Oita Prefecture: Morihiko Hiramatsu
- Okayama Prefecture: Shiro Nagano
- Okinawa Prefecture: Masahide Ōta
- Osaka Prefecture: Kazuo Nakagawa
- Saga Prefecture: Isamu Imoto
- Saitama Prefecture: Yoshihiko Tsuchiya
- Shiga Prefecture: Minoru Inaba
- Shiname Prefecture: Nobuyoshi Sumita
- Shizuoka Prefecture: Shigeyoshi Saitō (until 23 June); Yoshinobu Ishikawa (starting 1 August)
- Tochigi Prefecture: Fumio Watanabe
- Tokushima Prefecture: Shinzo Miki (until 4 October); Toshio Endo (starting 4 October)
- Tokyo: Shun'ichi Suzuki
- Tottori Prefecture: Yuji Nishio
- Toyama Prefecture: Yutaka Nakaoki
- Wakayama Prefecture: Shirō Kariya
- Yamagata Prefecture: Seiichirō Itagaki (until 2 February); Kazuo Takahashi (starting 14 February)
- Yamaguchi Prefecture: Toru Hirai
- Yamanashi Prefecture: Ken Amano

== Events ==
- January 15: A magnitude 7.8 earthquake strikes off the shore of Kushiro, Hokkaido; two people die and 966 are injured.
- January 27: Sumo wrestler Akebono Tarō becomes the first non-Japanese participant to reach the rank of yokozuna.
- April 15: The 10th anniversary of the opening of Tokyo Disneyland.
- May 15: The J-League is established.
- June 9: Crown Prince Naruhito marries Masako Owada.
- June 22: New Party Sakigake breaks away from the Liberal Democratic Party.
- July 7 – July 9: The G7 summit is held in Tokyo.
- July 16: The Yokohama Landmark Tower, Japan's tallest building until the opening of the Abeno Harukas skyscraper, is completed.
- July 18: General elections for the House of Representatives of Japan are held. The Liberal Democratic Party fails to secure a majority.
- August 1 to 6: Torrential rain and a resultant debris flow occur in the Kagoshima area of Kyushu Island. According to the report by the Fire and Disaster Management Agency, 72 people died and 142 were injured.
- August 3: The Kono Statement is issued by the Japanese government.
- August 6: Hosokawa Morihiro is elected as the Prime Minister of Japan. A non-Liberal Democratic Party coalition government composed of seven parties is formed.
- October 5: An accident on the Nankō Port Town Line, an automated people mover in Osaka, injures 215 people at Suminoekōen Station.

== Births ==
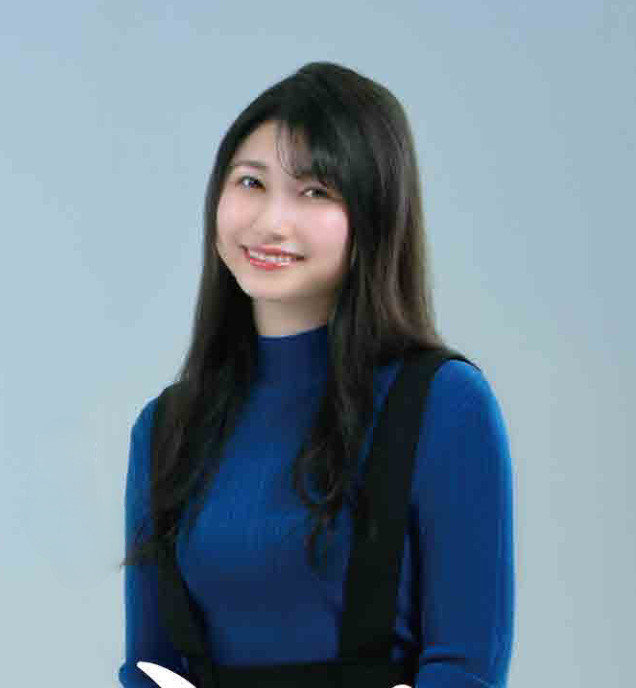
Sora Amamiya

- January 6 – Taku Yashiro, voice actor
- January 12
  - Aika Mitsui, singer
  - Yu Inaba, actor
- January 29 – Kyary Pamyu Pamyu, singer and model
- January 30 – Kodai Senga, professional baseball player
- February 11 – Takumi Ohshiro, professional baseball player
- February 13 – Kasumi Arimura, actress
- February 16 – Sōsuke Genda, professional baseball player
- February 20 – Nanami Hashimoto, idol singer, model, actress
- February 23 – Kasumi Ishikawa, table tennis player
- March 24 – Ryo Ryusei, actor
- April 1 – Keito Okamoto, singer
- April 11 – Yūji Takahashi, footballer
- April 26 – Kaoru Mitsumune, actress and model
- May 3 – Shuto Takajo, professional baseball player
- May 9 – Ryosuke Yamada, actor and singer
- May 10 – Mirai Shida, actress
- May 17 – Ayaka Sayama, gravure idol
- May 19 – Ryunosuke Kamiki, actor
- June 15 – Kanna Arihara, singer
- June 21 – Reni Takagi, idol
- July 2 – Yosuke Kishi, singer and actor
- July 13 – Rena Nōnen, actress and fashion model
- July 14 – Sayaka Yamamoto, singer and actress
- July 15 – Masataka Yoshida, professional baseball player
- July 30 – Miho Miyazaki, singer and actress
- August 3 – Yurina Kumai, singer
- August 4 – Alan Shirahama, singer, dancer and actor
- August 5 – Suzuka Ohgo, child actress
- August 6 – Kaori Ishihara, voice actress
- August 9 – Kensuke Kondo, professional baseball player
- August 10 – Yuto Nakajima, singer
- August 24 – Aoi Koga, voice actress
- August 28 – Sora Amamiya, voice actress and singer.
- August 31 – Haruka Imai, figure skater
- September 1 – Shōta Imanaga, professional baseball player
- September 19 – Miyuki Watanabe, singer and model
- November 10 – Azusa Tadokoro, voice actress and singer
- November 15 – Saaya Irie, actress and model
- November 20 – Sumire Satō, actress and idol
- November 26 – Erena Ono, singer
- November 30 – Yuri Chinen, singer and actor
- December 7 – Kiyou Shimizu, karate martial artist
- December 15 – Yuko Araki, actress and model
- December 18 – Riria Kojima, actress
- December 23 – Ruriko Kojima, gravure idol and sportscaster
- December 24 – Mariya Nishiuchi, actress, model and singer-songwriter
- December 25 – Emi Takei, actress, model and singer
- December 28 – Yua Shinkawa, actress and model

== Deaths ==
- January 22: Kōbō Abe, author (b. 1924)
- February 9: Saburo Okita, former foreign minister (b. 1914)
- February 28: Ishirō Honda, film director (b. 1911)
- April 2: Masaichi Niimi, admiral in the Imperial Japanese Navy during the Second World War (b. 1887)
- July 3: Tadao Yoshida, founder of the YKK Group, the world's largest zipper manufacturer (b. 1908)
- July 10: Masuji Ibuse, writer (b. 1898)
- August 6: Genkei Masamune, botanist (b. 1899)
- August 21: Ichirō Fujiyama, composer and singer (b. 1911)
- October 29: Masahiro Makino, film director (b. 1908)
- November 14: Sanzō Nosaka, one of the founders of the Japanese Communist Party (b. 1892)
- December 16: Kakuei Tanaka, former Prime Minister of Japan (b. 1918)
- December 20: Iichirō Hatoyama, politician and diplomat (b. 1918)

== Statistics ==
- Yen value: US$1 = ¥109.91 (December 1)

== See also ==
- 1993 in Japanese television
- List of Japanese films of 1993
