= 1995 in Japan =

- Decades: 1970s; 1980s; 1990s; 2000s; 2010s
- See also: Other events of 1995; History of Japan; Timeline; Years

Events in the year 1995 in Japan. It corresponds to Heisei 7 (平成7年) in the Japanese calendar.

== Incumbents ==
- Emperor: Akihito
- Prime Minister: Tomiichi Murayama (S–Ōita)
- Chief Cabinet Secretary: Kōzō Igarashi (S–Hokkaidō) until August 8, Kōken Nosaka (S–Tottori)
- Chief Justice of the Supreme Court: Ryōhachi Kusaba until November 7, Tōru Miyoshi
- President of the House of Representatives: Takako Doi (S–Hyōgo)
- President of the House of Councillors: Bunbē Hara (L–Tokyo) until July 22, Jūrō Saitō (L–Mie) from August 4
- Diet sessions: 132nd (regular, January 20 to June 18), 133rd (extraordinary, August 4 to August 8), 134th (extraordinary, September 29 to December 15)

=== Governors ===
- Aichi Prefecture: Reiji Suzuki
- Akita Prefecture: Kikuji Sasaki
- Aomori Prefecture: Masaya Kitamura (until 26 February); Morio Kimura (starting 26 February)
- Chiba Prefecture: Takeshi Numata
- Ehime Prefecture: Sadayuki Iga
- Fukui Prefecture: Yukio Kurita
- Fukuoka Prefecture: Hachiji Okuda (until 22 April); Wataru Asō (starting 23 April)
- Fukushima Prefecture: Eisaku Satō
- Gifu Prefecture: Taku Kajiwara
- Gunma Prefecture: Hiroyuki Kodera
- Hiroshima Prefecture: Yūzan Fujita
- Hokkaido: Takahiro Yokomichi (until 22 April); Tatsuya Hori (starting 22 April)
- Hyogo Prefecture: Toshitami Kaihara
- Ibaraki Prefecture: Masaru Hashimoto
- Ishikawa Prefecture: Masanori Tanimoto
- Iwate Prefecture: Iwao Kudō (until 29 April); Hiroya Masuda (starting 30 April)
- Kagawa Prefecture: Jōichi Hirai
- Kagoshima Prefecture: Yoshiteru Tsuchiya
- Kanagawa Prefecture: Kazuji Nagasu (until 22 April); Hiroshi Okazaki (starting 23 April)
- Kochi Prefecture: Daijiro Hashimoto
- Kumamoto Prefecture: Joji Fukushima
- Kyoto Prefecture: Teiichi Aramaki
- Mie Prefecture: Ryōzō Tagawa (until 20 April); Masayasu Kitagawa (starting 21 April)
- Miyagi Prefecture: Shirō Asano
- Miyazaki Prefecture: Suketaka Matsukata
- Nagano Prefecture: Gorō Yoshimura
- Nagasaki Prefecture: Isamu Takada
- Nara Prefecture: Yoshiya Kakimoto
- Niigata Prefecture: Ikuo Hirayama
- Oita Prefecture: Morihiko Hiramatsu
- Okayama Prefecture: Shiro Nagano
- Okinawa Prefecture: Masahide Ōta
- Osaka Prefecture: Kazuo Nakagawa (until 22 April); Knock Yokoyama (starting 23 April)
- Saga Prefecture: Isamu Imoto
- Saitama Prefecture: Yoshihiko Tsuchiya
- Shiga Prefecture: Minoru Inaba
- Shiname Prefecture: Nobuyoshi Sumita
- Shizuoka Prefecture: Yoshinobu Ishikawa
- Tochigi Prefecture: Fumio Watanabe
- Tokushima Prefecture: Toshio Endo
- Tokyo: Shun'ichi Suzuki (until 23 April); Yukio Aoshima (starting 23 April)
- Tottori Prefecture: Yuji Nishio
- Toyama Prefecture: Yutaka Nakaoki
- Wakayama Prefecture: Shirō Kariya (until 22 November); Isamu Nishiguchi (starting 23 November)
- Yamagata Prefecture: Kazuo Takahashi
- Yamaguchi Prefecture: Toru Hirai
- Yamanashi Prefecture: Ken Amano

== Events ==
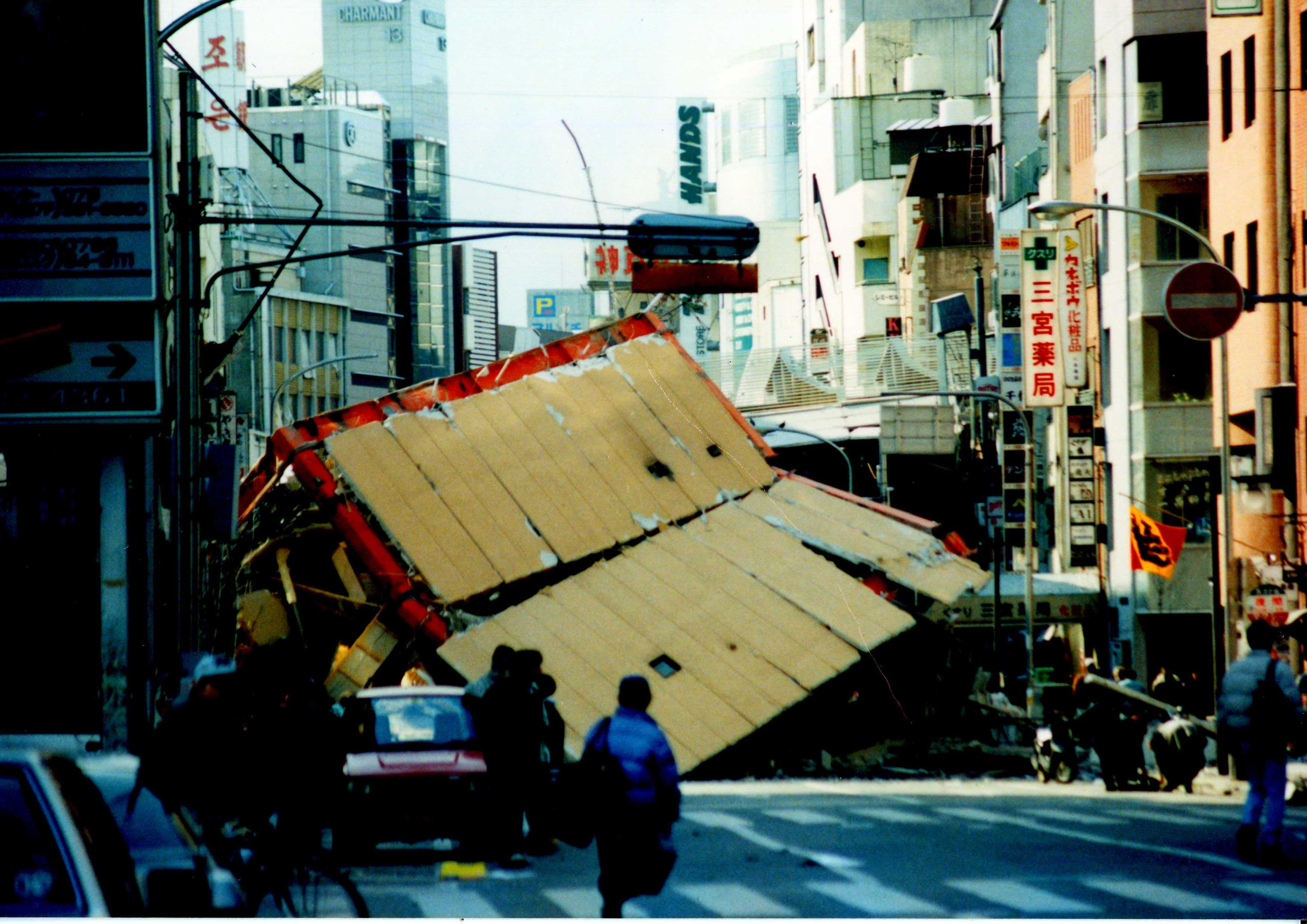
Damage in Sannomiya resulting from the Great Hanshin earthquake.

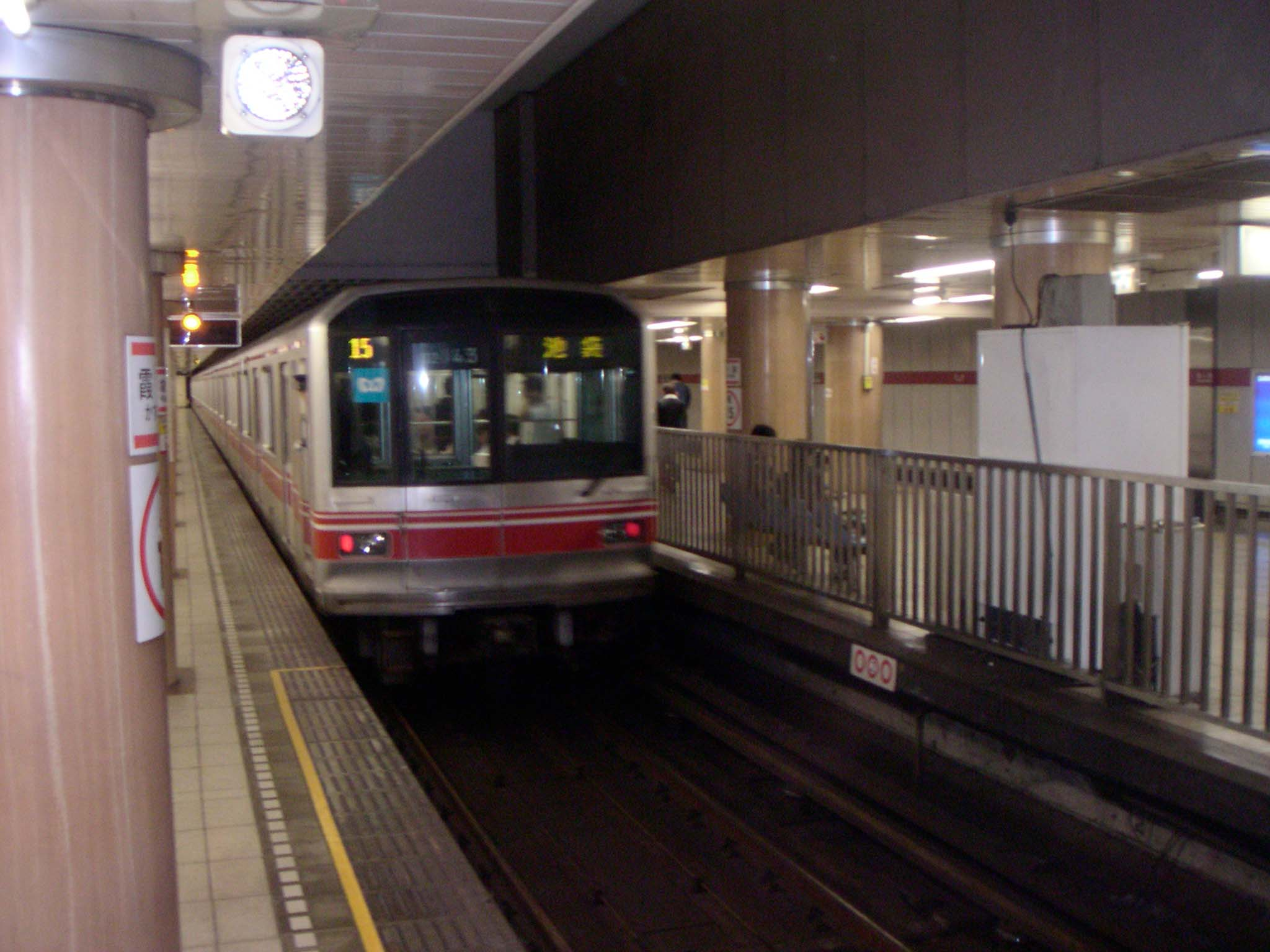
Kasumigaseki Station, one of the many stations affected during the Sarin gas attack.

- January 17 – The 6.9 M_{w} Great Hanshin earthquake shakes the southern Hyōgo Prefecture with a maximum Shindo of VII, leaving 5,502–6,434 people dead, and 251,301–310,000 displaced.
- February 21 – An MSDF helicopter falls into the Bungo Channel, causing 11 deaths.
- March 20 - Members of the Aum Shinrikyo religious cult carry out a Sarin gas attack on the Tokyo subway, killing 12 and injuring more than 6,000.
- March 30 – A police officer tries to assassinate Takaji Kunimatsu, Commissioner General of the National Police Agency, outside his home in Arakawa Ward, Tokyo.
- April 9 - In a series of gubernatorial elections held across Japan, Yukio Aoshima and Knock Yokoyama become governors of Tokyo and Osaka respectively.
- May 12 – A bomb goes off in a men's public lavatory on the third floor of the Terminal 2 building of New Tokyo International Airport, Narita.
- May 16 - Japanese police besiege the headquarters of Aum Shinrikyo in Kamikuishiki, Yamanashi Prefecture at the foot of Mount Fuji and arrest cult leader Shoko Asahara.
- May 31 - Governor of Tokyo Yukio Aoshima cancels a costly "World City" exposition that Governor Shun'ichi Suzuki planned to have held in Odaiba in 1996, which had formed the bulk of the basis for Aoshima's gubernatorial campaign.
- June 22 - Japanese police rescue 365 hostages from a hijacked All Nippon Airways Flight 857 (Boeing 747-200) at Hakodate airport. The hijacker, Fumio Kutsumi, was armed with a screw driver and demanded the release of Shoko Asahara.
- July 23 - House of Councillors election held. The recently created New Frontier Party replaced the Japanese Socialist Party as the second largest political party in Japan, and entered coalition with the Liberal Democratic Party. The Socialists lost many seats in this election.
- July 30 – During an armed robbery at a Hachioji, Tokyo supermarket, three female employees are killed.
- September 1 – Mysterious death of Akiyo Asaki, a Tokyo councilwoman under unclear circumstances.
- September 4 – 1995 Okinawa rape incident: Three U.S. servicemen serving at Camp Hansen on Okinawa kidnap and gang rape a 12-year-old Japanese girl. The incident led to further debate over the continued presence of U.S. forces in Japan.
- October 26 - Mitsubishi Motors releases the Mitsubishi Pajero Junior mini SUV.
- November 18 - November 19 - APEC summit held in Osaka, the first in Japan.

== Births ==
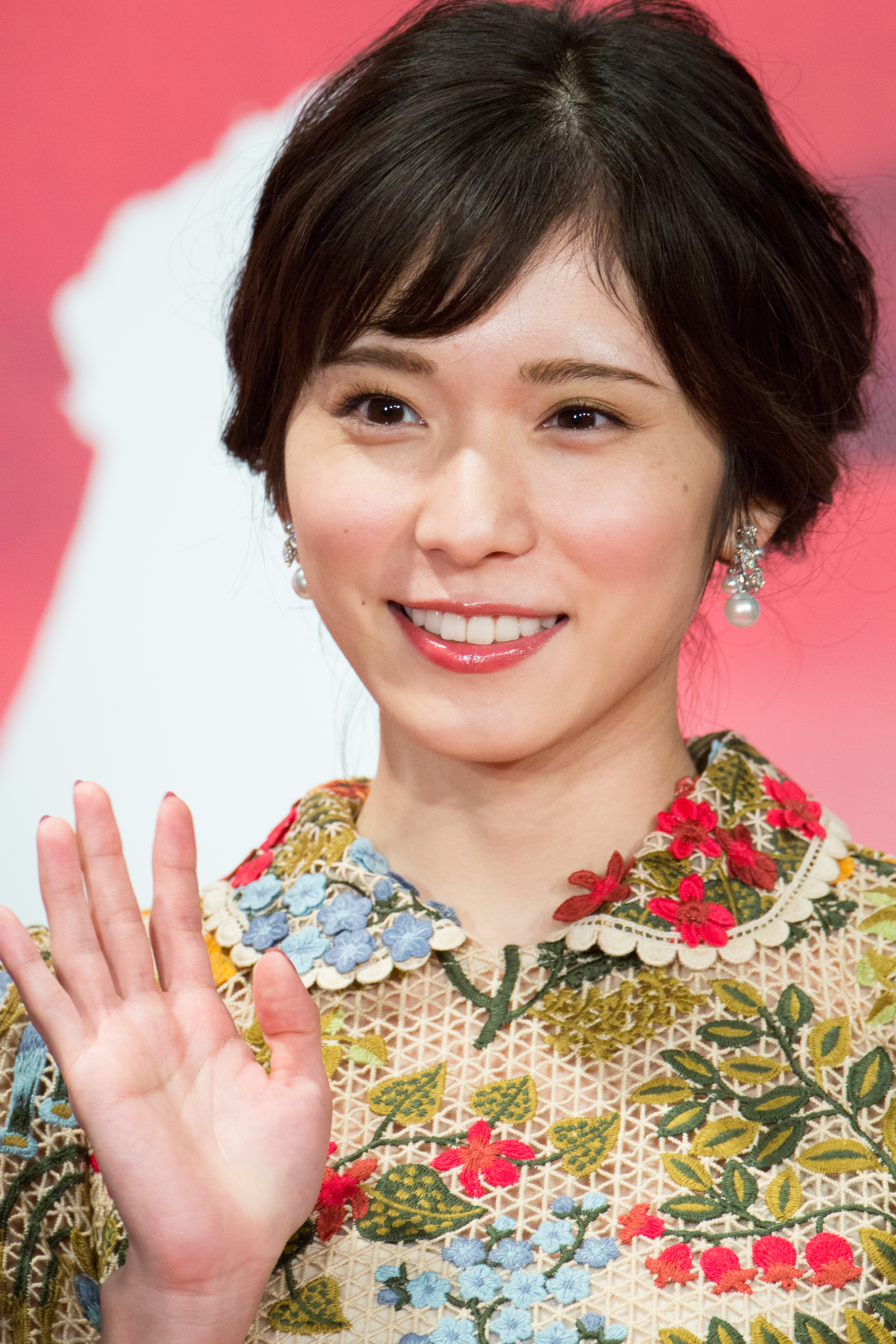
Mayu Matsuoka

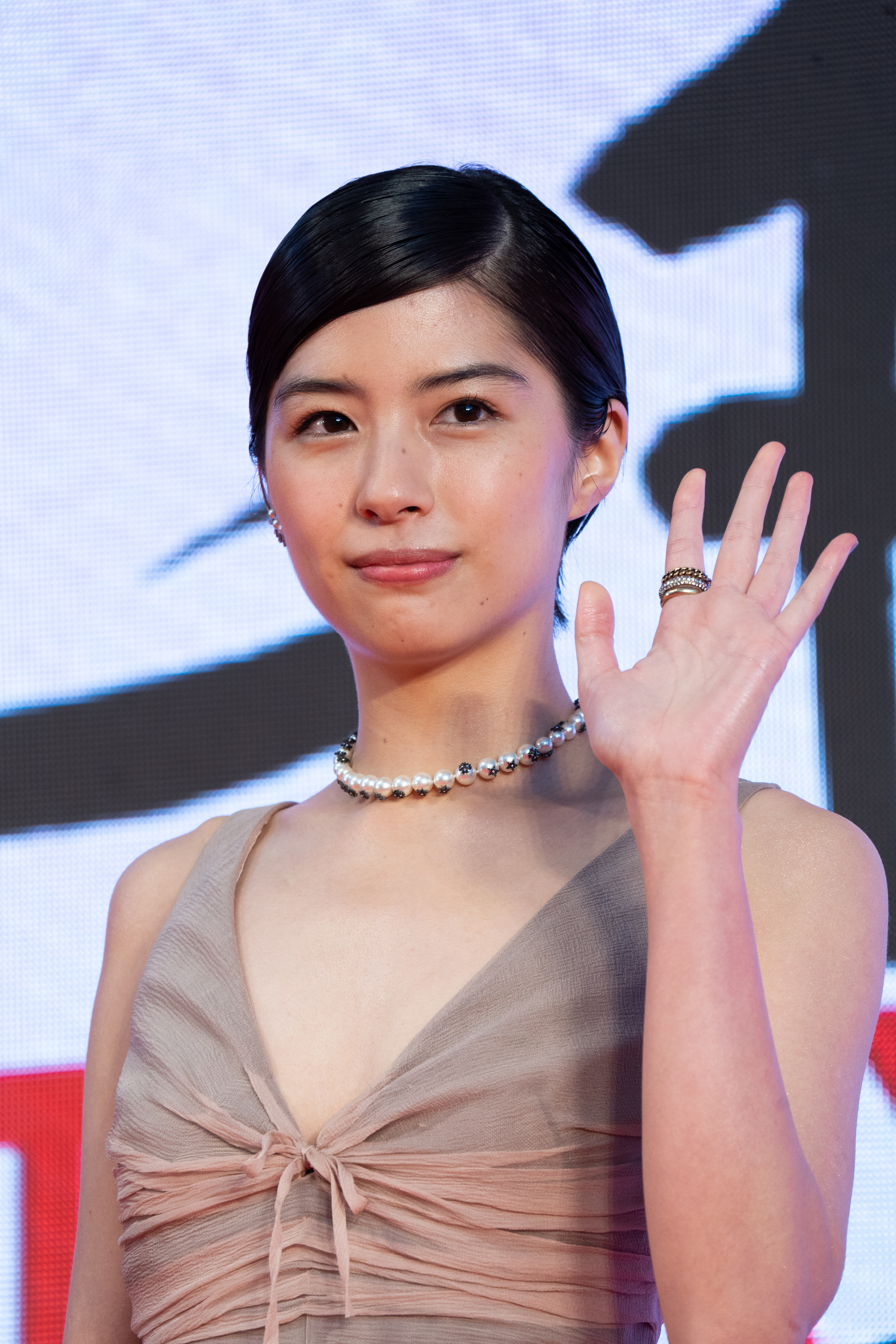
Yui Sakuma

- January 16 - Takumi Minamino, footballer
- January 24 - Yū Wakui, Japanese voice actor
- January 25 - Masaya Matsumoto, footballer
- January 26 – Seiya Matsubara, professional baseball player
- January 30 - Misaki Iwasa, singer
- February 3 - Tao Tsuchiya, actress
- February 8 - Naoki Yoshikawa, professional baseball player
- February 10 - Haruna Kawaguchi, actress and model
- February 12
  - Ryuju Hino, figure skater
  - Rina Kawaei, singer
- February 13 - Ayame Koike, actress
- February 16
  - Nikki Havenaar, footballer
  - Mayu Matsuoka, actress
- March 6 - Aimyon, singer-songwriter
- March 7 - Fuma Kikuchi, actor, dancer and singer
- March 10 - Yui Sakuma, model and actress
- March 11 - Kazuki Fukai, footballer
- March 12 - Kanon Fukuda, singer and voice actress
- March 13 - Ryutarou Akimoto, actor and model
- March 15 - Momoka Ariyasu, singer
- March 17 - Akari Hayami, actress, model and singer
- March 28 - Kouji Miura, manga artist
- April 6 - Ryutaro Morimoto, singer
- April 14 - Yukiko Fujisawa, figure skater
- June 2 - Evelyn Mawuli, basketball player
- June 4 - Shiori Tamai, singer
- June 8 - Akari Saho, musician
- June 9 - Shintaro Yokota, baseball player (d. 2023)
- June 12 - Mao Murakami, dancer
- June 17 - Aoi Morikawa, actress and model
- July 2 - Tomoko Kanazawa, pop singer
- July 30 - Yuhi, wrestler
- August 8 - Miyabi Oba, figure skater
- August 15 - Yui Ogura, actress, pop idol and singer
- August 24 - Anna Doi, sprinter
- September 12 - Kako Tomotaki, figure skater
- September 14 - Kazuto Taguchi, professional baseball player
- September 22
  - Ai Hazuki, actress
  - Taisuke Yamaoka, professional baseball player
- September 23 - Aimi Kobayashi, pianist
- September 27 - Yoshihito Nishioka, professional tennis player
- October 26 - Yuta Nakamoto, pop idol and singer
- October 29 - Taku Hiraoka, snowboarder
- November 2 - Rei Takahashi, professional baseball player
- November 7 - Runa Natsui, actress
- November 19 - Asuka Teramoto, gymnast
- December 2 - Inori Minase, actress, voice actress and singer
- December 3 - Anna Iriyama, singer
- December 15 - Yoshihide Kiryū, track and field sprinter
- December 29 - Rina Ikoma, singer

== Deaths ==
- February 24
  - Tatsumi Kumashiro, film director (b. 1927)
  - Hideko Maehata, swimmer (b. 1914)
- March 19 – Yasuo Yamada, voice actor (b. 1932)
- July 5 – Takeo Fukuda, politician (b. 1905)
- August 25 – Setsuko, Princess Chichibu, wife of Prince Chichibu (b. 1909)
- September 25 – Kei Tomiyama, actor, voice actor and narrator (b. 1938)
- November 26 – Toshia Mori, actress (b. 1912)
- December 20 – Masako Katsura, billiards player (b. 1913)

== See also ==
- 1995 in Japanese television
- List of Japanese films of 1995
