= 1912 in Japan =

- Decades: 1890s; 1900s; 1910s; 1920s; 1930s
- See also: Other events of 1912; History of Japan • Timeline • Years

Events in the year 1912 in Japan. In the history of Japan, it marks the final year of the Meiji period, Meiji 45 (明治45年), upon the death of Emperor Meiji on July 30, and the beginning of the Taishō Period, Taishō 1 (大正元年), upon the accession of his son Emperor Taishō.

== Incumbents ==
- Emperor:
  - Emperor Meiji (until July 30)
  - Emperor Taishō (starting July 30)
- Prime Minister:
  - Saionji Kinmochi (until December 21)
  - Katsura Tarō (starting December 21)

=== Governors ===
- Aichi Prefecture: Ichizo Fukano then Kenzo Ishihara
- Akita Prefecture: Mori Masataka then Toyosuke Haneda
- Aomori Prefecture: Takeda Chiyosaburo
- Ehime Prefecture: Egi Yasunao
- Fukui Prefecture: Nakamura Junkuro then Tokiwa Ikematsu
- Fukushima Prefecture: Morisuke Yamayoshi
- Gifu Prefecture: Sadakichi Usu
- Gunma Prefecture: Uruji Kamiyama
- Hiroshima Prefecture: Tadashi Munakata then Nakamura Junkuro
- Ibaraki Prefecture: Keisuke Sakanaka then Okada
- Iwate Prefecture: Shinichi Kasai
- Kagawa Prefecture: Kogoro Kanokogi
- Kochi Prefecture: Shoichi Omori
- Kumamoto Prefecture: Kawaji Toshikyo then Tadashi Munakata then Ueyama Mitsunoshin
- Kyoto Prefecture: Shoichi Omori
- Mie Prefecture: Kamon Furusha
- Miyagi Prefecture: [[]]
- Miyazaki Prefecture: [[]]
- Nagano Prefecture: [[]]
- Nara Prefecture: [[]]
- Niigata Prefecture: [[]]
- Oita Prefecture: [[]]
- Okayama Prefecture: [[]]
- Okinawa Prefecture: [[]]
- Osaka Prefecture: [[]]
- Saga Prefecture: [[]]
- Saitama Prefecture: [[]]
- Shiname Prefecture: [[]]
- Tochigi Prefecture: [[]]
- Tokushima Prefecture: [[]]
- Tokyo: [[]]
- Tottori Prefecture: [[]]
- Toyama Prefecture: [[]]
- Yamagata Prefecture: [[]]
- Yamaguchi Prefecture: [[]]
- Yamanashi Prefecture: [[]]

== Events ==
- January 21 – Japan's first skiing competition is held at Takada in Niigata Prefecture.
- January 28 – Lieutenant Nobu Shirase and 27 others reach a point at the South Pole 80 degrees 5' south and 156 degrees 37'. They name it Yamato Sekihara.
- March unknown date – Yanmar has founded, as predecessor name was Yamaoka Engineer Works.
- March 27 – Tokyo Mayor Yukio Ozaki gives 3,000 Cherry blossom trees to be planted in Washington, D.C., to symbolize the friendship between the two countries.
- April 1 – Yoshimoto Kogyo was founded.
- May 5–July 22 – Japan competes at the Summer Olympic Games for the first time at the 1912 Summer Olympics in Stockholm, Sweden.
- May 15 – 1912 Japanese general election: The result was a victory for the Rikken Seiyūkai party, which won 209 of the 381 seats. The 381 members of the House of Representatives were elected in 51 multi-member constituencies based on prefectures and cities. Voting was restricted to men aged over 25 who paid at least 10 yen a year in direct taxation.
- June 5 – Tsuruko Haraguchi is awarded a PhD in psychology from Columbia University, becoming the first Japanese woman to earn a PhD in any field.
- July 30 – Emperor Meiji dies. He is succeeded by his son Yoshihito who becomes Emperor Taishō. In the history of Japan, the event marks the end of the Meiji period and the beginning of the Taishō period.
- September 13 – Burial of Emperor Meiji in Kyoto.
- October 12 – Taisho Pharmaceutical was founded by Kinujirō Ishii.
- December – Taishō political was in crisis.
- December 21 – Saionji Kinmochi resigns as Prime Minister of Japan and is succeeded by Katsura Tarō.
- date unknown
  - Ebara Corporation was founded.
  - Mori Women's School, as predecessor of Kobe Gakuin University was founded in Hyogo Prefecture.

== Births ==
- January 1 – Toshia Mori, actress (d. 1995)
- February 3 – Kazuo Dan, novelist and poet (d. 1976)
- February 20 – Seiji Hisamatsu, film director (d. 1990)
- February 29 – Taiichi Ohno, industrial engineer and businessman (d. 1990)
- March 27 – Ken'ichi Yoshida, literary scholar (d. 1977)
- April 19 – Genji Keita, novelist and writer (d. 1985)
- April 22 – Kaneto Shindo, film director and producer (d. 2012)
- June 5 – Ryūtarō Ōtomo, film actor (d. 1985)
- July 20 – Hideo Itokawa, rocket scientist (d. 1999)
- August 2 – Masaaki Iinuma, aviator, flew the first Japanese-built aircraft from Japan to Europe (d. 1941)
- August 15 – Naoto Tajima, athlete (d. 1990)
- August 31 – Katsumi Tezuka, actor (d. unknown)
- September 22 – Masao Harada, athlete (d. 2000)
- October 4 – Hirohide Fushimi, Navy career Officer (d. 1943)
- December 5 – Keisuke Kinoshita, film director (d. 1998)
- December 10 – Tetsuji Takechi, theater and film director (d. 1988)

== Deaths ==
- January 4 – Higashikuze Michitomi, statesman (b. 1834)
- January 27 – Nishi Kanjirō, career soldier (b. 1846)
- February 12 – Tsunetaro Moriyama, baseball player (b. 1880)
- March 13 – Nishi Tokujirō politician and diplomat (b. 1847)
- April 2 – Ishimoto Shinroku, general (b. 1854)
- April 13 – Takuboku Ishikawa, poet (b. 1886)
- April 28 – Yuri Kimimasa, politician (b. 1829)
- July 30 – Emperor Meiji, 122nd Emperor of Japan (b. 1852)
- September 13:
  - Nogi Maresuke, general and Governor-General of Taiwan (suicide) (b. 1849)
  - Nogi Shizuko, wife of Nogi Maresuke (suicide) (b. 1859)
- September 23 – Yokoyama Sakujiro, judoka (b. 1864)
- October 5 – Hozumi Yatsuka, law scholar (b. 1860)
- December 2 – Kawasaki Shōzō, industrialist and shipbuilder (b. 1837)
- December 13 – Yūjirō Motora, psychologist (b. 1858)
- Unknown:
  - Toyohara Chikanobu, woodblock artist (b. 1838)
  - Suzuki Shin'ichi II, photographer (b. 1855)
