= Rinne Yoshida =

Japanese idol singer and rapper

- Born: December 11, 2000 (age 25)
- Origin: Hokkaido, Japan
- Genre: J-pop
- Years active: 2014–present
- Label: Versionmusic
- Member of: P-each
- Formerly of: Merci♡Coco; Riririnne

Rinne Yoshida (吉田 凜音; born 11 December 2000) is a Japanese idol singer and rapper. She has an active solo career.

== Discography ==
=== Singles ===
No.	Title	Release date	Charts	Album
No.	Title	Release date	JPN Oricon	Album
1	"Koi no Sanctuary!" (恋のサンクチュアリ!)	November 5, 2014	39	Fantaskie
2	"Wasurenai Place / Tensei Rinne (Gong! Gong! Gong!)" (忘れないPlace/テンセイリンネ〜GONG!GONG!GONG!〜)	February 25, 2015	81	Fantaskie

=== Albums ===
No.	Album delails	Charts
No.	Album delails	JPN Oricon
1	Fantaskie: Released: March 25, 2015	127

=== DVD ===
- Let's Vocadance! (レッツボカロダンス!)（June 27, 2013）

=== Music videos ===
Title
"Koi no Sanctuary!"
"Manatsu no BeeeeeeaM."

== Filmography ==
=== Film ===
- Humanoid Monster Bela (2020)
- Between Us (2021)
