= Kiichirō Kumagai =

Japanese politician

- 熊谷 喜一郎
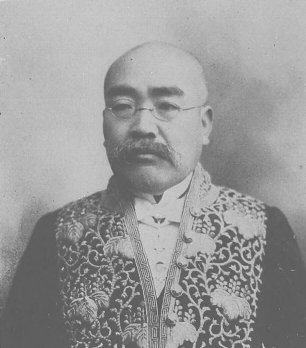

Governor of Ishikawa Prefecture
- In office 28 April 1914 – 1 April 1915
- Monarch: Taishō
- Preceded by: Nakasuke Saka
- Succeeded by: Ōta Masahiro

Governor of Yamanashi Prefecture
- In office 12 June 1908 – 1 June 1913
- Monarchs: Meiji; Taishō
- Preceded by: Chiyosaburō Takeda
- Succeeded by: Raizo Wakabayashi

Director of the Karafuto Agency
- In office 28 July 1905 – 31 March 1907
- Monarch: Meiji
- Preceded by: Office established
- Succeeded by: Kusunose Yukihiko

Personal details
- Born: 26 May 1866 Edo, Musashi, Japan
- Died: 9 October 1949 (aged 83)
- Education: Tokyo Imperial University

Kiichirō Kumagai (Japanese: 熊谷喜一郎; 26 May 1866 – 9 October 1949) was the first Director of South Karafuto (Karafuto Civil Administration, 1905–1907). He was governor of Yamanashi Prefecture (1908–1913) and Ishikawa Prefecture (1914–1915). He was a graduate of Tokyo Imperial University. He was a recipient of the Order of the Rising Sun. He was from Musashi Province.

Preceded by New office	Director of the Karafuto Agency; 1905–1907	Succeeded by Kusunose Yukihiko
Preceded by	Governor of Yamanashi Prefecture; 1908-1913	Succeeded by
Preceded by	Governor of Ishikawa Prefecture; 1914-1915	Succeeded by Ōta Masahiro
