= Masaji Iguro =

Japanese ski jumper

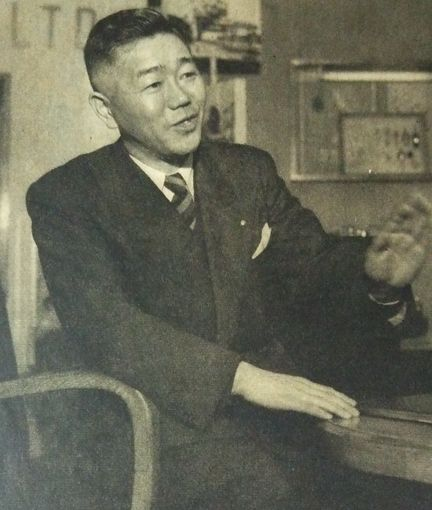
Iguro Masaji.JPG

Masaji Iguro (Japanese: 伊黒正次; May 14, 1913 – October 4, 2000) was a Japanese ski jumper who competed in the 1930s.

At the 1936 Winter Olympics in Garmisch-Partenkirchen, he finished seventh in the individual large hill competition.
