= Yasukouchi Asakichi =

Japanese politician

- 安河内 麻吉
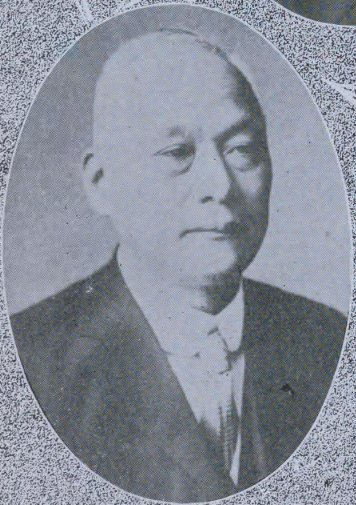

Governor of Kanagawa Prefecture
- In office 16 October 1922 – 24 June 1922
- Monarch: Taishō
- Preceded by: Kosai Inoue
- Succeeded by: Seino Chōtarō

Governor of Fukuoka Prefecture
- In office 18 April 1919 – 6 October 1922
- Monarch: Taishō
- Preceded by: Taniguchi Tomegoro
- Succeeded by: Ushimaro Sawada

Governor of Hiroshima Prefecture
- In office 7 May 1918 – 18 April 1919
- Monarch: Taishō
- Preceded by: Eitaro Mabuchi
- Succeeded by: Raizo Wakabayashi

Governor of Shizuoka Prefecture
- In office 12 August 1915 – 7 May 1918
- Monarch: Taishō
- Preceded by: Yuasa Kurahei
- Succeeded by: Akaike Atsushi

Personal details
- Born: 15 April 1873 Sue, Fukuoka, Japan
- Died: 15 July 1927 (aged 54)
- Education: Tokyo Imperial University

Yasukouchi Asakichi (15 April 1873 – 15 July 1927) was a Japanese politician who served as governor of Hiroshima Prefecture from May 1918 to April 1919. He was governor of Shizuoka Prefecture (1915–1918), Fukuoka Prefecture (1919–1922) and Kanagawa Prefecture (1922–1924).
