= Kiuchi Jūshirō =

Japanese politician

- 木内 重四郎
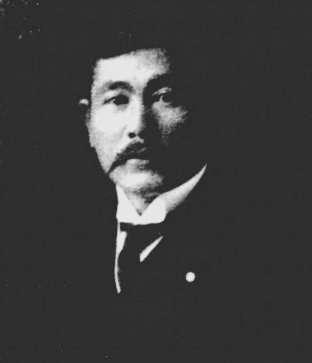

Governor of Kyoto Prefecture
- In office April 1916 – May 1918
- Monarch: Taishō
- Preceded by: Shōichi Ōmori
- Succeeded by: Eitaro Mabuchi

Member of the House of Peers
- In office 24 August 1911 – 9 January 1925 Nominated by the Emperor

Personal details
- Born: 26 January 1866 Sanbu, Chiba, Japan
- Died: 9 January 1925 (aged 58) Ichikawa, Chiba, Japan
- Relatives: Katō Takaaki (brother-in-law); Kijūrō Shidehara (brother-in-law); Keizo Shibusawa (son-in-law)
- Education: Tokyo Imperial University

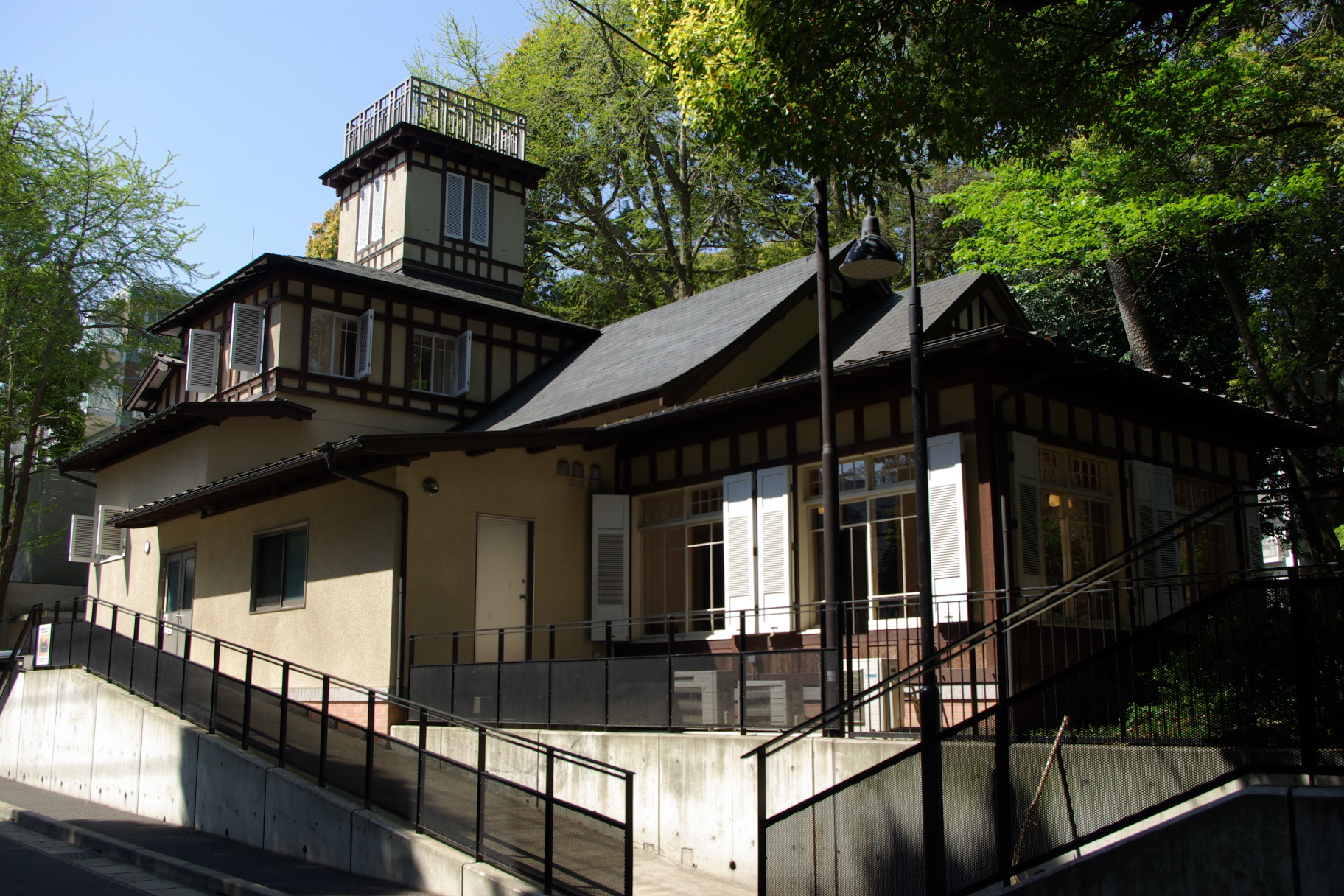
Ichikawa City's Kiuchi Gallery

Kiuchi Jūshirō (木内 重四郎; 26 January 1866 – 9 January 1925) was a Japanese politician. He was educated at Chiba Middle School and Chiba First High School, and later graduated from Imperial Tokyo University's Department of Political Science. In 1906, while serving as a Japanese representative in Korea, Kiuchi made a bet with Durham Stevens, an American advisor to the Korean government, about the length of time before Japan would annex Korea. Kiuchi expected it would only take three years; Stevens' guess of five years would prove to be more nearly correct, as the Japan–Korea Annexation Treaty was signed in mid-1910. In January 1909, Kiuchi was one of a number of politicians who brought pressure to bear against Itō Hirobumi and his allegedly soft policies towards Korea, urging that Japan should exercise direct rule there; it was suggested that Kiuchi took this position due to his dissatisfaction with being shifted from Vice-Minister of Home Affairs to Vice-Minister of Agriculture. He later served as a member of the House of Peers and then from 1916–1918 as Governor of Kyoto Prefecture.

Kiuchi's former residence, located in Ichikawa, Chiba, was maintained as a historical building and tourist attraction for some years, but was being considered for dismantling as of 2001.
