= Terada Yushi =

Japanese politician

- 寺田 祐之
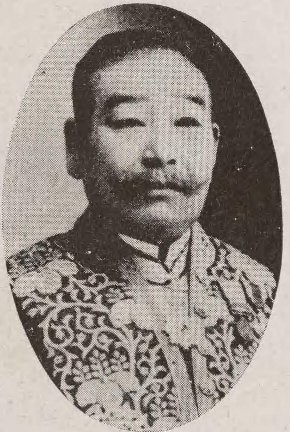

Governor of Hiroshima Prefecture
- In office 27 February 1913 – 28 April 1916
- Monarch: Taishō
- Preceded by: Junkurō Nakamura
- Succeeded by: Eitaro Mabuchi

Governor of Miyagi Prefecture
- In office 20 July 1908 – 27 February 1913
- Monarchs: Meiji; Taishō
- Preceded by: Eizaburō Kamei
- Succeeded by: Mori Masataka

Governor of Okayama Prefecture
- In office 28 July 1906 – 20 July 1908
- Monarch: Meiji
- Preceded by: Higaki Naosuke
- Succeeded by: Taniguchi Tomegoro

Governor of Tottori Prefecture
- In office 2 April 1901 – 28 July 1906
- Monarch: Meiji
- Preceded by: Kagawa Teru
- Succeeded by: Shin'ichirō Yamada

Personal details
- Born: 27 January 1857 Iiyama, Shinano, Japan
- Died: 14 March 1917 (aged 60) Akasaka, Tokyo, Japan
- Resting place: Aoyama Cemetery

Terada Yushi (27 January 1851 – 14 March 1917) was a Japanese politician who served as governor of Tottori Prefecture (1901–1906), Okayama Prefecture (1906–1908), Miyagi Prefecture (1908–1913) and Hiroshima Prefecture from February 1913 to April 1916.
