= Hiroshi Okazaki =

Japanese shogi player

- Native name: 岡崎洋
- Born: May 4, 1967 (age 58)
- Hometown: Chiba Prefecture

Career
- Achieved professional status: October 1, 1993 (aged 26)
- Badge Number: 209
- Rank: 7-dan
- Teacher: Hirokichi Hirano (7-dan)
- Meijin class: Free
- Ryūō class: 6

Websites
- JSA profile page

Hiroshi Okazaki (岡崎 洋, Okazaki Hiroshi; born May 4, 1967) is a Japanese professional shogi player ranked 7-dan.

== Shogi professional ==
=== Promotion history ===
The promotion history for Okazaki is as follows:

- 6-kyū: 1981
- 1-dan: 1986
- 4-dan: October 1, 1993
- 5-dan: April 1, 1998
- 6-dan: June 15, 2004
- 7-dan: February 19, 2018
