= Japan during World War I =

Period of Japanese history from 1914 to 1918

Japan participated in World War I from 1914 to 1918 as a member of the Allies/Entente and played an important role against the Imperial German Navy. Politically, the Japanese Empire seized the opportunity to expand its sphere of influence in China, and to gain recognition as a great power in postwar geopolitics.

Japan's military, taking advantage of the great distances and Imperial Germany's preoccupation with the war in Europe, seized German possessions in the Pacific and East Asia, but there was no large-scale mobilization of the economy. Foreign Minister Katō Takaaki and Prime Minister Ōkuma Shigenobu wanted to use the opportunity to expand Japanese influence in China. They enlisted Sun Yat-sen (1866–1925), then in exile in Japan, but they had little success. The Imperial Japanese Navy, a nearly autonomous bureaucratic institution, made its own decision to undertake expansion in the Pacific area. It captured Germany's Micronesian territories north of the equator, and ruled the islands until they were transitioned to civilian control in 1921. The operation gave the Navy a rationale for enlarging its budget to double the Army budget and expanding the fleet. The Navy then gained significant political influence over national and international affairs.

== Events of 1914 ==
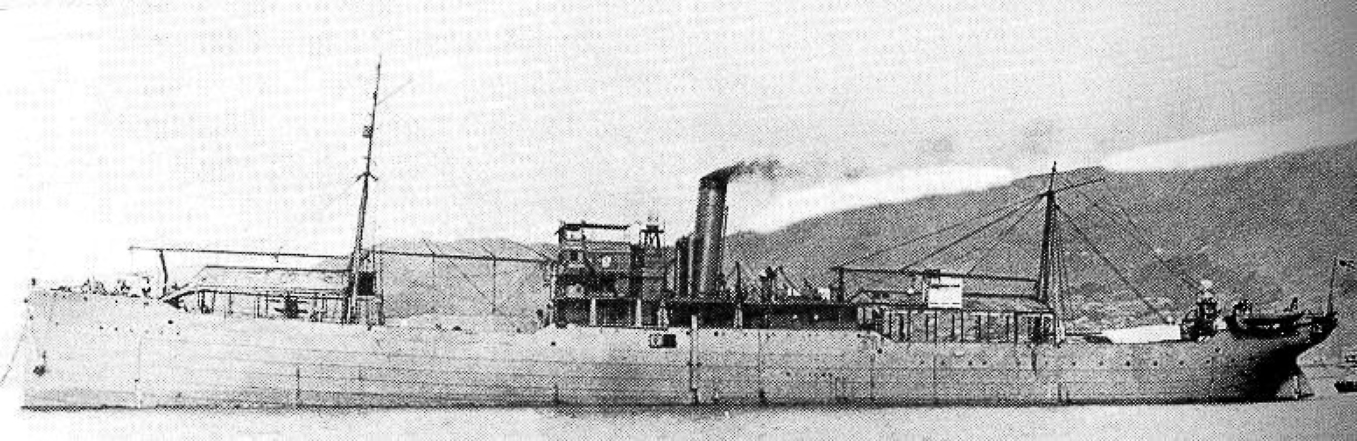
Japanese seaplane carrier Wakamiya (1913)

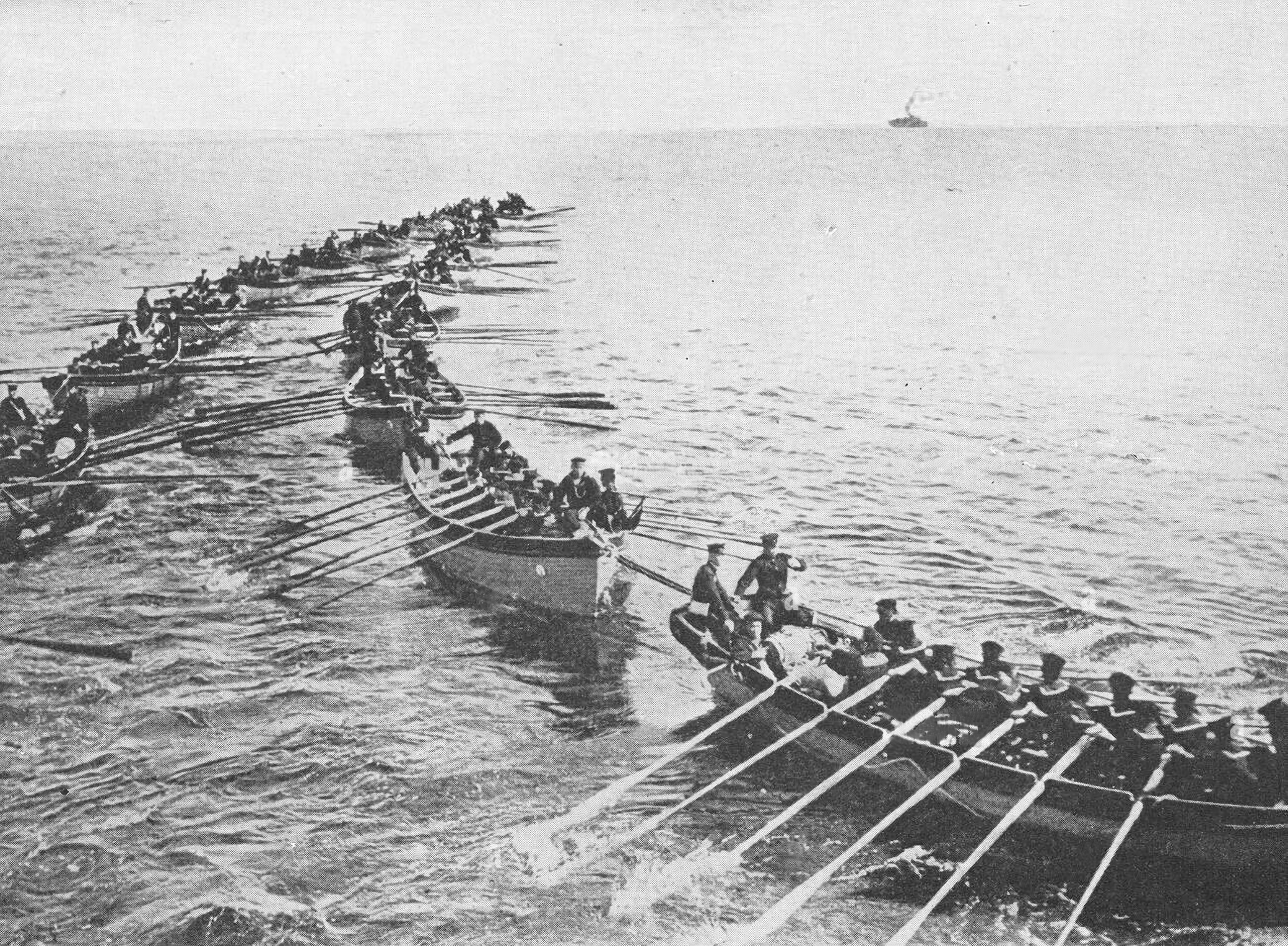
Japanese troops landing near Qingdao

In the first week of World War I, Japan proposed to the United Kingdom that Japan would enter the war if it could take Germany's Pacific territories. On 7 August 1914, the British government officially asked Japan for assistance in destroying the Imperial German Navy in and around Chinese waters. Japan sent Germany an ultimatum on 15 August 1914, which went unanswered; Japan then formally declared war on Germany on 23 August 1914 in the name of the Emperor Taishō. As Vienna refused to withdraw the Austro-Hungarian cruiser SMS Kaiserin Elisabeth from Qingdao, Japan declared war on Austria-Hungary, too, on 25 August 1914.

Japanese forces quickly occupied German-leased territories in the Far East. On September 2 1914, Japanese forces landed on China's Shandong province and surrounded the German settlement at Tsingtao. During October, acting virtually independently of the civil government, the Imperial Japanese Navy seized several of Germany's island colonies in the Pacific—the Mariana, Caroline, and Marshall Islands—with virtually no resistance as, while they were part of German New Guinea, the islands were administered by German colonial officers with only small police forces of local Pacific islanders to defend them. There were small clashes between the defenders and the landing Japanese troops, but this did little to stop the Japanese takeover. The Japanese Navy conducted the world's first naval-launched air raids against German-held land targets in Shandong province and ships in Qiaozhou Bay from the seaplane-carrier Wakamiya. On 6 September 1914, a seaplane launched by Wakamiya unsuccessfully attacked the Kaiserin Elisabeth and the German gunboat Jaguar with bombs.

The Siege of Tsingtao (Qingdao) concluded with the surrender of German colonial forces on 7 November 1914.

In September 1914, by request of the Imperial Japanese Army, the Japanese Red Cross Society put together three squads, each composed of one surgeon and twenty nurses, which were dispatched to Europe on a five-month assignment. The teams left Japan between October and December 1914 and were assigned to Petrograd, Paris, and Southampton. The arrival of these nurses received wide press coverage, and their host countries subsequently asked for these teams to extend their assignment to fifteen months.

Japan also sent its armored cruiser Ibuki to assist with the protection of the Australian Imperial Force (AIF) troop convoy (which included contingents from New Zealand) as it sailed from Western Australia to Egypt on 1 November 1914.

== Events of 1915–1916 ==
With Japan's European allies heavily involved in the war in Europe, Japan sought to further consolidate its position in China by presenting the Twenty-One Demands to Chinese President Yuan Shikai in January 1915. If achieved, the Twenty-One Demands would have essentially reduced China to a Japanese protectorate, and at the expense of numerous privileges already enjoyed by the European powers in their respective spheres of influence within China. In the face of slow negotiations with the Chinese government, widespread and increasing anti-Japanese sentiments, and international condemnation (particularly from the United States), Japan withdrew the final group of demands, and a treaty was signed by China on 25 May 1915.

Throughout 1915–1916, German efforts to negotiate a separate peace with Japan failed. On 3 July 1916, Japan and Russia signed a treaty whereby each pledged not to make a separate peace with Germany, and agreed to consultation and common action should the territory or interests of each in China be threatened by an outside third party. Although Russia had a claim to Chinese territory by the Kyakhta and other treaties, Japan discouraged Russia from annexing Heilongjiang and began to slowly push the other powers out, such as the Germans in the Twenty-One Demands (1915). The delineating line between Russian (north) and Japanese (south) spheres of influences in China was the Chinese Eastern Railway.

In February 1915, marines from the Imperial Japanese Navy ships based in Singapore helped suppress a mutiny by Indian troops against the British government.

== Events of 1917 ==
On 18 December 1916, the British Admiralty again requested naval assistance from Japan. The new Japanese cabinet under Prime Minister Terauchi Masatake was more favorably inclined to provide military assistance, provided that the British government back Japan's territorial claims to the newly acquired German possessions in the South Pacific and Shandong. When Germany announced the resumption of unrestricted submarine warfare on 1 February 1917, the British government agreed.

Two of the four cruisers of the First Special Squadron at Singapore were sent to Cape Town, South Africa, and four destroyers were sent to the Mediterranean for basing out of Malta, headquarters of the Royal Navy's Mediterranean Fleet. Rear-Admiral Kōzō Satō on the cruiser Akashi and 10th and 11th destroyer units (eight destroyers) arrived in Malta on 13 April 1917 via Colombo and Port Said. Eventually this Second Special Squadron totaled three cruisers (Akashi, Izumo, Nisshin, 14 destroyers (8 Kaba-class destroyer, 4 Momo-class destroyer, 2 ex-British Acorn-class), 2 sloops, 1 tender (Kanto).

The 17 ships of Second Special Squadron carried out escort duties for troop transports and anti-submarine operations against attacks from German and Austro-Hungarian submarines operating from bases along the eastern Adriatic, the Aegean Sea, from Constantinople, thus securing the vital eastern Mediterranean sea route between the Suez Canal and Marseille, France.

The Japanese squadron made a total of 348 escort sorties from Malta, escorting 789 ships containing around 700,000 soldiers, thus contributing greatly to the war effort, for a total loss of 72 Japanese sailors killed in action. A total of 7,075 people were rescued by the Japanese from damaged and sinking ships. This included the rescue by the destroyers Matsu and Sakaki of nearly 3,000 persons from the troopship SS Transylvania, which was hit by a German torpedo on 4 May 1917. No Japanese ships were lost during the deployment but on 11 June 1917 Sakaki was hit by a torpedo from the Austro-Hungarian submarine U-27 off Crete; 59 Japanese sailors died.

With the American entry into World War I on 6 April 1917, the United States and Japan found themselves on the same side, despite their increasingly acrimonious relations over China and competition for influence in the Pacific. This led to the Lansing–Ishii Agreement of 2 November 1917 to help reduce tensions.

On July 9, Commander Kyōsuke Eto, military attaché with the Royal Navy, was killed in the Vanguard disaster.

In late 1917, Japan exported 12 Arabe-class destroyers, based on Kaba-class design, to France.

The British under Admiral George Alexander Ballard gave strong praise to the high operational rate of the Japanese squadron, and its quick response to all British requests. In return, the Japanese absorbed British anti-submarine warfare techniques and technologies and gained invaluable operational experience. After the end of the war, the Japanese Navy brought back seven German submarines as prizes of war, which greatly contributed to future Japanese submarine design and development.

== Events of 1918 ==
In 1918, Japan continued to extend its influence and privileges in China via the Nishihara Loans. Following the Bolshevik Revolution in Russia, Japan and the United States sent forces to Siberia in 1918 to bolster the armies of the White movement leader Admiral Alexander Kolchak against the Bolshevik Red Army. In this Siberian Intervention, the Imperial Japanese Army initially planned to send more than 70,000 troops to occupy Siberia as far west as Lake Baikal. The plan was scaled back considerably due to opposition from the United States.

Toward the end of the war, Japan increasingly filled orders for needed war material for its European allies. The wartime boom helped to diversify the country's industry, increase its exports, and transform Japan from a debtor to a creditor nation for the first time. Exports quadrupled from 1913 to 1918. The massive capital influx into Japan and the subsequent industrial boom led to rapid inflation. In August 1918, rice riots caused by this inflation erupted in towns and cities throughout Japan.

== Events of 1919 ==
The year 1919 saw Japan's representative Saionji Kinmochi sitting alongside the "Big Four" (Lloyd George, Wilson, Clemenceau, Orlando) leaders at the Paris Peace Conference. Tokyo gained a permanent seat on the Council of the League of Nations, and the Paris Peace Conference confirmed the transfer to Japan of Germany's rights in Shandong. Similarly, Germany's more northerly Pacific islands came under a Japanese mandate, called the South Seas Mandate. During the conference, the Japanese delegation proposed that a "racial equality clause" be attached to the Covenant of the League of Nations, similar to the covenant's religious equality clause; however, this proposal was ultimately unsuccessful despite a majority of delegations voting for it. This rejection of the proposal has been seen by some historians as an event that contributed to Japan turning away from the Western world in the years after World War I. Japan, by now a great power, continued to expand its influence after the war.

== Aftermath ==
The prosperity brought on by World War I did not last. Although Japan's light industry had secured a share of the world market, Japan returned to debtor-nation status soon after the end of the war. The ease of Japan's victory, the negative impact of the Shōwa recession in 1926, and internal political instabilities helped contribute to the rise of Japanese militarism in the late 1920s to 1930s.

== See also ==
- Asian and Pacific theatre of World War I
- Diplomatic history of the First World War
