= Eitaro Mabuchi =

Japanese politician

- 馬淵 鋭太郎
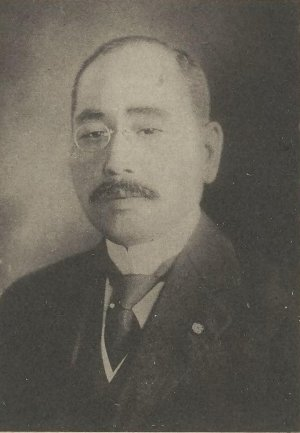

Mayor of Kyoto
- In office 22 July 1921 – 19 September 1924
- Preceded by: Andō Kensuke
- Succeeded by: Konosuke Yasuda
Gubernatorial offices
Governor of Kyoto Prefecture
In office May 1918 – July 1921
Monarch	Taishō
Preceded by	Kiuchi Jūshirō
Succeeded by	Raizo Wakabayashi
Governor of Hiroshima Prefecture
In office 28 April 1916 – 7 May 1918
Monarch	Taishō
Preceded by	Terada Yushi
Succeeded by	Yasukouchi Asakichi
Governor of Mie Prefecture
In office 28 April 1914 – 28 April 1916
Monarch	Taishō
Preceded by	Magoichi Tawara
Succeeded by	Hidejirō Nagata
Governor of Yamaguchi Prefecture
In office 29 June 1912 – 28 April 1914
Monarchs	Meiji; Taishō
Preceded by	Watanabe Yuzuru
Succeeded by	Tenta Akaboshi
Governor of Yamagata Prefecture
In office 27 July 1906 – 29 June 1912
Monarch	Meiji
Preceded by	Tanaka Takamichi
Succeeded by	Otagiri Iwatarō

Personal details
- Born: 22 February 1867 Kanō, Mino, Japan
- Died: 13 September 1943 (aged 76)
- Education: Tokyo Imperial University

Eitaro Mabuchi (馬淵 鋭太郎, Mabuchi Eitarō; 22 February 1867 – 13 September 1943) was a Japanese politician who served as governor of Yamagata Prefecture (1906–1912), Yamaguchi Prefecture (1914–1916), Mie Prefecture (1914–1916), Hiroshima Prefecture from April 1916 to May 1918, Kyoto Prefecture (1918–1921) and mayor of Kyoto (1921–1924).

Mabuchi was the son of a samurai, Munetada Mabuchi of Gifu Prefecture. He graduated from the law college of Tokyo Imperial University in 1893.

Preceded by Tanaka Takamichi	Governor of Yamagata Prefecture; 1906-1912	Succeeded by Iwataro Odakiri
Preceded by	Governor of Yamaguchi Prefecture; 1912-1914	Succeeded by
Preceded by Magoichi Tahara	Governor of Mie Prefecture; 1914-1916	Succeeded by Shujiro Nagata
Preceded by Terada Yushi	Governor of Hiroshima Prefecture; 1916–1918	Succeeded by Yasukouchi Asakichi
Preceded by Kiuchi Jūshirō	Governor of Kyoto Prefecture; 1918-1921	Succeeded by Raizo Wakabayashi
