= Raizo Wakabayashi =

Japanese politician

- 若林 賚蔵
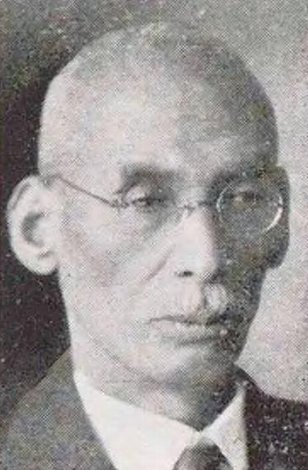

Member of the House of Peers
- In office 19 December 1922 – 27 November 1941 Nominated by the Emperor
Gubernatorial offices
Governor of Kyoto Prefecture
In office July 1921 – October 1922
Monarch	Taishō
Preceded by	Eitaro Mabuchi
Succeeded by	Tokikazu Ikematsu
Governor of Hiroshima Prefecture
In office 18 April 1919 – 19 July 1921
Monarch	Taishō
Preceded by	Yasukouchi Asakichi
Succeeded by	Ichiro Yoda
Governor of Ehime Prefecture
In office 29 January 1917 – 18 April 1919
Monarch	Taishō
Preceded by	Mikita Sakata
Succeeded by	Toshio Mawatari
Governor of Kagawa Prefecture
In office 8 January 1915 – 29 January 1917
Monarch	Taishō
Preceded by	Kawamura Takeji
Succeeded by	Mikita Sakata
Governor of Saga Prefecture
In office 9 June 1914 – 8 January 1915
Monarch	Taishō
Preceded by	Hikomaro Fuwa
Succeeded by	Yawara Ishibashi
Governor of Yamanashi Prefecture
In office 1 June 1913 – 9 June 1914
Monarch	Taishō
Preceded by	Kiichirō Kumagai
Succeeded by	Keiichirō Soeda
Governor of Nara Prefecture
In office 14 June 1909 – 1 June 1913
Monarchs	Meiji; Taishō
Preceded by	Aoki Yoshio
Succeeded by	Miichiro Orihara
Governor of Shimane Prefecture
In office 28 March 1908 – 27 August 1908
Monarch	Meiji
Preceded by	Matsunaga Takekichi
Succeeded by	Maruyama Shigetoshi

Personal details
- Born: 14 January 1866 Iwafune, Echigo, Japan
- Died: 27 November 1941 (aged 75)
- Education: Tokyo Imperial University

Raizo Wakabayashi (若林 賚蔵, Wakabayashi Raizō; 14 January 1866 – 27 November 1941) was a Japanese politician who served as governor of Shimane Prefecture (1908), Nara Prefecture (1909-1913), Yamanashi Prefecture (1913–1914), Saga Prefecture (1914–1915), Kagawa Prefecture (1915–1917), Ehime Prefecture (1917–1919), Hiroshima Prefecture from April 1919 to July 1921 and Kyoto Prefecture (1921–1922).

In 1922, he became a member of the House of Peers.
