= List of governors of Saga Prefecture =

This is a list of governors of Saga Prefecture.

- Sadao Koga 1871–1872
- Viscount Tesshu Yamaoka 1872
- Taku Shigeru 1872–1873
- Ishii Kuni 1873
- Michitoshi Iwamura 1873–1874
- Takatoshi Iwamura 1874
- Hidotemo Kitashima 1874–1876
- Kamata 1883–1888
- Ishii Kuni (2nd time) 1888–1889
- Sukeo Kabayama 1889–1892
- Takaya Nagamine 1892–1894
- Teru Tanabe 1894–1896
- Tsunamasa Ōyama 1896–1897
- Takeuchi 1897–1898
- Yasuhiko Hirayama 1898
- Takeuchi (2nd time) 1898
- Kiyohide Seki 1898–1901
- Fai Kagawa 1901–1908
- Inoue Takashihara 1908
- Nishimura Mutsu 1908–1911
- Fuwa 1911–1914
- Raizo Wakabayashi 1914–1915
- Ishibashi 1915–1917
- Okada 1917
- Muneyoshi Oshiba 1917–1919
- Sawada Ushimaro 1919–1921
- Tominaga 1921–1924
- Saito 1924–1926
- Nagaura 1926–1927
- Ichiro Oshima 1927–1928
- Yujiro Shinjo 1928–1929
- Tetsuzo Yoshimura 1929
- Imajuku Tsugio 1929–1930
- Inoue 1930–1931
- Nakarai Kiyoshi 1931
- Saburo Hayakawa 1931–1933
- Nagawa Fujioka 1933–1934
- Shizuo Furukawa 1934–1937
- Tomoichi Koyama 1937–1939
- Kato 1939–1940
- Masaki 1940–1941
- Yue Yue 1941–1942
- Shogo Tanaka 1942–1944
- Miyazaki Kenta 1944–1945
- Genichi Okimori 1945–1946
- Morio Tozawa 1946–1947
- Kuniharu Jinshan 1947
- Genichi Okimori (2nd time) 1947-1951
- Naotsugu Nebishima 1951-1959
- Sunao Ikeda 1959-1979
- Kumao Katsuki 1979-1991
- Isamu Imoto 1991-2003
- Yasushi Furukawa 2003-2014
- Yoshinori Yamaguchi 2015–present
