= 1990 in Japan =

- Decades: 1970s; 1980s; 1990s; 2000s; 2010s
- See also: Other events of 1990; History of Japan • Timeline • Years

Events in the year 1990 in Japan. It corresponds to Heisei 2 (平成2年) in the Japanese calendar.

1990 was the last year of the Japanese asset price bubble.

== Incumbents ==
- Emperor: Akihito
- Prime Minister: Toshiki Kaifu (L–Aichi)
- Chief Cabinet Secretary: Mayumi Moriyama (Councillor, L–Tochigi) until February 28, Misoji Sakamoto (L–Ishikawa)
- Chief Justice of the Supreme Court: Kōichi Yaguchi until February 19, Ryōhachi Kusaba from February 20
- President of the House of Representatives: Hajime Tamura (L–Mie) until January 24, Yoshio Sakurauchi (L–Shimane) from February 27
- President of the House of Councillors: Yoshihiko Tsuchiya (L–Saitama)
- Diet sessions: 117th (regular session opened in December 1989, to January 24), 118th (special, February 27 to June 26), 119th (extraordinary, October 12 to November 10), 120th (regular, December 10 to 1991, May 8)

=== Governors ===
- Aichi Prefecture: Reiji Suzuki
- Akita Prefecture: Kikuji Sasaki
- Aomori Prefecture: Masaya Kitamura
- Chiba Prefecture: Takeshi Numata
- Ehime Prefecture: Sadayuki Iga
- Fukui Prefecture: Yukio Kurita
- Fukuoka Prefecture: Hachiji Okuda
- Fukushima Prefecture: Eisaku Satō
- Gifu Prefecture: Taku Kajiwara
- Gunma Prefecture: Ichiro Shimizu
- Hiroshima Prefecture: Toranosuke Takeshita
- Hokkaido: Takahiro Yokomichi
- Hyogo Prefecture: Toshitami Kaihara
- Ibaraki Prefecture: Fujio Takeuchi
- Ishikawa Prefecture: Yōichi Nakanishi
- Iwate Prefecture: Tadashi Nakamura
- Kagawa Prefecture: Jōichi Hirai
- Kagoshima Prefecture: Yoshiteru Tsuchiya
- Kanagawa Prefecture: Kazuji Nagasu
- Kochi Prefecture: Chikara Nakauchi
- Kumamoto Prefecture: Morihiro Hosokawa
- Kyoto Prefecture: Teiichi Aramaki
- Mie Prefecture: Ryōzō Tagawa
- Miyagi Prefecture: Shuntarō Honma
- Miyazaki Prefecture: Suketaka Matsukata
- Nagano Prefecture: Gorō Yoshimura
- Nagasaki Prefecture: Isamu Takada
- Nara Prefecture: Shigekiyo Ueda
- Niigata Prefecture: Kiyoshi Kaneko
- Oita Prefecture: Morihiko Hiramatsu
- Okayama Prefecture: Shiro Nagano
- Okinawa Prefecture: Junji Nishime (until 9 December); Masahide Ōta (starting 10 December)
- Osaka Prefecture: Sakae Kishi
- Saga Prefecture: Kumao Katsuki
- Saitama Prefecture: Yawara Hata
- Shiga Prefecture: Minoru Inaba
- Shiname Prefecture: Nobuyoshi Sumita
- Shizuoka Prefecture: Shigeyoshi Saitō
- Tochigi Prefecture: Fumio Watanabe
- Tokushima Prefecture: Shinzo Miki
- Tokyo: Shun'ichi Suzuki
- Tottori Prefecture: Yuji Nishio
- Toyama Prefecture: Yutaka Nakaoki
- Wakayama Prefecture: Shirō Kariya
- Yamagata Prefecture: Seiichirō Itagaki
- Yamaguchi Prefecture: Toru Hirai
- Yamanashi Prefecture: Kōmei Mochizuki

== Events ==
- February 18: Elections for the House of Representatives.
- February 28: Second Kaifu cabinet formed.
- March 10: Keiyo Line opens between Tokyo and Chiba.
- March 18: A supermarket store fire in Amagasaki, Hyogo Prefecture, according to official confirmed report; 15 fatalities, with 6 people injured.
- April 1: International Flower Exposition opens in Osaka.
- June 29: Fumihito, Prince Akishino, second son of Emperor Akihito, weds Kiko Kawashima.
- July 2: A heavy torrential rain and landslide hit in Aso-Kujyu area, part of Oita Prefecture and Kumamoto Prefecture, according to Fire and Disaster Management agency official confirmed report, 32 person fatalities with 109 person injures.
- August 13: Orix Braves baseball team announces that it will move to Kobe and become the Orix BlueWave.
- September 19 – 20: According to Fire and Disaster Management Agency official confirmed report, Typhoon Flo, hit powerful strong wind, flash flood, tornado hit in around Honshu, total 44 person were death, 197 person were hurt.
- September 27: A MBB/Kawasaki BK 117 helicopter crash into mountain in Hyuga, Miyazaki Prefecture, according to Japan Transport Safety Board official confirmed report, 10 persons were lost to lives.
- October 21: Ayrton Senna wins his second drivers' title at Suzuka following a controversial collision with Alain Prost at the start of the race. McLaren-Honda win the Constructors' title.
- November 12: Akihito is enthroned as Emperor of Japan.
- November 21: Nintendo releases its successor to the Family Computer and third home video game console, the Super Famicom. The console launched with F-Zero and Super Mario World.
- December 2: Toyohiro Akiyama becomes the first Japanese person in space, being launched as a crew member onboard Soyuz TM-11.
- December 29: Kaifu cabinet reshuffled.

== Births ==
- January 24
  - Mao Abe, singer-songwriter
  - Ryosuke Irie, swimmer
- January 28: Ichiko Aoba, singer-songwriter
- January 31: Kota Yabu singer and actor
- February 4: Haruka Tomatsu, voice actress
- February 15
  - Masashi Ebinuma, judoka
  - Rina Sumioka, singer-songwriter.
- March 11: Ryosuke Kikuchi, professional baseball player
- March 17: Tamamori Yuta, actor and singer
- March 24: Izumi Kato, swimmer
- March 26: Yuya Takaki, actor and singer
- April 5: Haruma Miura, actor and singer (d. 2020)
- April 12: Hiroki Sakai, footballer
- April 16: Risa Honma, idol
- May 22: An Byong-jun, North Korean, footballer
- June 1: Rie Murakawa, voice actress and singer
- June 15: Miwa, singer
- June 22: Kei Inoo, singer and actor
- June 29: Sayuri Sugawara, singer
- July 3: Nana Iwasaka, volleyball player
- July 11: Risa Shinnabe, volleyball player
- July 21: Sayuri Iwata, model
- August 3: Chiemi Blouson, comedian
- August 6: Natsuko Aso, actress and singer
- August 13: Sae Miyazawa, idol
- September 19: Saki Fukuda, actress
- September 23: Yōhei Kagitani, professional baseball pitcher
- September 25: Mao Asada, figure skater
- September 27: Atsumi Tanezaki, voice actress
- October 4: Saki, guitarist and songwriter
- October 9: Takahiro Shiraishi, seria killer (d. 2025)
- November 12: Hideto Asamura, professional baseball player
- November 15
  - Kanata Hongō, actor and model
  - Erika Yazawa, gravure idol
- November 28: Hayato Katsuki, race walker
- December 2: Hikaru Yaotome, singer and songwriter
- December 10: Shoya Tomizawa, motorcycle rider (d. 2010)
- December 20: Minami Takahashi, voice actress
- December 22: Chika Anzai, voice actress
- December 23: Yu Horiuchi, wrestler

== Deaths ==
- January 20: Prince Naruhiko Higashikuni, prime minister of Japan (b. 1887)
- April 13: Norio Kijima, announcer and politician (b. 1925)
- June 13: Michiyo Kogure, film actress (b. 1918)
- June 15: Nobuo Arai, swimmer (b. 1909)
- July 23: Kenjiro Takayanagi, television engineer, creator of the world's first all-electronic television receiver (b. 1899)
- September 1: Edwin O. Reischauer, former U.S. ambassador (b. 1910)
- September 25: Togyu Okumura, modern painter (b. 1889)
- November 5: Shunkichi Kikuchi, photographer (b. 1916)
- December 4: Naoto Tajima, athlete (b. 1912)
- December 28: Seiji Hisamatsu, film director (b. 1912)

== Statistics ==
- Yen value: US$1 = ¥129 (low) to ¥159 (high)

== See also ==
- 1990 in Japanese television
- List of Japanese films of 1990
- 1990 in Japanese music
