= 1987 in Japan =

- Decades: 1960s; 1970s; 1980s; 1990s; 2000s
- See also: Other events of 1987; History of Japan • Timeline • Years

Events in the year 1987 in Japan.

1987 was the second year of the Japanese asset price bubble: land values in Tokyo rose more than 85 percent between July 1986 and July 1987.

== Incumbents ==
- Emperor: Hirohito
- Prime Minister: Yasuhiro Nakasone (L–Gunma) until November 6, Noboru Takeshita (L–Shimane)
- Chief Cabinet Secretary: Masaharu Gotōda (L–Tokushima) until November 6, Keizō Obuchi (L–Gunma)
- Chief Justice of the Supreme Court: Kōichi Yaguchi
- President of the House of Representatives: Kenzaburō Hara (L–Hyōgo)
- President of the House of Councillors: Masaaki Fujita (L–Hiroshima)
- Diet sessions: 108th (regular session opened in December 1986, to May 27), 109th (extraordinary, July 6 to September 19), 110th (extraordinary, November 6 to November 11), 111th (extraordinary, November 27 to December 12), 112th (regular, December 28 to 1988, May 25)

=== Governors ===
- Aichi Prefecture: Reiji Suzuki
- Akita Prefecture: Kikuji Sasaki
- Aomori Prefecture: Masaya Kitamura
- Chiba Prefecture: Takeshi Numata
- Ehime Prefecture: Haruki Shiraishi (until 27 January); Sadayuki Iga (starting 28 January)
- Fukui Prefecture: Heidayū Nakagawa (until 23 April); Yukio Kurita (starting 23 April)
- Fukuoka Prefecture: Hachiji Okuda
- Fukushima Prefecture: Isao Matsudaira
- Gifu Prefecture: Yosuke Uematsu
- Gunma Prefecture: Ichiro Shimizu
- Hiroshima Prefecture: Toranosuke Takeshita
- Hokkaido: Takahiro Yokomichi
- Hyogo Prefecture: Toshitami Kaihara
- Ibaraki Prefecture: Fujio Takeuchi
- Ishikawa Prefecture: Yōichi Nakanishi
- Iwate Prefecture: Tadashi Nakamura
- Kagawa Prefecture: Jōichi Hirai
- Kagoshima Prefecture: Kaname Kamada
- Kanagawa Prefecture: Kazuji Nagasu
- Kochi Prefecture: Chikara Nakauchi
- Kumamoto Prefecture: Morihiro Hosokawa
- Kyoto Prefecture: Teiichi Aramaki
- Mie Prefecture: Ryōzō Tagawa
- Miyagi Prefecture: Sōichirō Yamamoto
- Miyazaki Prefecture: Suketaka Matsukata
- Nagano Prefecture: Gorō Yoshimura
- Nagasaki Prefecture: Isamu Takada
- Nara Prefecture: Shigekiyo Ueda
- Niigata Prefecture: Takeo Kimi
- Oita Prefecture: Morihiko Hiramatsu
- Okayama Prefecture: Shiro Nagano
- Okinawa Prefecture: Junji Nishime
- Osaka Prefecture: Sakae Kishi
- Saga Prefecture: Kumao Katsuki
- Saitama Prefecture: Yawara Hata
- Shiga Prefecture: Minoru Inaba
- Shiname Prefecture: Seiji Tsunematsu (until 29 April); Nobuyoshi Sumita (starting 30 April)
- Shizuoka Prefecture: Shigeyoshi Saitō
- Tochigi Prefecture: Fumio Watanabe
- Tokushima Prefecture: Shinzo Miki
- Tokyo: Shun'ichi Suzuki
- Tottori Prefecture: Yuji Nishio
- Toyama Prefecture: Yutaka Nakaoki
- Wakayama Prefecture: Shirō Kariya
- Yamagata Prefecture: Seiichirō Itagaki
- Yamaguchi Prefecture: Toru Hirai
- Yamanashi Prefecture: Kōmei Mochizuki

== Events ==
- January 27: Construction began on Kansai International Airport.
- February 9: First public float of NTT.
- March 17: Asahi beer starts selling Asahi Super Dry.
- April 1: Japanese National Railways is privatized and becomes the seven Japan Railways Group companies.
- April 4: The Ariake Coliseum in Koto Ward, Tokyo, is completed.
- June 1: Asahi TV starts broadcasting the popular short factual television programme See the World by Train (世界の車窓から)
- June 6: A Shojuen elderly nursing home fire in Higashimurayama, Tokyo. according to Japanese Fire and Disaster Management agency confirmed report, 17 person lost to lives.
- July 12: Metal Gear is released by Konami.
- July 23: 1987 Tokyo Metropolitan area power outage, where 2.8 million household affected, which restore spent more three and half hours, according to Japanese government confirmed report.
- October 1: Nippon Gakki Company Ltd. (Japan Musical Instrument Manufacturing Corporation) is renamed to Yamaha Corporation and Konishiroku Honten is renamed to Konica (Konica Minolta).
- October 12: Susumu Tonegawa wins the Nobel Prize for Physiology or Medicine.
- October 30: NEC releases the PC Engine home video game console.
- November 6: Noboru Takeshita becomes prime minister.
- December 15: Production I.G is founded by Mitsuhisa Ishikawa and Takayuki Goto.
- December 17: Rockman is released for the Family Computer.

During 1987:

- NTT began the first mobile phone service in Japan.
- Shoko Asahara founded Aum Shinrikyo.
- Teikyo University of Technology and Science founded in Chiba City, as predecessor of Teikyo Heisei University.

== Births ==
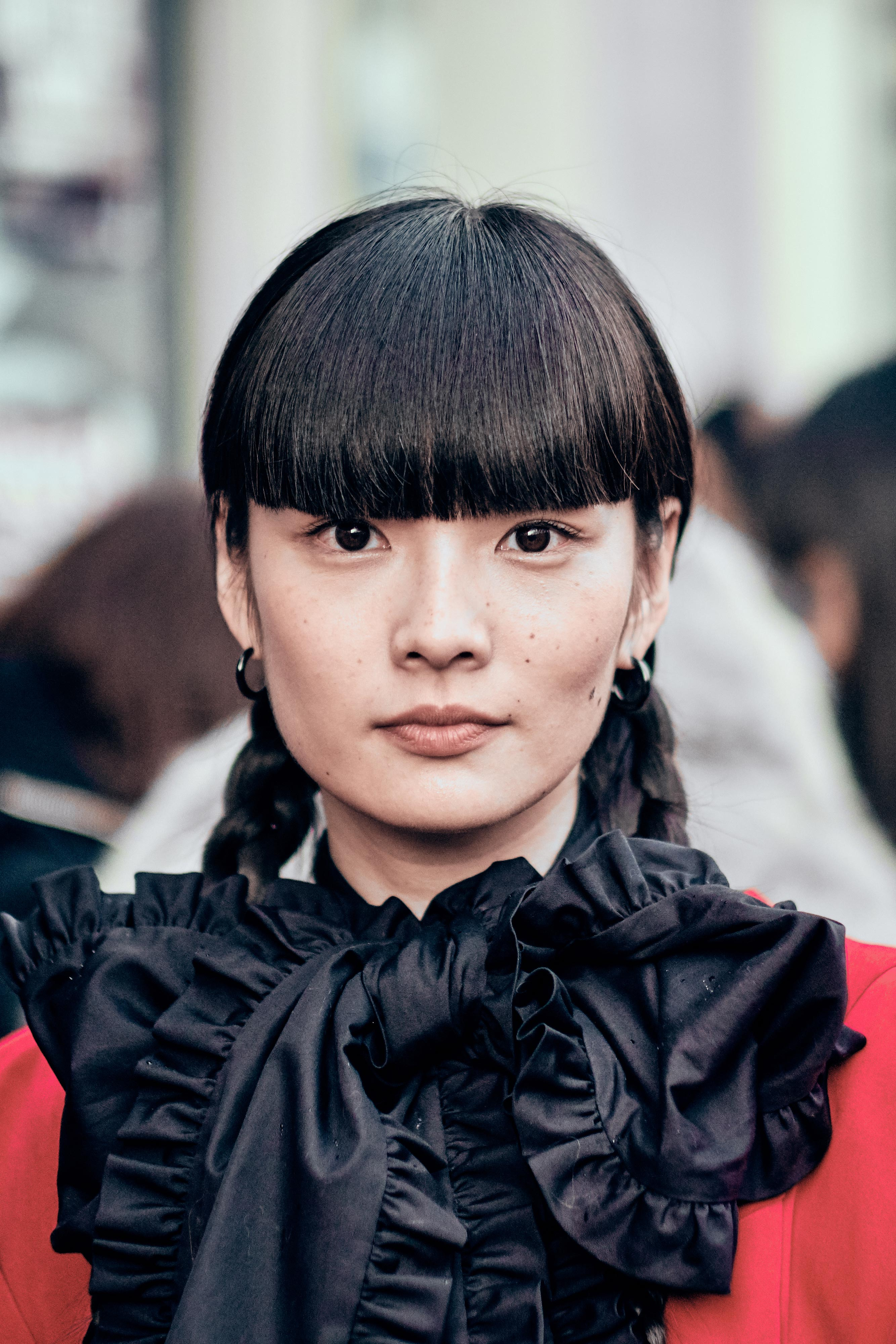
Kozue Akimoto

- January 3: Nana Yanagisawa, actress and fashion model
- January 8: Saori Gotō, voice actress
- January 23: Yuto Nakamura, football player
- February 12: Asami Tano, Japanese voice actress
- February 15: Azumi Yamamoto, voice actress
- March 12: Hiroomi Tosaka, Singer
- March 15: Momoko Shibuya, actress
- March 24: Yuma Asami, adult video actress
- March 25: Nobunari Oda, figure skater
- March 26: YUI, singer-songwriter
- April 17: Nami Sano, manga artist (died 2023)
- April 27: Anne Suzuki, actress
- May 2
  - Miyu Uehara, gravure idol and television personality (died 2011)
  - Nana Kitade, singer
- May 7: Asami Konno, J-pop singer
- May 20: Taku Takeuchi, ski jumper
- May 22
  - Takuya Eguchi, voice actor
  - Tao Okamoto, model
- June 3: Masami Nagasawa, actress
- June 17: Nozomi Tsuji, performer
- June 19: Miho Fukuhara, singer
- June 25: Takahiro Itō, actor and voice actor (died 2009)
- July 3: Mikie Hara, gravure idol and actress
- July 11
  - Shigeaki Kato, singer
  - Shun Yamaguchi, professional baseball player
- July 17: Mio Nishimaki, wrestler
- July 27: Kozue Akimoto, model
- July 28: Sumire, model (died 2009)
- August 16: Eri Kitamura, voice actress and singer
- August 24: Daichi Miura, singer and dancer
- September 11: Kaori Matsumoto, judoka
- September 21: Elly, Dancer and Rapper
- September 28: Sho Uchida, freestyle swimmer
- October 1: Hiroki Aiba, actor, dancer, and singer
- October 3: Asami Kitagawa, swimmer
- October 4: Atomu Tanaka, football player
- October 8: Aya Hirano, voice actress and singer
- October 15: Mizuho Sakaguchi, footballer
- October 23: Miyuu Sawai, model, actress, and idol
- October 23: Naomi Watanabe, actress and comedian
- October 27: Thelma Aoyama, J-Pop and R&B singer
- October 29: Makoto Ogawa, pop singer
- November 11: Yuya Tegoshi, singer
- November 12: Kengo Kora, actor
- November 27: Yuria Haga, model and actress
- December 18
  - Miki Ando, figure skater
  - Ayaka, singer
  - Yuki Furukawa, actor
- December 19: Shuko Aoyama, Japanese tennis player
- December 20
  - Yutaka Otsuka, baseball player
  - Michihiro Yasuda, football player

== Deaths ==
- January 21: Ikki Kajiwara, author, manga writer, and film producer (b. 1936)
- February 3: Prince Takamatsu (b. 1905)
- March 8: Iwao Yamawaki, photographer (b. 1898)
- April 5: Tsuneko Nakazato, novelist (b. 1909)
- April 15: Masatoshi Nakayama, master of Shotokan karate (b. 1913)
- April 21: Haruyasu Nakajima, baseball player (b. 1909)
- May 10: Sadamichi Hirasawa, tempera painter (b. 1892)
- June 6: Mori Mari, author (b. 1903)
- June 16: Kōji Tsuruta, actor (b. 1924)
- July 17: Yujiro Ishihara, actor (b. 1934)
- July 20: Ichirō Arishima, comedian and actor (b. 1916)
- August 5: Tatsuhiko Shibusawa, novelist, art critic, and translator of French literature (b. 1928)
- August 7: Nobusuke Kishi, former prime minister (b. 1896)
- August 10: Prince Yamashina Takehiko (b. 1898)
- August 16: Sumiko Kurishima, actress and master of traditional Japanese dance (b. 1902)
- November 11: Hiroshi Kawaguchi, actor (b. 1936)
- December 29: Jun Ishikawa, author (b. 1899)

== Statistics ==
- Yen value: US$1 = ¥122 (low) to ¥152 (high)

== See also ==
- 1987 in Japanese television
- List of Japanese films of 1987
- 1987 in Japanese music
