= 1986 in Japan =

- Decades: 1960s; 1970s; 1980s; 1990s; 2000s
- See also: Other events of 1986; History of Japan • Timeline • Years

1986 in Japan was the first year of the Japanese asset price bubble.

== Government incumbents ==
- Emperor: Hirohito
- Prime Minister: Yasuhiro Nakasone (L–Gunma)
- Chief Cabinet Secretary: Masaharu Gotōda (L–Tokushima)
- Chief Justice of the Supreme Court: Kōichi Yaguchi
- President of the House of Representatives: Michita Sakata (L–Kumamoto) until June 2, Kenzaburō Hara (L–Hyōgo) from July 22
- President of the House of Councillors: Mutsuo Kimura (L–Okayama) until July 22, Masaaki Fujita (L–Hiroshima)
- Diet sessions: 104th (regular session opened in December 1985, to May 22), 105th (extraordinary, June 2), 106th (special, July 22 to July 25), 107th (extraordinary, September 11 to December 20), 108th (regular, December 29 to 1987, May 27)

=== Governors ===
- Aichi Prefecture: Reiji Suzuki
- Akita Prefecture: Kikuji Sasaki
- Aomori Prefecture: Masaya Kitamura
- Chiba Prefecture: Takeshi Numata
- Ehime Prefecture: Haruki Shiraishi
- Fukui Prefecture: Heidayū Nakagawa
- Fukuoka Prefecture: Hachiji Okuda
- Fukushima Prefecture: Isao Matsudaira
- Gifu Prefecture: Yosuke Uematsu
- Gunma Prefecture: Ichiro Shimizu
- Hiroshima Prefecture: Toranosuke Takeshita
- Hokkaido: Takahiro Yokomichi
- Hyogo Prefecture: Tokitada Sakai (until 23 November); Toshitami Kaihara (starting 24 November)
- Ibaraki Prefecture: Fujio Takeuchi
- Ishikawa Prefecture: Yōichi Nakanishi
- Iwate Prefecture: Tadashi Nakamura
- Kagawa Prefecture: Tadao Maekawa (until 4 September); Jōichi Hirai (starting 5 September)
- Kagoshima Prefecture: Kaname Kamada
- Kanagawa Prefecture: Kazuji Nagasu
- Kochi Prefecture: Chikara Nakauchi
- Kumamoto Prefecture: Morihiro Hosokawa
- Kyoto Prefecture: Yukio Hayashida (until 15 April); Teiichi Aramaki (starting 16 April)
- Mie Prefecture: Ryōzō Tagawa
- Miyagi Prefecture: Sōichirō Yamamoto
- Miyazaki Prefecture: Suketaka Matsukata
- Nagano Prefecture: Gorō Yoshimura
- Nagasaki Prefecture: Isamu Takada
- Nara Prefecture: Shigekiyo Ueda
- Niigata Prefecture: Takeo Kimi
- Oita Prefecture: Morihiko Hiramatsu
- Okayama Prefecture: Shiro Nagano
- Okinawa Prefecture: Junji Nishime
- Osaka Prefecture: Sakae Kishi
- Saga Prefecture: Kumao Katsuki
- Saitama Prefecture: Yawara Hata
- Shiga Prefecture: Masayoshi Takemura (until 16 June); Minoru Inaba (starting 20 July)
- Shiname Prefecture: Seiji Tsunematsu
- Shizuoka Prefecture: Keizaburō Yamamoto (until 6 July); Shigeyoshi Saitō (starting 7 July)
- Tochigi Prefecture: Fumio Watanabe
- Tokushima Prefecture: Shinzo Miki
- Tokyo: Shun'ichi Suzuki
- Tottori Prefecture: Yuji Nishio
- Toyama Prefecture: Yutaka Nakaoki
- Wakayama Prefecture: Shirō Kariya
- Yamagata Prefecture: Seiichirō Itagaki
- Yamaguchi Prefecture: Toru Hirai
- Yamanashi Prefecture: Kōmei Mochizuki

== Events ==
- January 6: Major snowfall strikes Western Japan. Kagoshima was blanketed with 20 cm of snow.
- January 26: An avalanche hit Maseguchi, Mount Gongen, Niigata Prefecture. According to an official report of the Fire and Disaster Management Agency, 13 people died and 9 others were injured.
- February 11: A fire broke out in a hotel in Higashiizu, Shizuoka Prefecture killing 24 people.
- March 23: Recorded snowfall in Tokyo area leads to a train collision on the Seibu Shinjuku Line.
- April: The Japanese Equal Employment Opportunity Law went into effect. This law prohibits gender discrimination with respect to vocational training, fringe benefits, retirement, and dismissal, and urges firms to try to equalise opportunity with regard to recruitment, hiring, job assignments, and promotion.
- May 4–6 1986 G7 Summit held in Tokyo.
- July 6: Simultaneous elections for both houses of the Diet.
- July 22: Third Nakasone cabinet announced.
- August 2: The first Studio Ghibli film, "Laputa: Castle in the Sky", was released.
- August 5: Heavy torrential rain with floods hit the Abukuma River and surrounding area in Fukushima Prefecture. The Japan Fire Department Management Agency confirmed 20 people died and 107 were injured.
- September 6: Takako Doi becomes the president of the Japan Socialist Party. She was the first female party leader in Japanese history.
- November 1: According to Japan National Police Agency official confirmed report, seven religious group member burned bodies and mass suicide occurs on beach in Wakayama City.
- December 9: Beat Takeshi and his troupe were arrested for an attack on the editors of Friday magazine.
- December 28: According to former Japan Transport Ministry official confirmed report, a violent storm hit and damage on not in service train in Amarube Viaduct, Sanin Line, Hyogo Prefecture, total six persons were lost to lives, another six persons were wounded.

== Births ==
- January 1: Shōko Hamada, gravure idol and race queen
- January 5: Teppei Koike, singer and actor
- January 7: Keisuke Funatani, footballer
- January 8: Maria Ozawa, adult video actress
- January 16: Ryutaro Matsumoto, wrestler
- January 17: Yu Hasebe, actress and model
- January 23: Yukie Kawamura, gravure idol, tarento, and actress
- January 26: Matt Heafy, musician
- January 31: Hiroyuki Akimoto, judoka
- February 2: Miwa Asao, beach volleyball player
- February 10: Yui Ichikawa, model/performer
- February 15: Ami Koshimizu, voice actress
- February 19: Reon Kadena, model
- February 20: Rika Usami, karate martial artist
- February 22: Toshihiro Aoyama, footballer
- February 23: Kazuya Kamenashi, singer-songwriter and actor (KAT-TUN and Shūji to Akira)
- February 25: Machiko Tezuka, idol
- February 26: Crystal Kay, singer and actress
- March 1: Ayumu Goromaru, rugby union player
- March 11: Mariko Shinoda, singer, actress, fashion model and idol (AKB48)
- March 13:
  - Chiaki Kyan, gravure idol
  - Kousuke Yonehara, singer and actor (Run&Gun)
- March 15: Megumi Kamionobe, footballer
- March 16: Daisuke Takahashi, figure skater
- April 1:
  - Shunichi Miyamoto, musical artist and voice actor
  - Yurika Nakamura, long-distance runner
- April 2: Kota Fujimoto, footballer
- April 6:
  - Gōeidō Gōtarō, sumo wrestler
  - Ryota Moriwaki, football player
- April 8: Erika Sawajiri, actress, model, and musician
- April 10: Yohei Sakai, football player
- April 13: Takashi Amano, footballer
- April 14:
  - Anne Watanabe, fashion model
  - Takuya Kawamura, professional basketball player
- April 16: Shinji Okazaki, football player
- April 20:
  - Yuji Oe, football player
- April 22: Koji Hashimoto, football player
- April 30:
  - Sachi Tainaka, singer
- May 1: Ryo Nurishi, football player
- May 2: Yusuke Araki, FIFA football referee
- May 12: Masaaki Higashiguchi
- May 27: Takafumi Akahoshi, football player
- May 19: Moa Arimoto, actress and model
- May 25:
  - Takahiro Hōjō, actor and musician
  - Juri Ueno, actress
- May 29: Kunihiro Yamashita, football player
- June 10: Hajime Hosogai, footballer
- June 13:
  - Akihiro Ienaga, footballer
  - Keisuke Honda, football player
- June 15: Momoko Ueda, golfer
- June 18: Shusaku Nishikawa, footballer
- June 28: Suzuko Mimori, actress, voice actress and singer
- July 4: Takahisa Masuda, actor, idol and singer
- July 18: Naoaki Aoyama, footballer
- July 31: Hiroki Kato, football player
- August 11: Kaori Fukuhara, voice actress
- August 16: Yu Darvish, baseball player
- August 22: Keiko Kitagawa, actress
- September 10: Ryuji Kamiyama, vocalist and actor (Run&Gun)
- September 11: Chise Nakamura, actress and gravure idol
- September 12: Yuto Nagatomo, footballer
- September 13: Kamui Kobayashi, racing driver
- September 14: Ai Takahashi, performer
- September 19: Manabu Mima, professional baseball pitcher
- September 22: Sayuri Yahagi, voice actress
- October 1: Sayaka Kanda, actress and singer (d. 2021)
- October 6: Yusuke Nakamura, football player
- October 7: Mako, voice actress
- October 14: Azusa Iwashimizu, footballer
- October 28: Aki Toyosaki, voice actress and singer
- October 29: Tina Yuzuki, AV idol
- November 20: Kōhei Horikoshi, manga artist
- November 26: Kanae Itō, voice actress and singer
- December 11: Manami Wakayama, idol
- December 19: Satoshi Ishii, judoka and mixed martial artist
- December 24:
  - Satomi Ishihara, actress
  - Riyo Mori, Miss Universe 2007
- December 25: Aya Suzaki, voice actress and singer
- December 26: Mew Azama, model and actress
- December 28: Manami Watanabe, J-pop singer

== Deaths ==
- January 24: Masazumi Inada, lieutenant general in the Japanese Imperial Army (b. 1896)
- February 21: Shigechiyo Izumi, supercentenarian (b. 1865? or 1880?)
- February 24: Iwaichi Fujiwara, officer in the Imperial Japanese Navy (b. 1908)
- April 8: Yukiko Okada, idol singer (b. 1967)
- April 21: Matsunobori Shigeo, sumo wrestler (b. 1924)
- May 13: Katsuji Matsumoto, illustrator and shōjo manga artist (b. 1904)
- May 17: Masaji Kitano, medical doctor, microbiologist lieutenant general (b. 1894)
- June 26: Kunio Maekawa, architect (b. 1905)
- June 30: Soichi Ichida, philatelist (b. 1910)
- July 31: Chiune Sugihara, diplomat and 'Japanese Schindler' (b. 1900)
- September 10: Koji Shima, film director and screenwriter (b. 1901)
- September 26: Noboru Terada, freestyle swimmer (b. 1917)
- October 14: Takahiko Yamanouchi, theoretical physicist (b. 1902)
- October 25: Tadao Tannaka, mathematician (b. 1908)
- November 12: Fumiko Enchi, author (b. 1905)
- November 26: Kaku Takagawa, Go player (b. 1915)
- December 25: Hamao Umezawa, scientist (b. 1914)

== Statistics ==
- Yen value: US$1 = ¥153 (low) to ¥192 (high)

== See also ==
- 1986 in Japanese television
- List of Japanese films of 1986
- 1986 in Japanese music
