= 1992 in Japan =

- Decades: 1970s; 1980s; 1990s; 2000s; 2010s
- See also: Other events of 1992; History of Japan • Timeline • Years

Events in the year 1992 in Japan. It corresponds to Heisei 4 (平成4年) in the Japanese calendar.

== Incumbents ==
- Emperor: Akihito
- Prime Minister: Kiichi Miyazawa (L–Hiroshima)
- Chief Cabinet Secretary: Kōichi Katō (L–Yamagata) until December 12, Yōhei Kōno (L–Kanagawa)
- Chief Justice of the Supreme Court: Ryōhachi Kusaba
- President of the House of Representatives: Yoshio Sakurauchi (L–Shimane)
- President of the House of Councillors: Yūji Osada (L–proportional) until July 9, Bunbē Hara (L–Tokyo) from August 7
- Diet sessions: 123rd (regular, January 24 to June 21), 124th (extraordinary, August 7 to August 11), 125th (extraordinary, October 30 to December 10)

=== Governors ===
- Aichi Prefecture: Reiji Suzuki
- Akita Prefecture: Kikuji Sasaki
- Aomori Prefecture: Masaya Kitamura
- Chiba Prefecture: Takeshi Numata
- Ehime Prefecture: Sadayuki Iga
- Fukui Prefecture: Yukio Kurita
- Fukuoka Prefecture: Hachiji Okuda
- Fukushima Prefecture: Eisaku Satō
- Gifu Prefecture: Taku Kajiwara
- Gunma Prefecture: Hiroyuki Kodera
- Hiroshima Prefecture: Toranosuke Takeshita
- Hokkaido: Takahiro Yokomichi
- Hyogo Prefecture: Toshitami Kaihara
- Ibaraki Prefecture: Fujio Takeuchi
- Ishikawa Prefecture: Yōichi Nakanishi
- Iwate Prefecture: Iwao Kudō
- Kagawa Prefecture: Jōichi Hirai
- Kagoshima Prefecture: Yoshiteru Tsuchiya
- Kanagawa Prefecture: Kazuji Nagasu
- Kochi Prefecture: Daijiro Hashimoto
- Kumamoto Prefecture: Joji Fukushima
- Kyoto Prefecture: Teiichi Aramaki
- Mie Prefecture: Ryōzō Tagawa
- Miyagi Prefecture: Shuntarō Honma
- Miyazaki Prefecture: Suketaka Matsukata
- Nagano Prefecture: Gorō Yoshimura
- Nagasaki Prefecture: Isamu Takada
- Nara Prefecture: Yoshiya Kakimoto
- Niigata Prefecture: Kiyoshi Kaneko (until 9 September); Ikuo Hirayama (starting 25 October)
- Oita Prefecture: Morihiko Hiramatsu
- Okayama Prefecture: Shiro Nagano
- Okinawa Prefecture: Masahide Ōta
- Osaka Prefecture: Kazuo Nakagawa
- Saga Prefecture: Isamu Imoto
- Saitama Prefecture: Yawara Hata (until 12 July); Yoshihiko Tsuchiya (starting 12 July)
- Shiga Prefecture: Minoru Inaba
- Shiname Prefecture: Nobuyoshi Sumita
- Shizuoka Prefecture: Shigeyoshi Saitō
- Tochigi Prefecture: Fumio Watanabe
- Tokushima Prefecture: Shinzo Miki
- Tokyo: Shun'ichi Suzuki
- Tottori Prefecture: Yuji Nishio
- Toyama Prefecture: Yutaka Nakaoki
- Wakayama Prefecture: Shirō Kariya
- Yamagata Prefecture: Seiichirō Itagaki
- Yamaguchi Prefecture: Toru Hirai
- Yamanashi Prefecture: Ken Amano

== Events ==
- January 8: US President George H. W. Bush vomits in Prime Minister Miyazawa's lap during a state dinner.
- January 12: According to Japan Coast Guard official confirmed report, a settlement ship Fukujin-maru, carrying 46 passengers and crew, capsizes off Shimonoseki, Yamaguchi Prefecture, 37 persons were rescued, 9 persons were their lost to lives.
- January 13: Japan apologizes for forcing Korean women into sexual slavery during World War II.
- March 7: Sailor Moon began broadcasting on TV Asahi.
- March 14: Nozomi services begin on the Tokaido Shinkansen.
- March 25: Huis ten Bosch opens in Nagasaki Prefecture.
- April 1
  - Chiba City is divided into wards.
  - Taiyo Kobe Mitsui Bank renames itself to Sakura Bank.
- April 27: Kirby's Dream Land, the first video game in the Kirby series by Nintendo and HAL Laboratory and the debut of Kirby himself, is released.
- May 2: Civil servants are granted a two-day weekend for the first time.
- May 22: Japan New Party founded.
- July 1: Yamagata Shinkansen opens.
- July 26: In Upper House elections, the LDP holds on to a slim coalition majority.
- August 27: Super Mario Kart, the first video game in the Mario Kart series by Nintendo, is released.
- October 14: Liberal Democratic Party member Shin Kanemaru resigns over the receipt of illegal payments from Sagawa Express.
- October 23: Emperor Akihito visits the People's Republic of China for the first time.
- October 29–November 8: Finals of the 1992 AFC Asian Cup held in Japan. The Japan national football team defeat the defending champions, Saudi Arabia, in the final in Hiroshima.

== Births ==
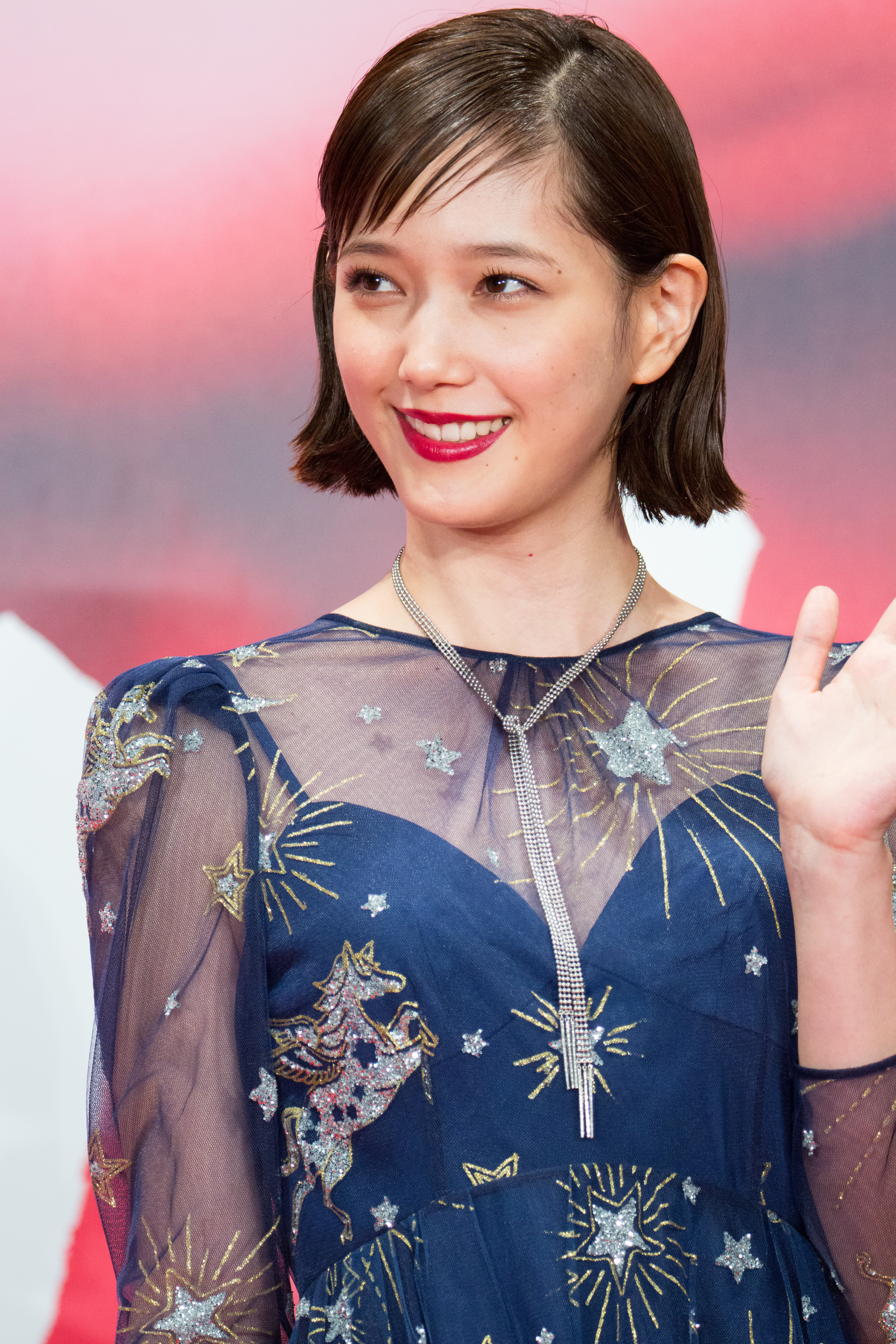
Tsubasa Honda

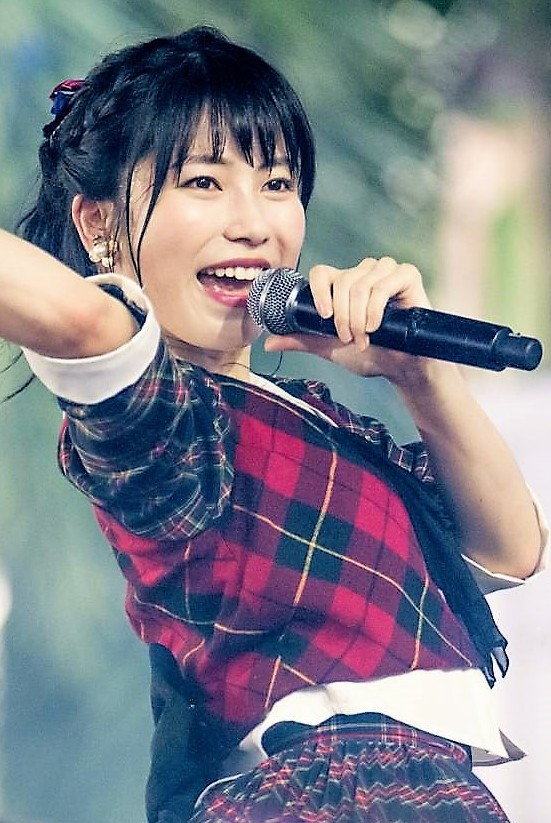
Yui Yokoyama

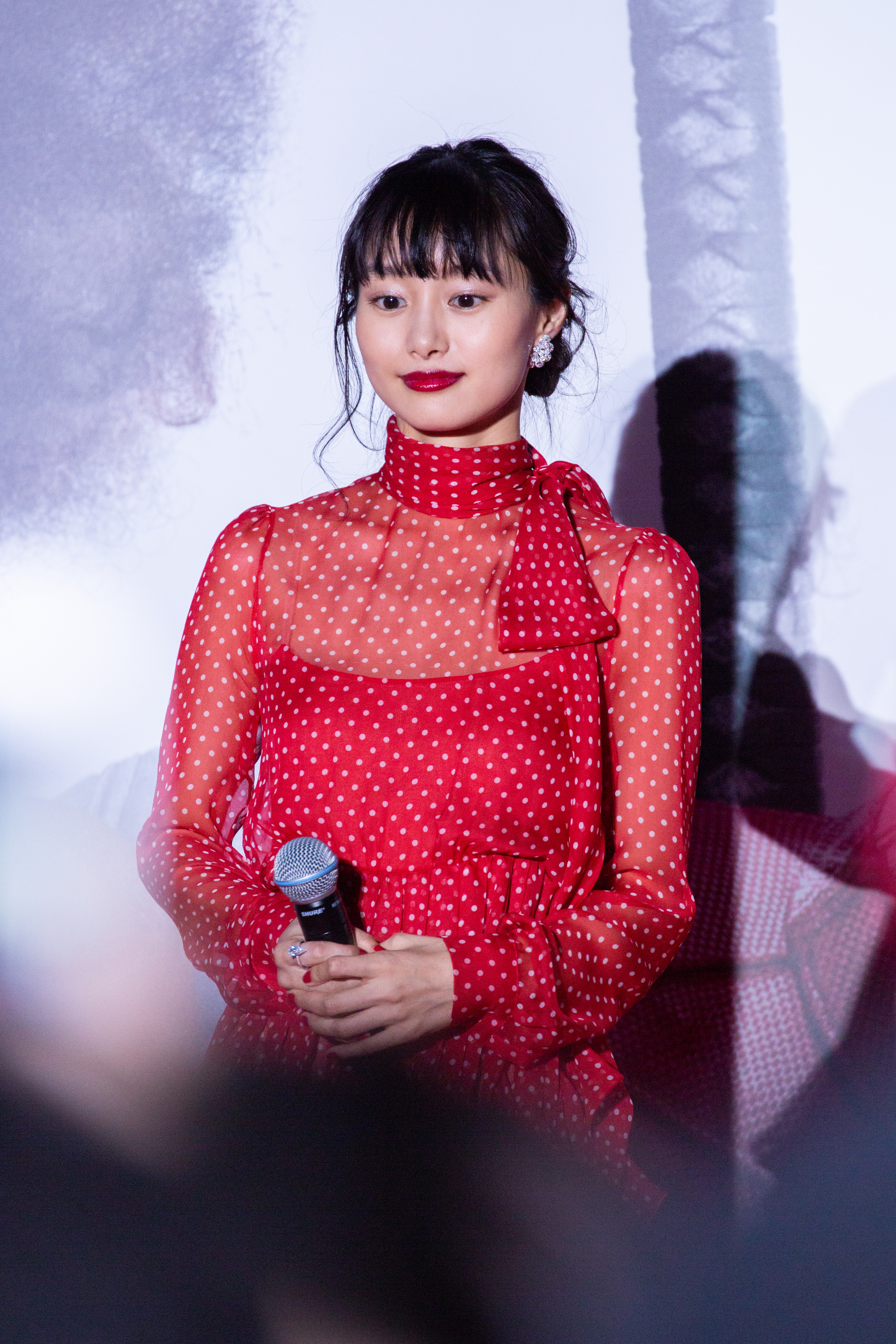
Shiori Kutsuna

- January 6: Hiroya, kickboxer
- January 12: Mao Kobayashi, idol
- February 1: Mao Ichimichi, actress
- February 7: Maimi Yajima, singer
- February 26: Ai Shinozaki, gravure idol and singer
- March 6: Momoko Tsugunaga, singer
- March 11: Nao Tōyama, voice actress and singer
- March 21: Erena Mizusawa, model and actress
- March 25: Machico, singer and voice actress
- March 27: Aoi Yūki, voice actress
- April 13: Daichi Hashimoto, professional wrestler
- April 25: Kyosuke Ikeda, actor and voice actor
- May 1: You Kikkawa, singer
- May 22: Chinami Tokunaga, J-pop singer
- May 28: Gaku Shibasaki, footballer
- June 27: Tsubasa Honda, actress and model
- July 3: Maasa Sudo, singer
- July 12: Anna Ishibashi, model and actress
- July 15:
  - Hokutōfuji Daiki, sumo wrestler
  - Koharu Kusumi, J-pop singer, voice actress, and model
- July 16: Tetsuto Yamada, baseball player
- August 5: Yasutaka Uchiyama, tennis player
- August 6: Saori Ōnishi, voice actress
- August 10: Ari Ozawa, voice actress
- August 16: Zawachin, model
- August 18: Riko Narumi, actress and model
- August 20: Mai Shiraishi, idol singer and model
- August 23: Yuka Kono, figure skater
- August 25: Miyabi Natsuyaki, singer
- August 27
  - Ayame Goriki, actress, singer and model
  - Sayuri Matsumura, idol singer, model
- September 3: Sachie Ishizu, tennis player
- September 7: Suzuka Morita, model and actress
- September 28: Koko Tsurumi, artistic gymnast
- October 2: Yasuaki Yamasaki, professional baseball player
- October 3: Aina Hashimoto, singer, actress and voice actress
- October 4: Shun Miyazato, actor and voice actor
- October 5: Hirotaka Chiba, actor and voice actor
- October 19: Shiho, actress and model
- October 27: Taiko Katono, actor and model
- November 5: Takuya Kai, baseball player
- November 15: Minami Minegishi, singer and actress
- November 20: Maiha Ishimura, singer
- November 25: Haru Nomura, golfer
- December 8: Yui Yokoyama, singer and actress
- December 14: Ryo Miyaichi, footballer
- December 20: Shuta Tonosaki, professional baseball player
- December 22: Shiori Kutsuna, actress and idol

== Deaths ==
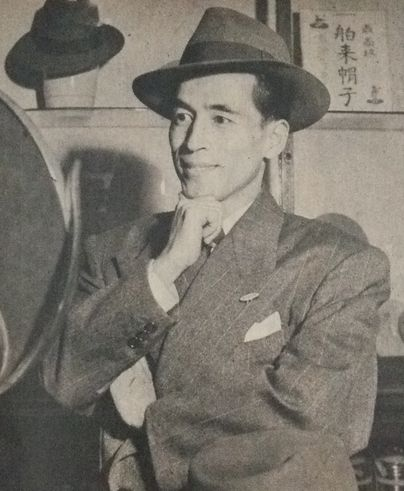
Toshirō Oumi

- April 25: Yutaka Ozaki, songwriter and rock star (b. 1965)
- May 11: Taku Izumi, composer (b. 1930)
- May 22: Lee Yangji, author (b. 1955)
- May 24: Hitoshi Ogawa, racing car driver (b. 1956)
- May 27: Machiko Hasegawa, illustrator (b. 1920)
- May 29: Yoshitoshi Mori, artist (b. 1898)
- June 8: Sakae Ōba, officer of the Imperial Japanese Army (b. 1914)
- June 10: Hachidai Nakamura, composer (b. 1931)
- July 5: Toshirō Oumi, singer, composer (b. 1918)
- August 4: Seicho Matsumoto, author (b. 1909)
- August 12: Kenji Nakagami, author (b. 1946)
- September 5: Yasuji Mori, animator (b. 1925)
- September 25: Kazuko Matsuo, singer (b. 1935)

== Statistics ==
- Yen value: US$1 = ¥111.85 (December 31)

== See also ==
- 1992 in Japanese television
- List of Japanese films of 1992
