= 1991 in Japan =

- Decades: 1970s; 1980s; 1990s; 2000s; 2010s
- See also: Other events of 1991; History of Japan; Timeline; Years

Events in the year 1991 in Japan. It corresponds to Heisei 3 (平成3年) in the Japanese calendar.

== Incumbents ==
- Emperor: Akihito
- Prime Minister: Toshiki Kaifu (L–Aichi) until November 5, Kiichi Miyazawa
- Chief Cabinet Secretary: Misoji Sakamoto (L–Ishikawa) until November 5, Kōichi Katō (L–Yamagata)
- Chief Justice of the Supreme Court: Ryōhachi Kusaba
- President of the House of Representatives: Yoshio Sakurauchi (L–Shimane)
- President of the House of Councillors: Yoshihiko Tsuchiya (L–Saitama) until October 4, Yūji Osada (L–proportional)
- Diet sessions: 120th (regular session opened in December 1990, to May 8), 121st (extraordinary, August 5 to October 4), 122nd (extraordinary, November 5 to December 21)

=== Governors ===
- Aichi Prefecture: Reiji Suzuki
- Akita Prefecture: Kikuji Sasaki
- Aomori Prefecture: Masaya Kitamura
- Chiba Prefecture: Takeshi Numata
- Ehime Prefecture: Sadayuki Iga
- Fukui Prefecture: Yukio Kurita
- Fukuoka Prefecture: Hachiji Okuda
- Fukushima Prefecture: Eisaku Satō
- Gifu Prefecture: Taku Kajiwara
- Gunma Prefecture: Ichiro Shimizu (until 12 June); Hiroyuki Kodera (starting 28 July)
- Hiroshima Prefecture: Toranosuke Takeshita
- Hokkaido: Takahiro Yokomichi
- Hyogo Prefecture: Toshitami Kaihara
- Ibaraki Prefecture: Fujio Takeuchi
- Ishikawa Prefecture: Yōichi Nakanishi
- Iwate Prefecture: Tadashi Nakamura (until 29 April); Iwao Kudō (starting 29 April)
- Kagawa Prefecture: Jōichi Hirai
- Kagoshima Prefecture: Yoshiteru Tsuchiya
- Kanagawa Prefecture: Kazuji Nagasu
- Kochi Prefecture: Chikara Nakauchi (until 6 December); Daijiro Hashimoto (starting 7 December)
- Kumamoto Prefecture: Morihiro Hosokawa (until 10 February); Joji Fukushima (starting 11 February)
- Kyoto Prefecture: Teiichi Aramaki
- Mie Prefecture: Ryōzō Tagawa
- Miyagi Prefecture: Shuntarō Honma
- Miyazaki Prefecture: Suketaka Matsukata
- Nagano Prefecture: Gorō Yoshimura
- Nagasaki Prefecture: Isamu Takada
- Nara Prefecture: Shigekiyo Ueda (until 27 November); Yoshiya Kakimoto (starting 28 November)
- Niigata Prefecture: Kiyoshi Kaneko
- Oita Prefecture: Morihiko Hiramatsu
- Okayama Prefecture: Shiro Nagano
- Okinawa Prefecture: Masahide Ōta
- Osaka Prefecture: Sakae Kishi (until 22 April); Kazuo Nakagawa (starting 23 April)
- Saga Prefecture: Kumao Katsuki (until 22 April); Isamu Imoto (starting 23 April)
- Saitama Prefecture: Yawara Hata
- Shiga Prefecture: Minoru Inaba
- Shiname Prefecture: Nobuyoshi Sumita
- Shizuoka Prefecture: Shigeyoshi Saitō
- Tochigi Prefecture: Fumio Watanabe
- Tokushima Prefecture: Shinzo Miki
- Tokyo: Shun'ichi Suzuki
- Tottori Prefecture: Yuji Nishio
- Toyama Prefecture: Yutaka Nakaoki
- Wakayama Prefecture: Shirō Kariya
- Yamagata Prefecture: Seiichirō Itagaki
- Yamaguchi Prefecture: Toru Hirai
- Yamanashi Prefecture: Kōmei Mochizuki (until 16 February); Ken Amano (starting 17 February)

== Events ==
- January 1: Telephone numbers in Tokyo are expanded from 7 digits to 8 digits
- March 14: A under constructing to Hiroshima Astram Line bridge girder falling accident, kills 14, injures 9.
- April 1: Tokyo Metropolitan Government moved its offices from Marunouchi to the Tokyo Metropolitan Government Building in Shinjuku.
- April 26: Self-Defense Forces dispatched to assist in the Gulf War.
- May 14: Shigaraki train disaster – 42 fatalities, 614 injures in Shiga Prefecture.
- June 3: Mount Unzen in Nagasaki Prefecture saw a pyroclastic flow, resulting in 43 deaths.
- June 15: The International Olympic Committee awards the 1998 Winter Olympics to Nagano, Japan.
- June 20: Tohoku Shinkansen line is extended from Ueno Station to Tokyo Station.
- July 13: 1991 Itoman special breach of trust case, six arrested by Japanese authorities.
- July 31: Lotte Orions baseball team announces it will move to Chiba and become the Chiba Lotte Marines.
- August 5: Aerospatiale SA365N helicopter crash in Muraoka, Mikata District, Hyōgo Prefecture, 8 fatalities.
- August 14 – NTT Docomo was founded.
- September 11: USS Independence (CV-62) arrives at Yokosuka, replacing the USS Midway (CV-41) as the U.S. Navy's only forward-deployed aircraft carrier.
- September 27: Typhoon Mireille kills 45 people in Japan.
- October 3: Kaifu resigns as prime minister.
- October 20: At the Japanese Grand Prix held at the Suzuka Circuit, Ayrton Senna wins his third and last F1 Drivers' Championship.
- November 5: Miyazawa announces his first cabinet.

== Births ==
=== January ===
- January 8: Asuka Hinoi, singer
- January 14: Kana Ichikawa, sprinter
- January 19: Yu Takahashi, model and actress

=== February ===
- February 4: Aya Ōmasa, fashion model and actress

=== March ===
- March 4: Aoi Nakamura, actor
- March 10: Kenshi Yonezu, singer-songwriter
- March 14: Michiko Kashiwabara, cross country skier
- March 14: Miu Nakamura, tarento and gravure idol
- March 15: Kii Kitano, gravure idol and actress
- March 28: Rin Asuka, actress

=== April ===
- April 8: Minami Takahashi, singer
- April 11: Erina Mano, J-pop singer
- April 11: Kenta Matsudaira, table tennis player
- April 12: Daisuke Kikuchi, footballer
- April 15: Daiki Arioka, singer
- April 16: Misato Ugaki, announcer
- April 17: Shinsaku Uesugi, FIDE master
- April 20: Yuko Shintake, artistic gymnast
- April 29: Misaki Doi, tennis player
- May 3: Narita Brian, racehorse (died 1998)

=== May ===
- May 24: Erika Umeda, singer
- May 26: Takumi Abe, football player
- May 29: Saori Hayami, voice actress and singer

=== June ===
- June 15: Rina Takeda, actress and martial artist
- June 17: Yusei Kikuchi, baseball pitcher
- June 25: Kyousuke Hamao, actor and model
- June 27: Haruka Yamazaki, voice actress and singer
- June 30: Kaho, actress

=== July ===
- July 3: Tomomi Itano, singer, actress and idol
- July 10: Atsuko Maeda, singer
- July 11: Kentaro Sakaguchi, model and actor
- July 12: Tomoki Kameda, boxer
- July 15: Yuki Kashiwagi, singer, actress and idol
- July 18: Mizuki Yamamoto, model and actress
- July 25: Miyu Nagaoka, volleyball player
- July 27: Rena Matsui, singer and idol
- July 28: Rina Aizawa, actress

=== August ===
- August 3: Kaori Kawanaka, archer
- August 16: Yūki Tokiwa, voice actor

=== September ===
- September 17: Ryo Ishikawa, golfer

=== October ===
- October 15: Sayaka Nakaya, idol
- October 16: Miori Takimoto, actress
- October 23: Princess Mako
- October 26: Riho Iida, actress and child model
- October 27: Sōta Murakami, actor and voice actor

=== November ===
- November 12: Takatoshi Abe, track and field athlete
- November 16: Tomomi Kasai, singer
- November 19: Genki Yamamoto, cyclist
- November 22: Saki Shimizu, singer
- November 26: Yoshi Tsutsugo, professional baseball player
- November 28: Mayuko Kawakita, actress and model

=== December ===
- December 3: Masahiro Usui, actor
- December 7: Dori Sakurada, actor and singer
- December 14: Mitsuki Takahata, actress and singer
- December 19: Sumire Uesaka, voice actress and singer
- December 24: Shion Kokubun, figure skater
- December 30: Kurumi Nara, tennis player

== Deaths ==
- January 2: Hiroshi Noma, author (b. 1915)
- January 29: Yasushi Inoue, author (b. 1907)
- February 24: Shingo Kanemoto, voice actor (b. 1932)
- May 15: Shintaro Abe, politician (b. 1924)
- May 26: Kisaburo Osawa, aikido teacher (b. 1910)
- June 3: Takeshi Nagata, earth scientist (b. 1913)
- July 5: Nobuo Nakamura, actor (b. 1908)
- July 11: Hitoshi Igarashi, scholar (b. 1947)
- August 5: Soichiro Honda, founder of Honda Motor Company (b. 1906)
- August 8: Mitsuko Yoshikawa, actress (b. 1901)
- September 3: Susumu Ishii, second kaicho (Godfather) of Inagawa-kai (b. 1924)
- October 22: Hachiro Kasuga, enka singer (b. 1924)
- November 12: Keizō Hayashi, civil servant and military general (b. 1907)
- November 14: Yoshikata Yoda, screenwriter (b. 1909)
- November 23: Ken Uehara, film actor (b. 1909)
- November 27: Yō Yoshimura, voice actor (b. 1909)

== Statistics ==
- Yen value: US$1 = ¥124.85 (December 31)

== See also ==
- 1991 in Japanese football
- 1991 in Japanese television
- List of Japanese films of 1991
