= 1985 in Japan =

- Decades: 1960s; 1970s; 1980s; 1990s; 2000s
- See also: Other events of 1985; History of Japan • Timeline • Years

Events in the year 1985 in Japan which correspond to Shōwa 60 (昭和60年) in the Japanese calendar.

== Incumbents ==
- Emperor: Hirohito (Emperor Shōwa)
- Prime Minister: Yasuhiro Nakasone (L–Gunma, 2nd term)
- Chief Cabinet Secretary: Takao Fujinami (L–Mie) until December 28, Masaharu Gotōda (L–Tokushima)
- Chief Justice of the Supreme Court: Jirō Terata until November 3, Kōichi Yaguchi from November 5
- President of the House of Representatives: Kenji Fukunaga (L–Saitama) until January 24, Michita Sakata (L–Kumamoto)
- President of the House of Councillors: Mutsuo Kimura (L–Okayama)
- Diet sessions: 102nd (regular session opened in December 1984, to June 25), 103rd (extraordinary, October 14 to December 21), 104th (regular, December 24 to 1986, May 22)

=== Governors ===
- Aichi Prefecture: Reiji Suzuki
- Akita Prefecture: Kikuji Sasaki
- Aomori Prefecture: Masaya Kitamura
- Chiba Prefecture: Takeshi Numata
- Ehime Prefecture: Haruki Shiraishi
- Fukui Prefecture: Heidayū Nakagawa
- Fukuoka Prefecture: Hachiji Okuda
- Fukushima Prefecture: Isao Matsudaira
- Gifu Prefecture: Yosuke Uematsu
- Gunma Prefecture: Ichiro Shimizu
- Hiroshima Prefecture: Toranosuke Takeshita
- Hokkaido: Takahiro Yokomichi
- Hyogo Prefecture: Tokitada Sakai
- Ibaraki Prefecture: Fujio Takeuchi
- Ishikawa Prefecture: Yōichi Nakanishi
- Iwate Prefecture: Tadashi Nakamura
- Kagawa Prefecture: Tadao Maekawa
- Kagoshima Prefecture: Kaname Kamada
- Kanagawa Prefecture: Kazuji Nagasu
- Kochi Prefecture: Chikara Nakauchi
- Kumamoto Prefecture: Morihiro Hosokawa
- Kyoto Prefecture: Yukio Hayashida
- Mie Prefecture: Ryōzō Tagawa
- Miyagi Prefecture: Sōichirō Yamamoto
- Miyazaki Prefecture: Suketaka Matsukata
- Nagano Prefecture: Gorō Yoshimura
- Nagasaki Prefecture: Isamu Takada
- Nara Prefecture: Shigekiyo Ueda
- Niigata Prefecture: Takeo Kimi
- Oita Prefecture: Morihiko Hiramatsu
- Okayama Prefecture: Shiro Nagano
- Okinawa Prefecture: Junji Nishime
- Osaka Prefecture: Sakae Kishi
- Saga Prefecture: Kumao Katsuki
- Saitama Prefecture: Yawara Hata
- Shiga Prefecture: Masayoshi Takemura
- Shiname Prefecture: Seiji Tsunematsu
- Shizuoka Prefecture: Keizaburō Yamamoto
- Tochigi Prefecture: Fumio Watanabe
- Tokushima Prefecture: Shinzo Miki
- Tokyo: Shun'ichi Suzuki
- Tottori Prefecture: Yuji Nishio
- Toyama Prefecture: Yutaka Nakaoki
- Wakayama Prefecture: Shirō Kariya
- Yamagata Prefecture: Seiichirō Itagaki
- Yamaguchi Prefecture: Toru Hirai
- Yamanashi Prefecture: Kōmei Mochizuki

== Events ==
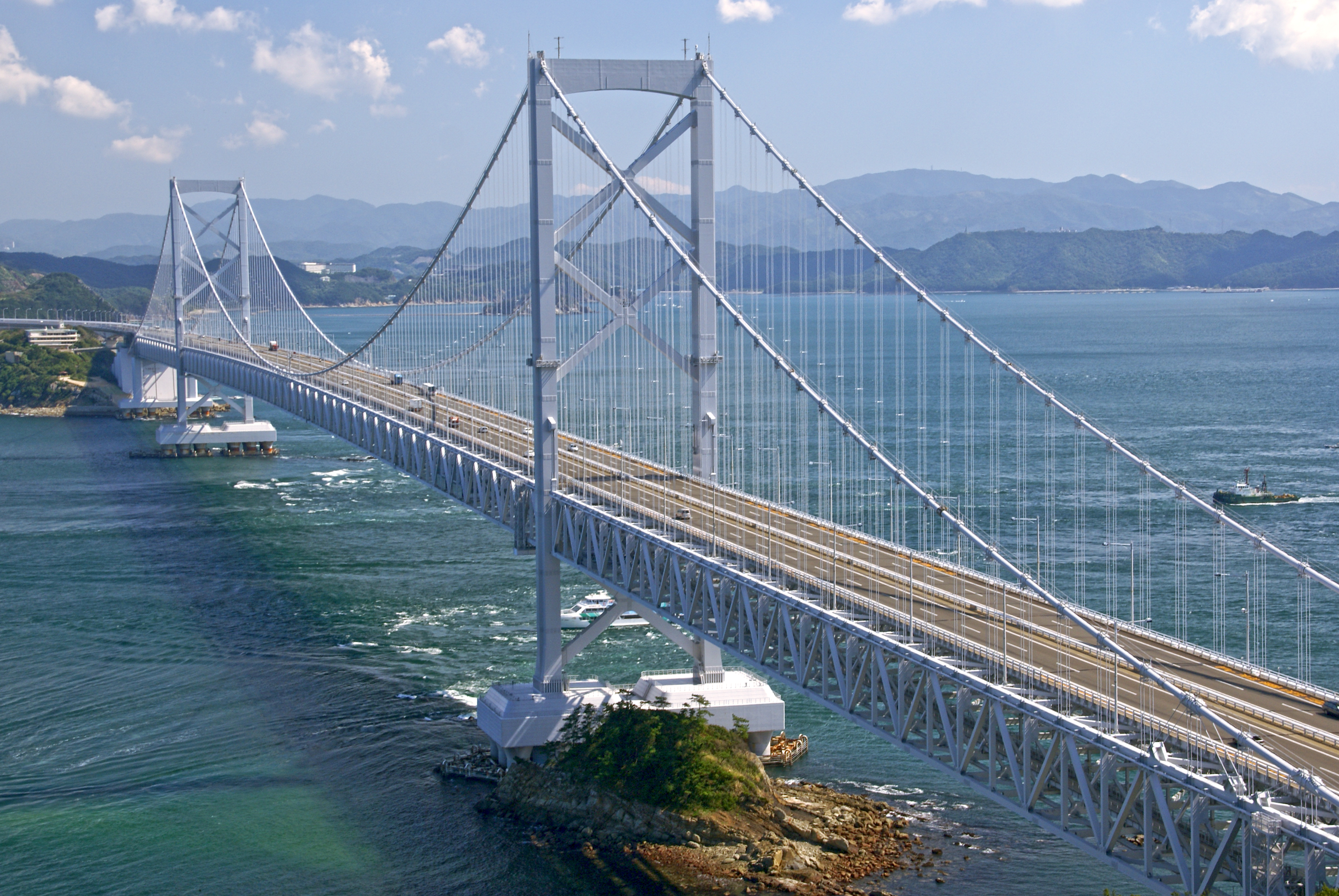
Ōnaruto Bridge, completed in 1985.

- January 28 – twenty-five people were killed when a charter bus carrying students on a ski tour plunged into a river in Nagano.
- March 17 – September 16 – Expo '85 was held at the Tsukuba, Ibaraki prefecture.
- May 17 – sixty-two people were killed after a gas explosion in a Mitsubishi Yubari coal mine, located in Yubari, Hokkaido.
- June 23 – 1985 Narita International Airport bombing; two people were killed.
- August 7 – Takao Doi, Mamoru Mohri and Chiaki Mukai are chosen to be Japan's first astronauts.
- August 12 – Japan Air Lines Flight 123 crashes into Mount Takamagahara. All fifteen crew members and five hundred-five passengers died.
- September 13 – Super Mario Bros. was released for the Family Computer.

== Popular culture ==
=== Arts and entertainment ===
- Film: Gray Sunset, directed by Shunya Ito, won the Best Film award at the Japan Academy Prize. Ran won Best film at the Blue Ribbon Awards. Sorekara won Best film at the Hochi Film Awards and Love Hotel won Best film at the Yokohama Film Festival. For a list of Japanese films released in 1985, please see Japanese films of 1985.
- Manga: Bari Bari Densetsu by Shuichi Shigeno (shōnen) and Okashina Futari by Jūzō Yamasaki and Kei Sadayasu and Mahiro Taiken by Naomi Nishi (both tied for general manga) won the Kodansha Manga Award. The winners of the Shogakukan Manga Award were Bokkemon by Takashi Iwashige (general), Hatsukoi Scandal and Tobe! Jinrui II by Akira Oze (shōnen), Zenryaku Milk House by Yumiko Kawahara (shōjo) and Asari-chan by Mayumi Muroyama (children). Appleseed by Masamune Shirow won the Seiun Award for Best Comic of the Year.
- Music: the Red Team won the 36th Kōhaku Uta Gassen. They were: Hidemi Ishikawa, Naoko Kawai, Teresa Teng, Kyōko Koizumi, Yoshie Kashiwabara, Hiromi Iwasaki, Akina Nakamori, Rumiko Koyanagi, Naoko Ken, Nobue Matsuhara, Yū Hayami, Seiko Matsuda, Tomoyo Harada, Miyuki Kawanaka, Kyoko Suizenji, Chiyoko Shimakura, Aki Yashiro, Sayuri Ishikawa, Sachiko Kobayashi and Masako Mori. Masahiko Kondō won the Japan Music Awards and the Nippon Television Music Festival. Akina Nakamori won the 27th Japan Record Awards and the FNS Music Festival with the song Meu amor é. The May edition of the Yamaha Popular Song Contest was won by ROLL-BACK with the song You & Me Tonight. For other music, see 1985 in Japanese music.
- Japan hosted the Miss International 1985 beauty pageant, won by Nina Sicilia from Venezuela.

=== Sports ===
- Japan hosted the 1985 Summer Universiade, where the country placed 6th with a total of 16 medals, 6 of which were gold. The Soviet Union had the highest total number of medals with 84, and the highest number of gold medals with 42.
- In badminton, Japan hosted the 1985 World Badminton Grand Prix, won by Han Jian (men's singles) and Li Lingwei (women's singles), both from China. At the Japanese National Badminton Championships, Hiroyuki Hasegawa won the Men's singles, Sumiko Kitada the Women's singles, Shinji Matsuura and Shūji Matsuno the Men's doubles, Kazuko Takamine and Kazue Hoshi the Women's doubles and Akio Tomita and Michiko Tomita the Mixed doubles.
- In baseball, the Hanshin Tigers won the 1985 Japan Series against the Seibu Lions. The MVP in the Central League was Randy Bass and in the Pacific League Hiromitsu Ochiai.
- In basketball, the All Japan Intercollegiate Basketball Championship was won by Nippon Sport Science.
- In figure skating, Japan hosted the 1985 World Figure Skating Championships, with the Soviet Union topping the medals table with the most gold and overall total medals. The winners of the 1984–1985 Japan Figure Skating Championships were Masaru Ogawa (men), Midori Ito (women) and Noriko Sato and Tadayuki Takahashi in ice dancing.
- In football (soccer), Japan hosted the final of the 1985 Intercontinental Cup between Juventus FC and Argentinos Juniors, which Juventus won in a 4-2 penalty shootout. Furukawa Electric (currently the JEF United Ichihara Chiba) won the 1985–86 Japan Soccer League. Nissan Motor Company (currently the Yokohama F. Marinos) won the Emperor's Cup. For the champions of the regional leagues see: Japanese Regional Leagues 1985.
- In judo, Japan hosted the 1985 Asian Judo Championships and topped the medals table with the most gold and overall total medals tied with China.
- In rugby union, Ireland toured Japan.
- In swimming, Japan hosted the first Pan Pacific Swimming Championships.
- In tennis, Japan hosted the 1985 Federation Cup, won by Czechoslovakia.

== Births ==
- January 5 – Yuka Koide, model and actress
- January 11 – Rie fu, singer-songwriter
- January 17 – Riyu Kosaka, J-pop singer
- January 20 – Marina Inoue, voice actress and singer
- January 22 – Akira Nagata, singer (Run&Gun), actor and voice actor
- January 28 – Aya Miyama, football player
- January 29
  - Joji Takeuchi, basketball player
  - Kosuke Takeuchi, basketball player
- February 6
  - Joji Kato, speedskater
  - Saki Kagami, actress
- February 17 – Hiroko Sato, actress, singer
- February 28 – Rin Aoki, model and AV actress
- March 6 – Maya Nakanishi, Paralympic athlete
- March 8 – Mio Takeuchi, actress
- March 24
  - Haruka Ayase, actress
  - Sayaka Hirano, table tennis player
- March 25 – Yūsuke Kobayashi, Japanese voice actor
- March 28 – Akiko Suzuki, figure skater
- April 9 – Tomohisa Yamashita, idol, singer
- April 21 – Takuro Fujii, swimmer
- April 24 – Kaori Nazuka, voice actress
- April 26 – Adachi Yurie, ice hockey player
- May 5 – Shoko Nakagawa, actress, voice actress and singer
- May 11 – Sifow, singer
- May 13 – Yusuke Minato, Nordic combined skier
- May 29
  - Nozomi Komuro, skeleton racer
  - Yukihiro Takiguchi, Japanese actor, singer and model (d. 2019)
- June 2 – Miyuki Sawashiro, voice actress
- June 7 – Marie Miyake, voice actress
- June 19 – Ai Miyazato, golfer
- June 22 – Rosa Kato, actress and model
- June 23 – Kavka Shishido, drummer and vocalist
- June 27 – Hiroyuki Taniguchi, football player
- July 3 – Keisuke Minami, actor, singer
- July 11
  - Aki Maeda, actress, singer
  - Takahisa Nishiyama, football player
- July 16
  - Yōko Hikasa, Japanese actress
  - Hiroyuki Onoue, Japanese actor
- July 22 – Akira Tozawa, professional wrestler
- August 17 – Yū Aoi, actress and model
- August 25 – Naho Emoto, baseball player
- September 1 – Kosuke Nakamachi, football player
- September 2 – Hiroyuki Oze, baseball player (d. 2010)
- September 3 – Yūki Kaji, voice actor
- September 10
  - Aya Kamiki, singer
  - Shota Matsuda, actor
- September 11 – Kazutaka Murase, football player
- September 13 – Emi Suzuki, Chinese-born Japanese female model
- September 20 – Mami Yamasaki, gravure idol
- September 23 – Maki Goto, singer, lyricist and former actress
- September 24 – Yōhei Kajiyama, football player
- September 25 – Asami Tanno, sprinter
- October 3 – Megumi Takamoto, voice actress and singer
- October 6 – Yasuharu Nanri, figure skater
- October 8 – Eiji Wentz, singer, entertainer, and actor
- October 13 – Yoshihisa Naruse, baseball player
- October 18 – Iori Nomizu, voice actress, actress and singer
- October 21 – Yasuhiro Inaba, freestyle wrestler
- October 22
  - Manpei Takagi, actor
  - Shinpei Takagi, actor
- November 18 – Hiromi Miyake, weightlifter
- November 25 – Masatsugu Kawachi, boxer
- November 30
  - Hikari Mitsushima, actress, singer
  - Aoi Miyazaki, actress
- December 14
  - Katsuya Kitamura, wrestler (d. 2022)
  - Nonami Takizawa, actress
- December 15 – Madoka Harada, luger
- December 16 – Keita Tachibana, singer
- December 22 – Yuta Ikeda, golfer
- December 26 – Yuu Shirota, actor
- December 27 – Daiki Ito, ski jumper

== Deaths ==
- January 9 – Nichidatsu Fujii, Buddhist monk (b. 1885)
- January 27 – Masahisa Takenaka, 4th kumicho of the Yamaguchi-gumi (b. 1933)
- January 31 – Tatsuzō Ishikawa, novelist (b. 1905)
- March 30
  - Kenkichi Oshima, athlete (b. 1908)
  - Yaeko Nogami, author (b. 1885)
  - Shizuko Kasagi, singer (b. 1914)
- April 12 – Seiji Miyaguchi, actor (b. 1913)
- June 9 – Matsutarō Kawaguchi, novelist (b. 1899)
- June 24 – Kuninori Marumo, admiral in the Imperial Japanese Navy (b. 1891)
- July 7 – Shōzō Sakurai, general (b. 1899)
- August 12 – Kyu Sakamoto, singer and actor (b. 1941)
- August 17 – Matsuo Kishi, film critic, filmmaker (b. 1906)
- September 11 – Masako Natsume, model and actress (b. 1957)
- September 27 – Ryūtarō Ōtomo, film actor (b. 1912)
- October 13 – Eiji Kanie, voice actor (b. 1941)
- October 21 – Masuiyama Daishirō I, sumo wrestler (b. 1919)
- October 26 – Kikuko Kawakami, author (b. 1904)
- November 1 – Ōuchiyama Heikichi, sumo wrestler (b. 1926)
- December 21 – Kamatari Fujiwara, actor (b. 1905)
- December 24 – Kouzou Sasaki, politician, chairman of the Japan Socialist Party (b. 1900)

== See also ==
- 1985 in Japanese television
- List of Japanese films of 1985
