= 1988 in Japan =

- Decades: 1960s; 1970s; 1980s; 1990s; 2000s
- See also: Other events of 1988; History of Japan • Timeline • Years

Events in the year 1988 in Japan. It corresponds to Shōwa 63 (昭和63年) in the Japanese calendar.

== Incumbents ==
- Emperor: Shōwa
- Prime Minister: Noboru Takeshita (L–Shimane)
- Chief Cabinet Secretary: Keizo Obuchi (L–Gunma)
- Chief Justice of the Supreme Court: Kōichi Yaguchi
- President of the House of Representatives: Kenzaburō Hara (L–Hyōgo)
- President of the House of Councillors: Masaaki Fujita (L–Hiroshima) until September 30, Yoshihiko Tsuchiya (L–Saitama)
- Diet sessions: 112th (regular session opened in December 1987, until May 25), 113th (extraordinary, July 19 to December 28), 114th (regular, December 30 to 1989, June 22)

=== Governors ===
- Aichi Prefecture: Reiji Suzuki
- Akita Prefecture: Kikuji Sasaki
- Aomori Prefecture: Masaya Kitamura
- Chiba Prefecture: Takeshi Numata
- Ehime Prefecture: Sadayuki Iga
- Fukui Prefecture: Yukio Kurita
- Fukuoka Prefecture: Hachiji Okuda
- Fukushima Prefecture: Isao Matsudaira (until 18 September); Eisaku Satō (starting 19 September)
- Gifu Prefecture: Yosuke Uematsu
- Gunma Prefecture: Ichiro Shimizu
- Hiroshima Prefecture: Toranosuke Takeshita
- Hokkaido: Takahiro Yokomichi
- Hyogo Prefecture: Toshitami Kaihara
- Ibaraki Prefecture: Fujio Takeuchi
- Ishikawa Prefecture: Yōichi Nakanishi
- Iwate Prefecture: Tadashi Nakamura
- Kagawa Prefecture: Jōichi Hirai
- Kagoshima Prefecture: Kaname Kamada
- Kanagawa Prefecture: Kazuji Nagasu
- Kochi Prefecture: Chikara Nakauchi
- Kumamoto Prefecture: Morihiro Hosokawa
- Kyoto Prefecture: Teiichi Aramaki
- Mie Prefecture: Ryōzō Tagawa
- Miyagi Prefecture: Sōichirō Yamamoto
- Miyazaki Prefecture: Suketaka Matsukata
- Nagano Prefecture: Gorō Yoshimura
- Nagasaki Prefecture: Isamu Takada
- Nara Prefecture: Shigekiyo Ueda
- Niigata Prefecture: Takeo Kimi
- Oita Prefecture: Morihiko Hiramatsu
- Okayama Prefecture: Shiro Nagano
- Okinawa Prefecture: Junji Nishime
- Osaka Prefecture: Sakae Kishi
- Saga Prefecture: Kumao Katsuki
- Saitama Prefecture: Yawara Hata
- Shiga Prefecture: Minoru Inaba
- Shiname Prefecture: Nobuyoshi Sumita
- Shizuoka Prefecture: Shigeyoshi Saitō
- Tochigi Prefecture: Fumio Watanabe
- Tokushima Prefecture: Shinzo Miki
- Tokyo: Shun'ichi Suzuki
- Tottori Prefecture: Yuji Nishio
- Toyama Prefecture: Yutaka Nakaoki
- Wakayama Prefecture: Shirō Kariya
- Yamagata Prefecture: Seiichirō Itagaki
- Yamaguchi Prefecture: Toru Hirai
- Yamanashi Prefecture: Kōmei Mochizuki

== Events ==
- February 10: Dragon Quest III is released for the Family Computer. Over one million copies were sold on the first day and around 300 arrests were made among students absent from school to purchase the game.
- March 13: Seikan Tunnel opens, connecting Hokkaido and Honshu by rail for the first time.
- March 17: Tokyo Dome completed.
- April 4 and 5: Rock band Boøwy hold their last concert in Tokyo Dome and break up.
- April 10: Great Seto Bridge opens.
- April 16: Studio Ghibli films My Neighbor Totoro and Grave of the Fireflies are released simultaneously.
- June 18: Asahi Shimbun breaks the Recruit scandal.
- July 16: The anime film Akira is released.
- July 21: A heavy torrential rain with debris flow in Kake, Hiroshima Prefecture and Hamada, Shimane Prefecture, According to Fire and Disaster Management Agency of Japan official confirmed report, 27 persons lost their lives, 45 were wounded.
- July 23: A sports fishing boat, Fuji Maru No. 1, collides with a submarine, Nadashio, in Tokyo Bay, resulting in the former sinking and 30 deaths as well as 17 injuries.
- September 14: Daiei purchases the Nankai Hawks baseball team: they become the Fukuoka Daiei Hawks.
- October 3: Anpanman premieres on Nippon TV.
- October 19: Orix purchases the Hankyu Braves baseball team: they become the Orix Braves.
- October 23: Super Mario Bros. 3 is released for the Family Computer.
- October 29: The Sega Mega Drive is released in Japan.
- December 9: Finance Minister Kiichi Miyazawa resigns amid the Recruit scandal.
- December 27: Takeshita announces a realigned cabinet.
- December 30: According to a Japan National Police Agency official confirmed report, an armored car with 222.5 million yen in cash and 170 million yen in checks was robbed in Suma-ku, Kobe, Hyogo Prefecture. The suspect is escape continue, and still not detained, according to JNPA official.

== Births ==
=== January ===
- January 1: Saori Hara, AV idol, model, and actress
- January 2: Yusuke Suzuki, race walker
- January 13: Maon Kurosaki, singer-songwriter (died 2023)
- January 28: Sanada, wrestler

=== February ===
- February 7: Ai Kago, performer
- February 8: Nozomi Sasaki, glamour model
- February 12: Nana Eikura, model, actress, and occasional radio show host
- February 15: Hironori Kusano, singer and actor
- February 19: Miyu Irino, voice actor
- February 26: Hitomi Niiya, long-distance runner

=== March ===
- March 11: Katsuhiko Nakajima, professional wrestler
- March 22: Noriko Kijima, gravure idol and actress
- March 27: Atsuto Uchida, footballer

=== April ===
- April 5: Asumi Nakata, child model and voice actress
- April 13: Tsubasa Aizawa, professional baseball player
- April 16: Shogo Akiyama, professional baseball player
- April 19: Haruna Kojima, singer, actress and idol

=== May ===
- May 1: Takeshi Suzuki, alpine skier
- May 18:
  - Hirooki Arai, Japanese racewalker
  - Tatsuma Ito, tennis player
- May 26: Akito Watabe, Nordic combined skier
- May 28: Meisa Kuroki, actress, model, and singer

=== June ===
- June 1: Nami Tamaki, singer
- June 11
  - Yui Aragaki, model, actress and singer
  - Ayako Kimura, sprinter
- June 22: Miliyah Kato, pop and urban singer-songwriter
- June 27: Chisato Fukushima, track and field sprint athlete
- June 28
  - Gaku Hamada, film and television actor
  - Kanon Wakeshima, singer and cellist

=== July ===
- July 15: Maiko Kano, volleyball player
- July 26: Sayaka Akimoto, singer, actress and idol

=== August ===
- August 17: Erika Toda, actress

=== September ===
- September 2: Keisuke Kato, actor and entertainer
- September 7: Daiki Sato, footballer (d. 2010)
- September 8: Rie Kaneto, Olympic swimmer
- September 13: Nobuyuki Tsujii, pianist and composer
- September 18: Yuichi Sugita, tennis player
- September 20
  - Arisa Sato, model and weather-caster
  - Chiaki Satō, actress
  - Ayano Ōmoto, singer and dancer
- September 23: Kairi Sane, professional wrestler and actress
- September 25: Mariya Ise, voice actress
- September 26: Yūdai Ōno, professional baseball player
- September 29: Osama Elsamni, football player

=== October ===
- October 2: Kirara Asuka, model adult video actress
- October 6: Maki Horikita, actress and endorser
- October 17: Yuko Oshima, idol, singer and actress
- October 20: Risa Niigaki, J-pop singer

=== November ===
- November 1: Ai Fukuhara, table tennis player
- November 7: Kim Chae-Hwa, figure skater
- November 8: Honami Tajima, actress
- November 14: Takurō Ōno, actor
- November 26: Yumi Kobayashi, fashion model

=== December ===
- December 4: Miki Kanie, archer
- December 14: Hayato Sakamoto, professional baseball player
- December 19: Mami Matsuyama, idol
- December 23: Eri Kamei, J-pop singer
- December 26: Kayo Satoh, model and television personality

== Deaths ==
- January 2: Yukio Kasahara, general (b. 1889)
- March 1: Yoshi Katō, actor (b. 1913)
- April 10: Shigeo Sugiura, freestyle swimmer and Olympic gold medalist (b. 1917)
- April 23: Eitaro Ozawa, actor (b. 1909)
- May 23: Aya Kitō, writer (b. 1962)
- June 14: Prince Kan'in Haruhito, career officer (b. 1902)
- August 4: Toshio Doko, business leader (b. 1896)
- November 4: Takeo Miki, former prime minister (b. 1907)
- November 23: Kenzō Masaoka, anime creator (b. 1898)
- December 16: Ryōhei Koiso, artist (b. 1903)
- December 24: Mumon Yamada, Rinzai religious leader (b. 1900)
- December 25: Shōhei Ōoka, writer (b. 1909)
- December 30: Takeo Fujisawa, businessman, co-founder of Honda Motor Co., Ltd. (b. 1910)

== Statistics ==
- Yen value: US$1 = ¥122 (low) to ¥135 (high)

== See also ==
- 1988 in Japanese television
- List of Japanese films of 1988
- 1988 in Japanese music
