= 1911 in Japan =

- Decades: 1890s; 1900s; 1910s; 1920s; 1930s
- See also: Other events of 1911; History of Japan • Timeline • Years

Events in the year 1911 in Japan. It corresponds to Meiji 44 (明治44年) in the Japanese calendar.

== Incumbents ==
- Emperor: Emperor Meiji
- Prime Minister:
  - Katsura Tarō (until August 30)
  - Saionji Kinmochi (starting August 30)

=== Governors ===
- Aichi Prefecture: Ichizo Fukano
- Akita Prefecture: Mori Masataka
- Aomori Prefecture: Takeda Chiyosaburo
- Ehime Prefecture: Takio Izawa
- Fukui Prefecture: Nakamura Junkuro
- Fukushima Prefecture: Shotaro Nishizawa
- Gifu Prefecture: Sadakichi Usu
- Gunma Prefecture: Uruji Kamiyama
- Hiroshima Prefecture: Tadashi Munakata
- Ibaraki Prefecture: Keisuke Sakanaka
- Iwate Prefecture: Shinichi Kasai
- Kagawa Prefecture: Kogoro Kanokogi
- Kochi Prefecture: Goro Sugiyama
- Kumamoto Prefecture: Kawaji Toshikyo
- Kyoto Prefecture: Baron Shoichi Omori
- Mie Prefecture: Kubota Kiyochika, Magoichi Tahara
- Miyagi Prefecture: Hiroyuki Terada
- Miyazaki Prefecture: Tadayoshi Naokichi then Tadakazu Ariyoshi
- Nagano Prefecture: Chiba Sadamiki
- Nara Prefecture: Prince Kiyoshi Honba then Mori Masataka then Izawa Takio
- Niigata Prefecture: Prince Kiyoshi Honba
- Okinawa Prefecture: Shigeaki Hibi
- Osaka Prefecture: Marques Okubo Toshi Takeshi
- Saga Prefecture: Shimada Gotaro
- Saitama Prefecture: Shimada Gotaro
- Shiname Prefecture: Maruyama Shigetoshi then Takaoka Naokichi
- Tochigi Prefecture: ..... then Okada Bunji
- Tokyo: Hiroshi Abe
- Tottori Prefecture: Oka Kishichiro Itami
- Toyama Prefecture: Mabuchi Eitaro
- Yamagata Prefecture: Mabuchi Eitaro

== Events ==
- February unknown – Kobayashi Gas Appliance Manufacturing, as predecessor of Paloma, a gas cooking and heating appliance manufacturing brand, was founded in Nagoya.
- February 1 – Regulations for postal special delivery are passed. Service begins on February 11.
- February 22 – One of Japan's most well-known authors, Natsume Sōseki, sends a letter to the Ministry of Education, refusing the title of professor of literature. He explains that he just wants to go on living his life as "Natsume so-and-so."
- March 1 – The Imperial Theater is completed, but is later lost to fire during the Great Kanto earthquake.
- March 29 – Japan passes its first labor law.
- April 23 – Yoshitoshi Tokugawa sets a Japanese record with a Blériot Aéronautique, flying 48 miles in 1 hour 9 minutes 30 seconds.
- May Unknown date – Tamura Fishery Association, as predecessor of Nissui, founded in Shimonoseki, Yamaguchi Prefecture.
- June 20 – Idemitsu Shokai, as predecessor of Idemitsu Showa Shell Petroleum, founded in Moji, now part of Kitakyushu, Fukuoka Prefecture.
- August 30 – Saionji Kinmochi is appointed Prime Minister of Japan.
- September – Five women: Hiratsuka Raichō, Yasumochi Yoshiko, Mozume Kazuko, Kiuchi Teiko, and Nakano Hatsuko begin publishing the literary magazine Seitosha to promote the equal rights of women through literature and education.
- Unknown Dated – Namura Shipbuildings was founded in Osaka.

== Births ==
- January 11 – Zenko Suzuki, politician, 70th Prime Minister of Japan (d. 2004)
- January 13 – Masayuki Mori, actor (d. 1973)
- February 5 – Mitsuo Nakamura, writer (d. 1988)
- February 7 – Takako Irie, film actress (d. 1995)
- February 15 – Kimiyoshi Yasuda, film director (d. 1983)
- February 26 – Tarō Okamoto, artist (d. 1996)
- April 8 – Ichirō Fujiyama, composer and singer (d. 1993)
- May 7 – Ishirō Honda, film director (d. 1993)
- May 21 – Tanie Kitabayashi, actress (d. 2010)
- June 26 – Toyo Shibata, poet (d. 2013)
- July 7 – Shunpei Hashioka, Olympic boxer (d. 1978)
- September 1 – Kōmei Abe, composer (d. 2006)
- October 4 – Shigeaki Hinohara, physician (d. 2017)
- October 21 – Yoshinori Yagi, author (d. 1999)
- November 30 – Tamura Taijiro, novelist (d. 1983)
- December 10 – Tatsugo Kawaishi, swimmer (d. 1945)
- December 26 – Kikuko Tokugawa, later "Kikuko, Princess Takamatsu", wife of Prince Nobuhito (d. 2004)

== Deaths ==
- January 19 – Chizuko Mifune, clairvoyant (b. 1886)
- January 24:
  - Uchiyama Gudō, Zen Buddhist priest and anarcho-socialist (executed) (b. 1874)
  - Shūsui Kōtoku, journalist and anarchist (executed) (b. 1871)
  - Kanno Sugako, journalist, feminist and anarchist (executed) (b. 1881)
- March 25 – Shigeru Aoki, painter (b. 1882)
- May 13 – Tani Tateki, army officer (b. 1837)
- June 15 – Ōtori Keisuke, diplomat (b. 1833)
- September 16 – Hishida Shunsō, painter (b. 1874)
- November 11 – Otojirō Kawakami, actor and comedian (b. 1864)
- November 25 – Komura Jutarō, politician (b. 1855)
