= 1908 in Japan =

- Decades: 1880s; 1890s; 1900s; 1910s; 1920s
- See also: Other events of 1908; History of Japan • Timeline • Years

Events in the year 1908 in Japan. It corresponds to Meiji 41 (明治41年) in the Japanese calendar.

== Incumbents ==
- Emperor: Emperor Meiji
- Prime Minister:
  - Saionji Kinmochi (until July 14)
  - Katsura Tarō (from July 14)

=== Governors ===
- Aichi Prefecture: Masaaki Nomura
- Akita Prefecture: Chuji Shimooka, Mori Masataka
- Aomori Prefecture: Shotaro Nishizawa, Takeda Chiyosaburo
- Ehime Prefecture: Kensuke Ando
- Fukui Prefecture: Nakamura Junkuro
- Fukushima Prefecture: Hiraoka Teitaro then Shotaro Nishizawa
- Gifu Prefecture: Sadakichi Usu
- Gunma Prefecture: Arita Yoshisuke then Nanbu Mitsumi then Uruji Kamiyama
- Hiroshima Prefecture: Tadashi Munakata
- Ibaraki Prefecture: Mori Masataka, Keisuke Sakanaka
- Iwate Prefecture: Shinichi Kasai
- Kagawa Prefecture: Motohiro Onoda
- Kochi Prefecture: Sada Suzuki, Kenzo Ishihara
- Kumamoto Prefecture: Nori Oshikawa, Kawaji Toshikyo
- Kyoto Prefecture: Baron Shoichi Omori
- Mie Prefecture: Lord Arimitsu Hideyoshi, Hayashi Ichizo, Yoshisuke Arita
- Miyagi Prefecture: Kamei Ezaburo, Hiroyuki Terada
- Miyazaki Prefecture: Nagai Enjin, Tadayoshi Naokichi
- Nagano Prefecture: Akira Oyama
- Niigata Prefecture: Prince Kiyoshi Honba
- Okinawa Prefecture: Shigeru Narahara, Shigeaki Hibi
- Saga Prefecture: Fai Kagawa, Inoue Takashihara, Nishimura Mutsu
- Saitama Prefecture: Shimada Gotaro
- Shiname Prefecture: Matsunaga Takeyoshi, Raizo Wakabayashi, Maruyama Shigetoshi
- Tochigi Prefecture: .....
- Tokyo: Baron Sangay Takatomi, Hiroshi Abe
- Toyama Prefecture: Shinhare Kawakami, Usami Katsuo
- Yamagata Prefecture: Mabuchi Eitaro

== Events ==
- April 30 – Masako, Princess Tsune, sixth daughter of Emperor Meiji, marries Prince Tsunehisa Takeda.
- May 15 – 1908 Japanese general election
- June 22 – Red Flag Incident
- November 30 – Root–Takahira Agreement
- Unknown date – Yasui Sewing Machine, as predecessor of Brother Industries founded in Nagoya.

== Births ==
- February 27 – Kazuo Hasegawa, actor (d. 1984)
- February 29 – Masahiro Makino, film director (d. 1993)
- April 11 – Masaru Ibuka, electronics industrialist, co-founder of Sony (d. 1997)
- May 23 – Tomiko Itooka, supercentenarian, Japan's oldest living People (since December 12 2023-December 29 2024) world's oldest living person (August 19 2024-December 29 2024) (d. 2024)
- July 8 – Kaii Higashiyama, painter (d. 2009)
- July 9 – Takashi Asahina, conductor (d. 2001)
- September 14 – Nobuo Nakamura, actor (d. 1991)
- October 17 – Kenji Miyamoto, communist politician (d. 2007)
- November 10 – Kenkichi Oshima, triple jumper (d. 1985)
- November 11 – Sadako Sawamura, actress (d. 1996)
- December 27 – Tadao Tannaka, triple jumper (d. 1986)

== Deaths ==
- January 13 – Hashimoto Gahō, painter (b. 1835)
- March 25 – Iwasaki Yanosuke, businessman, and 4th Governor of the Bank of Japan (b. 1851)
- May 2 – Prince Yamashina Kikumaro, (b. 1873)
- June 23 – Doppo Kunikida, author and poet (b. 1871)
- October 18 – Nozu Michitsura, field marshal (b. 1840)
- October 26 – Enomoto Takeaki, politician, President of the Republic of Ezo (b. 1836)
- November 25 – Inagaki Manjirō, diplomat (b. 1861)
- December 17 – Inoue Hikaru general (b. 1851)
