= 1907 in Japan =

- Decades: 1880s; 1890s; 1900s; 1910s; 1920s
- See also: Other events of 1907; History of Japan; Timeline; Years

Events in the year 1907 in Japan. It corresponds to Meiji 40 (明治40年) in the Japanese calendar.

== Incumbents ==
- Emperor: Emperor Meiji
- Prime Minister: Saionji Kinmochi

=== Governors ===
- Aichi Prefecture: Ichizo Fukano
- Akita Prefecture: Chuji Shimooka
- Aomori Prefecture: Shotaro Nishizawa
- Ehime Prefecture: Kensuke Ando
- Fukui Prefecture: Suke Sakamoto, Nakamura Junkuro
- Fukushima Prefecture: Arita Yoshisuke then Hiraoka Teitaro
- Gifu Prefecture: Sadakichi Usu
- Gunma Prefecture: Yoshimi Teru, Arita Yoshisuke
- Hiroshima Prefecture: Yamada Shunzō, Tadashi Munakata
- Ibaraki Prefecture: Otsuka, Mori Masataka
- Iwate Prefecture: Sokkichi Oshikawa, Shinichi Kasai
- Kagawa Prefecture: Motohiro Onoda
- Kumamoto Prefecture: Egi Kazuyuki, Norikichi Oshikawa
- Kōchi Prefecture: Munakata Tadashi, Sada Suzuki
- Kyoto Prefecture: Shoichi Omori
- Mie Prefecture: Baron Shoichi Omori
- Miyagi Prefecture: Kamei Ezaburo
- Miyazaki Prefecture: Nagai Enjin
- Nagano Prefecture: Tsunamasa Ōyama
- Niigata Prefecture: Hiroshi Abe, Kiyoshi Honba
- Okayama Prefecture: Terada Yushi
- Okinawa Prefecture: Narahara Shigeru
- Osaka Prefecture: Chikaaki Takasaki
- Saga Prefecture: Fai Kagawa
- Saitama Prefecture: Marquis Okubo, Toshi Takeshi, Shimada Gotaro
- Shiga Prefecture: Sada Suzuki
- Shimane Prefecture: Matsunaga Takeyoshi
- Tochigi Prefecture: .....
- Tokyo: Baron Senge Takatomi
- Toyama Prefecture: Usami Katsuo
- Yamagata Prefecture: Mabuchi Eitaro

== Events ==
- February 5 – Nisshin Spinning, later Nisshinbo founded.
- February 15 – Gentlemen's Agreement of 1907
- May Unknown date
  - Maruzen Petroleum, as predecessor of Cosmo Petroleum was founded in Osaka.
  - Seasoning, food processing, medication brand, Ajinomoto was founded by Saburosuke Suzuki in Kyobashi, Tokyo, as predecessor name was Suzuki Pharmaceutical Manufacturing.
- May 11 – Hinode Life Insurance, later Sumitomo Life Insurance was founded.
- June 10 – Franco-Japanese Treaty of 1907
- July 24 – Japan–Korea Treaty of 1907
- September 7 – Asahi Grass (now AGC) founded in Amagasaki, Hyogo Prefecture.

== Births ==
- January 1 – Kinue Hitomi, sprinter and long jumper (d. 1931)
- January 8 – Keizō Hayashi, civil servant (d. 1991)
- January 23 – Hideki Yukawa, theoretical physicist, Nobel laureate (d. 1981)
- February 25 – Utaemon Ichikawa, actor (d. 1999)
- March 17 – Takeo Miki, 41st Prime Minister of Japan (d. 1988)
- April 29 – Chūya Nakahara, poet (d. 1937)
- May 6 – Yasushi Inoue, author (d. 1991)
- June 29 – Junji Nishikawa, footballer
- July 15 – Shōshin Nagamine, karate master, author, soldier and police officer (d. 1997)
- August 1 – Hisato Ohzawa, composer (d. 1953)
- August 12 – Noriko Awaya, soprano chanson and ryūkōka singer (d. 1999)
- October 1 – Ryōichi Hattori, composer (d. 1993)

== Deaths ==
- March 12 – Matsumoto Jun, physician (b. 1832)
- September 2 – Kuga Katsunan, journalist (b. 1857)
- October 5 – Nakayama Yoshiko, lady-in-waiting, mother of Emperor Meiji (b. 1836)
- December 16 – Asai Chū, painter (b. 1856)
