= 1909 in Japan =

- Decades: 1880s; 1890s; 1900s; 1910s; 1920s
- See also: Other events of 1909; History of Japan • Timeline • Years

Events in the year 1909 in Japan. It corresponds to Meiji 42 (明治42年) in the Japanese calendar.

== Incumbents ==
- Emperor: Emperor Meiji
- Prime Minister: Katsura Tarō

=== Governors ===
- Aichi Prefecture: Masaaki Nomura
- Akita Prefecture: Mori Masataka
- Aomori Prefecture: Takeda Chiyosaburo
- Ehime Prefecture: Kensuke Ando then Takio Izawa
- Fukui Prefecture: Nakamura Junkuro
- Fukushima Prefecture: Shotaro Nishizawa
- Gifu Prefecture: Sadakichi Usu
- Gunma Prefecture: Uruji Kamiyama
- Hiroshima Prefecture: Tadashi Munakata
- Ibaraki Prefecture: Keisuke Sakanaka
- Iwate Prefecture: Shinichi Kasai
- Kagawa Prefecture: Motohiro Onoda
- Kumamoto Prefecture: Kawaji Toshikyo
- Kochi Prefecture: Kenzo Ishihara
- Kyoto Prefecture: Kawaji Toshikyo
- Mie Prefecture: Yoshisuke Arita
- Miyagi Prefecture: Hiroyuki Terada
- Miyazaki Prefecture: Tadayoshi Naokichi
- Nagano Prefecture: Akira Oyama
- Nara Prefecture: Raizo Wakabayashi
- Niigata Prefecture: Prince Kiyoshi Honba
- Okinawa Prefecture: Shigeaki Hibi
- Osaka Prefecture: Tadashini Kikuchi
- Saga Prefecture: Nishimura Mutsu
- Saitama Prefecture: Shimada Gotaro
- Shiname Prefecture: Maruyama Shigetoshi
- Tochigi Prefecture: .....
- Tokyo: Hiroshi Abe
- Toyama Prefecture: Usami Katsuo
- Yamagata Prefecture: Mabuchi Eitaro

== Events ==
- April 29 – Fusako, Princess Kane, seventh daughter of Emperor Meiji, marries Prince Naruhisa Kitashirakawa.
- May 6 – Nobuko, Princess Fumi, eighth daughter of Emperor Meiji, marries Prince Yasuhiko Asaka
- September 4 – Japan and China sign the Jiandao/Gando Treaty, which gives Japan a way to receive railroad concessions in Manchuria.
- September 8 – A bottle glass, sheet glass and display product and sales brand, AGC was founded in Amagasaki, Hyogo Prefecture, as predecessor name was Asahi Glass.
- October Unknown date – Motorbike and compact car brand Suzuki founded, as predecessor name is Suzuki Weaving Machine Manufacturing.
- October 26 – Itō Hirobumi, four time Prime Minister of Japan (the 1st, 5th, 7th and 10th) and Resident-General of Korea, is assassinated by An Jung-geun at the Harbin Railway Station in Manchuria.

== Births ==
- January 6 – Haruko Sugimura, film actress (d. 1997)
- January 20 – Gōgen Yamaguchi, martial artist (d. 1989)
- March 4 – Prince Tsuneyoshi Takeda (d. 1992)
- March 6 – Shōhei Ōoka, writer (d. 1988)
- March 9 – Shizue Natsukawa, actress (d. 1999)
- March 27 – Eitaro Ozawa, actor (d. 1988)
- March 29 – Kiyoteru Hanada, literary critic and essayist (d. 1974)
- April 14 – Yoshikata Yoda, screenwriter (d. 1991)
- May 5 – Atsushi Nakajima, author (d. 1942)
- June 19
  - Osamu Dazai, writer (d. 1948)
  - Midori Naka, stage actress (d. 1945)
- August 11 – Yuji Koseki, composer (d. 1989)
- September 9 – Setsuko Matsudaira, wife of Prince Chichibu (d. 1995)
- November 7
  - Ken Uehara, film actor (d. 1991)
  - Sadao Yamanaka, film director and screenwriter (d. 1938)
- November 16 – Michio Mado, poet (d. 2014)
- November 29 – Kinuyo Tanaka, film actress (d. 1977)
- December 21 – Seichō Matsumoto, writer (d. 1992)

== Deaths ==
- May 10 – Futabatei Shimei, author, translator, and literary critic (b. 1864)
- July 19 – Arai Ikunosuke, samurai, navy minister of the Republic of Ezo (b. 1836)
- October 26 – Itō Hirobumi, statesman (b. 1841)
- November 14 – Yamakawa Futaba, educator (b. 1844)
- December 8 – Prince Kaya Kuninori (b. 1867)
