= 1910 in Japan =

- Decades: 1890s; 1900s; 1910s; 1920s; 1930s
- See also: Other events of 1910; History of Japan • Timeline • Years

Events in the year 1910 in Japan. It corresponds to Meiji 43 (明治43年) in the Japanese calendar.

== Incumbents ==
- Emperor: Emperor Meiji
- Prime Minister: Katsura Tarō

=== Governors ===
- Aichi Prefecture: Ichizo Fukano
- Akita Prefecture: Mori Masataka
- Aomori Prefecture: Takeda Chiyosaburo
- Ehime Prefecture: Takio Izawa
- Fukui Prefecture: Nakamura Junkuro
- Fukushima Prefecture: Shotaro Nishizawa
- Gifu Prefecture: Sadakichi Usu
- Gunma Prefecture: Uruji Kamiyama
- Hiroshima Prefecture: Tadashi Munakata
- Ibaraki Prefecture: Keisuke Sakanaka
- Iwate Prefecture: Shinichi Kasai
- Kagawa Prefecture: Motohiro Onoda then Kogoro Kanokogi
- Kanagawa Prefecture: Kenzo Ishihara then Goro Sugiyama
- Kochi Prefecture: Kenzo Ishihara then Goro Sugiyama
- Kunamoto Prefecture: Kawaji Toshikyo
- Kyoto Prefecture: Shoichi Omori
- Mie Prefecture: Yoshisuke Arita
- Miyagi Prefecture: Hiroyuki Terada
- Miyazaki Prefecture: Tadayoshi Naokichi
- Nagano Prefecture: Akira Oyama then Chiba Sadamiki
- Niigata Prefecture: Prince Kiyoshi Honba
- Saga Prefecture: Nishimura Mutsu then Fuwa
- Saitama Prefecture: Shimada Gotaro
- Shiname Prefecture: Maruyama Shigetoshi
- Tochigi Prefecture: .....
- Tokyo: Hiroshi Abe
- Tottori: Oka Kishichiro Itami
- Toyama Prefecture: Usami Katsuo then Tsunenosuke Hamada
- Yamagata Prefecture: Mabuchi Eitaro

== Events ==
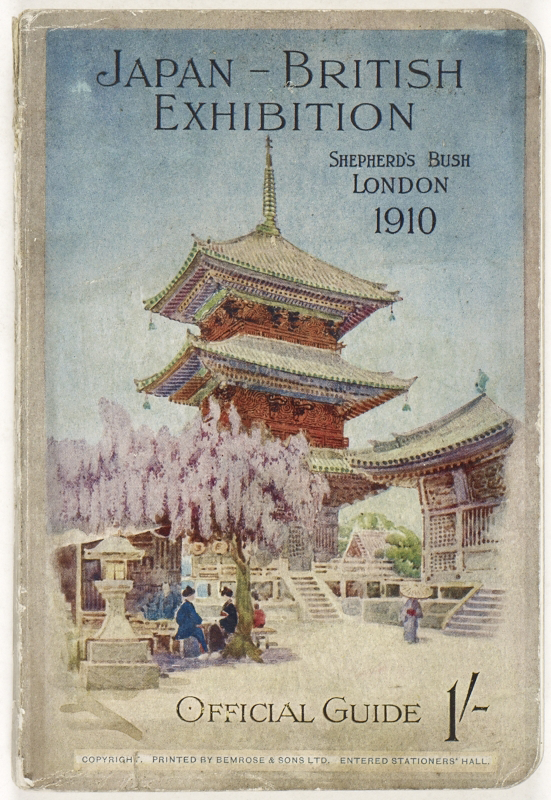
Official guide to the Japan-British Exhibition of 1910

- May 14 – The Japan–British Exhibition opens at White City, London, the largest international exposition the Empire of Japan had participated in up to that time.
- May 20 – Kōtoku Incident: police searching the room of Miyashita Takichi, discover a socialist-anarchist plot to assassinate the Japanese Emperor Meiji, leading to mass arrests.
- August 22 – Japan–Korea Treaty of 1910: Japan formally annexes Korea. The treaty was proclaimed to the public (and became effective) on August 29, 1910, officially starting the period of Japanese rule in Korea.
- October 1 – The Nippon Columbia record label is founded by Nipponophone Co., Ltd.
- November – A confectionery brand Fujiya founded in Yokohama.
- December – The Japanese Antarctic Expedition leaves Tokyo, led by Nobu Shirase.

== Births ==
- January 7 – Masako Shirasu, novelist (d. 1998)
- January 21 – Hideo Shinojima, footballer (d. 1975)
- February 6 – Komako Hara, film actress (d. 1968)
- February 19 – Prince Nagahisa Kitashirakawa (d. 1940)
- March 12 – Masayoshi Ōhira, politician (d. 1980)
- March 23 – Akira Kurosawa, screenwriter, producer, and director (d. 1998)
- May 16 – Higashifushimi Kunihide, Buddhist monk (d. 2014)
- September 10 – Kozaburo Hirai, composer (d. 2002)
- September 22 – Hidekichi Miyazaki, athlete (d. 2019)
- October 10 – Ichiji Tasaki, biophysicist (d. 2009)
- November 10 – Takeo Fujisawa, businessman (d. 1988)
- November 15 – Yatarō Kurokawa, actor (d. 1984)

== Deaths ==
- March 3 – Sasaki Takayuki, government minister and court official (b. 1830)
- April 15 – Tsutomu Sakuma, career naval officer and pioneer submarine commander (b. 1879)
- April 22 – Rokuzan Ogiwara, sculptor (b. 1879)
- June 11 – Kataharu Matsudaira daimyō (b. 1869)
- July 3
  - Tokugawa Akitake, daimyō (b. 1853)
  - Matasaburō Watanabe, politician (b. 1850)
- August 2 – Inoue Masaru, Director of Railways in Japan (b. 1843)
- August 26 – Ume Kenjirō, legal scholar (b. 1860)
- September 13 – Sone Arasuke, politician and Japanese Resident-General of Korea (b. 1849)
- October 24 – Yamada Bimyō, novelist (b. 1868)
- November 5 – Nishio Tadaatsu, daimyō (b. 1850)

== See also ==
- List of Japanese films of the 1910s
