= 1906 in Japan =

- Decades: 1880s; 1890s; 1900s; 1910s; 1920s
- See also: Other events of 1906; History of Japan; Timeline; Years

Events in the year 1906 in Japan. It corresponds to Meiji 39 (明治39年) in the Japanese calendar.

== Incumbents ==
- Emperor: Emperor Meiji
- Prime Minister:
  - Katsura Tarō (until January 8)
  - Saionji Kinmochi (from January 8)

=== Governors ===
- Aichi Prefecture: Masaaki Nomura
- Akita Prefecture: Takejiro Yukaji then Seino Chotarno then Chuji Shimooka
- Aomori Prefecture: Shotaro Nishizawa
- Ehime Prefecture: Kensuke Ando
- Fukui Prefecture: Suke Sakamoto
- Fukushima Prefecture: Arita Yoshisuke
- Gifu Prefecture: Sadakichi Usu
- Gunma Prefecture: Yoshimi Teru then Arita Yoshisuke
- Hiroshima Prefecture: Yamada Shunzō
- Ibaraki Prefecture: Teru Terahara
- Iwate Prefecture: Sokkichi Oshikawa
- Kagawa Prefecture: Motohiro Onoda
- Kochi Prefecture: Munakata Tadashi
- Kumamoto Prefecture: Egi Kazuyuki
- Kyoto Prefecture: Baron Shoichi Omori
- Mie Prefecture: Lord Arimitsu Hideyoshi
- Miyagi Prefecture: Kamei Ezaburo
- Miyazaki Prefecture: Toda Tsunetaro then Nagai Enjin
- Nagano Prefecture: Akira Oyama
- Niigata Prefecture: Hiroshi Abe
- Oita Prefecture: Hiroshi Abe
- Okinawa Prefecture: Shigeru Narahara
- Saga Prefecture: Fai Kagawa
- Saitama Prefecture: Marquis Okubo Toshi Takeshi
- Shiga Prefecture: Sada Suzuki
- Shiname Prefecture: Matsunaga Takeyoshi
- Tochigi Prefecture: Kubota Kiyochika then .....
- Tokushima Prefecture: Saburo Iwao
- Tokyo: Baron Sangay Takatomi
- Toyama Prefecture: Shinhare Kawakami
- Yamagata Prefecture: Tanaka Takamichi then Mabuchi Eitaro
- Yamanashi Prefecture: Takeda Chiyosaburo

== Events ==
- January 12 – Sogi Electronic Company, as predecessor of Asahi Kasei was founded in Isa region, Kagoshima Prefecture.
- April 1 – A sports goods brand Mizuno, as predecessor name was Mizuno Sports Goods was founded.

== Births ==
- March 31 – Sin-Itiro Tomonaga, physicist (d. 1979)
- June 28 – Yoshimi Ueda, basketball player and administrator (d. 1996)
- July 16 – Ichimaru, recording artist and geisha (d. 1997)
- September 18 – Matsuo Kishi, film critic and filmmaker (d. 1985)
- October 19 – Bandō Mitsugorō VIII, kabuki actor (d. 1975)
- October 20 – Ango Sakaguchi, author (d. 1955)
- October 27 – Kazuo Ohno, Butoh dancer (d. 2010)
- November 13 – Osamu Takizawa, actor (d. 2000)
- November 17 – Soichiro Honda, founder of Honda Motor Company (d. 1991)

== Deaths ==
- January 15 – Narasaki Ryō, wife of Sakamoto Ryōma (b. 1841)
- July 23 – Kodama Gentarō, general and politician (b. 1852)
- November 15 – Yamamoto Hōsui, artist (b. 1850)
