= 1905 in Japan =

- Decades: 1880s; 1890s; 1900s; 1910s; 1920s
- See also: Other events of 1905; History of Japan; Timeline; Years

Events in the year 1905 in Japan. It corresponds to Meiji 38 (明治38年) in the Japanese calendar.

== Incumbents ==
- Emperor: Emperor Meiji
- Prime Minister: Katsura Tarō

=== Governors ===
- Aichi Prefecture: Masaaki Nomura
- Akita Prefecture: Oka Kishichiro Itami then Takejiro Yukaji
- Aomori Prefecture: Shotaro Nishizawa
- Ehime Prefecture: Kensuke Ando
- Fukui Prefecture: Suke Sakamoto
- Fukushima Prefecture: Arita Yoshisuke
- Gifu Prefecture: Kawaji Toshikyo
- Gunma Prefecture: Yoshimi Teru
- Hiroshima Prefecture: Yamada Shunzō
- Ibaraki Prefecture: Teru Terahara
- Iwate Prefecture: Sokkichi Oshikawa
- Kagawa Prefecture: Motohiro Onoda
- Kochi Prefecture: Munakata Tadashi
- Kumamoto Prefecture: Egi Kazuyuki
- Kyoto Prefecture: Baron Shoichi Omori
- Mie Prefecture: Lord Arimitsu Hideyoshi
- Miyagi Prefecture: Kamei Ezaburo
- Miyazaki Prefecture: Toda Tsunetaro
- Nagano Prefecture: Seki Kiyohide then Akira Oyama
- Niigata Prefecture: Hiroshi Abe
- Oita Prefecture: Ogura Hisashi
- Okinawa Prefecture: Shigeru Narahara
- Saga Prefecture: Fai Kagawa
- Saitama Prefecture: Marquis Okubo Toshi Takeshi
- Shiga Prefecture: Sada Suzuki
- Shiname Prefecture: Matsunaga Takeyoshi
- Tochigi Prefecture: Kubota Kiyochika
- Tokushima Prefecture: Saburo Iwao
- Tokyo: Baron Sangay Takatomi
- Toyama Prefecture: Rika Ryusuke then Shinhare Kawakami
- Yamagata Prefecture: Tanaka Takamichi
- Yamanashi Prefecture: Takeda Chiyosaburo

== Events ==
- January 2: The Russian Army surrenders at Port Arthur in China.
- January 25–29: Battle of Sandepu
- February 20-March 10: Battle of Mukden
- April 1: Japan–Korea Agreement of April 1905
- May 27–28: Battle of Tsushima
- August 13: Japan–Korea Agreement of August 1905
- September 1: Kobe Steel has founded.
- September 5: Treaty of Portsmouth signed, ending Russo-Japanese War
  - Hibiya Incendiary Incident
- November 17: Japan–Korea Treaty of 1905
- Wolves become extinct in Japan.

== Births ==
- January 3 – Nobuhito, Prince Takamatsu (d. 1987)
- January 5 – Tamako Kataoka, artist (d. 2008)
- January 14 – Takeo Fukuda, Prime Minister of Japan (d. 1995)
- January 15 – Kamatari Fujiwara, actor (d. 1985)
- March 12 – Takashi Shimura, actor (d. 1982)
- April 1 – Asaichi Isobe, army officer (d. 1937)
- May 14 – Kunio Maekawa, architect (d. 1986)
- May 28 – Sada Abe, geisha and prostitute (d. 1970?)
- June 25 – Jun'ichi Yoda, poet (d. 1997)
- July 2 – Tatsuzō Ishikawa, writer (d. 1985)
- July 25 – Masazō Nonaka, supercentenarian (d. 2019)
- August 20 – Mikio Naruse, filmmaker (d. 1969)
- October 2 – Fumiko Enchi, writer (d. 1986)
- October 3 – Taiko Hirabayashi, writer (d. 1972)
- November 15 – Tamiki Hara, writer (d. 1951)

== Deaths ==
- January 31 – Soejima Taneomi, diplomat and statesman (b. 1828)
- April 13 – Taguchi Ukichi, historian and economist (b. 1855)
