= Zawachin =

Japanese idol and makeup artist

Zawachin さわちん
- Born: Kaori Ozawa (小澤 かおり); August 16, 1992 (age 33); Ōta, Gunma, Japan
- Occupations: Idol, television personality
- Years active: 2011–present
- Website: www.zawachin.com

Kaori Ozawa (小澤 かおり, Ozawa Kaori; born August 16, 1992 in Ota, Gunma, Japan), better known by her stage name Zawachin (ざわちん), is a Japanese idol, make-up artist and television personality who was originally known for her impersonation of Tomomi Itano of AKB48. She has 400,000 followers on her official blog.

However, she has been highly criticized by public on all social media forums owing to her unethical remarks and questionable acts. On 18 September 2017, Zawachin posted four images of mesmerizing views of Tokyo DisneySea on her blog with a comment. Shortly, it became clear that the images were simply taken from a Twitter post done by an amateur photographer. The comment posted on her blog was also exactly the same with the photographer's original comment. Moreover, Zawachin erased the copyright information of the photographer that was put on one of the images.

== Background ==
Ozawa was born to a Filipino mother and Japanese father. Zawachin became popular for her monomane meiku (imitation make-up) by using her own face and transform into different celebrities and famous artists. She's known for her signature pink mask (a must have item when doing a monomane make-up). She then released her own book called “Zawachin Make Magic”. She released her debut single ‘Mada Minu Sekai’ (“Yet Unseen World”).
