= Kazutaka Murase =

Japanese footballer

Kazutaka Murase 村瀬 和隆
Personal information
- Full name: Kazutaka Murase
- Date of birth: September 11, 1985 (age 41)
- Place of birth: Kusatsu, Shiga, Japan
- Height: 1.76 m (5 ft 9 1/2 in)
- Position: Forward

Youth career
- 2001–2003: Moriyama Kita High School

Senior career*
Years	Team	Apps	(Gls)
2004–2006	Vissel Kobe	24	(1)
2007–2008	MIO Biwako Kusatsu	24	(10)
2009–2011	Fukushima United FC	25	(22)
Total		73	(33)
- * Club domestic league appearances and goals

Kazutaka Murase (村瀬 和隆, Murase Kazutaka; born September 11, 1985) is a former Japanese football player.

== Career statistics ==
Appearances and goals by club, season and competition
Club	Season	League			Emperor's Cup		J.League Cup		Total	
Club	Season	Division	Apps	Goals	Apps	Goals	Apps	Goals	Apps	Goals
Vissel Kobe	2004	J1 League	4	0	0	0	1	0	5	0
Vissel Kobe	2005	J1 League	5	0	0	0	1	0	6	0
Vissel Kobe	2006	J2 League	15	1	0	0	—		15	1
Career total			24	1	0	0	2	0	26	1
