= Miwa Asao =

Japanese beach volleyball player (born 1986)

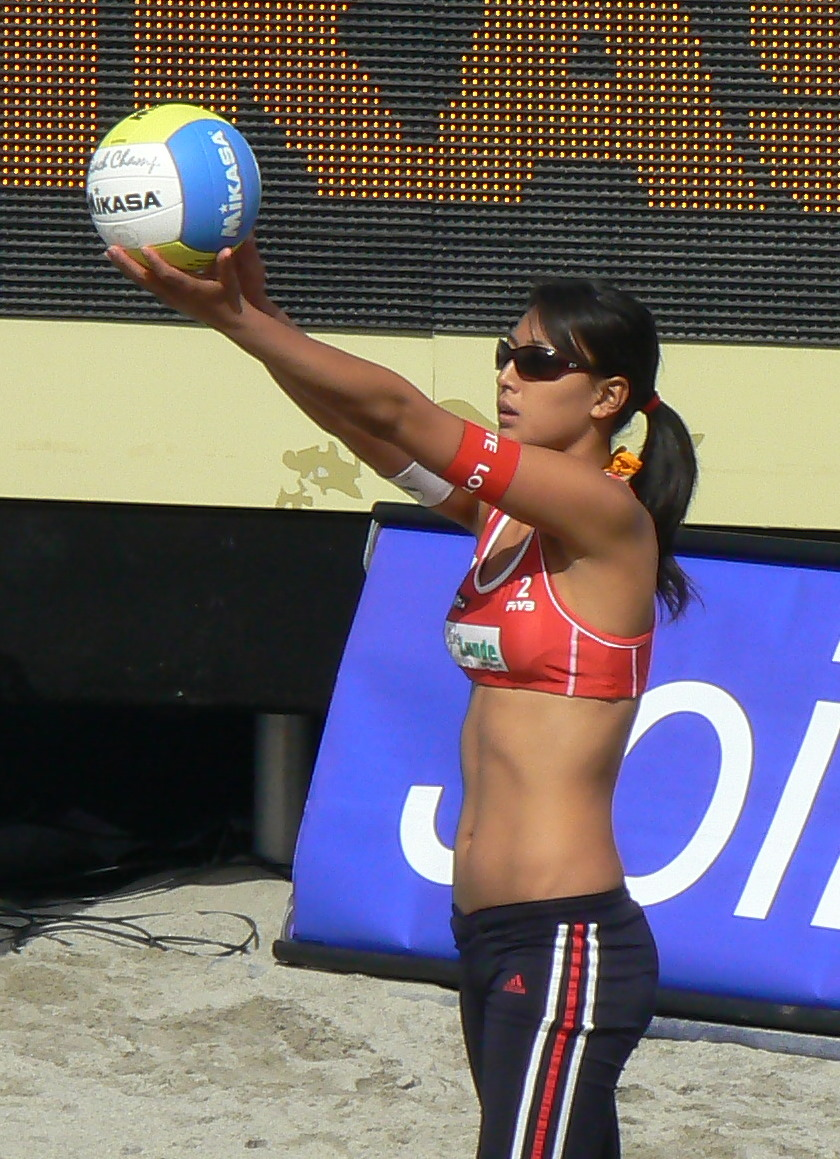
- Asao competing in Norway in 2008

Personal information
- Full name: Miwa Asao
- Born: 2 February 1986 (age 40); Suzuka, Mie, Japan
- Height: 1.72 m (5 ft 8 in)
- Weight: 54 kg (119 lb)

Beach volleyball information

Current teammate
Teammate
Ayumi Kusano

Miwa Asao (浅尾 美和, Asao Miwa; born 2 February 1986 in Suzuka, Mie) is a female Japanese beach volleyball player. Referred to in media reports as the "pixie of beach volleyball" or simply "pixie of the beach" for her good looks, Asao helped to popularize beach volleyball in Japan. She became a national celebrity from the many articles written on her in Japanese magazines and newspapers, and through her numerous appearances on television.

== Education ==
Asao attended Mie Prefecture Tatsutsu Commercial High School.

== Career ==
After graduating from high school, she signed a contract with artist Kawahe Shunichi to develop her career as a beach volleyball player and model.

She started her volleyball career in 2000 and officially became a beach volleyball player in 2004.
