= Chizuko Mifune =

Japanese clairvoyant

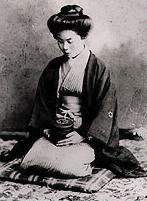

Chizuko Mifune (御船 千鶴子, Mifune Chizuko, 17 July 1886 – 19 January 1911) was a self-proclaimed clairvoyant during the late Meiji period in Japan.

== Early years ==
Mifune was born in Kumamoto Prefecture into a family of folk medicine practitioners. It has been stated that she was deeply religious. In 1908, at the age of 22, she married an army lieutenant and moved in with her parents-in-law. She was introduced to hypnosis by her brother-in-law, and allegedly developed her powers at the age of 24 by practicing breathing and meditation exercises.

== Fukurai ==
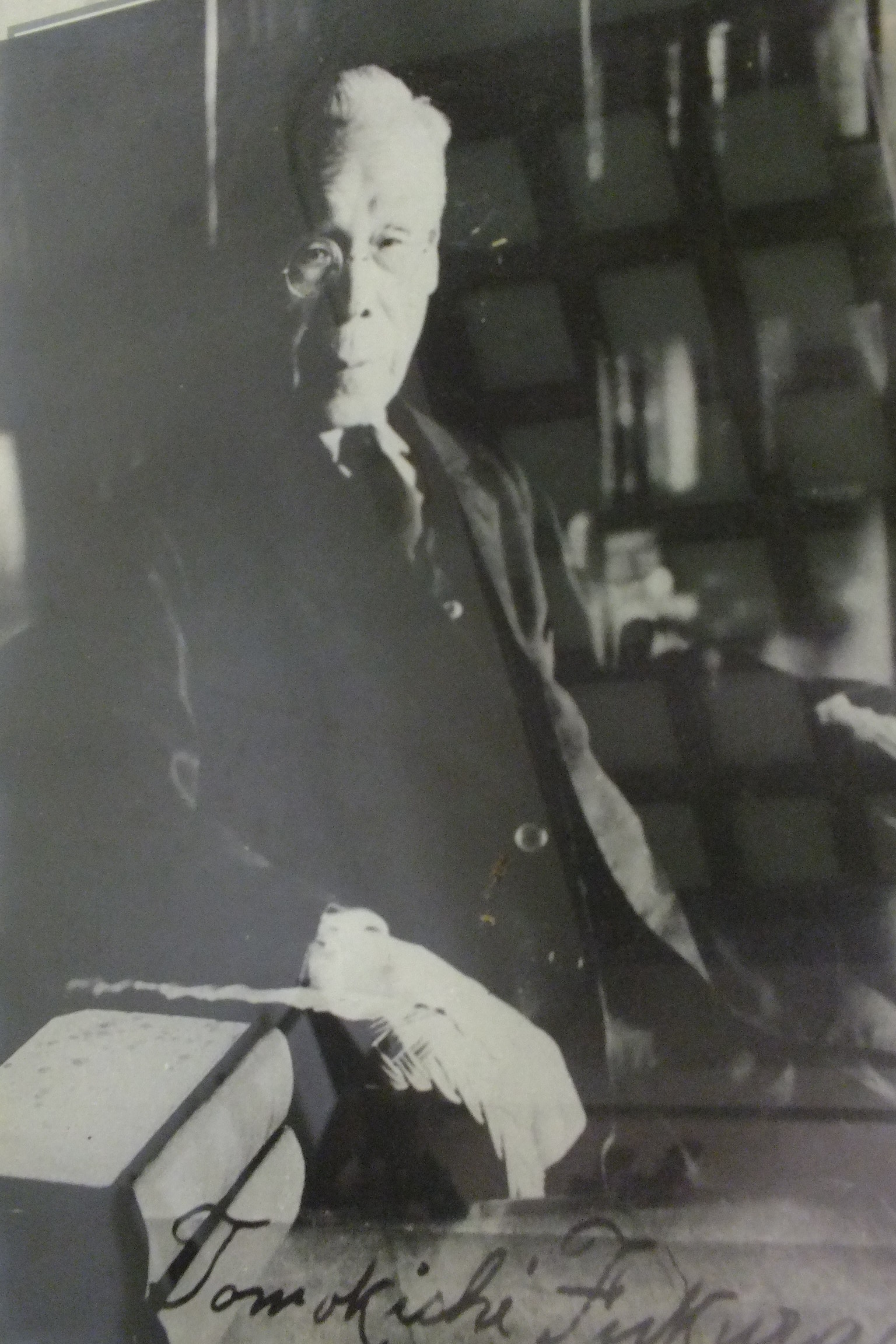
Tomokichi Fukurai

Tomokichi Fukurai, Assistant Professor of Psychology at the University of Tokyo, was deeply interested in the supernatural and desired to validate extra-sensory perception. Fukarai's supernatural interests were heavily criticized by his colleagues, but he was convinced Mifune's powers were genuine when he privately tested her in April 1910. A second, public test was conducted by Tokyo University president Baron Yamakawa Kenjirō on 15 September 1910. She appeared to read messages written inside hidden envelopes, however, when these messages turned out to be not from Yamakawa but from Fukurai, she was widely seen as a charlatan and heavily criticized by the press.

A modern researcher, Rodger Anderson has noted that the experiments were not properly controlled as Mifune "was often left alone with the test envelope, or insisted on turning her back to witnesses when attempting to psychically probe its contents."

== Death ==
Four months later, on 19 January 1911, Mifune committed suicide at the age of 24 by ingesting poison.

== Influences ==
Japanese horror filmmakers of Premonition and Ring reportedly used Mifune as the inspiration behind the character Shizuko Yamamura, the mother of Ring antagonist Sadako Yamamura.
