= Yutaka Otsuka =

Japanese baseball player (born 1987)

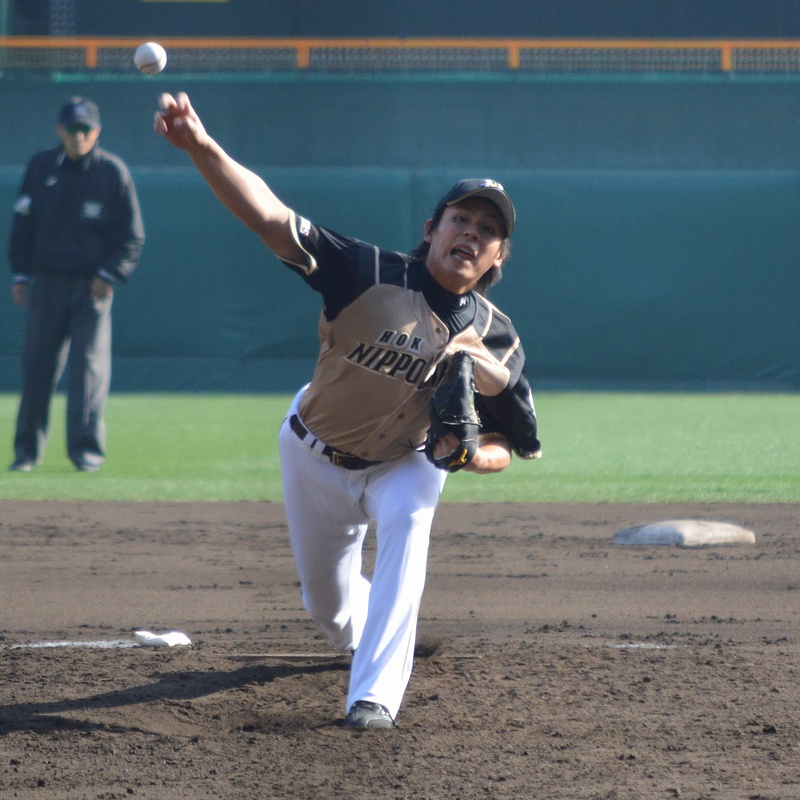
- Otsuka with the Hokkaido Nippon Ham Fighters
- Pitcher
- Born: December 20, 1987 (age 38); Tokyo, Japan
- Bats: Right Throws: Right

debut
- 2011, for the Hokkaido Nippon-Ham Fighters

Career statistics (through 2016 season)
- Win–loss record: 1–1
- ERA: 5.40
- Strikeouts: 20
- Stats at Baseball Reference

Teams
- Hokkaido Nippon-Ham Fighters (2010–2016)

Yutaka Otsuka (大塚 豊, Ōtsuka Yutaka) is a Japanese professional baseball pitcher. He was born on December 20, 1987, in Tokyo, Japan. He is currently playing for the Hokkaido Nippon-Ham Fighters of the NPB.
