= Hiroyuki Terada =

Japanese chef (born 1968)

- Born: 29 January 1968 (age 58)
- Culinary career
- Cooking style: Japanese / Sushi

Hiroyuki Terada (寺田弘行, Terada Hiroyuki; born 29 January 1968) is a Japanese chef in Florida, specializing in American-style rolls. He has a large social media following with over 2 million subscribers on YouTube which he garnered from hosting multiple segments on cooking. Terada sometimes uses budget ingredients including Big Macs and ingredients from Walmart. Terada currently holds the Guinness World record on most number of carrots sliced blindfolded in 30 seconds.

== Career ==
Terada first learned to cook from his father at the age of 10. From 1987 to 1989 he attended RKC Culinary School in Kōchi, Japan. He was known for his speed with the knife and attention to detail. After graduating he served under Master Chef Kondo from 1988 to 1991 at Yuzuan, a casual family restaurant in Nankoku, Kōchi Prefecture. He earned the title of master sushi chef after being promoted to head sushi chef there. Terada moved to the United States in September 1991. .

Terada has a large fan base on social media from hosting segments such as "Will It Sushi" on his YouTube channel "Diaries of a Master Sushi Chef". By 2015 Terada had built up an online following with over 40 million views on his channel. He turned a Big Mac and fries into sushi. In 2016, he turned donuts from Dunkin' Donuts and KFC chicken into sushi. In 2017, he broke the Guinness record of most sliced carrots blindfolded in 30 seconds. He cut 88 slices of carrots, 50 more than the previous record. In 2018, Terada had over 1 million subscribers on YouTube and over 100 million views. By 2019, he had over 1.5 million subscribers. By 2022, August 8, he had over 2 million subscribers.
