= Junkurō Nakamura =

Japanese politician

- 中村 純九郎
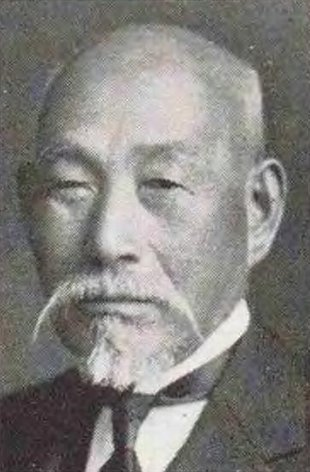

Member of the House of Peers
- In office 2 June 1920 – 2 May 1947 Nominated by the Emperor

12th Director-General of the Hokkaidō Agency
- In office 27 February 1913 – 21 April 1914
- Monarch: Taishō
- Preceded by: Yamanouchi Ichiji
- Succeeded by: Hiromichi Nishikubo

Governor of Hiroshima Prefecture
- In office 28 March 1912 – 27 February 1913
- Monarchs: Meiji; Taishō
- Preceded by: Tadashi Munakata
- Succeeded by: Terada Yushi

Governor of Fukui Prefecture
- In office 27 December 1907 – 28 March 1912
- Monarch: Meiji
- Preceded by: Sakamoto Sennosuke
- Succeeded by: Ikematsu Tokikazu

Personal details
- Born: 7 August 1853 Hizen Province, Japan
- Died: 18 December 1947 (aged 94)
- Parent: Nakamura Kizōta (father)

Junkurō Nakamura (中村 純九郎, Nakamura Junkurō; 7 August 1853 – 18 December 1947) was a Japanese politician, born in Hizen Province, who served as governor of Fukui Prefecture (1907–1912), Hiroshima Prefecture from March 1912 to February 1913 and 12th Director-General of the Hokkaido Agency (1913–1914).

Nakamura also served with the Office of the Governor-General of Taiwan, and as a member of the House of Peers from 1920 to 1947.

== Early life ==
Nakamura Junkurō was born in 1853 to Nakamura Kizōta a samurai, in Hizen (modern-day Saga Prefecture). He studied Chinese learning at the Saga Kōdōkan under Kihara Takatada and Soejima Taneomi, before going to Tokyo, where he studied English for two years at Kyōkan Gijuku. In 1876, he became a law student and later entered government service.

Preceded by Suke Sakamoto	Governor of Fukui Prefecture; 1907-1912	Succeeded by Tokiwa Ikematsu
Preceded by Tadashi Munakata	Governor of Hiroshima Prefecture; 1912–1913	Succeeded by Terada Yushi
