= Yukio Kurita =

Japanese politician (1930–2024)

- 栗田幸雄

Governor of Fukui Prefecture
- In office 23 April 1987 – 22 April 2003
- Monarchs: Hirohito; Akihito
- Preceded by: Heidayū Nakagawa
- Succeeded by: Issei Nishikawa

Personal details
- Born: 6 April 1930 Sabae, Fukui, Japan
- Died: 17 May 2024 (aged 94) Fukui, Japan
- Party: Independent
- Education: Graduate Schools for Law and Politics and Faculty of Law, University of Tokyo

Yukio Kurita (Japanese: 栗田幸雄 Kurita Yukio; 6 April 1930 – 17 May 2024) was a Japanese politician. An independent, he served as governor of Fukui Prefecture from 1987 to 2003.

Kurita died in Fukui on 17 May 2024, at the age of 94.
