= Tadashi Munakata =

Japanese politician

- 宗像 政
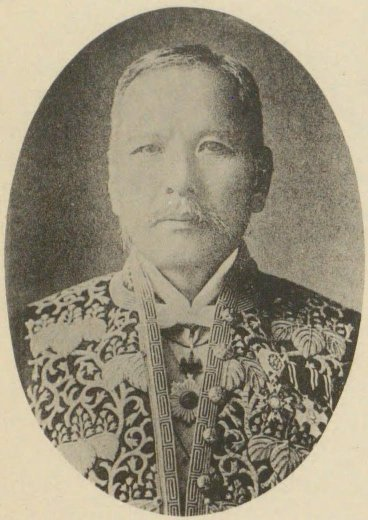

Member of the House of Peers
- In office 26 December 1917 – 7 February 1918 Nominated by the Emperor

Member of the House of Representatives
- In office 25 March 1915 – 25 January 1917
- Preceded by: Takada Akira
- Succeeded by: Ijima Yoshio
- Constituency: Kumamoto Counties
- In office 1 September 1894 – 25 December 1897
- Preceded by: Shibuya Rei
- Succeeded by: Nagayasu Matsuoka
- Constituency: Kumamoto 5th
Gubernatorial offices
Governor of Tokyo
In office 30 December 1912 – 21 April 1914
Monarch	Taishō
Preceded by	Hiroshi Abe
Succeeded by	Kiyochika Kubota
Governor of Kumamoto Prefecture
In office 28 March 1912 – 30 December 1912
Monarchs	Meiji; Taishō
Preceded by	Kawaji Toshiatsu
Succeeded by	Kamiyama Mitsunoshin
Governor of Hiroshima Prefecture
In office 11 January 1907 – 28 March 1912
Monarch	Meiji
Preceded by	Yamada Shunzō
Succeeded by	Junkurō Nakamura
Governor of Kōchi Prefecture
In office 29 June 1903 – 11 January 1907
Monarch	Meiji
Preceded by	Watanabe Yuzuru
Succeeded by	Suzuki Sadanao
Governor of Miyagi Prefecture
In office 8 February 1902 – 21 January 1903
Monarch	Meiji
Preceded by	Onoda Motohiro
Succeeded by	Tanabe Teruzane
Governor of Fukui Prefecture
In office 17 April 1901 – 8 February 1902
Monarch	Meiji
Preceded by	Iwao Saburō
Succeeded by	Sakamoto Sannosuke
Governor of Aomori Prefecture
In office 21 January 1899 – 17 April 1901
Monarch	Meiji
Preceded by	Shuichirō Kōno
Succeeded by	Yamanouchi Kazuji
Governor of Saitama Prefecture
In office 7 April 1897 – 26 January 1898
Monarch	Meiji
Preceded by	Senge Takatomi
Succeeded by	Hagiwara Hiroe

Personal details
- Born: 30 January 1854
- Died: 7 February 1918 (aged 64)
- Party: Rikken Seiyūkai (1914–1917)
- Other political affiliations: Rikken Kakushintō (1894)

Tadashi Munakata (宗像 政, Munakata Tadashi; 30 January 1854 – 7 February 1918) was a Japanese politician who served as governor of Saitama Prefecture (1897–1898), Governor of Aomori Prefecture (1899–1901), Fukui Prefecture (1901–1902), Miyagi Prefecture (1902–1903), Kōchi Prefecture (1903–1907), Hiroshima Prefecture from 1907 to 1912 and Kumamoto Prefecture in 1912.
