= Toshitami Kaihara =

Japanese politician

- 貝原 俊民

Governor of Hyōgo Prefecture
- In office 24 November 1986 – 31 July 2001
- Monarchs: Hirohito; Akihito
- Preceded by: Tokitada Sakai
- Succeeded by: Toshizō Ido

Personal details
- Born: 24 August 1933 Takeo, Saga, Japan
- Died: 13 November 2014 (aged 81) Kobe, Hyōgo, Japan
- Party: Independent
- Education: University of Tokyo

Toshitami Kaihara (24 August 1933 – 13 November 2014) became a Vice Governor in 1970 and Governor of Hyōgo Prefecture in 1986, a position he held for four terms over 15 years. Prior to that he was an official at the Ministry of Home Affairs. He held a place in the government for over two decades. He took an active role in the Hyogo earthquake aftermath, presiding over the Hyogo Earthquake Memorial 21st Century Research Institute. He was also Director General of the Environment Award.
