= Yawara Hata =

Japanese politician (1910–1996)

- 畑 和

Governor of Saitama Prefecture
- In office 13 July 1972 – 12 July 1992
- Monarchs: Hirohito; Akihito
- Preceded by: Hiroshi Kurihara
- Succeeded by: Yoshihiko Tsuchiya

Member of the House of Representatives
- In office 21 November 1960 – 2 July 1972
- Preceded by: Masao Kashiwa
- Succeeded by: Tōkichi Hirata
- Constituency: Saitama 1st

Personal details
- Born: 29 September 1910 Kazo, Saitama, Japan
- Died: 26 January 1996 (aged 85)
- Party: Socialist
- Education: Tokyo Imperial University

Yawara Hata (畑和, Hata Yawara; 29 September 1910 – 26 January 1996) was a Japanese politician, who served as a member of the House of Representatives and a governor of Saitama Prefecture. In 1993 he received the highest distinction of the Scout Association of Japan, the Golden Pheasant Award.
