= Morihiko Hiramatsu =

Japanese politician

- 平松 守彦

Governor of Ōita Prefecture
- In office 28 April 1979 – 27 April 2003
- Monarchs: Hirohito; Akihito
- Preceded by: Masaru Taki
- Succeeded by: Katsusada Hirose

Personal details
- Born: 12 March 1924 Ōita City, Ōita, Japan
- Died: 21 August 2016 (aged 92) Ōita City, Ōita, Japan
- Education: University of Tokyo
- Profession: Lawyer, politician

Morihiko Hiramatsu (平松 守彦, Hiramatsu Morihiko; 12 March 1924 – 21 August 2016) was a Japanese politician who was governor of Ōita Prefecture from April 1979 to April 2003. He is best known for initiating the One Village One Product movement in the prefecture, which was later followed by various other countries.

== Early life ==
Hiramatsu was born in Ōita City and studied in local schools. He served in the Imperial Japanese Navy and later graduated in law from Tokyo University in 1949. He then joined the Ministry of International Trade and Industry (MITI) where he worked on various regulations being formed for the emerging Japanese electronics industry.

== Governor of Oita ==
In 1975, he became vice-governor of Oita Prefecture and then in 1979 was elected as governor. He was re-elected on five consecutive occasions and stayed in the post until 2003.

As the governor of Oita Prefecture, Hiramatsu initiated the One Village One Product movement (OVOP) for regional development. Unique productions and specialized human resource development would take place in each village thus boosting the standard of living at the grass root levels. The movement stressed growing through community support rather than government policies and subsidies. In 1979, he launched technological industries in the area, focusing on those needing air cargo services. This boosted foreign investments in the semiconductor and electronics industry. Research and development programs were also set up at Oita University.

Other developing countries followed suit. OVOP was largely followed in rural areas of China where agriculture was prominent source of livelihood. China became the first country to adopt Hiramatsu's scheme and various provinces, especially in Jiangsu province where it accelerated economic development. More than 30 countries and regions followed suit after China. Thailand's Prime Minister Thaksin Shinawatra also initiated a similar program, One Tambon One Product in 2001. In 2014, Indian Prime Minister Narendra Modi proposed similar project called One Model Village where Members of Parliament would adopt and develop a village of their constituency.

To boost the local development in Beppu City, which was experiencing an economic turndown due to fewer tourists in the 1990s, Hiramatsu proposed the establishment of Ritsumeikan Asia Pacific University in 2000. The 2002 FIFA World Cup matches were held at Ōita Bank Dome after an active lobbying campaign on his behalf. Hiramatsu supported the reorganization of Japan into states, which would be formed by combining neighbouring prefectures.

== Honours ==
Hiramatsu received the Philippine Ramon Magsaysay Award in the Government Service category in 1995. He dedicated the award to the people of Oita prefecture who were together working towards regional revitalization. He was made a Knight of the Dutch Order of Orange-Nassau and Commander of the Portuguese Order of Prince Henry in 2001. He was presented with the Grand Cordon of the Order of the Rising Sun in 2004.

The Chinese government presented him with the Friendship Award in 2002. In 2009, he was listed in the internet poll of Top 10 International Friends of China organized by the China Radio International for "making exceptional contributions to the country in the past 100 years."

== Death ==
He died on 21 August 2016, at the age of 92, and his death was announced by his family two days later.
