= Reiji Suzuki =

Japanese politician (1928–2022)

- 鈴木 礼治

Governor of Aichi Prefecture
- In office 15 February 1983 – 14 February 1999
- Monarchs: Hirohito; Akihito
- Preceded by: Yoshiaki Nakaya
- Succeeded by: Masaaki Kanda

Personal details
- Born: 4 December 1928 Yokkaichi, Mie, Japan
- Died: 15 August 2022 (aged 93) Nagoya, Aichi, Japan
- Party: Independent
- Education: Nagoya University

Reiji Suzuki (鈴木 礼治, Suzuki Reiji; 4 December 1928 – 15 August 2022) was a Japanese politician. He served as governor of Aichi Prefecture from 1983 to 1999. He was born in Mie Prefecture. He graduated from Nagoya University. He was a recipient of the Order of the Sacred Treasure.

Preceded by Yoshiaki Nakaya	Governor of Aichi Prefecture; 1983–1999	Succeeded by Masaaki Kanda
