= Toranosuke Takeshita =

Japanese politician (1924–2008)

- 竹下 虎之助

Governor of Hiroshima Prefecture
- In office 29 November 1981 – 28 November 1993
- Monarchs: Hirohito; Akihito
- Preceded by: Hiroshi Miyazawa
- Succeeded by: Yūzan Fujita

Personal details
- Born: 6 August 1924
- Died: 16 December 2008 (aged 84) Minami-ku, Hiroshima, Japan
- Education: Kyoto University

Toranosuke Takeshita (竹下 虎之助, Takeshita Toranosuke; 6 August 1924 – 16 December 2008) was the Governor of Hiroshima Prefecture from 1981 to 1993.

In August 1990, while participating in a symposium in Hiroshima, he publicly called on Soviet leader Mikhail Gorbachev to visit the city.

Preceded by Hiroshi Miyazawa	Governor of Hiroshima Prefecture; 1981–1993	Succeeded by Yūzan Fujita
