= List of governors of Aomori Prefecture =

Governor of Aomori Prefecture
- Emblem of Aomori Prefecture
- Incumbent; Sōichirō Miyashita since 29 June 2023
- Inaugural holder: Noda Hiromichi
- Formation: 1871
- Website: Governor's website

The governor of Aomori Prefecture (青森県知事, Aomori kenchiji) is the head of the local government in Aomori Prefecture.

== List of governors of Aomori Prefecture ==
=== Appointed ===
Name	Image	Term start	Residence
Noda Hiromichi		5 September 1871	Kumamoto Prefecture
Shigeyoshi Hishida		7 November 1871	Gifu Prefecture
Masaomi Kitadai		20 August 1873	Kōchi Prefecture
Tanetoku Ikeda		11 February 1874	Hiroshima Prefecture
Yoshikan Shiotani		7 November 1874	Yamagata Prefecture
Masaomi Kitadai (reelection)		17 August 1876	Kōchi Prefecture
Hidenori Yamada		22 August 1876	Kumamoto Prefecture
Kanenori Goda		14 January 1882	Kagoshima Prefecture
Kususei Fukushima		22 December 1883	Saga Prefecture
Nabeshima Miki		24 July 1886	Saga Prefecture
Tamasa Sawa		26 December 1889	Miyagi Prefecture
Naomasa Park		12 August 1896	Nagasaki Prefecture
Shuichiro Kono		13 November 1897	Kagoshima Prefecture
Tadashi Munakata		21 Janusury 1899	Kumamoto Prefecture
Kazuji Yamauchi		17 April 1901	Kagoshima Prefecture
Katsutaro Inuzuka		26 April 1904	Yamagata Prefecture
Shotaro Nishizawa		17 November 1904	Nagano Prefecture
Takeda Chiyosaburo		12 June 1908	Fukuoka Prefecture
Takeo Tanaka		1 June 1913	Tokyo Prefecture
Kohama Matsujiro		28 April 1914	Kagoshima Prefecture
Kawamura Takeji		17 January 1917	Akita Prefecture
Sawada Ushimaro		3 October 1918	Kōchi Prefecture
Hidehiko Michioka		18 April 1919	Kagoshima Prefecture
Harutoshi Kahei		9 March 1921	Okayama Prefecture
Yujiro Ozaki		28 September 1921	Hyōgo Prefecture
Baba Kazue		25 October 1923	Kumamoto Prefecture
Ogata Yuichiro		6 June 1924	Kumamoto Prefecture
Matsubara Gonshiro		24 June 1924	Kagawa Prefecture
Ryusaku Endo		16 September 1925	Saitama Prefecture
Koyanagi Makie		28 September 1926	Niigata Prefecture
Jiro Morioka		27 May 1927	Nara Prefecture
Tetsuzo Yoshimura		7 November 1927	Tottori Prefecture
Yujiro Shinjo		30 January 1929	Kyoto Prefecture
Mitsuo Hirai		5 July 1929	Kumamoto Prefecture
Masao Moriya		26 August 1930	Kumamoto Prefecture
Teizaburo Miyamoto		18 December 1931	Miyagi Prefecture
Yasunobu Taku		28 June 1932	Saga Prefecture
Mitsumasa Kobayashi		11 August 1934	Tochigi Prefecture
Masayoshi Ogawa		16 October 1936	Tochigi Prefecture
Minoru Suzuki		1 March 1939	Shizuoka Prefecture
Seiichi Ueda		24 July 1940	Ishikawa Prefecture
Shunsuke Yamada		9 January 1942	Hyōgo Prefecture
Kohei Utsunomiya		31 March 1943	Ehime Prefecture
Hiroo Ohshima		1 August 1944	Ishikawa Prefecture
Motohiko Kanai		21 April 1945	Hyōgo Prefecture
Renji Ohno		25 January 1946	Chiba Prefecture
Fuyuo Hayasaka		11 March 1947	Miyagi Prefecture

=== Elected ===
Name	Image	Term start	Terms served	Residence	Political Party
Bunji Tsushima		12 April 1947	3	Kanagi, Aomori	Democratic Party
Iwao Yamazaki		20 July 1956	2	Kuon, Hokkaido	LDP
Toshikichi Takeuchi		2 March 1963	4	Izume, Hokkaido	LDP
Masaya Kitamura		26 February 1979	4	Misawa, Aomori	LDP
Morio Kimura		26 February 1995	3	Fujisaki, Aomori	Independent
Shingo Mimura		29 June 2003	5	Momoishi, Aomori	Independent
Sōichirō Miyashita		29 June 2023	Incumbent	Mutsu, Aomori	Independent
