= 2006 in Japan =

- Decades: 1980s; 1990s; 2000s; 2010s; 2020s
- See also: Other events of 2006: History of Japan; Timeline; Years

Events in the year 2006 in Japan.

== Incumbents ==
- Emperor: Akihito
- Prime Minister: Junichiro Koizumi (L–Kanagawa) to September 26 Shinzō Abe (L–Yamaguchi)
- Chief Cabinet Secretary: Shinzō Abe (L–Yamaguchi) to September 26 Yasuhisa Shiozaki (L–Ehime)
- Chief Justice of the Supreme Court: Akira Machida to October 15 Nirō Shimada from October 16
- President of the House of Representatives: Yōhei Kōno (L–Kanagawa)
- President of the House of Councillors: Chikage Ōgi (L–proportional)
- Diet sessions: 164th (regular, January 20 to June 18), 165th (extraordinary, September 26 to December 19)

=== Governors ===
- Aichi Prefecture: Masaaki Kanda
- Akita Prefecture: Sukeshiro Terata
- Aomori Prefecture: Shingo Mimura
- Chiba Prefecture: Akiko Dōmoto
- Ehime Prefecture: Moriyuki Kato
- Fukui Prefecture: Issei Nishikawa
- Fukuoka Prefecture: Wataru Asō
- Fukushima Prefecture:
  - until 28 September: Eisaku Satō
  - 28 September-12 November: Akira Kawate
  - starting 12 November: Yūhei Satō
- Gifu Prefecture: Hajime Furuta
- Gunma Prefecture: Hiroyuki Kodera
- Hiroshima Prefecture: Yūzan Fujita
- Hokkaido: Harumi Takahashi
- Hyogo Prefecture: Toshizō Ido
- Ibaraki Prefecture: Masaru Hashimoto
- Ishikawa Prefecture: Masanori Tanimoto
- Iwate Prefecture: Hiroya Masuda
- Kagawa Prefecture: Takeki Manabe
- Kagoshima Prefecture: Satoshi Mitazono
- Kanagawa Prefecture: Shigefumi Matsuzawa
- Kochi Prefecture: Daijiro Hashimoto
- Kumamoto Prefecture: Yoshiko Shiotani
- Kyoto Prefecture: Keiji Yamada
- Mie Prefecture: Akihiko Noro
- Miyagi Prefecture: Yoshihiro Murai
- Miyazaki Prefecture: Tadahiro Ando (until 5 December); Kayoko Saka (starting 5 December)
- Nagano Prefecture: Yasuo Tanaka (until 1 September); Jin Murai (starting 1 September)
- Nagasaki Prefecture: Genjirō Kaneko
- Nara Prefecture: Yoshiya Kakimoto
- Niigata Prefecture: Hirohiko Izumida
- Oita Prefecture: Katsusada Hirose
- Okayama Prefecture: Masahiro Ishii
- Okinawa Prefecture: Keiichi Inamine (until 10 December); Hirokazu Nakaima (starting 10 December)
- Osaka Prefecture: Fusae Ōta
- Saga Prefecture: Yasushi Furukawa
- Saitama Prefecture: Kiyoshi Ueda
- Shiga Prefecture: Yoshitsugu Kunimatsu (until 20 July); Yukiko Kada (starting 20 July)
- Shiname Prefecture: Nobuyoshi Sumita
- Shizuoka Prefecture: Yoshinobu Ishikawa
- Tochigi Prefecture: Tomikazu Fukuda
- Tokushima Prefecture: Kamon Iizumi
- Tokyo: Shintarō Ishihara
- Tottori Prefecture: Yoshihiro Katayama
- Toyama Prefecture: Takakazu Ishii
- Wakayama Prefecture: Yoshiki Kimura (until 2 December); Yoshinobu Nisaka (starting 17 December)
- Yamagata Prefecture: Hiroshi Saitō
- Yamaguchi Prefecture: Sekinari Nii
- Yamanashi Prefecture: Takahiko Yamamoto

== Events ==
=== January ===
- January 1 – The Stories of Ibis, a Japanese science-fiction light novel is published.
- January 16 – Tokyo prosecutors raid Livedoor for suspected violations of securities laws.
- January 18 – Following the Livedoor raid, the Tokyo Stock Exchange is overloaded with sell orders and is forced to stop trading.
- January 23 – Livedoor CEO Takafumi Horie and three other company officials are arrested and placed in detention.

=== February ===
- February 1 – Transit operators in the Kansai region introduce the PiTaPa contactless fare card system.
- February 6 – Construction Ministry officials cite Toyoko Inn for multiple violations of building codes and disability access laws.
- February 23 – Figure skater Shizuka Arakawa wins a gold medal in the Ladies' Singles at the 2006 Winter Olympics in Turin.

=== March ===
- March 3–5 – Asian round of the World Baseball Classic is held at the Tokyo Dome.
- March 4 – Softbank announces its intention to purchase the Japanese subsidiary of Vodafone.

=== April ===
- April 7 – Ichirō Ozawa is elected president of the Democratic Party of Japan.
- April 26 – Takahumi Horie is released from custody.
- April 26 – Hidetsugu Aneha is arrested for his role in the Structural Calculation Forgery Problem.

=== May ===
- May 1 – The new Corporations Act goes into effect, abolishing yugen kaisha and altering kabushiki kaisha.
- May 23 – Japanese foreign minister Taro Aso visits Qatar to meet with Chinese and South Korean diplomats.

=== June ===
- June – Minato Ward 2006 elevator accident, a 16-year-old student killed in Minato, Tokyo
- June 5 – Yoshiaki Murakami, manager of the Murakami Fund, is arrested for insider trading.
- June 15 – A cross-party organization of 135 Diet members led by Taku Yamasaki proposes a secular replacement for Yasukuni Shrine.

=== July ===
- July 14 – Bank of Japan abolishes the zero interest rate policy.
- July 20 – A memorandum from an Imperial Household Agency official is published in the Nihon Keizai Shimbun showing that Emperor Hirohito refused to visit Yasukuni Shrine after Class A war criminals were added to its rolls.

=== August ===
- August 9 – Beef imported from the United States goes on sale in Japan for the first time in months following a lengthy ban.
- August 14 – A blackout occurs throughout Tokyo, Chiba and Saitama during the morning rush hour after a barge-mounted crane disrupts a high-voltage line.

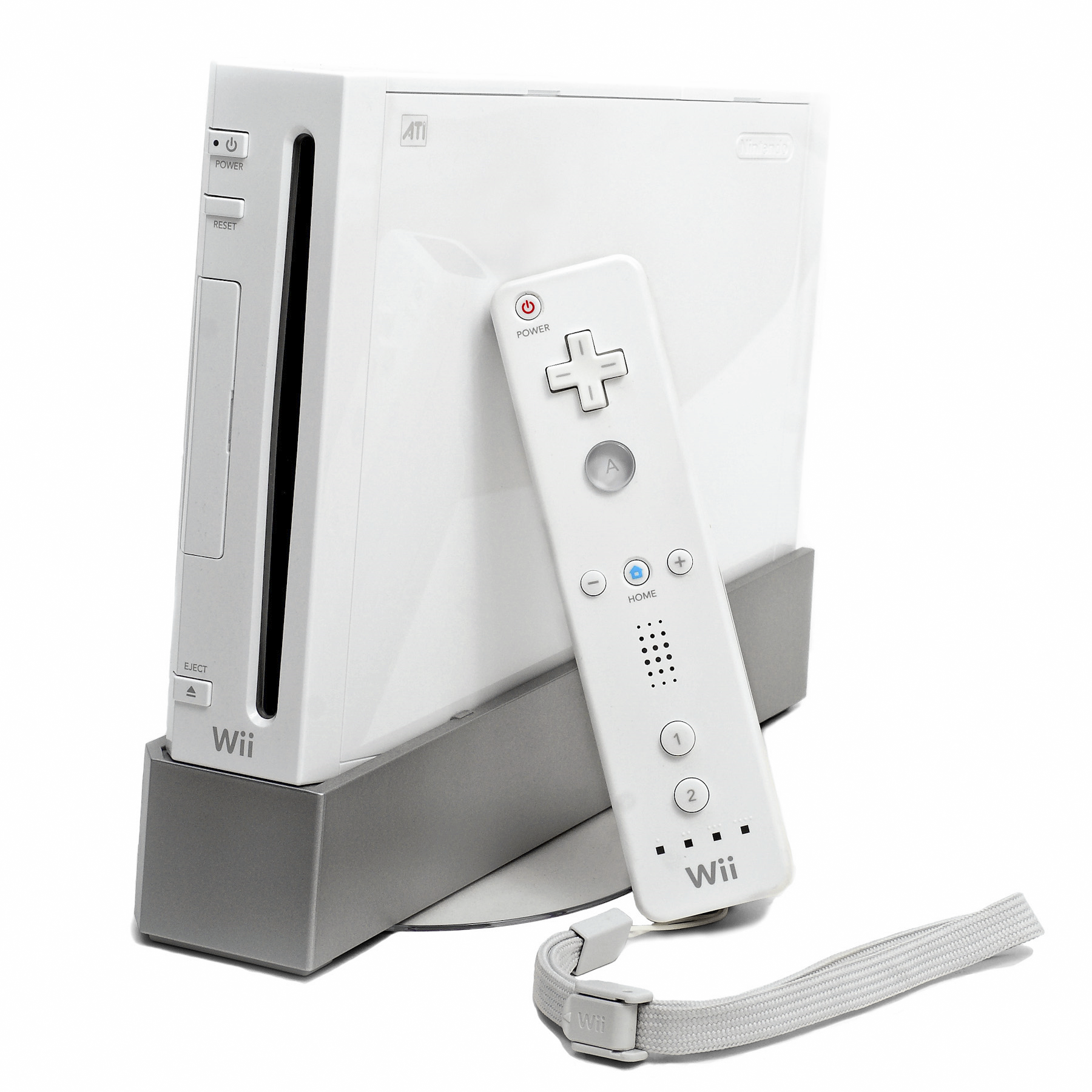
Nintendo's Wii

- August 15 – On the anniversary of the end of World War II, Koizumi makes his final visit to Yasukuni Shrine.
- August 16 – A fishing boat is fired upon after crossing into Russian-claimed waters off the east coast of Hokkaidō.

=== September ===
- September 22 – Junichiro Koizumi's term as president of the Liberal Democratic Party expires.

=== November ===
- November 7 – According to Fire and Disaster Management Agency official report, F3 class tornado hit in Saroma, eastern Hokkaido, nine persons were human fatalities and 23 persons were hurt.

=== December ===
- December 1 – A ceremony for the completion of nationwide digital terrestrial television coverage was held. All 47 prefectures in Japan are able to receive such broadcasts.
- December 2 – Nintendo's Wii is released in Japan.

== Births ==
- September 6:
  - Prince Hisahito of Akishino
  - Kairi Jo, actor

== Deaths ==
- January 3: Shiro Azuma, soldier
- April 29: Yoichi Numata, actor
- May 1: Kikuo Takano, poet and mathematician
- May 6: Shigeru Kayano, Ainu activist (b. 1926)
- May 10: Raizo Matsuno, politician
- May 16: Takahiro Tamura, actor
- May 29: Masumi Okada, actor
- June 1: Shokichi Iyanaga, mathematician
- June 13: Hiroyuki Iwaki, conductor and percussionist
- June 17: Hiroaki Shukuzawa, rugby coach
- July 1: Ryutaro Hashimoto, prime minister (born 1937)
- July 7: Reizō Nomoto, voice actor
- August 6: Hirotaka Suzuoki, voice actor and actor
- August 9: Chinatsu Mori, shot putter
- September 13: Shokichi Natsui, judoka
- September 17: Kazuyuki Sogabe, voice actor
- September 25: Tetsurō Tamba, actor
- September 30: Jun Tatara, actor
- October 1: Yoshihiro Yonezawa, manga critic and author
- October 29: Reiko Mutō, voice actress
- November 10: Taira Hara, manga artist and tarento
- December 17: Kyōko Kishida, actress
- December 20: Yukio Aoshima, politician
- December 25: Hiroaki Hidaka, serial killer
- December 28: Kōmei Abe, composer

== See also ==
- 2006 in Japanese television
- List of Japanese films of 2006

== Statistics ==
- Wealthiest person in Japan: Masayoshi Son (net worth US$7 billion)
