= 1925 in Japan =

- Decades: 1900s; 1910s; 1920s; 1930s; 1940s
- See also: Other events of 1925; History of Japan • Timeline • Years

Events from the year 1925 in Japan. It corresponds to Taishō 14 (大正14年) in the Japanese calendar.

== Incumbents ==
- Emperor: Taishō
- Regent: Hirohito
- Prime Minister: Katō Takaaki

=== Governors ===
- Aichi Prefecture: Haruki Yamawaki
- Akita Prefecture: Miki Nagano
- Aomori Prefecture: Matsubara Kenshiro (until 16 October); Ryusaku Endo (starting 16 October)
- Ehime Prefecture: Yoshifumi Satake (until 16 September); Masayasu Kosaka (starting 16 October)
- Fukui Prefecture: Katsuzo Toyota
- Fukushima Prefecture: Kosaka Masayasu (until 16 September); Hiroshi Kawabuchi (starting 16 September)
- Gifu Prefecture: Takekai Shirane
- Gunma Prefecture: Ushidzuka Torataro
- Hiroshima Prefecture: Jiro Yamagata (until 16 September); Konosuke Hamada (starting 16 September)
- Ibaraki Prefecture: Tsugino Daisaburo (until 16 September); Kaiichiro Suematsu (starting 16 September)
- Iwate Prefecture: Akira Gotoyu (until 16 September); Kakichi Tokuno (starting 16 September)
- Kagawa Prefecture: Asari Saburo
- Kanagawa Prefecture: Seino Chotarno then Zenjirō Horikiri
- Kochi Prefecture: Fujioka Hyoichi
- Kumamoto Prefecture: Nakagawa Kenzō (until 16 September); Yoshifumi Satake (starting 16 September)
- Kyoto Prefecture: Hiroshi Ikeda
- Mie Prefecture: Kunitoshi Yamaoka
- Miyagi Prefecture: Manbei Ueda
- Miyazaki Prefecture: Saito Munenori (until 16 September); Nagaura (starting 16 September)
- Nagano Prefecture: Toshio Honma (until 24 June); Umetani Mitsusada (starting 24 June)
- Niigata Prefecture: Ohara Sanarata (until 18 October); Takeo Mimatsu (starting 18 October)
- Okayama Prefecture: Masao Kishimoto
- Okinawa Prefecture: Mitsumasa Kamei
- Saga Prefecture: Saito
- Saitama Prefecture: Saito Morikuni
- Shiga Prefecture: Kaiichiro Suematsu (until month unknown); Morio Takahashi (starting month unknown)
- Shiname Prefecture: Sotaro Taro
- Tochigi Prefecture: Otsuka
- Tokyo: Katsuo Usami (until 16 September); Hiroshi Hiratsuka (starting 16 September)
- Toyama Prefecture: Masao Oka
- Yamagata Prefecture: Miura

== Events ==
- January 20 – Soviet–Japanese Basic Convention is signed between the Empire of Japan and the Soviet Union. Ratifications were exchanged in Beijing on February 26, 1925. The agreement was registered in the League of Nations Treaty Series on May 20, 1925.
- March 5 – Nippon Air Brake (Nabco) was founded in Kobe, as predecessor of Nabtesco.
- March 7 – The Public Security Preservation Law of 1925 (治安維持法, Chian Iji Hō) is passed in the diet. It forbade conspiracy and revolt, and it criminalized socialism and communism. It was one of the most significant laws of pre-war Japan.
- March – A nation's first license radio station, NHK Radio One, an official broadcasting service start in Tokyo, following start on June 1 in Osaka and July 15 in Nagoya.
- April Unknown date – Sanki Engineering was founded.
- May 1 – Matsuya Department Store of Ginza was open in Tokyo.
- May 5 – The General Election Law (普通選挙法, Futsu Senkyo Hō) was passed, giving all men above age 25 the right to vote.
- May 12 – The Public Security Preservation Law is enacted.
- May 23 – 1925 Kita Tajima earthquake
- November 13 – The University of Tokyo Earthquake Research Institute is founded.
- December 28 – The Tokyo-based sumo association absorbed its Osaka-based rival to form the Dai-Nihon Sumō Kyōkai (大日本相撲協会, All Japan Sumo Association).

== Births ==
- January 11 – Kihachirō Kawamoto, film director, screenwriter and animator (d. 2010)
- January 14 – Yukio Mishima, author, poet, and playwright (d. 1970)
- January 28 – Yasuji Mori, animator (d. 1992)
- February 26 – Hitoshi Takagi, voice actor (d. 2004)
- February 27 – Shoichiro Toyoda, business executive (d. 2023)
- March 12 – Leo Esaki, physicist, Nobel laureate
- May 10 – Norio Kijima, announcer and politician (d. 1990)
- July 12 – Yasushi Akutagawa, composer and conductor (d. 1989)
- August 13 – Asao Sano, actor (d. 2022)
- November 30 – Genshō Imanari, literature academic (d. 2020)
- December 6 – Shigeko, Princess Teru, later "Shigeko Higashikuni", eldest child of Emperor Shōwa (d. 1961)

== Deaths ==
- January 4 – Hirase Sakugorō, botanist and painter (b. 1856)
- January 8 – Uemura Masahisa, Christian pastor and theologian (b. 1858)
- April 14 – Hirata Tosuke, politician and Lord Keeper of the Privy Seal of Japan (b. 1849)
- May 21 – Hidesaburō Ueno, agricultural scientist (b. 1872)
- May 25 – Yoichirō Hirase, malacologist (b. 1859)
- September 25 – Hamao Arata, politician (b. 1849)
- September 30 – Inō Kanori, anthropologist and folklorist (b. 1867)

== See also ==
- List of Japanese films of the 1920s
