= 1926 in Japan =

- Decades: 1900s; 1910s; 1920s; 1930s; 1940s
- See also: Other events of 1926; History of Japan • Timeline • Years

Events in the year 1926 in Japan. In the history of Japan, it marks the final year of the Taishō period, Taishō 15 (大正15年), upon the death of Emperor Taishō on December 25, and the beginning of the Shōwa period, Shōwa 1, (昭和元年), upon the accession of his son Emperor Shōwa (Hirohito). In the Japanese calendar Shōwa 1 was just six days long, prior to January 1 Showa 2 (1927, 昭和2年).

== Incumbents ==
- Emperor:
  - Taishō: until December 25
  - Shōwa: starting December 25
- Regent: Hirohito until December 25
- Prime Minister:
  - Katō Takaaki: until January 28
  - Wakatsuki Reijirō: starting January 30

=== Governors ===
- Aichi Prefecture: Haruki Yamawaki (until 28 September); Saburo Shibata (starting 28 September)
- Akita Prefecture: Miki Nagano (until 28 September); Nakano Kunikazu (starting 28 September)
- Aomori Prefecture: Ryusaku Endo (until 28 September); Koyanagi Mamoru (starting 28 September)
- Ehime Prefecture: Masayasu Kosaka
- Fukui Prefecture: Katsuzo Toyota (until 5 August); Keizo Ichimura (starting 5 August)
- Fukushima Prefecture: Hiroshi Kawabuchi
- Gifu Prefecture: Takekai Shirane (until 28 September); Shintaro Suzuki (starting 28 September)
- Gunma Prefecture: Ushidzuka Torataro (until 18 December); Kotsuke (starting 18 December)
- Hiroshima Prefecture: Konosuke Hamada (until 28 September); Kaiichiro Suematsu (starting 28 September)
- Ibaraki Prefecture: Kaiichiro Suematsu (until 28 September); Kihachiro Ito (starting 28 September)
- Iwate Prefecture: Kakichi Tokuno
- Kagawa Prefecture: Asari Saburo (until 28 September); Misho Miura (starting 28 September)
- Kanagawa Prefecture: Zenjirō Horikiri (until month unknown); Ikeda Hiroshi (starting month unknown)
- Kochi Prefecture: Fujioka Hyoichi (until 28 September); Sato Naorimittsu (starting 28 September)
- Kumamoto Prefecture: Yoshifumi Satake (until 28 September); Masao Oka (starting month unknown)
- Kyoto Prefecture: Hiroshi Ikeda (until September); Tsunenosuke Hamada (starting September)
- Mie Prefecture: Kunitoshi Yamaoka (until 28 September); Endo Ryusaku (starting 28 September)
- Miyagi Prefecture: Manbei Ueda (until 18 December); Katorataro Ushizu (starting 18 December)
- Miyazaki Prefecture: Nagaura (until 28 September); Kiyoo Aida (starting 28 September)
- Nagano Prefecture: Umetani Mitsusada
- Niigata Prefecture: Takeo Mimatsu
- Okayama Prefecture: Masao Kishimoto
- Okinawa Prefecture: Mitsumasa Kamei (until 28 September); Tsuguo Imashuku (starting 28 September)
- Osaka Prefecture: Harumichi Tanabe (starting month unknown)
- Saga Prefecture: Saito (until 28 September); Nagaura (starting 28 September)
- Saitama Prefecture:
  - until 17 May: Saito Morikuni
  - 17 May-7 November: Yashu
  - starting 7 November: Miyawaki Umekichi
- Shiga Prefecture: Morio Takahashi (until month unknown); Shinya Kurosaki (starting month unknown)
- Shiname Prefecture: Sotaro Taro (until 28 September); Jiro Morioko (starting 28 September)
- Tochigi Prefecture: Hyoichi Fujioka (until 28 September); Hyoichi Fujioka (starting 28 September)
- Tokyo: Hiroshi Hiratsuka
- Toyama Prefecture: Masao Oka (until 28 September); Yukichi Shirakami (starting 28 September)
- Yamagata Prefecture: Miura (until 28 September); Misawa Kan'ichi (starting 28 September)

== Events ==
- January 12 – Toray (then Toyo Rayon) was founded.
- January 28 – Prime Minister Katō Takaaki dies in office. Wakatsuki Reijirō serves as acting Prime Minister until assuming the office proper on January 30.
- March 12 – Japanese warship bombards the Taku Forts in China, killing several Guominjun troops guarding the forts. Guominjun troops fired back in retaliation and drive the warship out of the Tanggu harbor.
- May 24 – A volcano eruption hit in Mount Tokachi, Hokkaido, according to Japanese government official document figure showed, 144 persons were fatalities, 21 persons missing, about 200 persons were hurt.
- June 10 – June 10th Movement: public displays of Korean resistance organized by students against Japanese rule take place in Korea.
- June 12 – The Japan Amateur Radio League, national non-profit organization for amateur radio enthusiasts, is founded by Japanese radio communication enthusiasts whose stated aim was to promote the development and utilization of radio wave technology as a medium.
- June 23 – Kuraray, (then Kurashiki Rayon) founded in Kurashiki, Okayama Prefecture.
- September 15 – Toshimaen, a representative amusement park in Tokyo was officially open, where closed on 31 August 2020, convert into a Harry Potter new theme park replace in March 2023.
- September 16
  - Shin-Etsu Chemical founded in Nagano City.
  - Mikasaya Department Store, as predecessor of Kintetsu Department Store Osaka Uehonmachi was officially open in Tennoji-ku, Osaka.
- October 23 – Meiji Jingu Stadium was officially open.
- November 18 – Inventor and industrialist Sakichi Toyoda founds the Toyota Industries, the company from which Toyota Motor Corporation would develop.
- December 25 – Emperor Taishō dies and is succeeded by his eldest son, Hirohito who becomes 124th Emperor. This event marks the end of the Taishō period and the beginning of the Shōwa period. Hirohito, Emperor Shōwa reigned as Emperor of Japan until his death in 1989.
- Unknown date – Nippon Shokubai (Catalyst) was founded, as predecessor name was Yosame Sulfuric Acid Industry.

== Births ==
- January 8 – Hanae Mori, fashion designer (d. 2022)
- January 12 – Shumon Miura, writer (d. 2017)
- January 25 – Gaisi Takeuti, mathematician (d. 2017)
- February 5 – Seiichi Miyake, inventor (d. 1982)
- February 7 – Keiko Tsushima, actress (d. 2012)
- February 24 – Kōno Taeko, writer (d. 2015)
- February 25 – Akira Tago, psychologist (d. 2016)
- February 28 – Kin Sugai, actress (d. 2018)
- March 16 – Hisako Tsuji, violinist (d. 2021)
- April 7 – Miyoko Asō, actress and voice actress (d. 2018)
- May 19 – Tadashi Sawashima, film and theater director (d. 2018)
- May 30 – Tsuneo Watanabe, businessman (d. 2024)
- June 12 – Noriko Ibaragi, poet, playwright, essayist and translator (d. 2006)
- June 15 – Shigeru Kayano, Ainu activist (d. 2006)
- June 16 – Taketoshi Naito, actor (d. 2012)
- June 19 – Ōuchiyama Heikichi, sumo wrestler (d. 1985)
- June 28 – Mitsugi Ohno, glassblower (d. 1999)
- September 6 – Shinichi Hoshi, novelist and writer (d. 1997)
- September 15 – Shohei Imamura, film director (d. 2006)
- December 9
  - Michiyoshi Doi, film director (d. 1975)
  - Keiji Sada, actor (d. 1964)
- December 25 – Hitoshi Ueki, (d. 2007)

== Deaths ==
- January 28 – Katō Takaaki, politician and 24th Prime Minister of Japan (b. 1860)
- February 1 – Ishibashi Ningetsu, author and literature critic (b. 1865)
- February 14 – Enkichi Ōki, politician (b. 1871)
- March 9 – Mikao Usui, founder of Reiki (b. 1865)
- April 7
  - Ozaki Hōsai, poet (b. 1885)
  - Hozumi Nobushige, statesman and jurist (b. 1855)
- April 28 – Kawamura Kageaki, field marshal (b. 1850)
- June 28 – Hirai Seijirō, railroad engineer (b. 1856)
- July 4 – Ushinosuke Mori, anthropologist and folklorist (b. 1877)
- July 9 – Fujii Kōichi, admiral (b. 1858)
- July 23 – Fumiko Kaneko, anarchist (b. 1903)
- September 8 – Thomas Kurihara, actor and film director (b. 1885)
- September 11 – Matsunosuke Onoe, kabuki and silent film actor (b. 1875)
- September 28 – Satarō Fukiage, rapist and serial killer (b. 1889)
- November 28 – Takahira Kogorō, diplomat and ambassador (b. 1854)
- December 25 – Emperor Taishō, 123rd Emperor of Japan (b. 1879)

== See also ==
- List of Japanese films of the 1920s
