= 2004 in Japan =

- Decades: 1980s; 1990s; 2000s; 2010s; 2020s
- See also: Other events of 2004; History of Japan • Timeline • Years

Events in the year 2004 in Japan.

2004 was the population "peak" of Japan—the last year in which the national population increased.

== Incumbents ==
- Emperor: Akihito
- Prime Minister: Junichiro Koizumi (L–Kanagawa)
- Chief Cabinet Secretary: Yasuo Fukuda (L–Gunma) until May 7, Hiroyuki Hosoda (L–Shimane)
- Chief Justice of the Supreme Court: Akira Machida
- President of the House of Representatives: Yōhei Kōno (L–Kanagawa)
- President of the House of Councillors: Hiroyuki Kurata (L–Chiba) until July 30, Chikage Ōgi (L–proportional)
- Diet sessions: 159th (regular, January 19 to June 15), 160th (extraordinary, July 30 to August 6), 161st (October 12 to December 3)

=== Governors ===
- Aichi Prefecture: Masaaki Kanda
- Akita Prefecture: Sukeshiro Terata
- Aomori Prefecture: Shingo Mimura
- Chiba Prefecture: Akiko Dōmoto
- Ehime Prefecture: Moriyuki Kato
- Fukui Prefecture: Issei Nishikawa
- Fukuoka Prefecture: Wataru Asō
- Fukushima Prefecture: Eisaku Satō
- Gifu Prefecture: Taku Kajiwara
- Gunma Prefecture: Hiroyuki Kodera
- Hiroshima Prefecture: Yūzan Fujita
- Hokkaido: Harumi Takahashi
- Hyogo Prefecture: Toshizō Ido
- Ibaraki Prefecture: Masaru Hashimoto
- Ishikawa Prefecture: Masanori Tanimoto
- Iwate Prefecture: Hiroya Masuda
- Kagawa Prefecture: Takeki Manabe
- Kagoshima Prefecture: Tatsurō Suga (until 27 July); Satoshi Mitazono (starting 27 July)
- Kanagawa Prefecture: Shigefumi Matsuzawa
- Kochi Prefecture: Daijiro Hashimoto
- Kumamoto Prefecture: Yoshiko Shiotani
- Kyoto Prefecture: Keiji Yamada
- Mie Prefecture: Akihiko Noro
- Miyagi Prefecture: Shirō Asano
- Miyazaki Prefecture: Tadahiro Ando
- Nagano Prefecture: Yasuo Tanaka
- Nagasaki Prefecture: Genjirō Kaneko
- Nara Prefecture: Yoshiya Kakimoto
- Niigata Prefecture: Ikuo Hirayama (until 24 October); Hirohiko Izumida (starting 25 October)
- Oita Prefecture: Katsusada Hirose
- Okayama Prefecture: Masahiro Ishii
- Okinawa Prefecture: Keiichi Inamine
- Osaka Prefecture: Fusae Ōta
- Saga Prefecture: Yasushi Furukawa
- Saitama Prefecture: Kiyoshi Ueda
- Shiga Prefecture: Yoshitsugu Kunimatsu
- Shiname Prefecture: Nobuyoshi Sumita
- Shizuoka Prefecture: Yoshinobu Ishikawa
- Tochigi Prefecture: Akio Fukuda (until 8 December); Tomikazu Fukuda (starting 9 December)
- Tokushima Prefecture: Kamon Iizumi
- Tokyo: Shintarō Ishihara
- Tottori Prefecture: Yoshihiro Katayama
- Toyama Prefecture: Yutaka Nakaoki (until 8 November); Takakazu Ishii (starting 9 November)
- Wakayama Prefecture: Yoshiki Kimura
- Yamagata Prefecture: Kazuo Takahashi
- Yamaguchi Prefecture: Sekinari Nii
- Yamanashi Prefecture: Takahiko Yamamoto

== Events ==
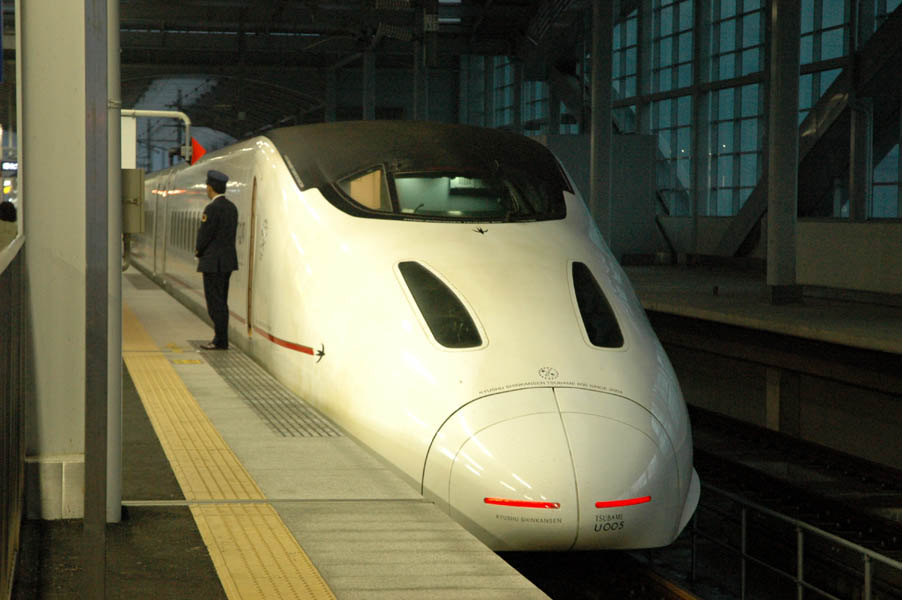
Kyushu Shinkansen opened in March.

=== January ===
- January 19: Deployment of Japanese troops to Iraq begins as the first set of ground forces arrive in Samawah.

=== February ===
- February 8: The Ground Self-Defense Force's main unit of the SDF dispatched to Iraq enters Samawah, Iraq.
- February 12: The Tokyo District Court has ruled two years in prison and five years in prison for former member of the House of Representatives Kiyomi Tsujimoto who was accused of fraudulent misappropriation of secretary salary. Neither the prosecution nor the defendant appealed, and the ruling was finalized on March 26.
- February 17: Avian influenza virus infection in pet chicken (chabo) was confirmed in Kokonoe-cho, Oita Prefecture (the second case this year following Yamaguchi).
- February 27: Aum Shinrikyo leader Shoko Asahara is given the death penalty.

=== March ===
- March: The Tamagotchi Connection is released in Japan.
- March 4: Famed Yomiuri Giants manager Shigeo Nagashima is hospitalized.
- March 13: First segment of the Kyushu Shinkansen opens.
- March 17: Tokyo District Court issues an injunction halting the sale of Bungei Shunju issues due to a breach of privacy suit by Makiko Tanaka.
- March 24: Chinese activists land in the Senkaku Islands and are arrested by Okinawan police.
- March 30: Nurse Daisuke Mori is sentenced to life imprisonment.

=== April ===
- April 1
  - Japan Airlines and Japan Air System merge.
  - New Tokyo International Airport is privatized and renamed Narita International Airport.
  - Teito Rapid Transit Authority becomes Tokyo Metro.
- April 7: Three Japanese civilians taken hostage in Iraq.
- April 8: Economist and graduate school professor Kazuhide Uekusa is arrested for trying to peep under a schoolgirl's skirt on the escalator of JR Shinagawa Station.

=== May ===
- May 10
  - Winny developer Isamu Kaneko, assistant instructor at Tokyo University, is arrested on charges of contributory copyright infringement.
  - Crown Prince Naruhito denounces palace officials at a press conference, suggesting that Crown Princess Masako is physically and mentally sick.
- May 22: Prime Minister Junichiro Koizumi visits Pyongyang to bring back 5 Japanese youths who were born while their parents were hostages in North Korea.

=== June ===
- June 1: An 11-year-old girl kills her classmate at a Sasebo elementary school.

=== July ===
- July 1: Sacred Sites and Pilgrimage Routes in the Kii Mountain Range enlisted as a world heritage site.
- July 8: Naha District Court in Okinawa sentences US Marine Major Michael Brown to a suspended one-year prison term on charge of attempted rape against a Filipina.
- July 11: In elections for the Upper House. the LDP suffers a small setback.
- July 18: Heavy rain disaster, re-dike collapse and sediment collapse in Fukui, Sanjō, Niigata and Tadami, Fukushima, resulting to 20 persons fatalities.
- July 21: Koizumi meets Roh Moo-hyun at Jeju Island in South Korea.
- July 30: Chikage Ogi becomes the first female Speaker of the House of Councillors.

=== August ===
- August 9: An obsolete steam pipe at Mihama Nuclear Plant blows up, killing four workers.

=== September ===
- September 3: World Rally Championship held in Japan for the first time.
- September 8: Typhoon Songda hit in western Honshu area, according to official document figure, 45 person fatalities, with injures 1324.
- September 17: Japanese baseball players announce a weekend strike, the first baseball strike in Japanese history.
- September 27: Koizumi reshuffles his cabinet.
- September 29–30: Typhoon Meari, according to Fire and Disaster Management Agency official confirmed report, 27 persons were human fatalities and 95 persons wounded.

=== October ===
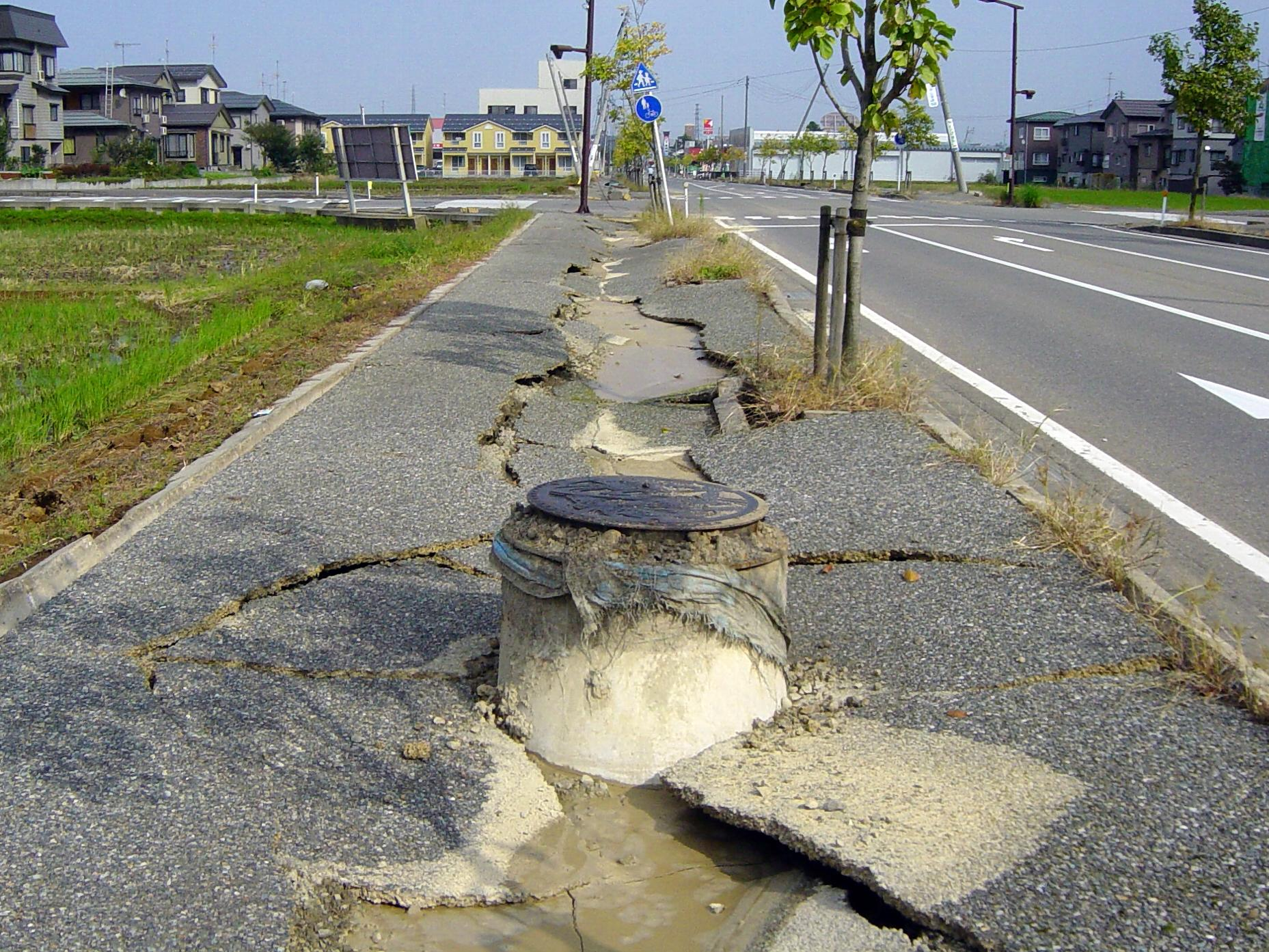
The Chūetsu earthquake struck Niigata in October.

- October 20: Typhoon Tokage makes landfall in Japan.
- October 23: The Chūetsu earthquake strikes Niigata Prefecture, causing widespread damage to the area.

=== November ===
- November 1: Bank of Japan issues new 10,000, 5,000 and 1,000-yen banknotes.
- November 2: Japan's first new professional baseball franchise in 50 years is awarded to the Tohoku Rakuten Golden Eagles.

=== December ===
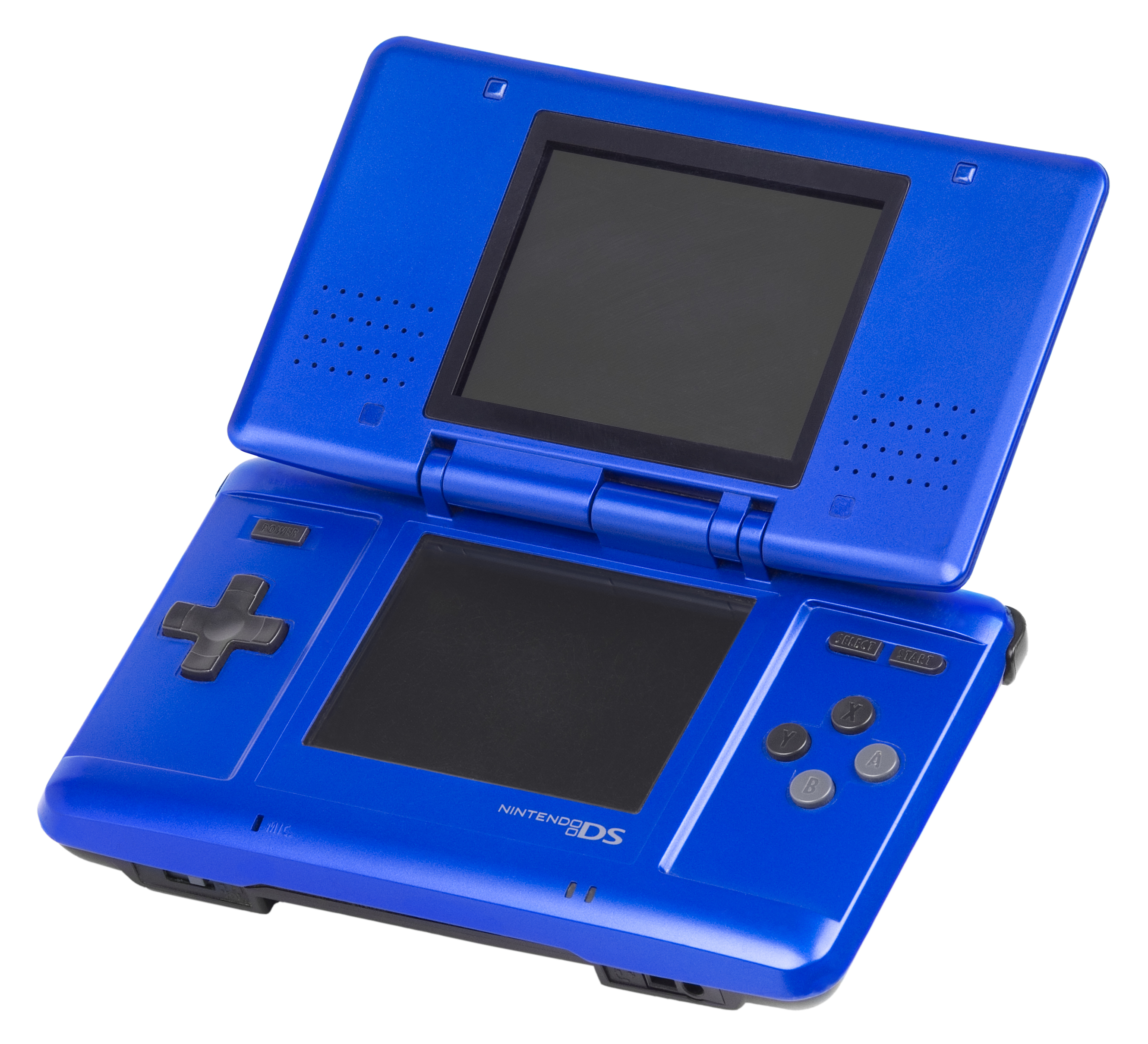
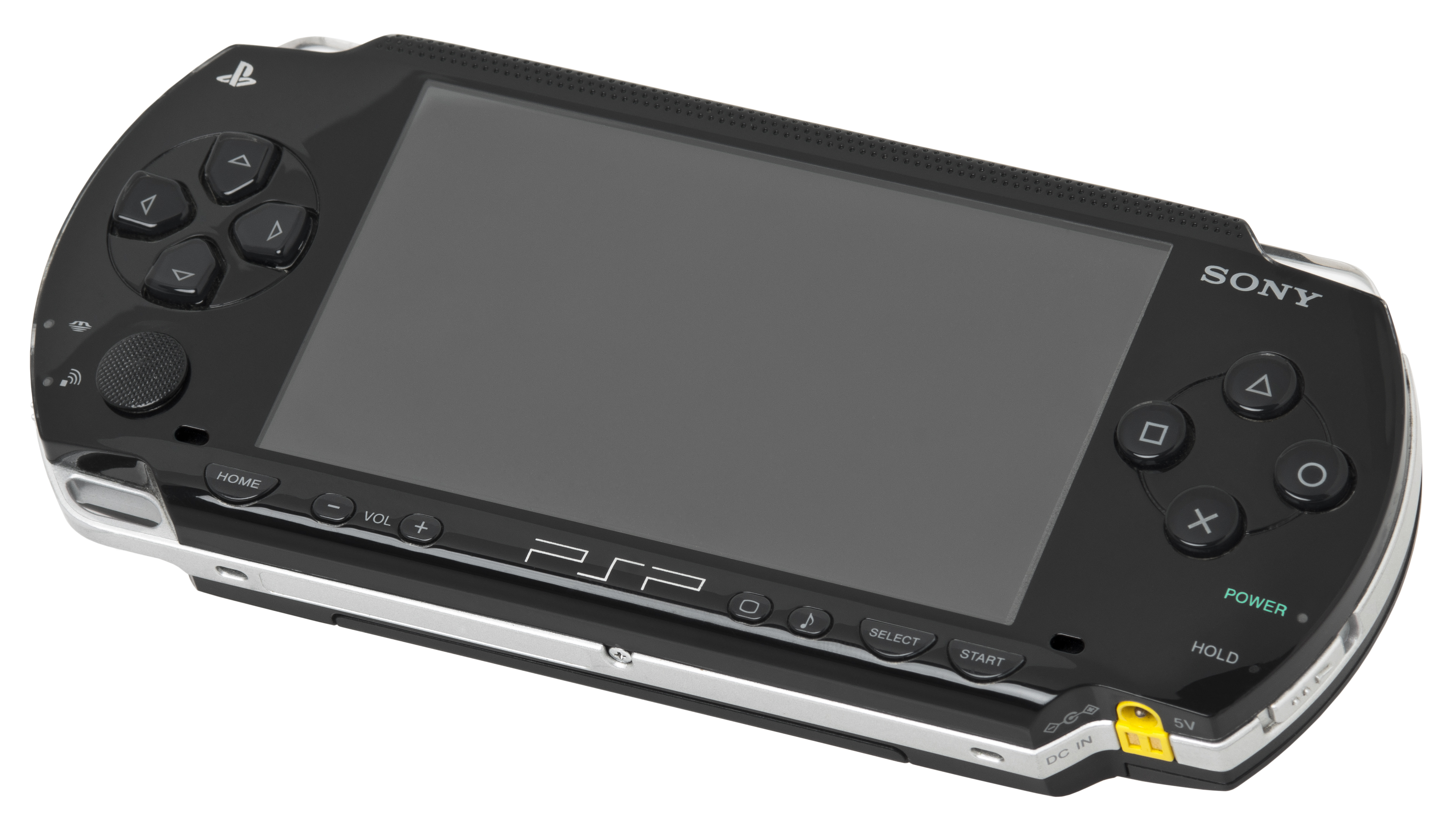
December 2: The Nintendo DS (top) is released in Japan. December 12: The PlayStation Portable (bottom) is released in Japan.
- December 2: The Nintendo DS is released in Japan.
- December 12: The PlayStation Portable is released in Japan.
- December 24: Fukuoka Daiei Hawks are sold to SoftBank and become the Fukuoka SoftBank Hawks.
- December 26: 37 Japanese citizens are among the thousands of people died in the 2004 Indian Ocean earthquake and tsunami. The Japanese victims are affected in countries, such as Thailand, Indonesia, India, Sri Lanka, and the Maldives.

== Births ==
- May 4: Kanon Tani, actress
- June 1: Miyu Honda, child actress
- June 14: Soyoka Yoshida, entertainer
- June 16: Shota Taguchi, actor.
- June 17: Fuku Suzuki, actor
- June 23: Mana Ashida, actress
- August 28: Kano Fujihira, entertainer
- September 4: Kota Takai, professional football player
- September 7: Tsugumi Aritomo, entertainer
- September 25: Seiran Kobayashi, actress
- October 7: Mayu Honda, judoka
- November 24: Shogo Asano, professioinal baseball player
- December 8: Momoe Mori, entertainer
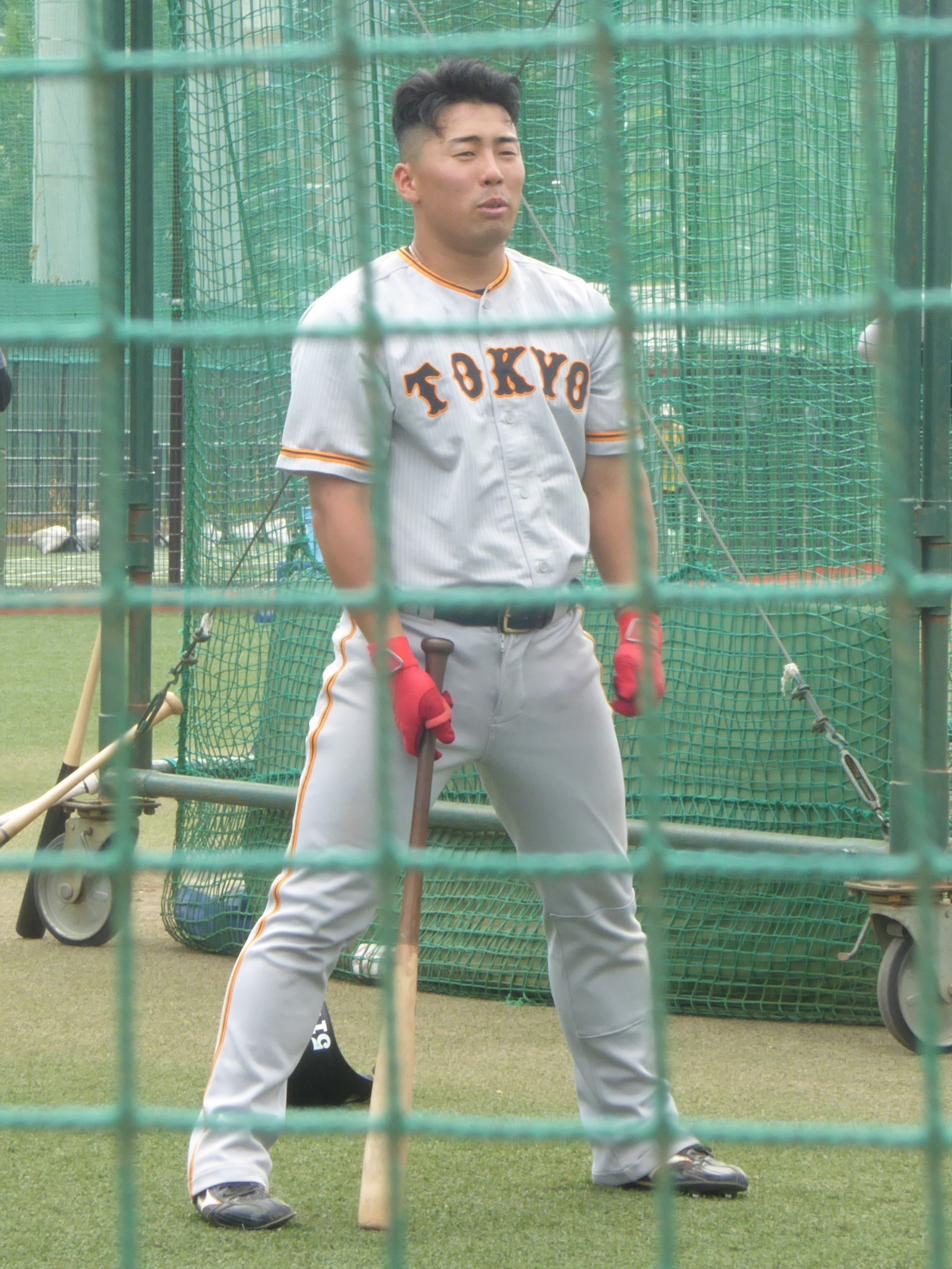
Shogo Asano

== Deaths ==
- January 1: Isao Tamagawa, actor
- January 24: Tomio Aoki, actor
- February 2: Michio Hikitsuchi, aikido instructor
- February 6: Masataka Ida, soldier
- February 11: Hitoshi Takagi voice actor
- March 5: Masanori Tokita, football player
- March 20: Chosuke Ikariya, comedian and film actor
- April 15: Mitsuteru Yokoyama, manga artist (b. 1934)
- April 21: Den Fujita, president of McDonald's Japan
- May 21: Toshikazu Kase, civil servant and career diplomat
- July 19: Zenkō Suzuki, politician, Prime minister
- July 26: Ramo Nakajima, novelist
- September 14: Mamoru Takuma, murderer (executed)
- October 7: Miki Matsubara, singer, lyricist and composer
- October 8: Mei Zhi, children's author and essayist
- November 6: Kensaburo Hara, politician
- November 17: Ariyama Kaede, murder victim
- November 24: Taiji Kase, master of Shotokan karate
- November 26: Shōgo Shimada, actor
- December 18: Kikuko, Princess Takamatsu

== Statistics ==
- GDP: ¥504 trillion (+1.4%)
- Nikkei 225: High 12,163.89; low 10,365.40
- Wealthiest person in Japan: Nobutada Saji (net worth US$6.9 billion)
- Yen: High ¥101.83/USD; low ¥114.80/USD

== See also ==
- 2004 in Japanese television
- List of Japanese films of 2004
