= 2007 in Japan =

- Decades: 1980s; 1990s; 2000s; 2010s; 2020s
- See also: Other events of 2007; History of Japan • Timeline • Years

Events in the year 2007 in Japan.

== Incumbents ==
- Emperor – Akihito
- Prime Minister – Shinzō Abe (Liberal Democratic Party–Yamaguchi) until September 26, Yasuo Fukuda (Liberal Democratic Party–Gunma)
- Chief Cabinet Secretary: Yasuhisa Shiozaki (L–Ehime) to August 27, Kaoru Yosano (L–Tokyo) to September 26, Nobutaka Machimura (L–Hokkaidō)
- Chief Justice of the Supreme Court: Nirō Shimada
- President of the House of Representatives: Yōhei Kōno (L–Kanagawa)
- President of the House of Councillors: Chikage Ōgi (L–proportional) until July 28, Satsuki Eda (D–Okayama)
- Diet sessions: 166th (regular, January 25 to July 5), 167th (extraordinary, August 7 to August 10), 168th (extraordinary, September 10 to 2008, January 15)

=== Governors ===
- Aichi Prefecture: Masaaki Kanda
- Akita Prefecture: Sukeshiro Terata
- Aomori Prefecture: Shingo Mimura
- Chiba Prefecture: Akiko Dōmoto
- Ehime Prefecture: Moriyuki Kato
- Fukui Prefecture: Issei Nishikawa
- Fukuoka Prefecture: Wataru Asō
- Fukushima Prefecture: Yūhei Satō
- Gifu Prefecture: Hajime Furuta
- Gunma Prefecture: Hiroyuki Kodera (until 27 July); Masaaki Osawa (starting 28 July)
- Hiroshima Prefecture: Yūzan Fujita
- Hokkaido: Harumi Takahashi
- Hyogo Prefecture: Toshizō Ido
- Ibaraki Prefecture: Masaru Hashimoto
- Ishikawa Prefecture: Masanori Tanimoto
- Iwate Prefecture: Hiroya Masuda (until 29 April); Takuya Tasso (starting 30 April)
- Kagawa Prefecture: Takeki Manabe
- Kagoshima Prefecture: Satoshi Mitazono
- Kanagawa Prefecture: Shigefumi Matsuzawa
- Kochi Prefecture: Daijiro Hashimoto (until 6 December); Masanao Ozaki (starting 7 December)
- Kumamoto Prefecture: Yoshiko Shiotani
- Kyoto Prefecture: Keiji Yamada
- Mie Prefecture: Akihiko Noro
- Miyagi Prefecture: Yoshihiro Murai
- Miyazaki Prefecture: Kayoko Saka (until 22 January); Hideo Higashikokubaru (starting 23 January)
- Nagano Prefecture: Jin Murai
- Nagasaki Prefecture: Genjirō Kaneko
- Nara Prefecture: Yoshiya Kakimoto (until 2 May); Shōgo Arai (starting 2 May)
- Niigata Prefecture: Hirohiko Izumida
- Oita Prefecture: Katsusada Hirose
- Okayama Prefecture: Masahiro Ishii
- Okinawa Prefecture: Hirokazu Nakaima
- Osaka Prefecture: Fusae Ōta
- Saga Prefecture: Yasushi Furukawa
- Saitama Prefecture: Kiyoshi Ueda
- Shiga Prefecture: Yukiko Kada
- Shiname Prefecture: Nobuyoshi Sumita (until 29 April); Zenbe Mizoguchi (starting 30 April)
- Shizuoka Prefecture: Yoshinobu Ishikawa
- Tochigi Prefecture: Tomikazu Fukuda
- Tokushima Prefecture: Kamon Iizumi
- Tokyo: Shintarō Ishihara
- Tottori Prefecture: Yoshihiro Katayama (until 13 April); Shinji Hirai (starting 13 April)
- Toyama Prefecture: Takakazu Ishii
- Wakayama Prefecture: Yoshinobu Nisaka
- Yamagata Prefecture: Hiroshi Saitō
- Yamaguchi Prefecture: Sekinari Nii
- Yamanashi Prefecture: Takahiko Yamamoto (until 16 February); Shōmei Yokouchi (starting 17 February)

== Events ==
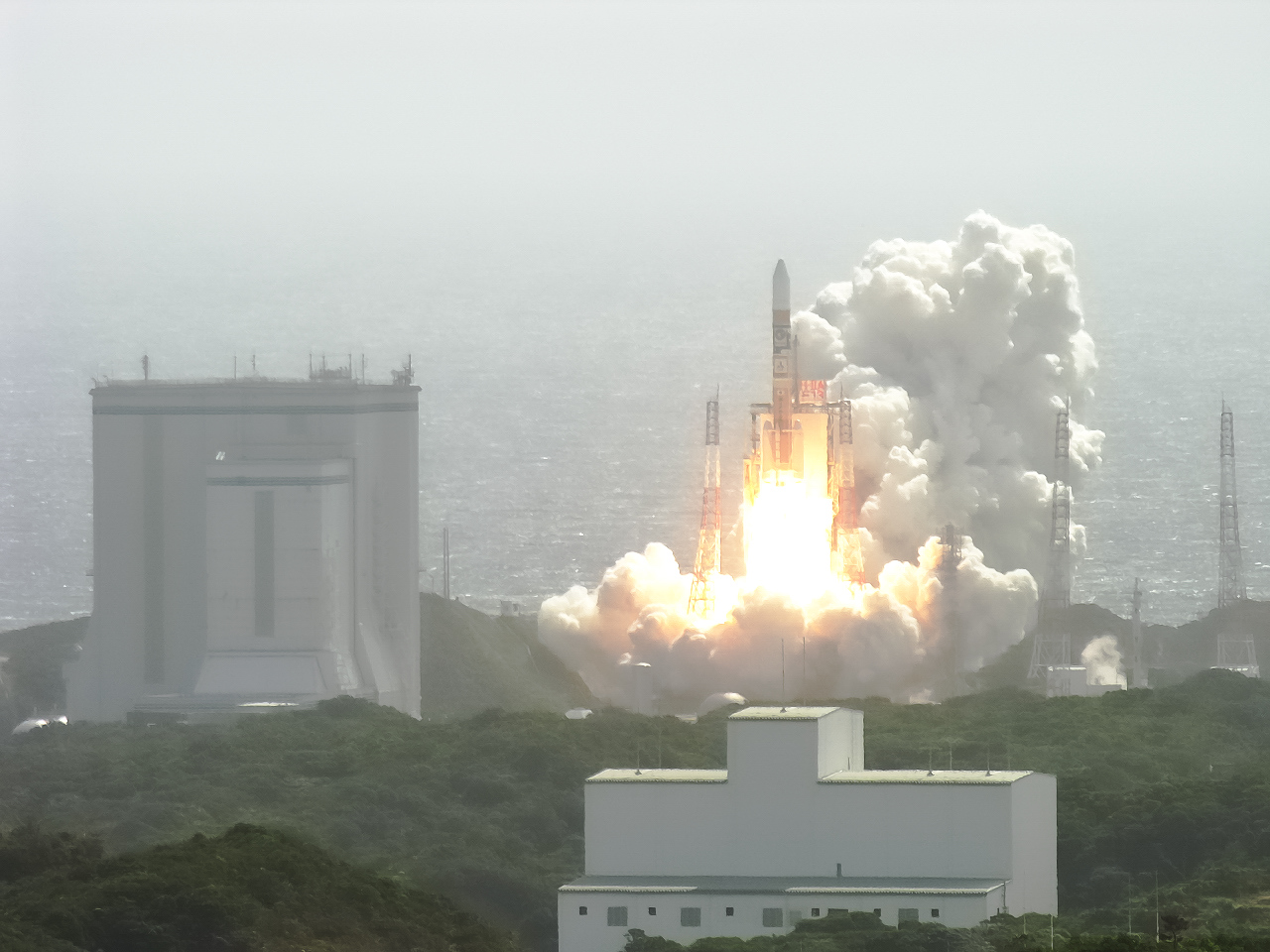
The launch of SELENE, 14 September 2007

=== January ===
- January 23 – A rare eel-like creature identified as a frilled shark is discovered in Japan by fishermen.

=== February ===
- February 20 – A power outage strikes the central area of Nagoya.

=== March ===
- March 25 – A tsunami occurs on the northern coast of Japan after an earthquake with a magnitude of 6.9 in the Sea of Japan. NHK reports that 1 person has died and 162 have been injured.
- March 26 – Prime Minister of Japan Shinzo Abe apologizes for Japan's use of women as sex slaves in frontline brothels during World War II.

=== April ===
- April 1 – Niigata and Hamamatsu become cities designated by government ordinance.
- April 8 – Voters go to the polls in Japan for the first phase of the unified local elections including 13 gubernatorial elections, 44 prefectural assembly elections and 4 mayoral races in major cities.
- April 10 – The government of Japan extends economic sanctions against the North Korean government by an additional six months, citing a lack of progress in resolving kidnapping cases of Japanese citizens.
- April 16 – The United States, Japan and India carry out a joint naval exercise in the Pacific Ocean in an attempt to increase strategic cooperation.
- April 17 – Iccho Ito, the mayor of Nagasaki, Japan, is shot at least twice outside his re-election campaign headquarters. The assassin, Tetsuya Shiroo, is alleged to be a senior member of a local gang affiliated to the Yamaguchi-gumi crime syndicate. Itoh was taken to the Nagasaki University Hospital, where he died early the next morning due to loss of blood.
- April 22 – In the second phase of the unified local elections, hundreds of municipal elections and two by-elections for the national Diet are held.
- April 25 – Japanese police raid the offices of a pro-North Korean group in relation to the alleged kidnapping of two children in the 1970s.

=== May ===
- May 14 – The House of Councillors passes rules for revising the pacifist Constitution of Japan.
- May 28
  - Riyo Mori becomes Miss Universe 2007 in Mexico City, the second Japanese to do so after Akiko Kojima.
  - Minister of Agriculture, Forestry and Fisheries Toshikatsu Matsuoka is found dead at his Tokyo home, hours before he was to face questions in the Diet about his expenses.

=== June ===
- June 1 – Archaeologists discover a 2,100-year-old melon in Shiga Prefecture.
- June 21 – Japan changes the name of Iwo Jima to its original name, Iwo To, to reflect the wishes of its original inhabitants.

=== July ===
- July 3 – Japan's Minister of Defense Fumio Kyuma resigns over comments he made about the atomic bombings of Hiroshima and Nagasaki on the weekend.
- July 4 – Japan's first female Minister of Defense, Yuriko Koike, is sworn in a day after the resignation of her predecessor, Fumio Kyuma.
- July 16 – 2007 Chūetsu offshore earthquake, eleven deaths and at least 1000 injuries were reported, and 342 buildings destroyed.
- July 29 – House of Councillors election

=== August ===
- August 1 – Norihiko Akagi resigns as Japan's agriculture minister after scandals involving him adversely affected the Liberal Democratic Party's performance in the 2007 Japanese House of Councillors election.
- August 24 – Murder of Rie Isogai
- August 25 – The 11th IAAF World Championships in Athletics get underway in Osaka, Japan.
- August 31 – Crypton Future Media's first Vocaloid on their Character Vocal Series, Hatsune Miku, is released for Vocaloid 2 software.

=== September ===
- September 12 – Prime Minister Shinzo Abe announces his resignation.
- September 14 – The Japan Aerospace Exploration Agency successfully launches SELENE, the largest lunar mission since the Apollo program, on a mission to explore the Moon.
- September 23 – Yasuo Fukuda, a political moderate, is elected by Japan's governing Liberal Democratic Party to become the country's next prime minister.

=== November ===
- November 18 – Japan resumes whaling of humpbacks for the first time in 40 years. Greenpeace and other environmentalist groups condemn the decision.
- November 28 – The Chinese Type 051B destroyer Shenzhen visits Tokyo in the first visit of a Chinese warship to Japan since World War II.

=== December ===
- December 19 – A 32-year-old police sergeant shoots himself inside a kōban in front of Tokyo Station.

== Births ==
- June 11 – Jun Saitō, actor
- August 30 – Momiji Nishiya, Olympic skateboarder
- September 18 – Toshiki Kumagai, actor and voice actor

== Deaths ==
- January 5 – Momofuku Ando, inventor of Instant noodles and Cup Noodles, founder of Nissin Foods
- January 8 – Iwao Takamoto, animator
- April 18 – Iccho Itoh, mayor of Nagasaki
- May 3 – Knock Yokoyama, comedian and politician
- May 27 – Izumi Sakai, singer
- May 28 – Toshikatsu Matsuoka, politician
- June 28 – Kiichi Miyazawa, 78th Prime Minister
- July 18 – Kenji Miyamoto, politician
- August 28 – Miyoshi Umeki, actress
- September 7 – Kenji Nagai, journalist (b. 1957)
- October 7 – Norifumi Abe, motorcycle road racer
- October 12 – Kurokawa Kisho, architect
- November 13 – Kazuhisa Inao, baseball player

== See also ==
- 2007 in Japanese music
- 2007 in Japanese television
- List of Japanese films of 2007
