= 1924 in Japan =

- Decades: 1900s; 1910s; 1920s; 1930s; 1940s
- See also: Other events of 1924; History of Japan • Timeline • Years

Events in the year 1924 in Japan. It corresponds to Taishō 13 (大正13年) in the Japanese calendar.

== Incumbents ==
- Emperor: Taishō
- Regent: Hirohito
- Prime Minister:
  - Yamamoto Gonnohyōe (until January 7)
  - Kiyoura Keigo (from January 7 until June 11)
  - Katō Takaaki (from June 11)

=== Governors ===
- Aichi Prefecture: Masahiro Ota (until 11 June); Haruki Yamawaki (starting 11 June)
- Akita Prefecture:
  - until 18 June: Masao Kishimoto
  - 18 June-1 December: Hideo Ikeda
  - starting 1 December: Miki Nagano
- Aomori Prefecture:
  - until 6 June: Kazue Baba
  - 6 June-24 June: Ichiro Ogata
  - starting 24 June: Matsubara Kenshiro
- Ehime Prefecture: Juunosuke Miyazaki (until 24 June); Yoshifumi Satake (starting 24 June)
- Fukui Prefecture:
  - until 4 June: Josuke Shiraogawa
  - 4 June-23 July: Takasuke Fukunaga
  - starting 23 July: Katsuzo Toyota
- Fukushima Prefecture: Kosaka Masayasu
- Gifu Prefecture: Manpei Ueda (until 24 June); Takekai Shirane (starting 24 June)
- Gunma Prefecture: Yamaoka Kunitoshi (until 23 July); Ushidzuka Torataro (starting 23 July)
- Hiroshima Prefecture: Jiro Yamagata
- Ibaraki Prefecture: Shohei Fujinuma (until 9 January); Tsugino Daisaburo (starting 9 January)
- Iwate Prefecture: Ushidzuka Torataro (until 23 July); Akira Gotoyu (starting 23 July)
- Kagawa Prefecture: Nakagawa Kenzo (until 24 June); Asari Saburo (starting 24 June)
- Kanagawa Prefecture: Seino Chotarno
- Kochi Prefecture: Fujioka Hyoichi
- Kumamoto Prefecture: Chisato Tanaka (until 24 June); Nakagawa Kenzō (starting 24 June)
- Kyoto Prefecture: Tokikazu Ikematsu (until December); Hiroshi Ikeda (starting December)
- Mie Prefecture:
  - until 13 March: Tago Ilman
  - 13 March-23 July: Ryo Chiba
  - starting 23 July: Kunitoshi Yamaoka
- Miyagi Prefecture: Yuichiro Chikaraishi (until 24 June); Manbei Ueda (starting 24 June)
- Miyazaki Prefecture: Saito Munenori
- Nagano Prefecture: Toshio Honma
- Niigata Prefecture: Ohara Sanarata
- Okayama Prefecture: Masao Kishimoto
- Okinawa Prefecture: Ki Iwamoto (until 24 June); Mitsumasa Kamei (starting 24 June)
- Saga Prefecture: Tominaga (until 23 July); Saito (starting 23 July)
- Saitama Prefecture: Motoda Tashio (until 24 June); Saito Morikuni (starting 24 June)
- Shiga Prefecture: Kaiichiro Suematsu
- Shiname Prefecture: Naganobu Ren (until 24 June); Sotaro Taro (starting 24 June)
- Tochigi Prefecture: Haruki Yamawaki (until 13 June); Otsuka (starting 13 June)
- Tokyo: Katsuo Usami
- Toyama Prefecture: Kihachiro Ito (until 23 July); Masao Oka (starting 23 July)
- Yamagata Prefecture:
  - until 24 June: Agata Shinobu
  - 24 June-17 December: Masao Kishimoto
  - starting 17 December: Miura

== Events ==
- January 26 – The future Emperor Shōwa marries Princess Kuninomiya Nagako.
- February 2 – Toyama Toy Manufacturing, as predecessor of Takara Tomy founded.
- May 4–July 27 – Japan competed at the 1924 Summer Olympics in Paris, France. Japan fielded a team of 28 athletes, who competed in four events.
- May 10 – 1924 Japanese general election: No party won a majority of seats, resulting in Kenseikai, Rikken Seiyūkai and the Kakushin Club forming the country's first coalition government led by Katō Takaaki.
- May 26 – The Asian Exclusion Act is enacted by the United States. Its broad discrimination against Asia is seen as the spark that spurred Japan down the path against their former allies into World War II.
- August 1 – Koshien Stadium open in Hyogo Prefecture.
- November date unknown – Mogamiya, as predecessor of Bourbon Confectionery founded in Kashiwazaki, Niigata Prefecture.
- November 29 – Tokyo Broadcasting Station, as public associated corporate, was founded, later, Japan Broadcasting Corporation (NHK).
- December 27 – A dynamite explosion during logistic handling work in Temiya Station, Otaru, Hokkaido, resulting to death toll was 94 persons, according to Japanese government official confirmed report.
- Unknown date
  - Takarazuka Grand Theater, official open in Hyogo Prefecture.
  - Fukuoka Mujin, as predecessor of Nishinippon City Bank was established in Fukuoka Prefecture.

== Births ==
- February 18 – Fubuki Koshiji, an actress and singer (d. 1980)
- February 24 – Chikage Awashima, a film actress (d. 2012)
- February 26 – Noboru Takeshita, the 74th Prime Minister of Japan (d. 2000)
- March 3 – Tomiichi Murayama, the 81st Prime Minister of Japan
- March 7 – Kōbō Abe, a writer, playwright and photographer (d. 1993)
- March 25 – Machiko Kyō, a film actress (d. 2019)
- March 27 – Hideko Takamine, a film actress (d. 2010)
- April 13 – Junnosuke Yoshiyuki, a novelist (d. 1994)
- April 29 – Shintaro Abe, a politician and the father of Shinzo Abe (d. 1991)
- April 30 – Masatoshi Ito, a businessman (d. 2023)
- May 20 – Mitsuo Aida, a poet and calligrapher (d. 1991)
- August 12 – Kazuo Shiraga, an abstract painter (d. 2008)
- September 3 – Yosihiko H. Sinoto, an anthropologist (d. 2017)
- September 30 – Fukumi Shimura, a textile artist and writer
- October 1 – Nobuko Otowa, a film actress (d. 1994)
- October 9 – Hachiro Kasuga, an enka singer (d. 1991)
- November 3 – Toyoko Yamasaki, a novelist (d. 2013)
- November 10 – Hachikō, an Akita dog (d. 1935)
- November 13 – Motoo Kimura, a geneticist (d. 1994)
- November 14 – Rikidōzan, a Korean-born wrestler (d. 1963)
- November 25 – Takaaki Yoshimoto, a poet, literary critic, and philosopher (d. 2012)
- December 1 – Masao Horiba, a businessman (d. 2015)

== Deaths ==
- January 11 – Takamiyama Torinosuke, Sumo wrestler (b. 1873)
- January 27 – Hasegawa Yoshimichi, field marshal (b. 1850)
- March 24 – Prince Kachō Hirotada, army lieutenant (b. 1902)
- April 26 – Ijūin Hikokichi, diplomat and politician (b. 1864)
- July 2 – Matsukata Masayoshi, 4th (and 6th) Prime Minister of Japan (b. 1835)
- July 15 – Kuroda Seiki, painter and teacher (b. 1866)
- July 30 – Fusanosuke Gotō, Military personnel (b. 1879)
- October 24 – Nashiba Tokioki, admiral (b. 1850)
- November 15 – Daisuke Namba, communist activist (b. 1899)
- December 8 – Bochō Yamamura, writer, poet and songwriter (b. 1884)
- December 24 – Nakamura Tsune, yōga painter (b. 1887)
- December 31 – Tomioka Tessai, Nanga painter and calligrapher (b. 1837)

== See also ==
- List of Japanese films of the 1920s
