= 1923 in Japan =

- Decades: 1900s; 1910s; 1920s; 1930s; 1940s
- See also: Other events of 1923; History of Japan • Timeline • Years

Events in the year 1923 in Japan. It corresponds to Taishō 12 (大正12年) in the Japanese calendar.

== Incumbents ==
- Emperor: Taishō
- Regent: Hirohito
- Prime Minister:
  - Katō Tomosaburō (until August 24)
  - Yamamoto Gonnohyōe (from September 2)

=== Governors ===
- Aichi Prefecture: Hikoji Kawaguchi (until 16 June); Masahiro Ota (starting 16 June)
- Akita Prefecture: Masao Kishimoto
- Aomori Prefecture: Yujiro Ozaki (until 25 October); Kazue Baba (starting 25 October)
- Ehime Prefecture: Juunosuke Miyazaki
- Fukui Prefecture: Josuke Shiraogawa
- Fukushima Prefecture: Iwata Mamoru (until 25 October); Kosaka Masayasu (starting 25 October)
- Gifu Prefecture: Manpei Ueda
- Gunma Prefecture: Yamaoka Kunitoshi
- Hiroshima Prefecture: Kamehiko Abe (until 25 October); Jiro Yamagata (starting 25 October)
- Ibaraki Prefecture: Genjiro Moriya (until 25 October); Shohei Fujinuma (starting 25 October)
- Iwate Prefecture: Ushidzuka Torataro
- Kagawa Prefecture: Shuji Sasaki (until 25 October); Nakagawa Kenzo (starting 25 October)
- Kanagawa Prefecture: Yasukouchi Asakichi
- Kochi Prefecture: Toyoji Obata (until 25 October); Fujioka Hyoichi (starting 25 October)
- Kumamoto Prefecture: Tadahiko Okada (until 12 October); Chisato Tanaka (starting 12 October)
- Kyoto Prefecture: Tokikazu Ikematsu
- Mie Prefecture: Saburo Shibata (until 25 October); Tago Ilman (starting 25 October)
- Miyagi Prefecture: Yuichiro Chikaraishi
- Miyazaki Prefecture: Muneyoshi Oshiba (until 25 October); Saito Munenori (starting 25 October)
- Nagano Prefecture: Toshio Honma
- Niigata Prefecture: Ota Masahiro (until 11 June); Ohara Sanarata (starting 11 June)
- Okayama Prefecture: Masao Kishimoto
- Okinawa Prefecture: Jyun Wada (until 25 October); Ki Iwamoto (starting 25 October)
- Saga Prefecture: Tominaga
- Saitama Prefecture: Horiuchi Hidetaro (until 25 October); Motoda Tashio (starting 25 October)'
- Shiga Prefecture: Kaiichiro Suematsu (starting month unknown)
- Shiname Prefecture: Sanehide Takarabe (until 25 October); Naganobu Ren (starting 25 October)
- Tochigi Prefecture: Haruki Yamawaki
- Tokyo: Katsuo Usami
- Toyama Prefecture: Kihachiro Ito
- Yamagata Prefecture: Agata Shinobu

== Events ==
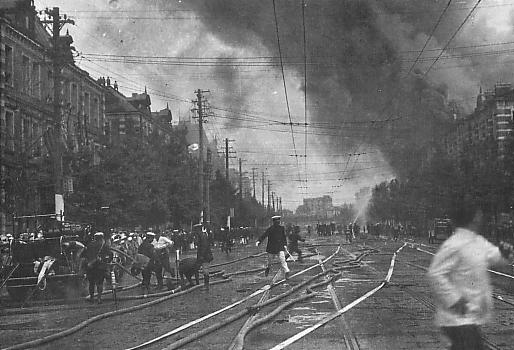
Marunouchi in Tokyo in flames after the Great Kantō earthquake.

- April unknown date – Yamanouchi Pharmaceutical was founded, as predecessor part of Astellas Pharma.
- May 21–25 – 1923 Far Eastern Games held in Osaka.
- August 24 – Prime Minister Katō Tomosaburō dies in office.
- August 29 – Fuji Electric Manufacturing, later Fuji Electric was founded.
- September 1 – The Great Kantō earthquake devastates Tokyo and Yokohama, killing an estimated 142,807 people, but according to a Japanese construction research center report in 2005, 105,000 are confirmed dead. Varied accounts indicate the duration of the earthquake was between four and ten minutes.
- September 1-21 - Kantō Massacre: Young Japanese vigilante groups, driven by rumors of a Korean revolt, attack and murder thousands of Korean residents.
- September 2
  - Yamamoto Gonnohyōe is appointed Prime Minister of Japan.
  - Martial law declared in Tokyo districts
- September 3–5 – Kameido incident
- September 4 – The area of martial law is expanded to cover all of Tokyo, Kanagawa, Chiba, and Saitama prefectures.
- September 7 – A Curfew is issued in Tokyo.
- September 16 – Amakasu Incident: The feminist Noe Itō and her partner, the anarchist Sakae Ōsugi are beaten and killed by a police squadron led by Lieutenant Amakasu Masahiko, along with Ōsugi's six-year-old nephew, and their bodies disposed in a well. Following countrywide outcry, Amakasu was court-martialed and sentenced to 10 years in prison.
- December 27 – Toranomon Incident: An assassination attempt is made on the crown prince Hirohito in Tokyo by Daisuke Namba, but the attempt fails.
- Unknown date –Yamanouchi Pharmacy, as predecessor of Astellas was founded.

== Births ==
- February 17 – Jun Fukuda, film director (d. 2000)
- March 27 – Shūsaku Endō, writer (d. 1996)
- May 24 – Seijun Suzuki, filmmaker, actor, and screenwriter (d. 2017)
- June 4 – Yuriko, Princess Mikasa, wife of Prince Takahito (d. 2024)
- August 7 – Ryōtarō Shiba, writer (d. 1996)
- October 7 – Tomio Aoki, film actor (d. 2004)

== Deaths ==
- January 8 – Shimamura Hayao, Marine Admiral (b. 1858)
- February 3 – Kuroki Tamemoto general (b. 1844)
- February 4 – Prince Fushimi Sadanaru, Field Marshal (b. 1858)
- April 1 – Prince Naruhisa Kitashirakawa, military personnel (b. 1887)
- June 9
  - Takeo Arishima, novelist, writer and essayist (suicide) (b. 1878)
  - Akiko Hatano, journalist (suicide) (b. 1894)
- June 19 – Shō Shō, member of the House of Peers (b. 1888)
- August 24 – Katō Tomosaburō, Prime Minister of Japan (b. 1861)
- September 1 – Matsuoka Yasukowa, politician and cabinet minister (B. 1846)
- September 2 – Kuriyagawa Hakuson, literary critic (b. 1880)
- September 16
  - Noe Itō, anarchist, social critic and author (b. 1895)
  - Sakae Ōsugi, anarchist (b. 1885)
- November 8 – Fusakichi Omori, seismologist (b. 1868)
- November 26 – Otani Kikuzo, general (b. 1856)
- December 29 – Kōno Hironaka, politician (b. 1849)

== See also ==
- List of Japanese films of the 1920s
