= Saitō =

Saitō, Saito, Saitou or Saitoh (written: 斉藤 or 斎藤) are the 20th and 21st most common Japanese surnames respectively. Less common variants are 齋藤, 齊藤, 才藤 and 齎藤. Notable people with the surname include:

== Notable people with the surname ==
- Kōki Saitō (footballer) (斉藤 光毅; born 2001), Japanese footballer
- Aiko Saito (齋藤 愛子; born 1958), Japanese sailor
- Akane Saito (齊藤 あかね; born 1993), Japanese women's footballer
- Akihiko Saito (斎藤 昭彦; 1961–2005), Japanese security guard taken hostage in Iraq in 2005
- Akio Saito (斉藤 明雄; born 1955), Japanese baseball player
- Akira Saito (motorcyclist) (斉藤 明; born 1963), Japanese motorcycle racer
- Akitoshi Saito (斎藤 彰俊; born 1965), Japanese professional wrestler
- Asuka Saitō (齋藤 飛鳥; born 1998), Japanese idol, singer, actress and fashion model
- Asuto Saitō (斎藤 明日斗; born 1998), Japanese shogi player
- Ayaka Saitō (齋藤 彩夏; born 1988), Japanese voice actress
- Ayaka Saito (karateka) (齊藤 綾夏), Japanese karateka
- Ayako Saitoh (born 1956), Japanese wheelchair curler, 2010 Winter Paralympian
- Ayumu Saito (斎藤 歩; 1964–2025), Japanese playwright, director, actor and theatre producer
- Chiho Saito (さいとう ちほ; born 1967), Japanese manga artist
- Saitō Chikudō (斉藤 竹堂; 1815–1852), Japanese Confucian scholar, historian, and poet
- Chisato Saito (齊藤 千聖; born 1988), Japanese long-distance runner
- Chiwa Saitō (斎藤 千和; born 1981), Japanese voice actress
- Daigo Saito (斎藤 太吾; born 1980), Japanese drifting driver
- Daisuke Saito (footballer, born 1974) (斎藤 大輔), Japanese footballer
- Daisuke Saito (footballer, born 1980) (斉藤 大介), Japanese footballer
- Saitō Dōsan (斎藤 道三; 1494–1556), Japanese samurai and daimyō
- Eishiro Saito (斎藤 英四郎; 1911–2002), Japanese businessman
- Eva Saito-Noda (1921–2004), Canadian composer
- Fumio Saito (斎藤 文夫; born 1953), Japanese basketball player
- Fusae Saitō (齊藤 房江; born 1951), the married name of Fusae Ohta, Japanese politician and Japan's first female prefectural governor
- Genki Saito (born 2001), Japanese para swimmer
- Giyo Saito (斎藤 魏洋; 1909–1944), Japanese swimmer
- Saitō Hajime (斎藤 一; 1844–1915), Japanese samurai and Shinsengumi third unit captain
- Harley Saito (ハーレー 斉藤; 1967–2016), Japanese professional wrestler
- Haruka Saito (斎藤 春香; born 1970), Japanese softball player
- Hideko Saito (斎藤 ひで子; born 1950), Japanese cross-country skier
- Hideo Saito, a ring name of Captain New Japan (born 1982), Japanese professional wrestler
- Hideo Saito (musician) (齋藤 秀雄; 1902–1974), Japanese musician
- Hiro Saito (斎藤 弘幸; born 1961), Japanese professional wrestler
- Hiroko Saito (斎藤 弘子; born 1945), Japanese swimmer
- Hiroshi Saito (basketball) (斎藤 博; born 1933), Japanese basketball player
- Hiroshi Saito (diplomat) (斎藤 博; 1886–1939), Japanese diplomat
- Hiroshi Saito (footballer) (斉藤 浩史; born 1970), Japanese footballer
- Hiroshi Saitō (governor) (斎藤 弘; born 1957), Japanese politician from Yamagata, Yamagata Prefecture
- Hiroshi Saito (mathematician) (斎藤 裕; 1947–2010), Japanese mathematician
- Hiroshi Saitō (mayor) (斉藤 博; born 1939), Japanese politician from Tokorozawa, Saitama Prefecture
- Hiroshi Saito (pentathlete) (才藤 浩; born 1961), Japanese modern pentathlete
- Hiroshi Saito (rower) (斎藤 宏; born 1937), Japanese rower
- Hiroya Saito (斉藤 浩哉; born 1970), Japanese ski jumper
- Hisaharu Saito (斉藤 久治; born 1962), Japanese water polo player
- Hitohiro Saito (斎藤 仁弘; born 1957), Japanese teacher of aikido and son of Morihiro Saito
- Hitomi Saito (斉藤 瞳; born 1981), Japanese singer, idol and radio personality
- Hitomi Saito (speed skater) (斎藤 仁美; born 1990), Japanese speed skater
- Hitoshi Saito (斉藤 仁; born 1961), Japanese judoka
- Ichirō Saitō (斎藤 一郎; 1909–1979), Japanese film score composer
- Ikuzo Saito (斎藤 育造; born 1960), Japanese sport wrestler
- James Saito (born 1955), American actor
- Jiro Saito (voice actor) (斉藤 次郎), Japanese voice actor
- Jiro Saito (businessman) (斎藤 次郎; born 1936), Japanese businessman
- Jitsuko Saito (斎藤 実子; born 1946), Japanese speed skater
- Juniti Saito (born 1942), Brazilian military officer and the former commander of the Brazilian Air Force
- Katsuya Saito (斎藤 勝也; born 1940), Japanese cyclist
- Katsuyuki Saito (斎藤 克幸; born 1973), Japanese footballer
- Kazuki Saito (齊藤 和樹; born 1988), Japanese footballer
- Kazuko Saito (斉藤 和子), Japanese communist politician
- Kazumi Saito (斉藤 和巳; born 1977), Japanese baseball player
- Kazuo Saito (斉藤 和夫; born 1951), Japanese footballer and manager
- Kazuo Saito (athlete) (斎藤 和夫; born 1942), Japanese racewalker
- Kazuyoshi Saito (斉藤 和義; born 1966), Japanese singer-songwriter
- Kei Saito (齋藤 慧; born 1996), Japanese speed skater
- Keiko Saito (斉藤 慶子; born 1961), Japanese actress
- Keiko Saito (footballer) (斉藤 圭子), Japanese women's footballer
- Keita Saito (齋藤 恵太; born 1993), Japanese footballer
- Ken Saitō (齋藤 健; born 1959), Japanese politician
- Ken'ichi Saitō (斉藤 健一; born 1972), better known as Hiroshi, Japanese owarai comedian
- Kenkichi Saito (斎藤 兼吉), Japanese swimmer
- Kikuo Saito (1939–2016), Japanese-born American painter
- Kimiko Saitō (斉藤 貴美子; born 1977), Japanese voice actress
- Kiyonori Saito (斎藤 清憲; born 1947), better known as Daisuke Ban, Japanese actor
- Kiyoshi Saitō (artist) (斎藤 清; 1907–1997), Japanese printmaker
- Kiyoshi Saito (table tennis) (斎藤 清; born 1962), Japanese table tennis player
- Kohei Saito (斎藤 幸平; born 1987), Japanese philosopher and historian of economic thought
- Kōichi Saitō (cinematographer) (斉藤 幸一), Japanese cinematographer
- Kōichi Saitō (film director) (斎藤 耕一; 1929–2009), Japanese film director
- Kōichi Saitō (photographer) (齋藤 康一; born 1935), Japanese photographer
- Kōji Saitō (photographer) (斎藤 鵠児; 1893–?), Japanese photographer
- Koji Saito (athlete) (斉藤 晃司), Japanese Paralympic athlete
- Kōsei Saitō (斎藤 光正; 1932–2012), Japanese film director
- Kosuke Saito (斉藤 広祐; born 1983), Japanese DJ and composer
- Kosuke Saito (footballer) (齋藤 功佑; born 1997), Japanese footballer
- Kota Saito (斎藤 宏太; born 1997), Japanese footballer
- Koya Saito (斎藤 広野; born 1986), Japanese footballer
- Kozo Saito, Japanese electrical engineer
- Kunihiko Saitō (斎藤 邦彦), Japanese diplomat
- Kyoji Saito (齋藤 恭司; born 1944), Japanese mathematician
- Kyōko Saitō (齊藤 京子; born 1997), Japanese idol
- Kyujiro Saito (斎藤 久治郎; born 1947), Japanese weightlifter
- Saitō Makoto (斎藤 実; 1858–1936), Imperial Japanese Navy admiral, politician and Prime Minister of Japan
- Makoto Saitō (designer) (サイトウ マコト; born 1952), Japanese graphic designer
- Makoto Saitō (wrestler) (斎藤 誠; born 1974), also known as K-ness., Japanese professional wrestler
- Makoto Saito (amateur wrestler) (斎藤 真; born 1951), Japanese sport wrestler
- Manabu Saitō (齋藤 学; born 1990), Japanese footballer
- Marina Saito (斉藤 真理菜; born 1995), Japanese javelin thrower
- Masaki Saito (baseball) (斎藤 雅樹; born 1965), Japanese baseball player
- Masaki Saito (footballer) (齋藤 将基; born 1980), Japanese footballer
- Masanori Saito (斎藤 昌典; born 1942), better known as Masa Saito, Japanese professional wrestler
- Masaru Saito (齊藤 勝; born 1988), Japanese baseball player
- Masato Saito (斉藤 雅人; born 1975), Japanese footballer
- Masaya Saito (斎藤 雅也; born 1985), Japanese footballer
- Miki Saito (斉藤 美紀; born 1968), Japanese swimmer
- Minoru Saito (斉藤 実; born 1934), Japanese sailor
- Mitsuki Saito (齊藤 未月; born 1999), Japanese footballer
- Miuna Saito (斉藤 美海; born 1987), Japanese pop singer
- Mizuho Saito, the Japanese drummer of ZONE
- Mokichi Saitō (斎藤 茂吉; 1882–1953), Japanese poet
- Momoko Saitō (斎藤 桃子; born 1982), Japanese voice actress
- Momoko Saito (cricketer) (born 1981), Japanese women cricketer
- Morihiko Saito (斎藤 盛彦; born 1961), Japanese mathematician
- Morihiro Saito (斉藤 守弘; 1928–2002), Japanese aikidoka
- Saitō Myōchin (斎藤 妙椿; 1411–1480), Japanese daimyō and monk
- Nana Saitō (齋藤 奈々; born 1988), Japanese model
- Naoko Saito (齋藤 尚子; born 1976), Japanese field hockey player
- Naoto Saito (斉藤 直人; born 1997), Japanese rugby union player
- Neko Saito (斎藤 ネコ; born 1959), Japanese musician
- Nobuharu Saito (齋藤 信治; born 1973), Japanese volleyball player
- Osamu Saito (斎藤 修; born 1938), Japanese rower
- Rika Saito (斎藤 里香; born 1983), Japanese weightlifter
- Rie Saito (斉藤 里恵, born 1984), Japanese politician and writer
- Rin Saitō (斉藤 倫), Japanese manga artist
- Ryo Saito (斎藤 了; born 1979), Japanese professional wrestler
- Ryoei Saito (齊藤 了英; 1916–1996), Japanese businessman and art collector
- Saitō Ryokuu (斎藤 賢; 1867–1904), Japanese writer
- Ryuji Saito (才藤 龍治; born 1993), Japanese footballer
- Ryusei Saito (齊藤 隆成; born 1994), Japanese footballer
- Ryu Saito (齋藤 竜; born 1979), Japanese footballer
- Sachiko Saito (斎藤 幸子; born 1947), Japanese speed skater
- Saizo Saito (斎藤 才三; 1908–2004), Japanese footballer
- Sakae Saitō (斉藤 栄; born 1933), Japanese writer
- Saitō Satoshi (齋藤 聰; 1922–2014), Japanese kobudoka
- Seigo Saito (齋藤 制剛; born 1977), Japanese judoka
- Seiichi Saito (斉藤 誠一; born 1976), Japanese footballer
- Seiji Saito (斉藤 誠司; born 1986), Japanese footballer
- Shigemi Saito (斎藤 繁美; born 1937), Japanese sport shooter
- Shinji Saito (斎藤 慎司; born 1989), Japanese yo-yo performer and competitor
- Shintarō Saitō (斎藤 慎太郎; born 1993), Japanese shogi player
- Shinya Saito (齊藤 慎弥; born 1980), Japanese biathlete
- Shiori Saito (齋藤 栞; born 1998), Japanese badminton player
- Shirō Saitō (斎藤 志郎; born 1956), Japanese actor and voice actor
- Shogo Saitoh (斉藤 彰吾; born 1989), Japanese baseball player
- Shota Saito (footballer, born 1996) (斎藤 翔太), Japanese footballer
- Shuka Saitō (斉藤 朱夏; born 1996), Japanese voice actress
- Sōma Saitō (斉藤 壮馬; born 1991), Japanese voice actor and singer
- Syuusuke Saito (斉藤 秀翼; born 1993), Japanese actor and singer
- Tadashi Saito (斎藤 直; born 1938), Japanese rower
- Taichi Saito (齋藤 太一; born 1993), Japanese badminton player
- Takako Saito (1929–2025), Japanese artist
- Takako Saito (wrestler) (斉藤 貴子; born 1983), Japanese sport wrestler
- Takao Saito (斎藤 隆夫; 1936-2021), Japanese manga artist
- Takao Saito (cinematographer) (斎藤 孝雄; 1929–2014), Japanese cinematographer
- Saitō Takao (politician) (斎藤 隆夫; 1870–1949), Japanese politician
- Takashi Saito (斎藤 隆; born 1970), Japanese baseball pitcher
- Takashi Saito (footballer) (齋藤 恭志; born 1993), Japanese footballer
- Takashi Saito (sumo wrestler) (斉藤 俊; c. 1990 – 2007), Japanese sumo wrestler who died due to injuries sustained in the Tokitsukaze stable hazing scandal
- Takashi Saito (weightlifter) (斎藤 隆; born 1953), Japanese weightlifter
- Takeshi Saito (footballer) (斉藤 武志; born 1979), Japanese footballer
- Takeshi Saito (ice hockey) (齊藤 毅; born 1981), Japanese ice hockey player
- Takeshi Saito (mathematician) (斎藤 毅), Japanese mathematician
- Takeshi Saito (musician) (斎藤 毅; born 1959), Japanese violinist
- Taki Saito (born 2000), Filipino actress
- Taku Saito (斎藤 卓; born 1979), Japanese basketball coach
- Takumi Saito (斎藤 工; born 1981), Japanese actor
- Takumi Saito (racewalker) (born 1993), Japanese racewalker
- Tamaki Saitō (斎藤 環; born 1961), Japanese psychologist
- Tatsuo Saitō (斎藤 達雄; 1902–1968), Japanese actor
- Saitō Tatsuoki (斎藤 右兵衛・大筆 龍興; 1548–1573), Japanese daimyō
- Tetsuo Saito (斉藤 鉄夫; born 1952), Japanese politician
- Tetsuya Saito (斉藤 哲也; born 1983), Japanese ice hockey player
- Tomoharu Saitou (齋藤 友晴; born 1983), Japanese Magic: the Gathering player
- Tomohiro Saitō (齋藤 智裕; born 1984), birth name of Hiro Mizushima, Japanese actor, writer and model
- Saitō Tomonobu (斎藤 朝信; 1527–1591), Japanese samurai
- Tomoyuki Saito, Japanese mixed martial artist
- Torajirō Saitō (斎藤 寅次郎; 1905–1982), Japanese film director
- Toshihide Saito (斉藤 俊秀; born 1973), Japanese footballer and manager
- Saito Toshikazu (齋藤 俊一; died 1582), Japanese samurai
- Saitō Toshimitsu (斎藤 利三; 1534–1582), Japanese samurai
- Saitō Toshinaga (斎藤 利永; died 1460), Japanese daimyō
- Toshitsugu Saito (斉藤 斗志二; born 1944), Japanese politician
- Tsukasa Saito (斎藤 司; born 1979), Japanese comedian
- Tsuneyoshi Saito (斎藤 恒芳; born 1965), Japanese composer and arranger
- William Saito (born 1971), Japanese-American businessman
- Yasuka Saitō (齋藤 ヤスカ; born 1987), Japanese actor
- Yasuo Saitō (diplomat) (齋藤 泰雄; born 1948), Japanese diplomat
- Yasuo Saitō (斎藤 恭央; 1976–2013), better known as Yakkun Sakurazuka, Japanese comedian and voice actor
- Yoot Saito (斉藤 由多加; born 1962), Japanese video game designer
- Yoshifumi Saito (斉藤 好史; born 1958), Japanese water polo player
- Yoshihiko Saito (斎藤 嘉彦; born 1972), Japanese hurdler and sprinter
- Yoshihiro Saito (斉藤 良宏; born 1976), Japanese gymnast
- Yoshishige Saitō (斎藤 義重; 1904–2001), Japanese visual artist
- Saitō Yoshitatsu (斎藤 義龍; 1527–1561), Japanese samurai and daimyō
- Yoshitsugu Saitō (斎藤 義次; 1890–1944), Japanese general
- Yoshiyuki Saito (斉藤 義之; born 1970), better known as Super Shisa, Japanese professional wrestler
- Yōsuke Saitō (斎藤 陽介; born 1988), Japanese footballer
- Yuka Saitō (essayist) (斎藤 由香; born 1962), Japanese essayist
- Yuka Saitō (voice actress) (斉藤 佑圭; born 1986), Japanese voice actress
- Yuki Saito (actress) (斉藤 由貴; born 1966), Japanese singer-songwriter, actress, essayist and poet
- Yuki Saito (pitcher, born 1987) (齊藤 悠葵), Japanese baseball pitcher for the Hiroshima Toyo Carp
- Yuki Saito (pitcher, born 1988) (斎藤 佑樹), Japanese baseball pitcher for the Hokkaido Nippon-Ham Fighters
- Yuriko Saito (斉藤 百合子), professor of philosophy at Rhode Island School of Design
- Yasuka Saitō (齋藤 ヤスカ; born 1987), Japanese actor
- Yuya Saito (斉藤 祐也; born 1977), Japanese rugby union player

== Fictional characters ==
- Saito (Ghost in the Shell) (サイトー), a character in the anime series Ghost in the Shell: Stand Alone Complex
- Saitō (斎藤), a character in the manga series Mitsuboshi Colors
- Colonel Saito, a character in the film The Bridge on the River Kwai
- Saito, a character in the film Inception
- Aaya Saitō (斉藤 亜綾), a character in the OVA series Kuttsukiboshi
- Aoi Saitou (斎藤 葵), a character in the novel series Sound! Euphonium
- Ena Saitō (斉藤 恵那), a character in the manga series Laid-Back Camp
- Saitō Hajime (Rurouni Kenshin) (斎藤 一), a character in the manga series Rurouni Kenshin
- Kaede Saitou (斉藤 楓), a character in the manga series Angelic Layer
- Kaede Saitō (斎藤 楓), a character in the manga series Encouragement of Climb
- Kaori Saito, a character in the manga series Ice Blade
- Nagisa Saito (斉藤 渚), a character in the manga series Squid Girl
- Saito Hikari (Hub Hikari) from the Mega Man Battle Network video game series
- Shimaru Saito (斉藤 終), a character in the manga series Gintama
- Shou Saito, a character in the Black Mirror episode "Playtest"
- Yakumo Saito (斉藤 八雲), a character in the novel series Psychic Detective Yakumo
- Yui Saito (斉藤 結衣), a character in the light novel series And You Thought There Is Never a Girl Online?
- Saito, a character in the anime series Tiger & Bunny

== See also ==
- Saitō Musashibō Benkei (1155–1189), Japanese warrior monk of folklore
- Saitō clan, a Japanese clan during the Sengoku period
