= 1921 in Japan =

- Decades: 1900s; 1910s; 1920s; 1930s; 1940s
- See also: Other events of 1921; History of Japan; Timeline; Years

Events from the year 1921 in Japan. It corresponds to Taishō 10 (大正10年) in the Japanese calendar.

== Incumbents ==
- Emperor: Taishō
- Regent: Hirohito (from November 25)
- Prime Minister:
  - Hara Takashi (until November 4)
  - Takahashi Korekiyo (from November 13)

=== Governors ===
- Aichi Prefecture: Shunji Miyao (until 18 April); Hikoji Kawaguchi (starting 18 April)
- Akita Prefecture: Ryoshin Nao
- Aomori Prefecture:
  - until 9 March: Hidehiko Michioka
  - 9 March-28 September: Shundo Kahei
  - starting 28 September: Yujiro Ozaki
- Ehime Prefecture: Toshio Mawatari (until 27 May); Juunosuke Miyazaki (starting 27 May)
- Fukui Prefecture: Kohei Yuji (until 27 May); Josuke Shiraogawa (starting 27 May)
- Fukuoka Prefecture: Yasukouchi Asakichi
- Fukushima Prefecture: Miyata Mitsuo
- Gifu Prefecture: Kanokogi Kogoro (until 27 May); Manpei Ueda (starting 27 May)
- Gunma Prefecture: Muneyoshi Oshiba
- Hiroshima Prefecture: Raizo Wakabayashi (until 19 July); Ichiro Yoda (starting 19 July)
- Ibaraki Prefecture: Yuichiro Chikaraishi (until 27 May); Genjiro Moriya (starting 27 May)
- Iwate Prefecture: Takeo Kakinuma
- Kagawa Prefecture: Yoshibumi Satake
- Kochi Prefecture: Abe Yoshihiko
- Kumamoto Prefecture: Hikoji Kawaguchi (until 27 May); Sansuke Nakayama (starting 27 May)
- Kyoto Prefecture: Eitaro Mabuchi (until July); Raizo Wakabayashi (starting July)
- Mie Prefecture: Haruki Yamawaki
- Miyagi Prefecture: Mori Masataka (until 27 May); Yuichiro Chikaraishi (starting 27 May)
- Miyazaki Prefecture: Naomiki Hirose (until 3 July); Goro Sugiyama (starting 3 July)
- Nagano Prefecture: Tenta Akaboshi (until 27 May); Tadahiko Okada (starting 27 May)
- Niigata Prefecture: Ota Masahiro
- Okayama Prefecture: Masao Kishimoto
- Okinawa Prefecture: Sōsuke Kawagoe (until 27 May); Jyun Wada (starting 27 May)
- Saga Prefecture: Sawada Ushimaro (until 3 June); Tominaga (starting 3 June)
- Saitama Prefecture: Horiuchi Hidetaro
- Shiname Prefecture: Sanehide Takarabe
- Tochigi Prefecture: Hiroyoshi Hiratsuka
- Tokushima Prefecture: Rinpei Otsu (until month unknown)
- Tokyo: Hiroshi Abe (until 27 May); Katsuo Usami (starting 27 May)
- Toyama Prefecture: Higashizono Motomitsu (until 24 December); Shida Jisho (starting 24 December)
- Yamagata Prefecture: Ichiro Yoda (until 19 July); Morimoto Izumi (starting 19 July)
- Yamanashi Prefecture: Miki Nagano

== Events ==
- January 15 – Mitsubishi Electronics was separate section from Mitsubishi Shipbuildings (now Mitsubishi Heavy Industries) which was founded in Ōsone, Nagoya.
- January Unknown date – Komatsu Limited was founded, as predecessor name was Komatsu Ironworks.
- September – Sempill Mission sent by Britain to Japan, with the objective of helping the Imperial Japanese Navy develop its aeronaval forces.
- October 16 – Janome Sewing Machine founded.
- November 4 – Prime Minister Hara Takashi is assassinated at Tokyo Station.
- November 12 – Washington Naval Conference opens at Memorial Continental Hall Hall in downtown Washington DC.
- November 25 – Crown Prince Hirohito is made regent in place of his ailing father.
- December 13 – In the Four-Power Treaty on Insular Possessions, Japan, the United States, United Kingdom, and France agree to recognize the status quo in the Pacific.
- Termination of Anglo-Japanese Alliance.
- Ladies' Agreement
- Unknown date – Otsuka Pharmaceutical (大塚製薬) founded in Naruto, Shikoku Island.

== Births ==
- January 3 – Natsuko Kahara, actress (d. 1991)
- January 26 – Akio Morita, businessman and co-founder of Sony Corporation (d. 1999)
- February 9 – Junzo Shono, writer (d. 2009)
- February 11 – Edward Seidensticker, scholar, historian, and translator (d. 2007)
- February 14 – Toshiko Taira, textile artist (d. 2022)
- March 19 – Heitaro Nakajima, engineer (d. 2017)
- April 20 – Michiko Inukai, writer and philanthropist (d. 2017)
- December 20 – Kosuke Gomi, novelist (d. 1980)

== Deaths ==
- January 13 – Ijuin Gorō, admiral (b. 1852)
- June 19 – Nabeshima Naohiro, politician and former daimyō (b. 1846)
- September 28 – Yasuda Zenjirō, entrepreneur, founder of the Yasuda zaibatsu (b. 1838)
- November 4 – Hara Takashi, Prime Minister of Japan (b. 1856)
- November 5 – Yusuke Hashiba, archaeologist, historian and anthropologist (b. 1851)
- December 29 – Hayashi Yūzō, politician (b. 1842)

== See also ==
- List of Japanese films of the 1920s
