= Kōji Saitō =

Kōji Saitō may refer to:

- Kōji Saitō (photographer) (斎藤 鵠児, 1893–?), Japanese photographer
- Koji Saito (athlete) (斉藤 晃司), Japanese Paralympic athlete
