= Yasuo Saitō =

Yasuo Saitō may refer to:

- Yasuo Saitō (diplomat) (齋藤 泰雄, born 1948), Japanese diplomat
- Yasuo Saitō (斎藤 恭央, 1976–2013), better known as Yakkun Sakurazuka, Japanese comedian and voice actor
