= Takashi Saito (disambiguation) =

Takashi Saito (斎藤 隆, born 1970) is a Japanese baseball player.

Takashi Saito may also refer to:

- Takashi Saito (footballer) (齋藤 恭志, born 1993), Japanese footballer
- Takashi Saito (sumo wrestler) (斉藤 俊, c. 1990 – 2007), Japanese sumo wrestler who died due to injuries sustained in the Tokitsukaze stable hazing scandal
- Takashi Saito (weightlifter) (斎藤 隆, born 1953), Japanese weightlifter
- Takashi Saito (author) (齋藤 孝, born 1960), Japanese author
