= Kōichi Saitō =

Kōichi Saitō may refer to:

- Kōichi Saitō (photographer) (齋藤 康一, born 1935), Japanese photographer
- Kōichi Saitō (film director) (斎藤 耕一, 1929–2009), Japanese film director
- Kōichi Saitō (cinematographer) (斉藤 幸一), Japanese cinematographer
