= Satarō Fukiage =

Japanese rapist and serial killer

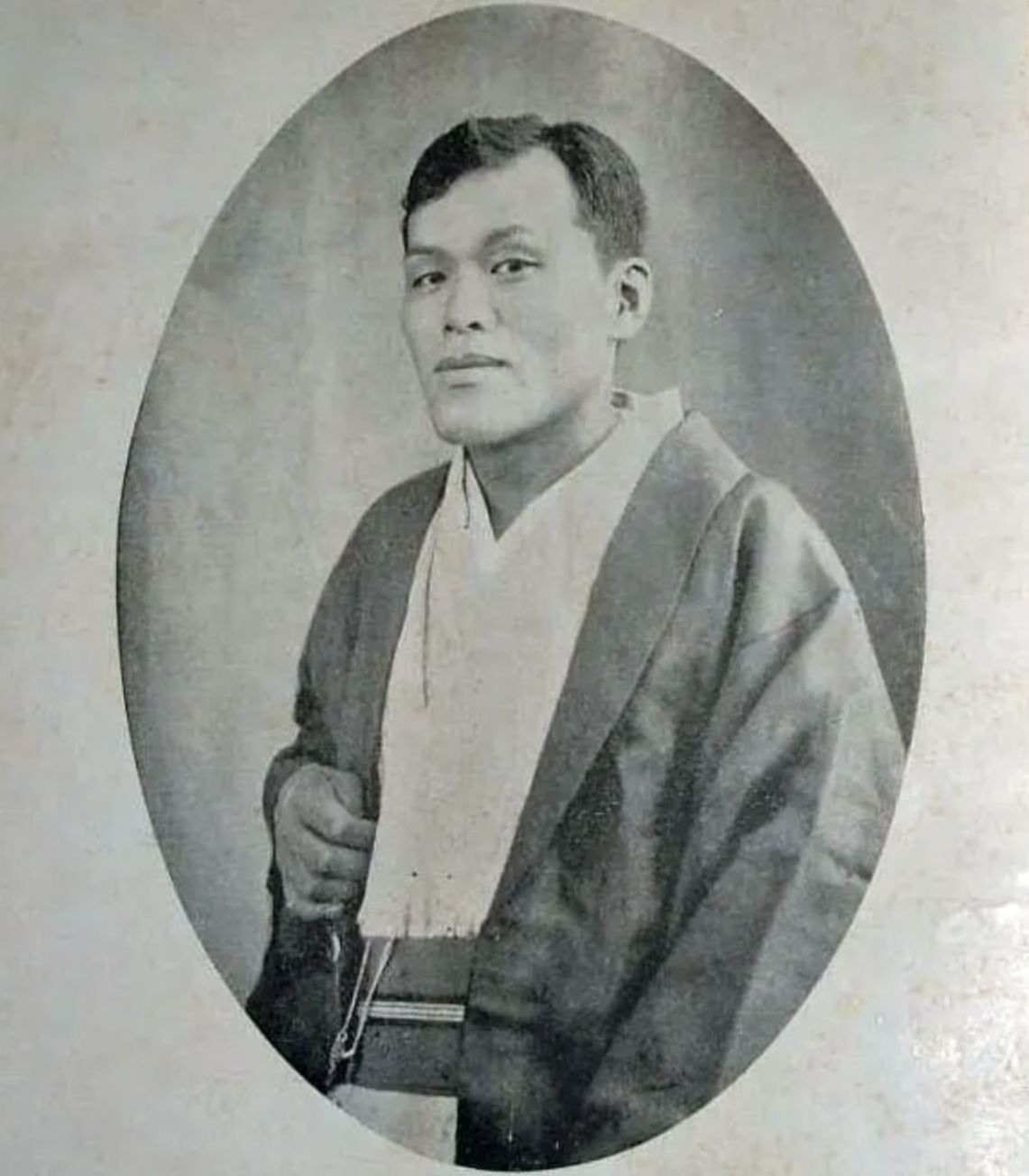
- Born: Satarō Fukiage; February 1, 1889; Kyoto Prefecture, Empire of Japan
- Died: September 28, 1926 (aged 37); Ichigaya Prison, Tokyo, Empire of Japan
- Other name: Shinshūmaro
- Status: Executed by hanging
- Conviction: Murder (7 counts)
- Penalty: Death

Details
- Victims: 7+
- Span of crimes: 1906–1924
- Country: Japan
- States: Kyoto, Gunma, Nagano, Saitama, Chiba
- Date apprehended: 1924

Satarō Fukiage (吹上 佐太郎, Fukiage Satarō; February 1, 1889 – September 28, 1926) was a Japanese rapist and serial killer. He killed at least seven girls. He murdered his first victim in 1906, and killed six girls between 1923 and 1924. He was tried for three out of six cases, but his exact number of victims is unknown.

He raped a number of women besides the murder victims and according to one theory, he raped 93 girls and about 100 women. Some estimates say he raped more than 100 women.

== Early life ==
He was born in Shimogyō-ku, Kyoto. His family forced him to work at the age of eight. His father was a heavy drinker and he would have sex in front of his children. Influenced by this, Satoru began fondling his younger sister's genitals from the age of seven. He frequently changed jobs due to his habit of running off with his wages, which led to him regularly being fired. At the age of 11, while working at a weaving shop, he was molested by a female coworker about 17 years old, for which he lost his job. Fukiage learned kana and math during the two months he spent in jail. He was arrested again for theft soon after his release, but learned classical Chinese while in jail the second time.

Fukiage had sex with a 54-year-old woman at the age of 17. He later raped the woman's 11-year-old daughter and some other girls in their neighborhood.

== First murder and imprisonment ==
On September 24, 1906, he raped and murdered an 11-year-old girl at Kinkaku-ji. The victim was an acquaintance of his. At the time he was culturally considered to be 18 years old, although he was 17 years old under the Western age system. In jail, he studied the works of Confucius, Mencius, Socrates, Aristotle and Nichiren. He was released in 1922 and found employment, but he was fired due to his criminal past. In April 1923, he was arrested for molesting a four-year-old girl, but was released.

== Later murders and arrest ==
Between June 1923 and April 1924, he raped and murdered six girls, ages 11 to 16. He was arrested on July 28, 1924. He confessed to 13 murders, but later recanted, and insisting that he had murdered only six girls and that a police officer had asked him a leading question. He wrote a book, Shaba (娑婆; "The Street"). He was sentenced to death on May 17, 1925. The Supreme Court of Japan upheld his death sentence on July 2, 1926.

== Execution ==
He was executed by hanging on September 28, 1926. The media reported that he went to die nobly, unlike many prisoners. In his book, he requested that parents take care of their children.

== Books ==
- 娑婆 (translation The Street, publisher Ganshodo-shoten, Japan 1926) by himself
- ドキュメント・連続少女殺人―孤高の鬼・吹上佐太郎 (translation Document; Serial Girl Murders—The Isolated Devil, Fukiage Satarō, publisher PAROL-SHA, Japan 1993)
- 身の毛もよだつ殺人者たち (translation Horrible Murderers, publisher Takarajimasha, Japan 2006) - One chapter in the book treats Satarō Fukiage.

== See also ==
- Kiyoshi Ōkubo
- Tsutomu Miyazaki
- List of serial killers by country
