= The Stories of Ibis =

Book by Hiroshi Yamamoto

- Author: Hiroshi Yamamoto
- Original title: アイの物語
- Translator: Takami Nieda
- Language: Japanese (Original); English (translated)
- Genre: Science-fiction
- Publisher: Kadokawa Shoten (Japanese); Viz Media (English)
- Publication date: January 2006 (Japanese); March 2010 (English)
- Publication place: Japan
- Media type: Print (light novel)
- Pages: 465(Japanese); 466(English)
- ISBN: 978-4-04-873621-3 (Japanese); ISBN 978-1-4215-3440-4 (English)

The Stories of Ibis (アイの物語, Ai no Monogatari) is a Japanese science-fiction light novel by Hiroshi Yamamoto (山本 弘) and translated by Takami Nieda. Yamamoto considered this to be an easier read than his earlier science fiction novel 'God Never Keeps Silent' because of its "light novel touch". The light novel was published in Japanese by Kadokawa Shoten and in English by Viz Media under their 'Haikasoru' imprint.

The Stories of Ibis is told through a collection of short stories. All but two had been previously published. The two that Yamamoto wrote for the novel were 'The Day Shion Came' and 'AI's Story'. This is similar to The Illustrated Man by Ray Bradbury. Yamamoto drew from Bradbury's idea of short stories that were loosely connected. He represented this influence in the novel by giving Ibis a facial tattoo.

== Plot ==
The Stories of Ibis begins with a wandering storyteller who encounters Ibis. He has the mindset that all robots are a threat to humanity and must be fought against for survival. He attacks the robot Ibis, not aware of who she is, as a result of his mindset. Ibis tells the storyteller that she is far more proficient in battle. During the battle the storyteller becomes injured and Ibis takes him to an android hospital to care for him. While he is recovering Ibis offers to tell him stories. While originally skeptical he agrees after Ibis makes it clear that the stories are not taboo. The space after each story is referred to as intermission and is a time for Ibis to comment on the story she just told.

=== The Universe on my Hands ===
The story is about a group of friends who are writing a science fiction story over the internet. One of the group members kills someone in real life. The rest of the short story is about how the group fights to convince this man to not commit suicide, but to turn himself in. He resolves to turn himself in, being hopeful to the future because he knows he has friends who care about him. The ending words of the story are a commentary. While the story they were writing was not real, the emotions they were feeling were real.

=== A Romance in Virtual Space ===
This is another story about human interactions over the internet. The device that allows people to enter virtual reality (VR) is MUGEN Net. Such devices are extremely expensive and most people need to go to a public server to use one. However the girl's parents in this story are wealthy enough to own one. This girl is shopping in VR when a boy meets her and asks her out for ice cream. All goes well and they plan for another. After some time of VR dating and awesome adventures with a female heroine, they agree to meet up in real life. He discovers that in reality, she is blind, yet he thinks she is brave and they continue dating. It's a wonderful short story of a secret utopia inside a dystopian culture of technology.

=== Mirror Girl ===
A short story about an artificial intelligence that grows over time with human interaction. The inspiration for this story was Ray Bradbury's I Sing the Body Electric. The mirror girl Shalice starts off with basic knowledge and by interacting with her owner develops. The owner grows up and marries a technician who incubates Shalice by teaching her in the virtual world at many thousand times faster than average life. When he is done, Strong Eye is created. Strong Eye is the fully developed and completely intelligent AI.

=== Black Hole Diver ===
A futuristic story about an artificial space station and people who go diving into a black hole. The space station cannot stop people but is sorry that they go to their deaths because none of them get past the event horizon. Then one girl comes who has the space ship, the training, and the research necessary to attempt to dive into the black hole. As she goes into the black hole the space station can no longer observe. She may have made it, she could have been destroyed.

=== A World Where Justice is Just ===
An anime flavored story about the intelligence of people being scanned onto a computer network. The AIs in the network fight crime and live repeating lives. At the end of each year they start anew, but different story lines. Thousands of 'extras' populate the network and are the ones subject to harm and deletion. The protagonist has a pen pal in real life who explains to her that the real world is under attack and that there are no respawns and no extras. The AI finds this so cruel that people would willingly kill each other when they can't come back.

=== The Day Shion Came ===
The stories leading up to this were all relatively short. This and the next took up over 100 pages each. This is a story about an android named Shion who works in a Japanese nursing facility. Shion comes with only extensive nursing training but lacks the knowledge of how to communicate with the residents. After months of training she informs her adviser that she believes all humans have dementia, which explains their irrational behavior. Near the end of the story one of the residents threatens suicide but Shion convinces him to step down and be rational.

=== AI's Story ===
The culminating story of the entire novel. It is about Ibis herself. She starts off as a virtual reality fighting program and over time develops intelligence. Her master gains enough funds to create her a body in the real world or level 0. There is significant hate against TAIs (True Artificial Intelligence) in the real world. Ibis and her friend Raven rebel against their masters to make a point. Human hatred was destroying them. After many years robots took prevalence and most humans realized they were not worthy to be the guardians of Earth and died in peace. The remaining population was stubborn and fought against the robots for centuries. The storyteller is a child of this generation, being raised in hatred and ignorance. The robots sought to take him captive, and teach him the truth so that he could go to the villages where people lived and teach them the truth. The whole point was they cared for the humans and wanted them to live in peace, rather than fighting for their survival.

== Reception ==
It was reviewed by the Denver Post to be an "excellent novel". Being a Japanese novel translated to English, it has a small audience. The novel was given a 3.85 of 5 by the reviewers at Librarything.com. The reviewers of Google Books gave it a 4.33 of 5.
