= Ichikawa Kumehachi =

Japanese actress

Ichikawa Kumehachi (市川 九女八; 1846–1913) was a Japanese actress.

== Career ==
Ichikawa studied as a kyōgen actress.

In 1858, she made her debut and became the first actress in kabuki theatre since the ban on female actors in 1629, and thus acting as a profession was reintroduced for women in Japan. In 1882, she was accepted as a pupil of Ichikawa Danjūrō IX and took the stage name Ichikawa Masunojō. In 1893, she took her professional name Ichikawa Kumehachi.

== Legacy ==
Ichikawa was followed as a pioneer actress by Kawakami Sadayakko (1872–1946), who in 1903 became the first Japanese actress within modern Western drama. Her successor was Ichikawa Kumehachi II.
