= 1858 in Japan =

- Decades: 1830s; 1840s; 1850s; 1860s; 1870s
- See also: Other events of 1858; History of Japan; Timeline; Years

Events in the year 1858 in Japan.

== Events ==
- 9 April – 1858 Hietsu earthquake
- Start of the Ansei Purge
- Ichikawa Kumehachi make her stage debut as the first actress to appear on stage in Japan since actresses were banned in 1629.

== Incumbents ==
- Monarch: Kōmei
- Shogun: Tokugawa Iesada until August 14, Tokugawa Iemochi starting August 14

== Births ==
- January 25 – Mikimoto Kōkichi (d. 1954), businessman

== Deaths ==
- August 14: Tokugawa Iesada, thirteenth shogun of the Tokugawa Shogunate (1853-1858) (b.1824)
