= Kamehiko Abe =

Japanese politician (1875–1928)

- 阿部 亀彦
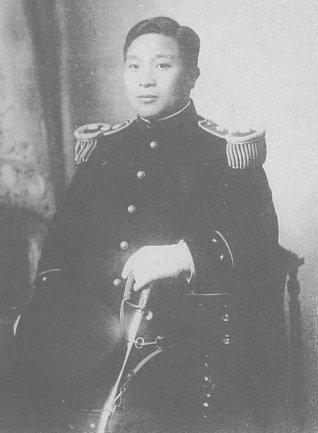

Governor of Hiroshima Prefecture
- In office 16 October 1922 – 25 October 1923
- Monarch: Taishō
- Preceded by: Ichiro Yoda
- Succeeded by: Jiro Yamagata

Governor of Kōchi Prefecture
- In office 18 April 1919 – 16 October 1922
- Monarch: Taishō
- Preceded by: Takeo Kakinuma
- Succeeded by: Toyoji Obata

Personal details
- Born: 1 September 1875 Ōita Prefecture, Japan
- Died: 26 July 1928 (aged 52)
- Education: Tokyo Imperial University

Kamehiko Abe (阿部 亀彦, Abe Kamehiko; September 1875 – 26 July 1928) was a Japanese politician who served as governor of Hiroshima Prefecture from October 1922 to October 1923. He was governor of Kōchi Prefecture (1919–1922).

Preceded by Takeo Kakinuma	Governor of Kōchi Prefecture; 1919-1922	Succeeded by Toyoji Obata
Preceded by Ichiro Yoda	Governor of Hiroshima Prefecture; 1922–1923	Succeeded by Jiro Yamagata
