= Genshō Imanari =

Japanese scholar (1925–2020)

Genshō Imanari (今成 元昭, Imanari Genshō; 30 November 1925 - 10 January 2020) was a scholar of Japanese literature, specializing in Buddhist literature, Japanese medieval war literature and setsuwa. He is a professor emeritus at Rissho University, Japan.

He was born in Tokyo, and graduated from the department of literature of Waseda University. He completed his master's degree from the same university in the year 1951, and completed his PhD in November 1983 from Waseda University. Subsequently, he worked at Kokushikan University, and later at Rissho University until he retired from that university in 1996.

He died on 10 January 2020, aged 94.
