= Kozo Saito =

Kozo Saito is a mechanical engineer, currently the Tennessee Valley Authority Professor in Mechanical Engineering and also the Director of the Institute of Research for Technology Development, at the University of Kentucky, and also a published author.

== Education & Appointments ==
- 1975 B.Sc. - Seikei University Japan
- 1977 MS - Seikei University Japan
- 1980 Ph.D. - Seikei University Japan
- 1980 Assistant Post-graduate Engineer - University of California, San Diego
- 1981 Research Associate and Member of Research Staff - Princeton University
- 1986 Associate Professor - University of Kentucky
- 1993 Professor - University of Kentucky
- 2000 Tennessee Valley Authority Professor in Mechanical Engineering - University of Kentucky
- 2007 Director Institute of Research for Technology Development (IR4TD) - University of Kentucky

== Scholarship and Award ==
Saito's research interest includes combustion (flame synthesis, laminar diffusion flame structure, micro flames, soot formation), fire research (flame spread, fire whirls, boil over, pool and crib fires, scaling laws), scale modeling (law approach, scaling laws, similarity), Monozukuri (Toyota production system, Lean systems, kufu), and engineering philosophy (Zen philosophy, Daoism, D.T. Suzuki). His educational philosophy shares with traditional Japanese Hitozukuri principles and Zen philosophy. Saito has regularly taught two different graduate level courses, ME 563 combustion and ME 565 scale modeling in engineering, where he has practiced engineering philosophy and kufu principles. He has given the Fujio Cho Legacy Lecture at the University of Kentucky's Lean Certification, since 2010. Saito is fellow of American Society of Mechanical Engineers, Chair of International Scale Modeling Committee, former committee member of the National Research Council. His awards include the Richard Emori Award from the second International Symposium on Scale Modeling, International Prize from Combustion Society of Japan.
