= 1856 in Japan =

- Decades: 1830s; 1840s; 1850s; 1860s; 1870s
- See also: Other events of 1856; History of Japan • Timeline • Years

Events in the year 1856 in Japan.

== Incumbents ==
- Monarch: Kōmei
- Shogun: Tokugawa Iesada

== Events ==
- January 28 – The port of Shimoda is opened per Japan's first treaty of amity with Russia. (Traditional Japanese Date: Twenty-first Day of the Twelfth Month, 1855)
