= Tsunenosuke Hamada =

Japanese politician (1870–1945)

- 浜田 恒之助
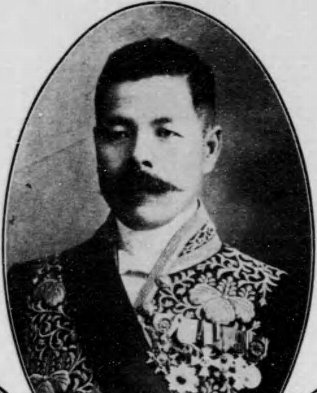

Governor of Kyoto Prefecture
- In office September 1926 – April 1927
- Monarchs: Taishō; Hirohito
- Preceded by: Hiroshi Ikeda
- Succeeded by: Shigoro Sugiyama

Governor of Hiroshima Prefecture
- In office 16 September 1925 – 28 September 1926
- Monarch: Taishō
- Preceded by: Jiro Yamagata
- Succeeded by: Kaiichiro Suematsu

Governor of Miyagi Prefecture
- In office 12 August 1915 – 18 April 1919
- Monarch: Taishō
- Preceded by: Magoichi Tawara
- Succeeded by: Mori Masataka

Governor of Toyama Prefecture
- In office 14 June 1910 – 12 August 1915
- Monarchs: Meiji; Taishō
- Preceded by: Katsuo Usami
- Succeeded by: Sakuzō Kimase

Personal details
- Born: 13 October 1870 Nahari, Tosa, Japan
- Died: 28 April 1945 (aged 74)
- Party: Kenseikai
- Education: Tokyo Imperial University

Tsunenosuke Hamada (浜田 恒之助, Hamada Tsunenosuke; 13 October 1870 – 28 April 1945) was a Japanese politician who served as governor of Hiroshima Prefecture from September 1925 to September 1926. He was governor of Toyama Prefecture (1910–1915), Miyagi Prefecture (1915–1919) and Kyoto Prefecture (1926–1927).

| Preceded by Jiro Yamagata | Governor of Hiroshima Prefecture; 1925–1926 | Succeeded by Kaiichiro Suematsu |
| Preceded by Hiroshi Ikeda | Governor of Kyoto Prefecture; 1926–1927 | Succeeded by Shigoro Sugiyama |
