= Kōichi Saitō (photographer) =

Japanese photographer (born 1935)

Kōichi Saitō (齋藤 康一, Saitō Kōichi; born March 31, 1935 in Shinagawa) is a Japanese photographer.
