= Morio Takahashi =

Japanese politician (1883–1957)

- 高橋 守雄
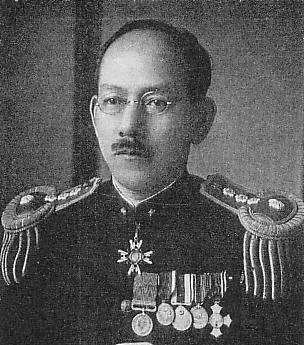

Superintendent General of the Tokyo Metropolitan Police Department
- In office 14 April 1931 – 13 December 1931
- Preceded by: Tsurukichi Maruyama
- Succeeded by: Chō Enren

Chief of General Affairs, Government-General of Taiwan
- In office 17 January 1931 – 14 April 1931
- Governor General: Ōta Masahiro
- Preceded by: Jirō Hitomi
- Succeeded by: Kinoshita Makoto

Mayor of Kumamoto
- In office 19 January 1922 – 13 July 1925
- Preceded by: Sayanagi Tōta
- Succeeded by: Tomoki Karashima
Gubernatorial offices
Governor of Hyōgo Prefecture
In office 5 July 1929 – 20 January 1931
Monarch	Hirohito
Preceded by	Chō Enren
Succeeded by	Masao Oka
Governor of Nagano Prefecture
In office 5 August 1926 – 28 April 1927
Monarchs	Taishō; Hirohito
Preceded by	Mitsusada Umetani
Succeeded by	Ryo Chiba
Governor of Shiga Prefecture
In office 16 September 1925 – 5 August 1926
Monarch	Taishō
Preceded by	Kaiichiro Suematsu
Succeeded by	Shinya Kurosaki

Personal details
- Born: 1 January 1883 Kamimashiki, Kumamoto, Japan
- Died: 6 May 1957 (aged 74) Chūō-ku, Kumamoto, Japan
- Education: Tokyo Imperial University

Morio Takahashi (高橋 守雄, Takahashi Morio; 1 January 1883 – 6 May 1957) was a Japanese politician. He was born in Kumamoto Prefecture. He was a graduate of Tokyo Imperial University. He was mayor of Kumamoto (1922–1925) and governor of Shiga Prefecture (1925–1926), Nagano Prefecture (1926–1927) and Hyōgo Prefecture (1929–1931). In 1931, he served in the Government-General of Taiwan. He served as Superintendent General in 1934.

Preceded by	Mayor of Kumamoto; 1922–1925	Succeeded by
Preceded by Kaiichiro Suematsu	Governor of Shiga Prefecture; 1925–1926	Succeeded by Shinya Kurosaki
Preceded by Mitsusada Umetani	Governor of Nagano; 1926–1927	Succeeded by Ryo Chiba
Preceded by	Governor of Hyōgo Prefecture; 1929–1931	Succeeded by
