= Yoshinobu Nisaka =

Japanese politician

- 仁坂 吉伸
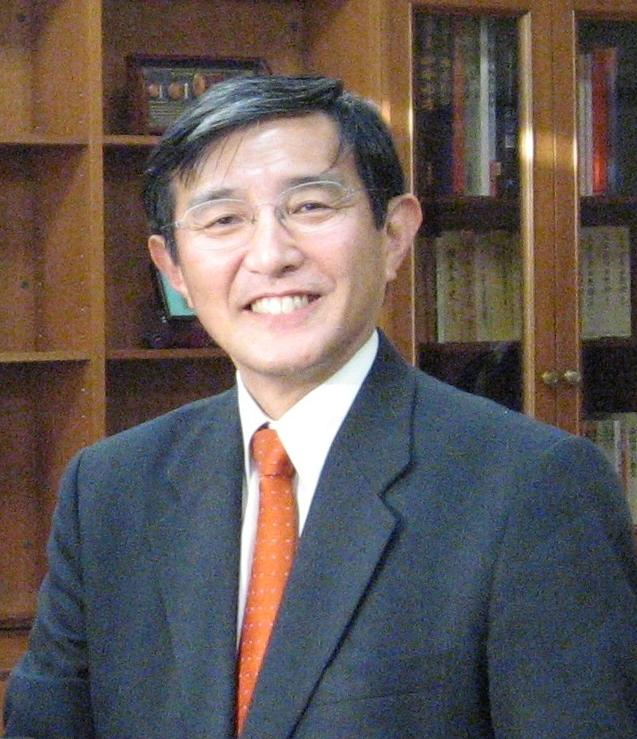
- Nisaka in 2007

Governor of Wakayama Prefecture
- In office 17 December 2006 – 16 December 2022
- Monarchs: Akihito; Naruhito
- Preceded by: Yoshiki Kimura
- Succeeded by: Shūhei Kishimoto

Personal details
- Born: 2 October 1950 (age 76) Wakayama, Japan
- Party: Independent
- Education: University of Tokyo

Yoshinobu Nisaka (仁坂 吉伸, Nisaka Yoshinobu; born 2 October 1950 in Wakayama City) is a former governor of Wakayama Prefecture in Japan. He was first elected in 2006 and served for four terms until 2022.

== Education ==
Nisaka graduated with a B.A. in economics from the University of Tokyo in 1974 and entered MITI that same year.

== Career ==
Yoshinobu Nisaka has been involved in many positions in the Japanese government. From August 2003 to October 2006, Nisaka was Ambassador of Japan to Brunei Darussalam.
