= Kōji Saitō (photographer) =

Japanese photographer

Kōji Saitō (斎藤 鵠児, Saitō Kōji; born 1893, date of death unknown) was a Japanese photographer.
