= Yasuo Saitō (diplomat) =

Japanese diplomat

Yasuo Saitō (齋藤 泰雄, Saitō Yasuo; born 5 January 1948 in Okayama Prefecture) is the Ambassador Extraordinary and Plenipotentiary of Japan to France and a former ambassador of Japan to Russia and Saudi Arabia.
