= Takashi Saito (footballer) =

Japanese footballer

Personal information
- Full name: Takashi Saito
- Date of birth: December 25, 1993 (age 32)
- Place of birth: Niigata, Japan
- Height: 1.73 m (5 ft 8 in)
- Position: Midfielder

Team information
- Current team: Granscena FC

Senior career*
| Years | Team | Apps | (Gls) |
| 2012–2013 | Japan Soccer College | 21 | (6) |
| 2014 | Granscena Niigata | | |
| 2015 | Morioka Zebra | 7 | (3) |
| 2015–2016 | Grulla Morioka | 17 | (0) |
| 2017– | Granscena FC | | |
- * Club domestic league appearances and goals as of December 31, 2015

Takashi Saito (齋藤 恭志, Saitō Takashi; born December 25, 1993 in Niigata) is a Japanese football player. He plays for Grulla Morioka.

== Playing career ==
Takashi Saito joined to Japan Soccer College in 2012. He moved to Granscena Niigata in 2014 and to Morioka Zebra in 2015. In April 2015, he moved to J3 League club; Grulla Morioka.
