= Akiko Dōmoto =

Japanese politician (born 1932)

- 堂本 暁子
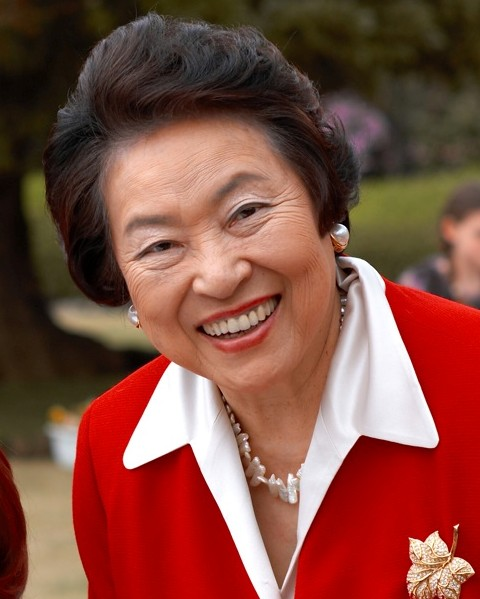
- Dōmoto in 2007

Governor of Chiba Prefecture
- In office 5 April 2001 – 4 April 2009
- Monarch: Akihito
- Preceded by: Takeshi Numata
- Succeeded by: Kensaku Morita

Member of the House of Councillors
- In office 23 July 1989 – 8 March 2001
- Preceded by: Multi-member district
- Succeeded by: Chizuko Kuroiwa
- Constituency: National PR

Personal details
- Born: July 31, 1932 (age 94) San Francisco, California, U.S.
- Party: Independent
- Other political affiliations: JSP (1989–1994); NPS (1994–1999)
- Education: Tokyo Woman's Christian University

Akiko Dōmoto (堂本 暁子, Dōmoto Akiko; born July 31, 1932) is a Japanese politician. She was the governor of Chiba Prefecture in Japan from 2001 to 2009. A graduate of Tokyo Woman's Christian University and Seisen Junior and Senior High School, she was the first female governor of Chiba and the third in Japanese history. She was first elected in 2001. In September 2001 she canceled a controversial plan to reclaim the Sanbanze wetlands as landfill. Historian Jeff Kingston called this act "a major victory for activists."
