= Yoshiya Kakimoto =

Japanese politician

- 柿本善也

Governor of Nara Prefecture
- In office 28 November 1991 – 2 May 2007
- Monarch: Akihito
- Preceded by: Shigeki Ueda
- Succeeded by: Shogo Arai

Personal details
- Born: 7 February 1938 (age 88) Yamatotakada, Nara, Japan
- Education: University of Tokyo

Yoshiya Kakimoto is a Japanese politician. An independent, he served as the governor of Nara Prefecture from 1991 to 2007.

Prior to his career in electoral politics, Kakimoto was employed as director of the administrative affairs bureau in the Ministry of Home Affairs. In April 1990, he became the Vice Governor of Nara Prefecture, and would ascend to the governorship in 1991, when Shigeki Ueda resigned from the office.

In 2009, he was awarded the Order of the Rising Sun.
