= Tominaga =

Tominaga (富永, or; 冨永) is a Japanese surname meaning "eternal prosperity" or "enduring wealth". It is composed of two Kanji characters:

- 富 (Tomi) – "wealth" or "prosperity".
- 永 (Naga) – "eternal" or "enduring".

The surname is common in Japan, with significant presence in regions such as Tokyo, Fukuoka, and Osaka, and is also found in the Japanese diaspora in countries like Brazil and the United States.

== Origin and history ==
The Tominaga surname has roots in feudal Japan, possibly linked to samurai families or merchants who thrived during the Edo period (1603–1868). During this era, the stability of the Tokugawa shogunate fostered economic growth, particularly in cities like Nagoya, located in the Chūbu region, a key commercial hub along the Tōkaidō route. Historical records suggest that Tominaga families may have originated in Aichi Prefecture (Nagoya) or Gifu Prefecture, where they were noted as landowners or artisans. For instance, local chronicles mention figures such as Tominaga Nobumitsu, a samurai active during the Ōnin War (1467–1477), and Tominaga Masahiro, a scholar associated with the Tōdō clan in Ogaki during the Edo period.

Academic research, such as studies available in Japan's CiNii repository, indicates that surnames with auspicious meanings like "Tominaga" were often adopted by families of prominence in feudal times. Additionally, discussions on X suggest that the surname's presence in Gifu may be tied to the traditional production of Mino washi paper, a regional craft. In the 20th century, the surname gained prominence across various fields, including arts, sports, and philosophy, reflecting the diverse contributions of its bearers.

== Notable people ==
- Ai Tominaga (冨永 愛; born 1982), Japanese fashion model and actress.
- Geovanna Tominaga (born 1980), Brazilian actress and television host of Japanese descent.
- Hideaki Tominaga (富永 英明; born 1976), Japanese footballer.
- Hiroyuki Tominaga (富永 啓之; born 1973), Japanese basketball player.
- Keisei Tominaga (富永 啓生; born 2001), Japanese basketball player, competed in the Tokyo 2020 Olympics.
- Kenji Tominaga (富永 研司; born 1970), Japanese actor.
- Koyomi Tominaga (冨永 こよみ; born 1989), Japanese volleyball player.
- Masanori Tominaga (冨永 昌敬; born 1975), Japanese film director, known for The Echo of Astro Boy’s Footsteps.
- Miina Tominaga (冨永 みーな; born 1966), Japanese voice actress, known for roles in Sazae-san and Rurouni Kenshin.
- Risaburo Tominaga (富永 利三郎; born 1930), Japanese sport wrestler.
- Shozo Tominaga (富永 正三; died 2002), Japanese war criminal and later peace activist.
- Tominaga Nakamoto (富永 仲基; 1715–1746), Japanese philosopher of the Edo period.

== Distribution ==
According to estimates, Tominaga ranks as the 8,221st most common surname worldwide, with approximately 67,606 bearers in Japan (a concentration of 1 in 1,891 people). Outside Japan, it is notable in countries with Japanese immigration, such as the United States (401 occurrences in the 2010 census) and Brazil.

== See also ==
- Takahashi – another common Japanese surname
- Tominaga Dam, a dam in Aichi Prefecture, Japan
