= Takahiko Yamamoto =

Japanese politician (1935–2023)

- 山本 栄彦

Governor of Yamanashi Prefecture
- In office February 2, 2003 – February 17, 2007
- Monarch: Akihito
- Preceded by: Kunio Tanabe
- Succeeded by: Shōmei Yokouchi

Mayor of Kōfu
- In office February 4, 1991 – February 27, 2002
- Preceded by: Chūzō Hara
- Succeeded by: Masanobu Miyajima

Personal details
- Born: September 9, 1935 Kōfu, Yamanashi, Japan
- Died: April 9, 2023 (aged 87) Nirasaki, Yamanashi, Japan
- Party: Independent

Takahiko Yamamoto (山本 栄彦, Yamamoto Takahiko; September 9, 1935 – April 9, 2023) was a Japanese politician. He served as the governor of Yamanashi Prefecture for one term from February 2003 to February 2007. Prior to that office, he served as Mayor of Kōfu for three terms from 1991 to 2002.

Yamamoto graduated from the Faculty of Business at Meiji University.

Yamamoto was repeatedly hospitalized in 2022 and 2023. He died in Nirasaki, Yamanashi Prefecture, on the morning of April 9, 2023, at the age of 87.

Political offices
Preceded by Kunio Tanabe	Governor of Yamanashi Prefecture; 2003–2007	Succeeded by Shōmei Yokouchi
