= Yoshihiro Katayama =

Japanese politician

- 片山 善博
- Official portrait, 2010

Minister for Internal Affairs and Communications
- In office 17 September 2010 – 2 September 2011
- Prime Minister: Naoto Kan
- Preceded by: Kazuhiro Haraguchi
- Succeeded by: Tatsuo Kawabata

Governor of Tottori Prefecture
- In office 13 April 1999 – 12 April 2007
- Monarch: Akihito
- Preceded by: Yuuji Nishio
- Succeeded by: Shinji Hirai

Personal details
- Born: 29 July 1951 (age 75) Seto, Okayama, Japan
- Party: Independent
- Other political affiliations: Democratic
- Education: University of Tokyo

Yoshihiro Katayama (片山 善博, Katayama Yoshihiro; born 29 July 1951) is a former Japanese politician who served as the Minister of Internal Affairs and Communications in the Kan Cabinet from September 2010 through to September 2011. He was the governor of Tottori Prefecture from 1999 to 2007.

Political offices
Preceded by Kazuhiro Haraguchi	Minister for Internal Affairs and Communications; 2010–2011	Succeeded by Tatsuo Kawabata
