= Takakazu Ishii =

Japanese politician

- 石井 隆一
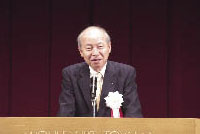

Governor of Toyama Prefecture
- In office 9 November 2004 – 9 November 2020
- Monarchs: Akihito; Naruhito
- Preceded by: Yutaka Nakaoki
- Succeeded by: Hachiro Nitta

Personal details
- Born: 15 December 1945 (age 80) Toyama City, Toyama, Japan
- Education: University of Tokyo

Takakazu Ishii (石井 隆一, Ishii Takakazu; born 15 December 1945) is a Japanese politician and a former governor of Toyama Prefecture in Japan, first elected in 2004. A native of Toyama, Toyama and a graduate of the University of Tokyo, he worked in the Ministry of Home Affairs from 1969 before being elected governor.
