= Jiro Yamagata =

Japanese politician

- 山県 治郎
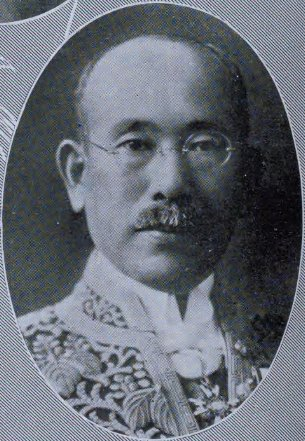

Governor of Kanagawa Prefecture
- In office 5 July 1929 – 28 December 1931
- Monarch: Hirohito
- Preceded by: Hiroshi Ikeda
- Succeeded by: Endō Ryūsaku

Governor of Hyōgo Prefecture
- In office 16 September 1925 – 17 May 1927
- Monarchs: Taishō; Hirohito
- Preceded by: Hiratsuka Hiroyoshi
- Succeeded by: Chō Enren

Governor of Hiroshima Prefecture
- In office 25 October 1923 – 16 September 1925
- Monarch: Taishō
- Preceded by: Kamehiko Abe
- Succeeded by: Tsunenosuke Hamada

Governor of Ishikawa Prefecture
- In office 16 October 1922 – 25 October 1923
- Monarch: Taishō
- Preceded by: Ushimaro Sawada
- Succeeded by: Kyūichi Hasegawa

Personal details
- Born: 6 January 1881 Yamaguchi Prefecture, Japan
- Died: 9 January 1936 (aged 55)
- Education: Tokyo Imperial University

Jiro Yamagata (6 January 1881 – 9 January 1936) was a Japanese politician who served as governor of Hiroshima Prefecture from October 1923 to September 1925. He was also governor of Ishikawa Prefecture (1922–1923), Hyōgo Prefecture (1925–1927), and Kanagawa Prefecture (1929–1931).

Preceded by	Governor of Ishikawa Prefecture; 1922-1923	Succeeded by
Preceded by Kamehiko Abe	Governor of Hiroshima Prefecture; 1923–1925	Succeeded by Tsunenosuke Hamada
Preceded by	Governor of Kanagawa Prefecture; 1929-1931	Succeeded by
