= Masaaki Kanda =

Japanese politician

- 神田 真秋

Governor of Aichi Prefecture
- In office 15 February 1999 – 14 February 2011
- Monarch: Akihito
- Preceded by: Reiji Suzuki
- Succeeded by: Hideaki Ōmura

Mayor of Ichinomiya
- In office 12 November 1989 – 15 December 1998
- Preceded by: Sekitarō Mori
- Succeeded by: Kazuo Tani

Personal details
- Born: 1 October 1951 (age 75) Ichinomiya, Aichi, Japan
- Party: Independent
- Education: Chuo University

Masaaki Kanda (神田 真秋, Kanda Masaaki; born 1 October 1951) is a Japanese politician who served as governor of Aichi Prefecture from 1999 to 2011. A graduate of Chuo University, he served as mayor of Ichinomiya for three terms from 1989 to 1998 before he was first elected governor of Aichi Prefecture in 1999.

Preceded by Reiji Suzuki	Governor of Aichi Prefecture; 1999–2011	Succeeded by Hideaki Ōmura
