= Akihiko Noro =

Japanese politician

- 野呂 昭彦

Governor of Mie Prefecture
- In office 21 April 2003 – 20 April 2011
- Monarch: Akihito
- Preceded by: Masayasu Kitagawa
- Succeeded by: Eikei Suzuki

Mayor of Matsusaka
- In office April 2000 – 25 March 2003
- Preceded by: Kiyoharu Okuda
- Succeeded by: Takeshi Shimomura

Member of the House of Representatives
- In office 19 December 1983 – 27 September 1996
- Preceded by: Kyōichi Noro
- Succeeded by: Constituency abolished
- Constituency: Mie 2nd

Personal details
- Born: 28 August 1946 (age 80) Iitaka, Mie, Japan
- Party: Independent
- Other political affiliations: LDP (1983–1994); NFP (1994–1997); LP (1998–2000)
- Parent: Kyōichi Noro (father)
- Education: Keio University

Akihiko Noro (野呂 昭彦, Noro Akihiko; born 28 August 1946) is a Japanese politician, most recently serving as the governor of Mie Prefecture from 2003 until 2011. A native of Iitaka, Mie, Noro attended Keio University and obtained a Bachelor of Engineering degree. In 1979 he commenced his political career by becoming secretary to his father Kyōichi Noro, who had just been appointed as Minister of Health and Welfare in the cabinet of Prime Minister Masayoshi Ōhira.

In 1983 Kyōichi announced his retirement from politics, leaving Akihiro to contest his seat in the Mie No.2 district in the December 1983 general election. Akihiro was successful in the election and served in the House of Representatives in the Diet (national legislature) for four terms from 1983 until 1996. Electoral reforms introduced in 1993 saw the old system of multi-member constituencies abolished. Noro contested the newly created Mie 4th district at the 1996 general election but lost to Norihisa Tamura. Noro then successfully contested the April 2000 mayoral election in Matsusaka. He resigned in April 2003 whilst still in his first term in order to contest the Mie gubernatorial election.
