= Masao Oka =

Japanese ethnologist and Japanologist

- Born: June 5, 1898; Japan Nagano, Matsumoto
- Died: December 15, 1982 (aged 84)
- Other name: 岡 正雄
- Occupations: Japanese ethnologist and Japanologist

Masao Oka (岡 正雄, Oka Masao; 1898–1982) was a Japanese ethnologist and Japanologist. Oka is considered the leading figure in the establishment of Japanese ethnology since the 1930s.

== Biography ==
He was born in Matsumoto, Nagano Prefecture. He was a graduate of the University of Tokyo and Tohoku University. He served on the faculty of Meiji University, Kanagawa Dental University, Wayo Women's University, Tokyo Metropolitan University and Tokyo University of Foreign Studies.

He died on 15 December 1982 in Tokyo.
