= Yoshiko Shiotani =

Japanese politician (born 1939)

- 潮谷 義子
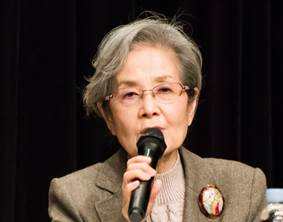
- Shiotani in 2021

Governor of Kumamoto Prefecture
- In office 16 April 2000 – 15 April 2008
- Monarch: Akihito
- Preceded by: Jōji Fukushima
- Succeeded by: Ikuo Kabashima

Personal details
- Born: 5 April 1939 (age 87) Saga Prefecture, Japan
- Education: Japan College of Social Work

Yoshiko Shiotani (潮谷 義子, Shiotani Yoshiko; born 5 April 1939) is a Japanese former politician who served as the governor of Kumamoto Prefecture in Japan from 2001 to 2009. She was Kumamoto's first female governor and the second in Japanese history.

She is a member of the Japan Evangelical Lutheran Church.
