= Kaiichiro Suematsu =

Japanese politician (1875–1947)

- 末松 偕一郎
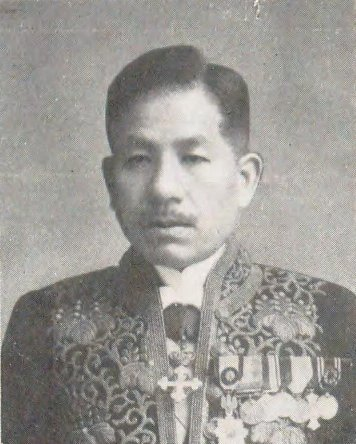
- Suematsu in 1931

Mayor of Beppu
- In office 20 October 1942 – 19 October 1946
- Preceded by: Shigehachiro Hirayama
- Succeeded by: Tetsuichi Waki

Member of the House of Representatives
- In office 16 January 1934 – 29 April 1942
- Preceded by: Daisuke Sakai
- Succeeded by: Multi-member district
- Constituency: Fukuoka 4th
- In office 20 February 1928 – 21 January 1932
- Preceded by: Constituency established
- Succeeded by: Shirō Koike
- Constituency: Fukuoka 4th
Gubernatorial offices
Governor of Hiroshima Prefecture
In office 28 September 1926 – 7 November 1927
Monarchs	Taishō; Hirohito
Preceded by	Tsunenosuke Hamada
Succeeded by	Sukenari Yokoyama
Governor of Ibaraki Prefecture
In office 16 September 1925 – 28 September 1926
Monarch	Taishō
Preceded by	Daisaburō Tsugita
Succeeded by	Kihachirō Itō
Governor of Shiga Prefecture
In office 25 October 1923 – 16 September 1925
Monarch	Taishō
Preceded by	Horita Gijirō
Succeeded by	Morio Takahashi
Governor of Tokushima Prefecture
In office 5 March 1915 – 26 September 1917
Monarch	Taishō
Preceded by	Riheita Kameyama
Succeeded by	Gennosuke Miyake

Personal details
- Born: 18 June 1875
- Died: 26 June 1947 (aged 72)
- Party: Rikken Minseitō
- Education: Tokyo Imperial University

Kaiichiro Suematsu (18 June 1875 – 26 June 1947) was a Japanese politician who served as governor of Hiroshima Prefecture from September 1926 to November 1927. He was governor of Tokushima Prefecture (1915–1917), Shiga Prefecture (1923–1925) and Ibaraki Prefecture (1925–1926). He was mayor of Beppu, Ōita from 1942 to 1946.

Preceded by Tsunenosuke Hamada	Governor of Hiroshima Prefecture; 1926–1927	Succeeded by Sukenari Yokoyama
