= List of governors of Shiga Prefecture =

This is a list of governors of the Shiga Prefecture, Japan.

== Appointed ==
- Matsuda Michiyuki 1871-1875
- Koteda Yasusada 1875-1884
- Kojiro Iwasaki 1890-1891
- Orita Heinai 1897-1899
- Sada Suzuki 1902-1907
- Kaiichiro Suematsu 1923-1925
- Morio Takahashi 1925-1926
- Shinya Kurosaki 1926-1927
- Inada Syūichi 1945-1946

== Elected ==
- Iwakichi Hattori 1947-1954
- Kotaro Mori 1954-1958
- Kyujiro Taniguchi 1958-1966
- Kinichiro Nozaki 1966-1974
- Masayoshi Takemura 1974-1986
- Minoru Inaba 1986-1998
- Yoshitsugu Kunimatsu 1998-2006
- Yukiko Kada 2006-2014
- Taizō Mikazuki 2014–present
