= List of operas by Japanese composers =

This list is of operas by Japanese composers.

== List ==
Opera	Composer	Librettist	Première		Alternative name(s)	Comments	Image	Gojūon	Ref.
Opera	Composer	Librettist	Year	Venue	Alternative name(s)	Comments	Image	Gojūon	Ref.
Camp Dream 露営の夢; Roei no Yume	Kitamura Sueharu		1905	Kabuki-za				ロエイノ	
Hagoromo 羽衣; Hagoromo	Komatsu Kōsuke		1906		Feather Robe	cf. Hagoromo		ハゴロモ	
Eternal Darkness 常闇; Tokoyami	Tōgi Tetteki		1906	Kabuki-za				トコヤミ	
霊鐘; Reishō	Komatsu Kōsuke		1907	Ushigome Kōtō Engei-kan (牛込高等演芸館)				レイショ	
小歌劇《誓いの星》 ko-kageki Chikai no Hoshi	Yamada Kōsaku		1909					チカイノ	
Fairy opera "Dom-Brako" 御伽歌劇 《ドンブラコ》 otogi kageki Don-burako	Kitamura Sueharu		1912	Kabuki-za		"children's operetta"		ドンブラ	
Uta-asobi "Ukare-Daruma" 歌遊び 《うかれ達磨》 uta-asobi Ukare-Daruma	Motoori Nagayo		1912					ウカレダ	
Women go to War 女軍出征; Jogun shussei	Iba Takashi		1917	Tokiwa-za				ジョグン	
Ochitaru Tennyo 楽劇《堕ちたる天女》 gakugeki Ochitaru tennyo	Yamada Kōsaku	Tsubouchi Shōyō	1929	Kabuki-za	Fallen Angel; The Fallen Celestial Maiden			オチタル	
Ayame あやめ; Ayame	Yamada Kōsaku	Percy Noel	1931		Sweet Flag			アヤメ	
Onatsu Kyōran 日本歌劇 《お夏狂乱》 Nihon kageki Onatsu kyōran	Sekiya Toshiko		1934					オナツキ	
二人葛葉; Futari kuzuba	Sekiya Toshiko		1935					フタリク	
Alt-Heidelberg アルト ハイデルベルヒ; Aruto Haideruberuhi	Iida Nobuo		1937	Hibiya Public Hall		based on Alt Heidelberg		アルトハ	
Katsushika Love Story 葛飾情話; Katsushika jōwa	Sugahara Meirō	Nagai Kafū	1938	Asakusa Operakan	Romance in Katsushika			カツシカ	
Kurofune 黒船; Kurofune	Yamada Kōsaku		1940	Tokyo Takarazuka Theatre	Dawn (夜明け, Yoake)	cf. Black Ships		クロフネ	
Tomoe Gozen 巴御前; Tomoe Gozen	Sekiya Toshiko		1941			cf. Tomoe Gozen		トモエゴ	
The God of Nishiura 国民歌劇《西浦の神》 Kokumin kageki Nishiura no Kami	Hirota Ryūtarō		1943					ニシウラ	
Yūzuru 夕鶴; Yūzuru	Dan Ikuma	Kinoshita Junji	1952	Osaka Asahi Kaikan	The Twilight Crane			ユウヅル	
Shuzenji Monogatari 修禅寺物語; Shuzenji monogatari	Shimizu Osamu		1954	Osaka Asahi Kaikan	A Mask Maker's Story	based on Shuzenji Monogatari by Okamoto Kidō		シュゼン	
The Scarlet Cloak 赤い陣羽織; Akai jinbaori	Ōguri Hiroshi		1955			based on The Scarlet Cloak by Kinoshita Junji		アカイジ	
Clairvoyant Monkey Painter ニホンザル・スキトオリメ; Nihon-zaru sukitoorime	Mamiya Michio	Kijima Hajime	1966					ニホンザ	
Okinawa 沖縄; Okinawa			1969			cf. United States Civil Administration of the Ryukyu Islands		オキナワ	
Luminous Moss ひかりごけ; Hikarigoke	Dan Ikuma		1972		Hikarigoke	based on Hikarigoke by Takeda Taijun		ヒカリゴ	
Shunkinshō 春琴抄; Shunkin-shō	Miki Minoru	Maeda Jun	1975	Tokyo Yūbin Chokin Hall		based on Shunkinshō by Tanizaki Jun'ichirō		シュンキ	
Hsiang Fei グランド・オペラ 《香妃》 gurando opera Kōhi	Yamada Kōsaku	Ōki Atsuo, Yamada Kōsaku	1981	Tokyo Bunka Kaikan		cf. Fragrant Concubine		コウヒ	
Jōruri じょうるり; Jōruri	Miki Minoru	Colin Graham	1985	Opera Theatre of Saint Louis		cf. Jōruri		ジョウル	
Wakahime ワカヒメ; Wakahime	Miki Minoru	Nakanishi Rei	1992	Okayama Symphony Hall		cf. Kibi no Wakahime		ワカヒメ	
Silence 沈黙; Chinmoku	Matsumura Teizō	Matsumura Teizō	1993	Nissay Theatre		based on Silence		チンモク	
Takeru 建・TAKERU; Takeru	Dan Ikuma	Dan Ikuma	1997	New National Theatre, Tokyo		based on the story of Yamato Takeru		タケル	
The Tale of Genji 源氏物語; Genji monogatari	Miki Minoru	Colin Graham	2000	Opera Theatre of Saint Louis		based on The Tale of Genji		ゲンジモ	
Rokumeikan 鹿鳴館; Rokumeikan	Ikebe Shin'ichirō	Uyama Hitoshi	2010	New National Theatre, Tokyo		based on Rokumeikan by Mishima Yukio		ロクメイ	
Shinran: Life is impermanent like an illusion 親鸞 幻のごとくなる一期; Shin ran maboroshi no gotoku naru ichigo	Ōtani Senshō	Kagetsu Makoto	2011	Kyoto Concert Hall		cf. Shinran		シンラン	
Bamboo Princess 竹取物語; Taketori monogatari	Numajiri Ryūsuke	Numajiri Ryūsuke	2014	Yokohama Minato Mirai Hall		based on Taketori Monogatari		タケトリ	
A Story of Chiune-Sugihara 杉原千畝物語 人道の桜; Sugihara Chiune monogatari jindō no sakura	Andō Yūki (安藤由布樹)	Shinada Yuri	2015			cf. Chiune Sugihara		スギハラ	
Asters 紫苑物語; Shion monogatari	Nishimura Akira	Sasaki Mikirō	2019	New National Theatre, Tokyo		based on Asters by Ishikawa Jun		シオンモ	
Kurenai Tennyo スーパーオペラ《紅天女》 sūpā opera Kurenai Tennyo	Terashima Tamiya	Miuchi Suzue	2020	Bunkamura Orchard Hall	Red Goddess	based on Glass Mask		クレナイ	

== See also ==
- List of Japanese composers
