= Wild grass =

Wild grass may refer to:

- Grass that is uncultivated.
- Wild Grass, the English-language title of Les Herbes folles, a 2009 film directed by Alain Resnais.
- Wild Grass (poetry collection), a 1927 collection of work by Lu Xun
