= Bamboo Princess =

2014 opera by Numajiri Ryūsuke

- Opera by Numajiri Ryūsuke
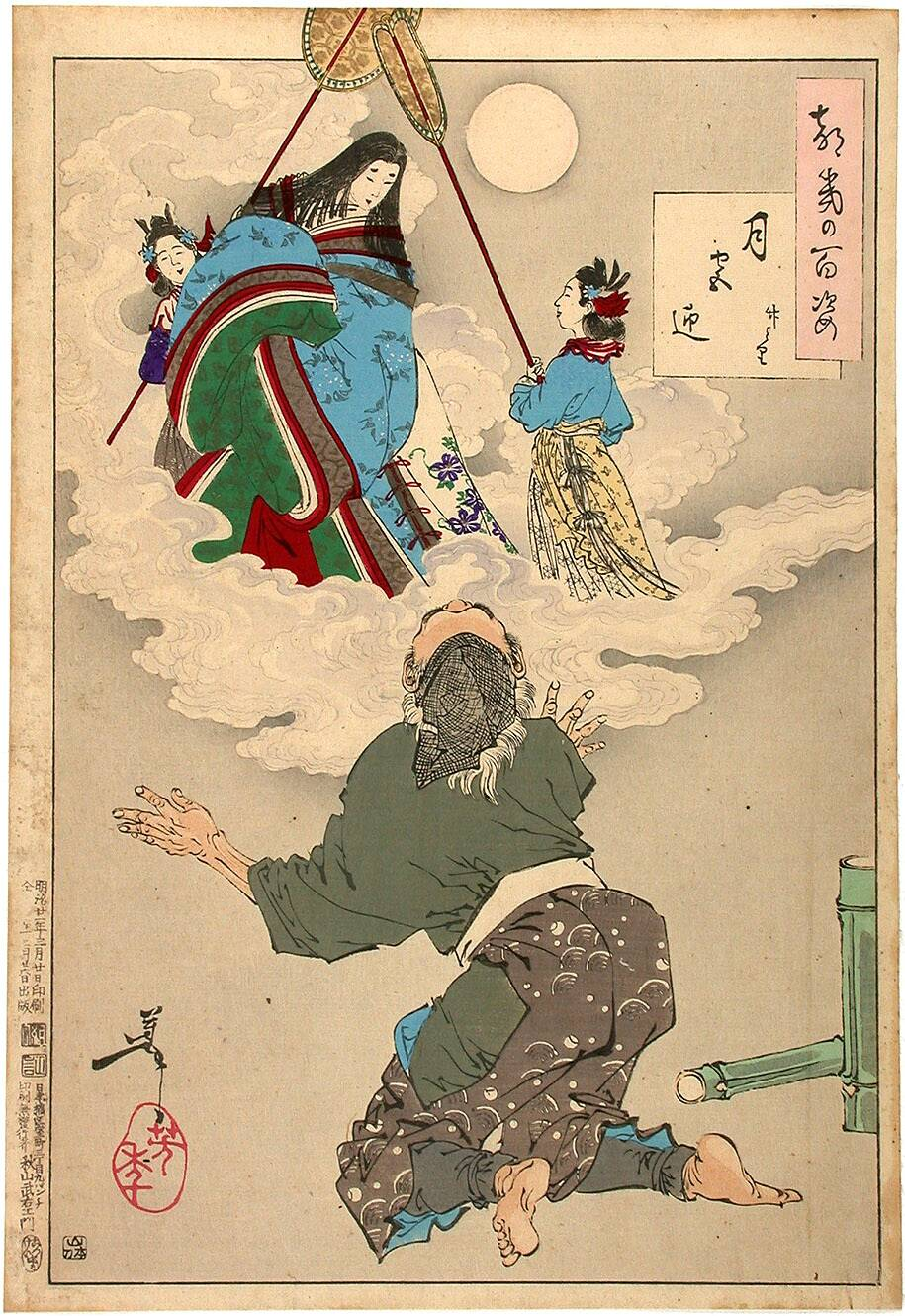
- Received back into Moon Palace (月宮迎), an 1888 print from the series One Hundred Aspects of the Moon by Tsukioka Yoshitoshi
- Librettist: Numajiri Ryūsuke
- Language: Japanese
- Based on: The Tale of the Bamboo Cutter
- Premiere: 18 January 2014; Yokohama Minato Mirai Hall

The Bamboo Princess (歌劇「竹取物語」, Kageki "Taketori Monogatari") is an opera in five scenes or acts composed by Numajiri Ryūsuke to a Japanese libretto by the composer, based on the late ninth- or early tenth-century Tale of the Bamboo Cutter. First performed in 2014, it has a running time of approximately two hours. While the libretto is faithful to the original story, the "beautiful" score is reminiscent of popular tunes of the Shōwa era. The orchestration includes parts for harp, celesta, and horagai.

== Synopsis ==
One day, in a bamboo forest, an old bamboo-cutter comes across a shining stalk of bamboo, inside which, when cut open, he finds a young girl. Raised as their own by the old man and his wife, who name her Kaguya-hime, the girl grows into a beautiful young woman. Five princes, hearing of the beauteous maiden, wish to marry her; she tells them she will marry the one who brings her the treasure she seeks. Hearing of her beauty, the Emperor also wishes to marry her and for three years writes to her. Kaguya-hime gazes at the Moon in tears and tells the old man that from the Moon she came and to the Moon she must return. Presenting the Emperor with an elixir of immortality as a parting gift, and bidding a sad farewell, Kaguya-hime returns to the Moon. Without her, the Emperor has no wish for the elixir, takes it to the highest mountain, and immolates it—Mount Fuji thus taking on the mantle of immortality.

== Characters ==
The opera has the following roles:

- Kaguya-hime (Princess Kaguya, found in a shining bamboo stalk)
- Okina (an old bamboo-cutter, who finds and raises Kaguya-hime)
- Ouna (an old woman, wife of the bamboo-cutter)
- Mikado (the Emperor, who wishes for Kaguya-hime as his consort)
- Ishitsukuri-no-Miko (prince and suitor, tasked with obtaining the Buddha's begging bowl)
- Kuramochi-no-Miko (prince and suitor, tasked with obtaining a jewelled branch from the Isle of Horai)
- Abe-no-Miushi (prince, suitor, and Minister of the Right, tasked with obtaining a fire rat pelt robe)
- Ōtomo-no-Miyuki (prince, suitor, and Great Counsellor, tasked with obtaining a coloured jewel from the neck of a dragon)
- Isonokami-no-Marotari (prince, suitor, and Middle Counsellor, tasked with obtaining the shell of a cowrie born of a swallow)
- Envoy from the Moon (with whom Kaguya-hime must return)
- General (tasked by the Emperor with driving off the envoy(s) from the Moon)
- Craftsmen (who make the jewel branch of Horai)

== Performance history ==
Following a concert performance at Yokohama Minato Mirai Hall in 2014, two performances were staged at the Hanoi Opera House with the Vietnam National Symphony Orchestra in 2015. The staged Japanese première was at the Biwako Hall Center for the Performing Arts, Shiga later the same year. Further performances at the Biwako Hall and New National Theatre, Tokyo in 2020 were cancelled on public health grounds, but a semi-staged performance went ahead at the Biwako Hall in 2022. In 2024 it was performed with soprano Sunagawa Ryōko in the title role at the Biwako Hall with the Japan Century Symphony Orchestra, Sapporo Concert Hall Kitara with the Sapporo Symphony Orchestra, and Yamagin Kenmin Hall with the Yamagata Symphony Orchestra.

== See also ==
- The Tale of the Princess Kaguya (2013 film)
- Princess from the Moon (1987 film)
- Princess Kaguya (1935 film)
- Heian literature
