= Nihon University Yamagata Senior High School =

- 日本大学山形高等学校
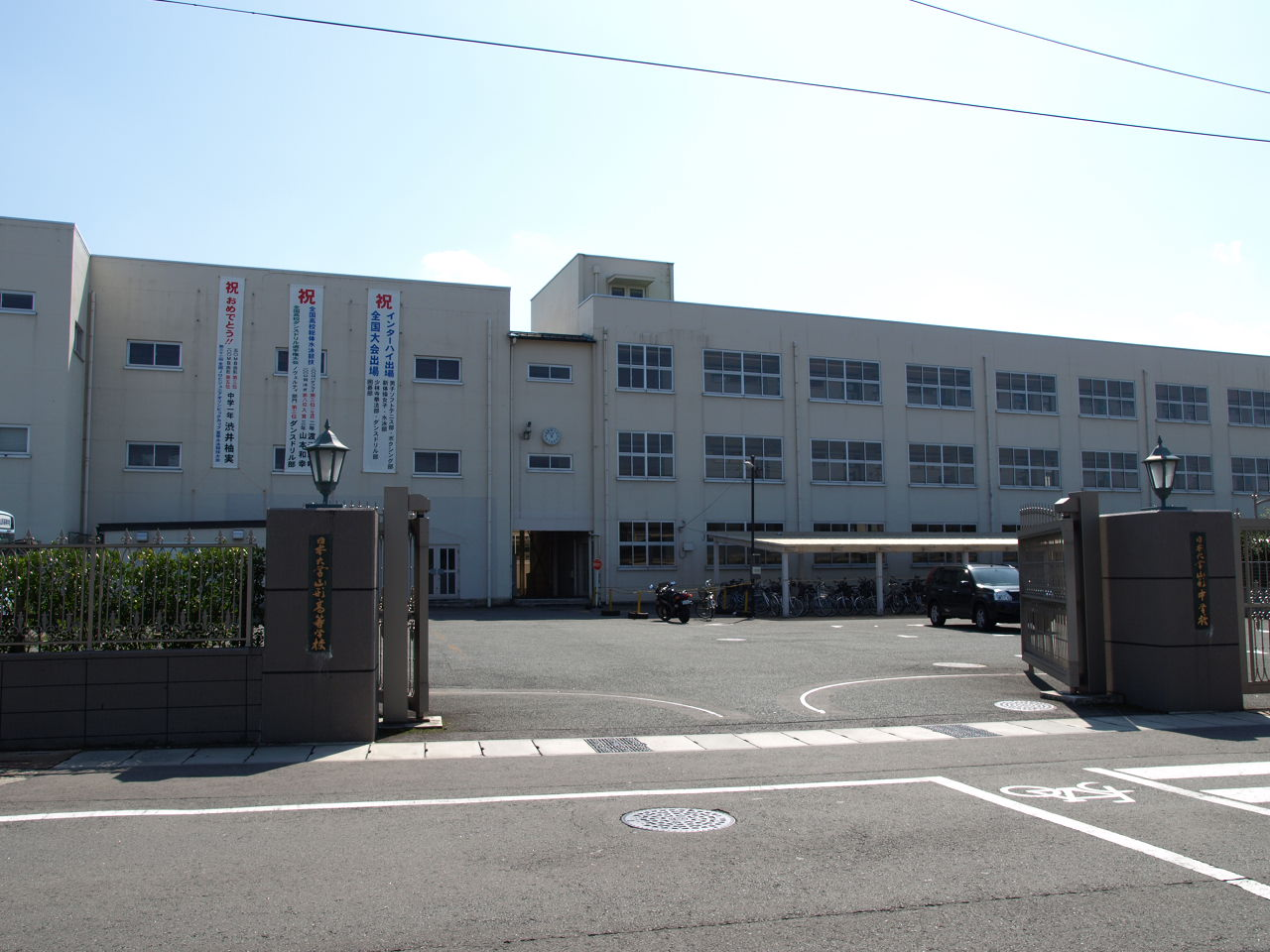

Location
- 4-55 Torii-ga-oka, Yamagata, Yamagata Prefecture; 990-2433; Japan; 38°13′50.5″N 140°20′0.1″E

Information
- Type: Private
- Established: March 8, 1958
- Grades: 10–12
- Gender: Coeducational
- Education system: Full-time
- Campus type: Urban
- Affiliation: Nihon University
- Website: www.ymgt.hs.nihon-u.ac.jp

Nihon University Yamagata Senior High School (in Japanese にほんだいがくやまがたこうとうがっこう) is a private high school located in Torii-ga-oka, Yamagata, Yamagata Prefecture, Japan. It is commonly known as "Nichidai Yamagata" or simply "Nichidai". It is an affiliated school of Nihon University.

This article also covers the Nihon University Yamagata Junior High School, which was co-located with the high school until 2014.

== Overview ==
Founded in 1958 as Yamagata Daiichi High School and incorporated into Nihon University in 1962, the school is known for its General Course with academic and sports tracks. The boys wear black gakuran uniforms and girls wear sailor uniforms. Established in 1960, its school song—written by Kotaro Jimbo and composed by Osamu Shimizu—famously begins with "Boys, be ambitious."

== History ==
Founded in 1958 as Yamagata Daiichi High School by the Yamagata Gakuen corporation, the school became part of Nihon University in 1962. It became coeducational in 1987 and opened an affiliated junior high school in 1989, which closed in 2014. The school gained national attention through its baseball team, which reached the Best 8 at the 2006 Japan National High School Baseball Championship and the Best 4 in 2013—the highest results ever for Yamagata Prefecture.

== Clubs and activities ==
The school has a strong athletic tradition. The masculine basketball team won the national title at the 1982 All-Japan High School Basketball Tournament and returned to the Winter Cup in 2017 after a decade. The boys’ swimming team captured the overall championship at the 2001 Inter-High School Championships. The baseball team reached national prominence with Best 8 and Best 4 finishes at the Japan National High School Baseball Championship in 2006 and 2013 respectively. Other sports such as soccer, volleyball, rugby, and handball have also qualified for national competitions.

The school also maintains active cultural clubs, including brass band, art, theater, calligraphy, broadcasting, and manga circles.

== Location and access ==
The school is located at 4-55 Torii-ga-oka in Yamagata, Yamagata Prefecture. It is approximately a 32-minute walk from Yamagata Station, or accessible by the Yamakō Bus, one minute from the "Nichidai Yamakō-mae" stop. The school also operates a comprehensive athletic ground in the Naka-Sakurada district of the city.

== Notable alumni ==
=== Baseball ===
- Kenta Kurihara
- Nobuyuki Okumura
- Takumu Nakano

=== Sports ===
- Kenji Takahashi
- Katsumi Suzuki
- Takashi Nishida – snowboarder

=== Entertainment and media ===
- Tomo (of Tetsu & Tomo) – comedian

== Nihon University Yamagata Junior High School ==
Nihon University Yamagata Junior High School (にほんだいがくやまがたちゅうがっこう) was a private junior high school co-located with the high school in Torii-ga-oka, Yamagata, Yamagata Prefecture, from 1989 (Heisei 1) to 2014 (Heisei 26). It was the first private junior high school in the prefecture.

Beginning in April 1989, the school offered an integrated secondary education model with the high school, but in its first year applicant numbers fell short of capacity. On April 1, 2012 (Heisei 24) recruitment of new students was suspended, and at the Yamagata Prefecture Private Schools Council meeting on December 26, 2013, it was recommended that the school be closed as of March 31, 2014 (Heisei 26) due to declining birthrates and the inability to secure sufficient entrants.
