= Wild Grass (poetry collection) =

1927 prose poetry collection by Lu Xun

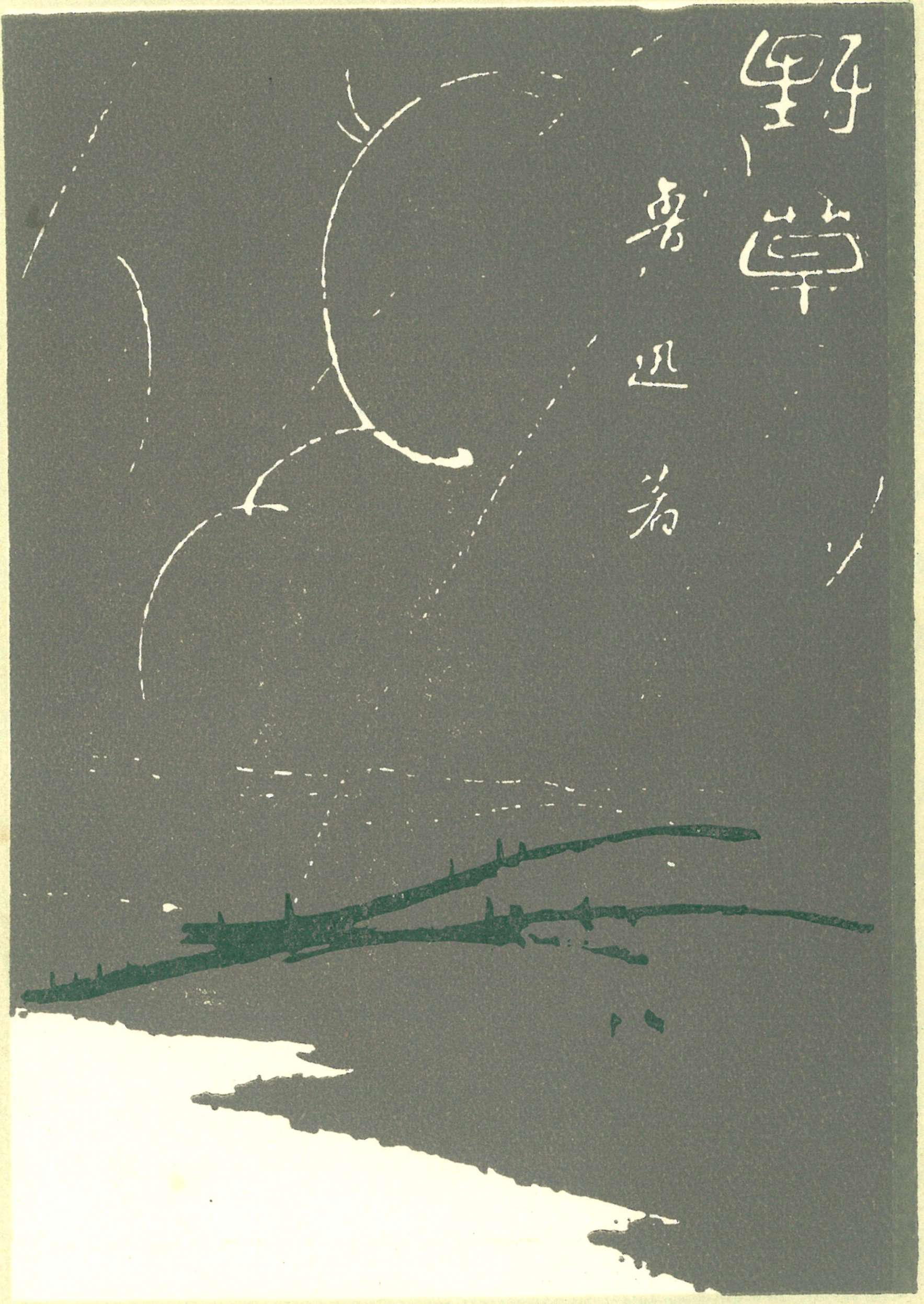
- Cover of the first edition
- Author: Lu Xun
- Language: Chinese
- Genre: Prose poetry
- Publisher: Beixin Press
- Publication date: July 1927
- Publication place: China
- Media type: Print

Wild Grass (Chinese: 野草; pinyin: Yécǎo) is a collection of prose poetry by Lu Xun, published in July 1927. It comprises twenty-four pieces (including the preface), written between 1924 and 1926. Among the best-known are "Autumn Night", "The Kite", "Snow", "The Passer-by", and "The Epitaph". All of them first appeared in serial form in the magazine Yusi (Threads of Language). The collection was composed during Lu Xun's courtship of Xu Guangping, against the backdrop of the Beijing Women's Normal University Incident and the March 18 Massacre; these events left a deep imprint on its content. Wild Grass levels a critique at the darkness of contemporary Chinese reality, while also expressing the author's personal philosophical concerns and recording his emotional life. The pieces fall broadly into two thematic groups: one set comprises the author's self‑analysis of his own darker psychological states—for instance, "The Shadow's Farewell", "The Passer-by", and "The Epitaph"; the other depicts Lu Xun's struggle against conservative forces, as in "Autumn Night", "Revenge", and "In the Faint Light of Bloodstains", In terms of genre, the collection belongs to the category of prose poetry: it is concise, poetic, and occasionally rhymed. The prevailing mood is gloom and darkness, reflecting the poet's depression, grief, and disappointment with the masses. Technically, Wild Grass draws on modernist artistic methods such as symbolism, metaphor, and allegory, creating a rich tapestry of imagery and sometimes touching on the absurdity of surrealism. The work was inspired by Ryūnosuke Akutagawa's My Prose Poems (或る散文詩), as well as by the writings of Kuriyagawa Hakuson, Natsume Sōseki, Mikhail Artsybashev, Charles Baudelaire, and Ivan Turgenev. It is widely regarded as a masterpiece of Lu Xun's individual creative output and is generally acknowledged as one of the great works of modern Chinese literature.

== Background ==
In July 1923, Lu Xun severed relations with his younger brother Zhou Zuoren and moved out of the extended Zhou family residence at Badaowan Hutong in Beijing. At the time he had hoped to separate from his wife, Zhu An, with whom he had no romantic attachment; this proved impossible, however, because she insisted on remaining with him. In May 1924 he moved to a new home on Xisan Tiao Hutong—a traditional siheyuan (courtyard house)—where a small room was built onto the north side of the south‑facing main hall to serve as his study and bedroom. He called this space the "Tiger's Tail" (老虎尾巴). From its window he could see the backyard and two jujube trees; the scenery of this courtyard is described in the first piece of Wild Grass, "Autumn Night." After moving to Xisan Tiao, Lu Xun published a large number of articles; all of the twenty‑three "Wild Grass" pieces were written in the "Tiger's Tail." The years 1924 and 1925, during which he wrote Wild Grass, represent the most prolific period of Lu Xun's life. Between 1924 and 1926, he completed over two hundred writings and translations.

By the end of 1923 his A Brief History of Chinese Fiction was finished, freeing him from the burden of preparing lectures. From October 1923 he began teaching at the Women's Normal College (which became Beijing Women's Normal University the following year), and the enthusiasm of the young female students helped to rekindle "the dying embers of youth and creative desire in the depths of Lu Xun's heart." Wild Grass was written precisely during the period of Lu Xun's acquaintance and romance with Xu Guangping, an event that strongly influenced his writing. Lu Xun and Zhu An had a marriage in name only. Before he began composing Wild Grass he already knew Xu Guangping well, and by the summer of 1925 they had established a romantic relationship. Xu's love rescued Lu Xun from despair, but it also confronted him with a difficult choice between personal affection and moral responsibility. Roughly half of the pieces in Wild Grass were written after Lu Xun and Xu had begun exchanging letters and meeting, and they contain some of his most intimate emotions; it was indeed Xu's love that supplied the inspiration for parts of the collection.

Between September and October 1924, Lu Xun translated Kuriyagawa Hakuson's The Symbol of Anguish (苦悶の象徵) and found it deeply resonant. This work gave him both a method and a theoretical basis for creating Wild Grass, powerfully facilitating its birth. At the time Lu Xun was employed at the Ministry of Education while also teaching at Peking University and several other institutions, lecturing on the history of Chinese fiction and literature. In November 1924 a student movement erupted at Beijing Women's Normal University; the following May six members of the student autonomous association were expelled, and Lu Xun became embroiled in disputes with the university's president, Yang Yinyu, and with the professor Chen Yuan. That summer he found himself deeply involved in the turmoil at the Women's Normal University, engaging in fierce debates with the faction behind the Modern Review. In August he was dismissed from his official post by the Minister of Education, Zhang Shizhao, leaving him isolated and with a sense that justice had vanished; this forms the background for "On Making a Stand" and "After Death." Zhang Shizhao held a high position in the warlord government, and the bullying attitude that Lu Xun observed in him inspired "The Dog's Refutation." After the March 18 Massacre in 1926, when the Beijing government of Duan Qirui ordered troops to fire on peaceful demonstrators, killing forty‑seven and wounding more than a hundred and fifty, Lu Xun wrote the final two pieces of Wild Grass as a political response. Throughout the period of composition his health was poor; he suffered from tuberculosis and made frequent visits to the doctor. Facing illness and aging, the poet's depression surfaces repeatedly in Wild Grass.

== Publication ==
Lu Xun wrote "Autumn Night" on 15 September 1924; it was published in Yusi on 1 December that year, becoming the first piece in the "Wild Grass" series. From "Autumn Night" through to "Awakening" in April 1926, he wrote a total of twenty‑three "Wild Grass" pieces, all published in Yusi. In April 1927 he added the "Preface," compiled the collection, and it was published by Beixin Press in July of that year.

== Contents ==
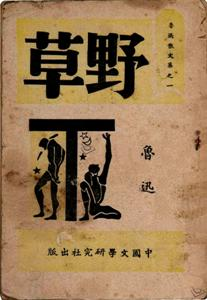
Book cover of Wild Grass

The opening piece, "Autumn Night," describes the jujube trees in the backyard. The silent night is filled with tension; the trees stubbornly challenge the strange, lofty sky and force it to retreat. The protagonist returns indoors and sees insects crashing against the lampshade, feeling deep affection and pity for them; he sees them as metaphors for revolutionary youth and silently mourns them. "The Shadow's Farewell" pictures a shadow that, while the person is fast asleep, wishes to leave, rejecting heaven, hell, and the "golden world"; it knows it will vanish in the light, yet chooses to be swallowed by the darkness. "The Beggar" finds the protagonist walking in wind and dust, encountering two begging children, but feeling no impulse to give; he thinks that if he were to beg he too would adopt a posture of wuwei (non‑action) and silence. The piece describes a world of numbness and estrangement. "My Lost Love" is a parodic doggerel verse that mocks the popular love‑lament poetry of the day by imitating Zhang Heng's "Four Sorrows." The protagonist gives his beloved an owl, candied haws, aspirin, and a "red‑banded snake," and receives only indifference in return.

"Revenge" portrays a man and a woman standing naked in the wilderness, as if about to embrace or to kill. Passers‑by rush to watch, but the couple simply stands motionless; the crowd grows bored and disperses, and the couple feel great joy. The work satirises a society obsessed with spectatorship. "Revenge (Part II)" draws on the Gospel of Mark to recount the crucifixion of Jesus. Jesus refuses the anaesthetic offered to him and stays fully conscious in order to observe how the people of Israel treat the Son of God; this is his revenge on those who crucify him.

"Hope" gives voice to loneliness and the sense of aging, lamenting even the despondency of the young. It quotes the Hungarian poet Sándor Petőfi's "Song of Hope" and his dictum that "despair is as much a sham as hope," expressing a solitary struggle against despair. "Snow" depicts the beautiful snowscapes of Jiangnan, with children building a snow Buddha; the snow of the north is like powder or sand, scattered on houses and the ground, rising and swirling in the wind. "The Kite" recalls how, as a boy, the protagonist despised his younger brother for flying a kite and once angrily destroyed a kite his brother had secretly made. As an adult he feels deep guilt and wishes for forgiveness, but his brother has entirely forgotten the incident, so no forgiveness is possible. "The Good Story" remembers the beautiful rural scenery glimpsed from a boat on Shanyin Road near the author's childhood home. Reflections swayed and divided in the water; red flower‑shadows floated and scattered. Just as the protagonist is absorbed in the scene, he wakes suddenly, overcome by loss and regret.

"The Passer‑by" is a short drama. The passer‑by walks forward without knowing his destination, his feet wounded and bleeding. He meets an old man and a girl; he rejects the old man's advice to turn back, but accepts a piece of cloth from the girl to bandage his wound. The old man tells him that the road ahead leads only to a graveyard, yet he insists on continuing. The passer‑by is an embodiment of the wandering Lu Xun. "Dead Fire" tells of the protagonist's fall into an ice valley, where he discovers frozen "dead fire." Revived by his body heat, the dead fire hopes to leave the ice valley with him even though it knows it will burn out; but the protagonist is crushed by a large stone cart at the valley's mouth.

In "The Dog's Refutation," the tattered protagonist scolds a dog for barking at him, calling it "snobbish." The dog retorts that it is "ashamed to be inferior to humans" because it cannot distinguish between officials and commoners, or masters and slaves, leaving the protagonist too ashamed to face it. The work satirises human snobbery and the slave mentality. "The Lost Good Hell" tells how the devil once defeated the heavenly god and ruled over heaven, earth, and hell. Many years later humanity rises up and overthrows the devil, taking control of hell and renovating it, only to inflict even harsher torments on the ghosts. The piece views Chinese society itself as a kind of hell. "The Epitaph" describes a tombstone whose front is carved with words: "There is a wandering soul, it is a long snake, devouring itself." The tomb is ruined, the corpse exposed, heart and liver gone; the back of the stone reads "Cutting out the heart to eat it, wishing to know its true taste." Finally the corpse sits up inside the tomb. "The Trembling of the Decaying Line" recounts the protagonist's dream of a widow who sells her body to raise her daughter; the daughter, once grown and married, despises her mother along with her husband. The old woman walks naked into the wilderness, her grief unfathomable, her decaying body trembling together with the heavens. The story symbolises the author's repeated experience of being ruthlessly betrayed.

"On Making a Stand" features a teacher who instructs his students in the art of argument by telling a story: praising a newborn child for future wealth and office earns gratitude, while telling the truth—that the child will die—earns a beating. Therefore it is best to keep one's opinions to oneself. "After Death" recounts a dream in which the protagonist dies on the road, unable to move but still conscious, is discovered by passers‑by and placed in a coffin, whereupon a bookseller even comes to sell him ancient books. The work satirises the numbness and coldness of onlookers, using flies to target the hypocrisy of Chen Yuan, who was engaged in polemics with the author at the time.

"Such a Warrior" was written in response to intellectuals who had sided with the warlords. The warrior is a projection of Lu Xun himself, spear in hand, entering the enemy camp alone, hurling his spear into the enemy's chest; the enemy slips away, but the warrior remains indomitable. "The Wise Man, the Fool and the Slave" shows a slave complaining to both a wise man and a fool. The wise man offers sympathy; the fool, however, insists on smashing a hole in the wall to make a window for the slave, and is chased away by a crowd of slaves. The piece satirises the willingness of so many Chinese to remain content in servitude. "The Dried Leaf" recalls how Lu Xun plucked a red, diseased leaf from a maple tree and pressed it in a book; a year later the leaf had turned wax‑yellow and lost its colour, prompting him to reflect on his own illness. "In the Faint Light of Bloodstains" was written in protest against the March 18 Massacre of 1926, when Duan Qirui's government opened fire on civilians. It accuses the Creator of making people forget their pain and letting the blood fade, while praising the "fierce warrior" who continues to resist stubbornly, compelling heaven and earth to take on a new aspect. "Awakening" opens with planes from the Fengtian clique dropping bombs over Beijing; the author sits in his study editing the manuscripts of young writers, appreciating their distress and anger, and recalling the magazines Shallow Grass and Sunken Bell that they ran, which fills him with joy and gratitude and makes him feel that he is "living among men." The "Preface" was written shortly after the April 12 Coup, under conditions of terror that forced him into silence, and it comments on the collection: "Its roots are not deep, its flowers and leaves are not beautiful." It grew with difficulty in barren soil, but it is what the author loves; he dedicates Wild Grass to all his friends and enemies, "before those who love and those who do not."

== Themes ==
Wild Grass is in essence a story of Lu Xun's resistance against "darkness and nothingness." The dominant key is one of defiance and the shattering of darkness, even though the collection also reveals inner nihilism, loneliness, and dejection. The pieces divide into two main categories: those in which the author analyses the dark side of his own thinking—for example, "The Shadow's Farewell," "The Passer‑by," and "The Epitaph"—and those that portray his struggle against conservative forces, such as "Autumn Night," "Revenge," and "In the Faint Light of Bloodstains." One major theme is social and political criticism of a dark reality: Lu Xun attacks the tyranny of warlord politics and the spiritual ignorance of the masses, comparing their condition to the night sky ("Autumn Night"), hell ("The Lost Good Hell"), and the desert ("Awakening"). He criticises the common people, expressing disappointment that they show no signs of awakening (the two "Revenge" pieces). "After Death" uses ants and flies to metaphorically capture the pettiness of the mediocre. The collection as a whole conveys a sense of resignation and hopelessness, and occasionally the poet even feels that if the ignorant masses cannot be saved, they deserve annihilation ("In the Faint Light of Bloodstains").

Wild Grass also stands as a genuine record of the poet's emotional experiences and philosophical reflections during the mid‑1920s; the whole sequence can be read as a spiritual journey, offering a "dissected" view of Lu Xun's inner world. It focuses on subjective feeling rather than on painting an objective picture of reality; pain, resentment, and longing are all fused into these texts. "The Shadow's Farewell" expresses the poet's subconscious wish to separate from his wife. "Revenge" reflects the confrontation between husband and wife, a permanent stand‑off that continues until they wither. "Hope" voices the author's longing for love or for a life with meaning. "The Passer‑by" reveals a desire for his wife's death and the guilt that follows, a contradictory tangle of love and hatred. "Dead Fire" uses the image of dead fire as a metaphor for Xu Guangping; obtaining it is the protagonist's long‑cherished wish, and the poem betrays Lu Xun's triumphant state of mind on first receiving love. Several pieces in Wild Grass are marked by a strong sense of repentance. The corpse in "The Epitaph" can be understood as a moral death, a metaphor for Lu Xun's self‑condemnation and his guilt toward his wife, Zhu An. The description of "cutting out the heart to eat it" symbolises a thorough and ruthless dissection of the self, with psychological implications that are "excruciatingly painful."

Another theme is philosophical reflection on the self, on life, and on the individual will. Lu Xun captures the conflict between "unsatisfactory existence and suppressed vitality," displaying what has been called "rebellious individualism," together with a radical doubt of the self and of reason. The protagonist is often placed in an inescapable predicament and falls into despair. Faced with existential deadlock, Wild Grass expresses a summons to the will to live. "The Shadow's Farewell" challenges the validity of reason, rejecting not only the religious versions of heaven and hell but also the political hope for a future golden world. The same kind of confusion and doubt appears in "Hope" and "The Passer‑by." "The Beggar" depicts a state of extreme alienation and mutual suspicion between people; the protagonist refuses to give alms out of emotional disgust, yet fears begging out of rational wariness. This dilemma between emotion and reason is one of the central philosophical issues in the book. The passer‑by in "The Passer‑by"—sorrowful, alone, endlessly pressing forward—best embodies the world of Wild Grass. The work offers an "existentialist emphasis on the meaning of human will," in which the act of walking itself becomes the sole significance of existence. The old man, the passer‑by, and the girl respectively represent nihilistic, existentialist, and idealistic attitudes toward life. "The Dog's Refutation" reflects Lu Xun's thinking about human nature, suggesting that it is worse than that of a dog, and using the dog to indirectly attack his polemical opponents. "On Making a Stand" reveals the author's disappointment that reason cannot function in everyday life; it is utterly powerless against absurdity and lies.

== Genre and style ==
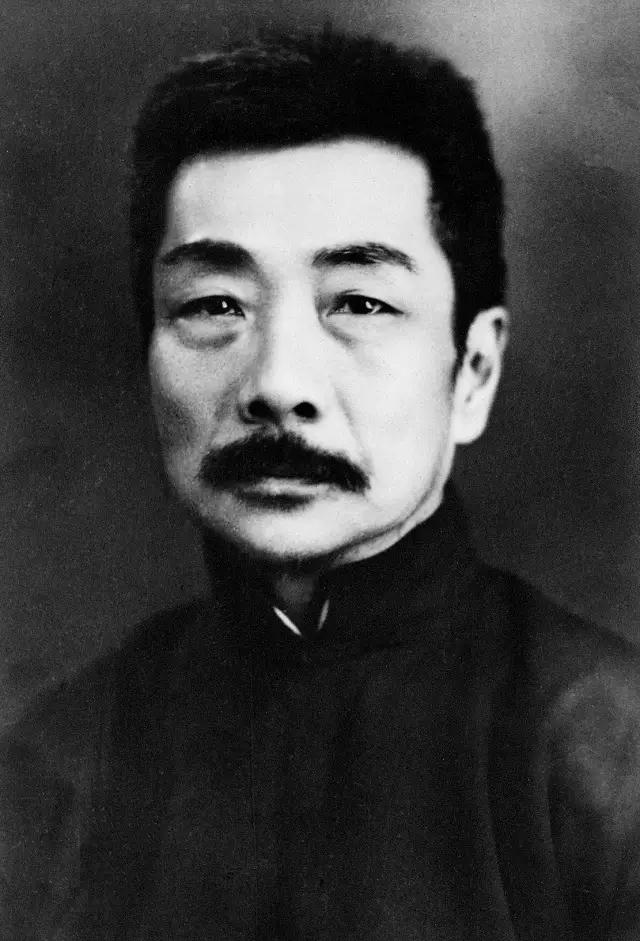
Lu Xun, author of Wild Grass

Lu Xun himself referred to the pieces in Wild Grass as prose poems, a "fusion of poetry and philosophy" that creates a series of poetic images. Each piece is short yet rich in meaning, building a mysterious and modern poetic world. "Autumn Night" is full of poetic imagination; the ending of "Snow" imbues its description of natural scenes with fantasy and metaphorical imagery that turn the prose into poetry. Wild Grass also represents Lu Xun's pursuit of the aesthetic and musical possibilities of vernacular Chinese. "The Shadow's Farewell" and "Dead Fire" have fairly regular rhymes; if they were set in lines they would read like free verse. The two "Revenge" pieces are tightly structured, with a measured rhythm and resonant diction, and a repeated theme. The "Preface" is forceful and sonorous, full of passion. "The Good Story" contains many rhymed sentences and uses parallelism, which gives it a musical quality; each scene passes like a brief note that comes and goes quickly, yet leaves an echo. "My Lost Love" is the only poem in Wild Grass written in separate lines. "The Passer‑by" is the only piece in dramatic form; its dialogue is full of symbolic meaning and can be described as prose‑poetry in dramatic guise. "After Death" approaches the short story, while "The Lost Good Hell" reads like a fable with a complete plot and mythological material. "On Making a Stand" and "The Wise Man, the Fool and the Slave" are satirical fables: the former attacks the philosophy of trimming one's sails to the wind, the latter satirises the stupidity of the masses. "The Kite" is stylistically close to the lyrical reminiscences in Dawn Blossoms Plucked at Dusk.

The overall style of Wild Grass is gloomy and dark, the dominant tone sombre and even cruel, reflecting the poet's dejection and grief as well as his disappointment with the masses, and concealing a deep sense of loneliness, doubt, and decadence. The writing is extremely concise, honest, and vivid, laying bare Lu Xun's inner world; the world of Wild Grass has been called "the poet's nightmare‑like garden of wild fantasy." The prose poems are nightmarish, full of modernist features, presenting images of terror and anxiety that are rarely seen in traditional Chinese poetry. "The Epitaph" is especially sinister, making one's hair stand on end. The collection is emotionally intense, the atmosphere empty and bitter, the mood desolate, hovering between hope and despair. Some pieces are depressed and pessimistic, yet they also possess a strong spirit of struggle; their protagonists resist fate without compromise. The meaning of Wild Grass is often obscure, profound and intricate; the most difficult to interpret are "The Shadow's Farewell" and "The Epitaph," while "The Epitaph," the two "Revenge" pieces, and the "Preface" are all highly compressed in language. "My Lost Love," "The Dog's Refutation," and "On Making a Stand" are relatively accessible, written in a comical, satirical vein. "On Making a Stand" has a touch of banter and approaches black comedy. There are also gentler pieces that express compassion and kindness, such as "The Dried Leaf." The most lyrical pieces of the book are generally associated with memories of home, youth, and the past—"The Kite," "Snow," and "The Good Story."

== Techniques ==
Wild Grass employs modernist artistic techniques: symbolism, metaphor, and allegory. The author shifts constantly between the real and the void, waking and dreaming, consciousness and the subconscious, giving the works a profoundly "modern" quality. The image in "Revenge" of a couple who neither embrace nor kill one another is done in a symbolist mode. The suggestive techniques of symbolist poetry appear in "The Shadow's Farewell," "The Lost Good Hell," "The Epitaph," "After Death," the two "Revenge" pieces, "The Passer‑by," and "Such a Warrior." "The Passer‑by" is heavily symbolic: the dusk setting, the ages of the characters, the east‑to‑west journey, the uncertain destination, and the dialogue all convey symbolic meaning, and they symbolically express the author's confusion about which road to take. "The Lost Good Hell" uses hell to stand for Chinese society, where power changed hands several times but was always in the grip of warlords. The theme of "The Trembling of the Decaying Line" is self‑sacrifice and ingratitude, symbolising Lu Xun's experience with the younger generation. The collection also absorbs modern narrative techniques such as characterisation, dialogue, and shifting perspectives; "Dead Fire" takes the form of a dialogue between the poet and the dead fire. The modernist dimension of Wild Grass is apparent in its nightmares and the surrealist absurdity that runs through it.

Wild Grass constructs a surreal world that interweaves reality and fantasy, life and death, humans and ghosts, humans and beasts. The images are bizarre and startling: dead fire, devils, dead men still conscious, resurrected corpses—all with the nightmarish quality of incoherence and inverted reality. Many pieces are dream‑based; seven begin with "I dreamed." The collection also uses images of beggars, prostitutes, shadows, and corpses to deform or exaggerate its characters, giving them an expressionist quality. The surrealist description in "The Passer‑by" is evident in how the passer‑by always hears a voice ahead urging him forward. "Dead Fire" shows a surreal world through a dream vision; the frozen dead fire in the ice valley is one of the most striking images in the book. "After Death" mixes surreality with humour, adopting a comic tone and yet remaining vividly realistic. "The Trembling of the Decaying Line" expands the trembling of a single body to encompass the whole universe—another surrealist device. In terms of language, a few pieces such as "The Lost Good Hell" and "The Epitaph" borrow words from classical literary or Buddhist scriptures, which creates a distancing effect. "The Epitaph" blends classical Chinese with modern vernacular to underscore the dreamlike hallucination. "The Lost Good Hell" contains Buddhist terms such as "boiling oil," "sword trees," "knife mountains," "cow‑headed demons," and mandala. Lu Xun also coined his own expressions, for instance "wudi" (無地, lit. "no earth/ground"), "wuzhi zhi zhen" (無物之陣, lit. "array of nothingness"), and "yun dian" (殞顛, lit. "fall/perish").

The imagination at work in Wild Grass is sweeping, and it uses a wealth of colourful images to project the author's inner conflicts and anguish, giving vivid shape to Lu Xun's psychological dilemmas and powerfully highlighting the complexity of his themes. The series that begins with "I dreamed" is full of marvellous images, leaving an overall impression of haze. The shadow is a key image, symbolising the emptiness and hopelessness that Lu Xun felt, neither fully bright nor fully dark. "Such a Warrior" visualises both the darkness of society and Lu Xun's own unending struggle, encapsulating his unique spirit of defiance. The shadow in "The Shadow's Farewell" stands for another self of the poet; the passer‑by in "The Passer‑by" is a self‑portrait; both are metaphors for the self. A sharp contrast often appears between the small, humble physical form of a character and the courage and tenacity of its spirit; the small green insects in "Autumn Night" embody Lu Xun's determination to "attempt the impossible." Some pieces have strikingly vivid imagery. "The Good Story" is beautifully written and expresses the author's beautiful dream and the hope he finds in it; the juxtaposed nouns—"the elms on both banks, new rice, wildflowers, chickens, dogs, thickets and dead trees, thatched cottages, pagodas, monasteries, farmers and village women, clothes drying in the sun, monks, bamboo hats and rain capes, sky, clouds, bamboo"—offer a rich collage of images. Wild Grass makes effective use of personification; "Autumn Night" personifies the jujube trees, night sky, moon, stars, wildflowers, and fallen leaves, giving the jujube trees an independent personality, while the "evil bird" is given the meaning of resistance and rebellion. "Snow" uses personification to bring the "northern snow" closer to the image of a rebel.

== Artistic origins ==
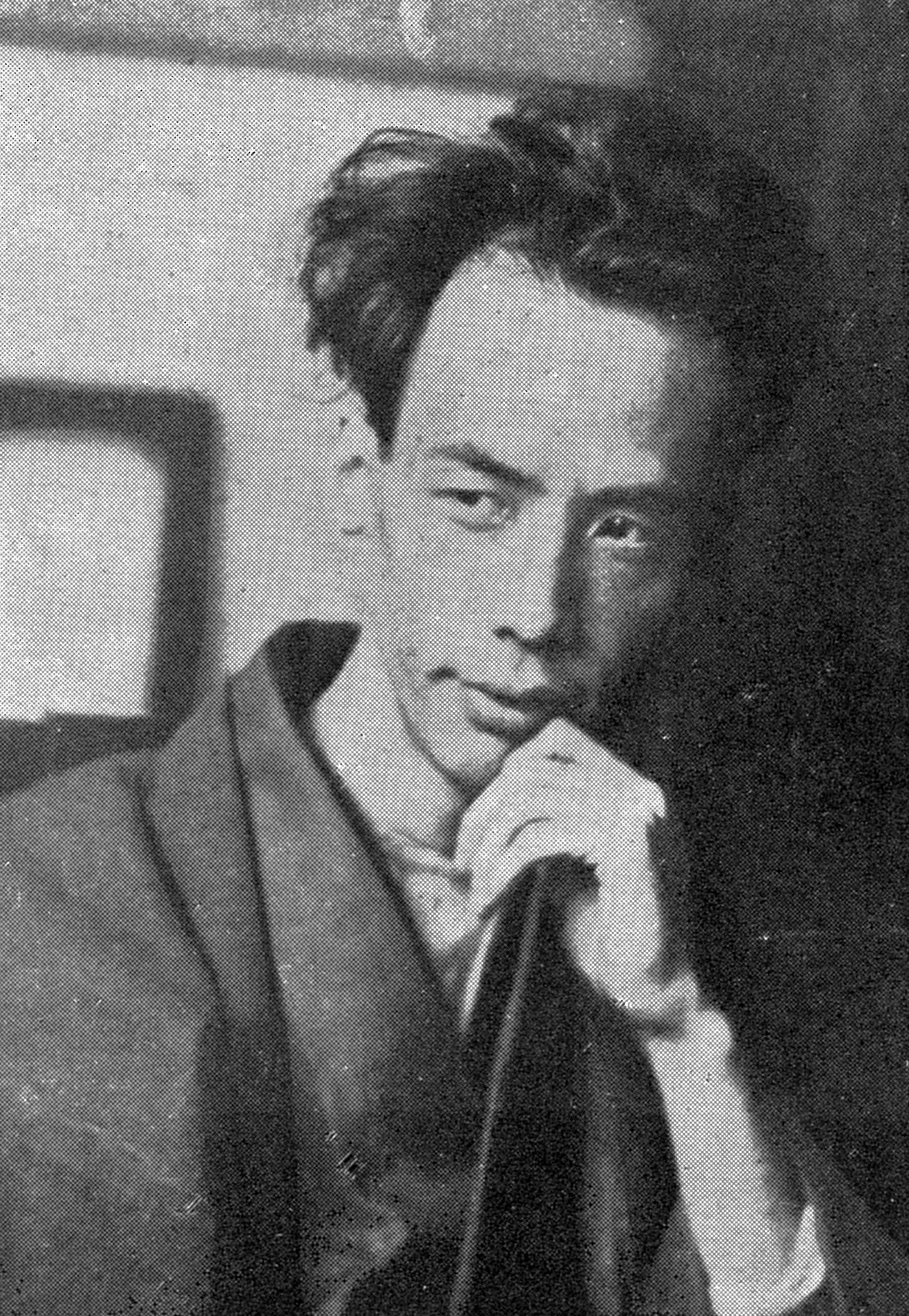
Ryūnosuke Akutagawa, who influenced the creation of Wild Grass

Wild Grass was shaped by foreign thought and literary forms. It is likely that Lu Xun became acquainted with the European genre of prose poetry through Japanese translations or imitations. His choice of the prose‑poem form was inspired by Ryūnosuke Akutagawa's book My Prose Poems (或る散文詩). The material of "Autumn Night" resembles Akutagawa's prose poem "The Sawtooth Oak" (櫧樹); in both, the trees are rendered with the posture of a standing soldier. "The Passer‑by" draws on Akutagawa's short play "The Rebirth Scroll" (往生畫巻): the passer‑by and the old man correspond respectively to the "five nobles entering the way" and the aged monk. Natsume Sōseki's prose‑poetry collection Ten Nights of Dreams contains ten pieces set up as dreams; Wild Grass similarly has seven pieces that claim to be dreams, and their form and content are close to Sōseki's work. Fujita Rina believes that "The Passer‑by" shares similarities with Sōseki's "Seventh Night." The embrace and killing in the first half of "Revenge" were influenced by Jōzan Hasegawa's essay "The Strange Theory of Blood," though Lu Xun's treatment is more detailed.

Lu Xun embraced the literary views set out in Kuriyagawa Hakuson's The Symbol of Anguish, regarding all literature as the symbolic expression of the inner world, and the creation of Wild Grass drew on both the method and the theory offered by that book. The desolate, dark, impoverished, and often absurd settings of these prose poems, the tattered clothing and frail bodies of the protagonists, their confused and hesitant mentality, their ultimately futile attempts to break free, the suppressed and tragic atmosphere, and the bizarre or horrific imagery all accord well with Kuriyagawa's theories. Kuriyagawa advocated a "symbolist method of expression," and following his lead Lu Xun wrote in a symbolist vein, turning the "almost blindly advancing vitality" that Kuriyagawa described into the protagonist of "The Passer‑by." Kuriyagawa urged writers to "dig deeper, deeper into their own inner world, until they reach the anguish at its very bottom," a principle that guided the composition of pieces such as "The Shadow's Farewell" and "The Trembling of the Decaying Line," both of which bring out unconscious contents. Kuriyagawa also held that artworks express the "latent content of dreams," which encouraged the inclusion of no fewer than nine dream‑based pieces in Wild Grass. Furthermore, the image of the fool in "The Wise Man, the Fool and the Slave" is built on the figure of the "fool" in Kuriyagawa's Out of the Ivory Tower.

Wild Grass also inherits the "vastness" of Nietzsche's Superman and his unique style. Its affinity with Nietzsche's Thus Spoke Zarathustra lies in its presentation of the contradictory struggle between hope and despair, as well as the psychological process of self‑overcoming. Both books employ soliloquy, symbolic imagery, and cryptic aphorisms. The characterisation of the passer‑by in "The Passer‑by" and the warrior in "Such a Warrior" is indebted to Thus Spoke Zarathustra; what Wild Grass reaches for is Nietzsche's "Superman." The long snake in "The Epitaph" resembles the snake in Zarathustra's nightmare. The jujube tree that stands for Lu Xun in "Autumn Night" is similar to the tree that symbolises the Superman in Nietzsche's The Gay Science. There is a "shadow" in Thus Spoke Zarathustra that may have provided the inspiration or prototype for the shadow in "The Shadow's Farewell." Zarathustra bids farewell to his shadow in order to continue wandering toward the light, while the shadow in Wild Grass wishes to part from humanity and disappear into the dark. The plot of "The Passer‑by" derives from the sections "The Wanderer" and "The Urgent Call" in Thus Spoke Zarathustra; the passer‑by, like Zarathustra, is searching for a way out. The passer‑by rejects sympathy, displaying the traits of the Nietzschean solitary warrior. The dialogue structure may come from Zarathustra: the relationship between the passer‑by and the old man parallels that between Zarathustra and the prophet, while the relationship between the passer‑by and the little girl mirrors that between Zarathustra and the hermit. "Hope" bears traces of the chapter "The Apostate" in Thus Spoke Zarathustra.

Other writers who influenced Wild Grass include Petőfi, Artsybashev, Charles Baudelaire, and Turgenev. The long snake in "The Epitaph" that "devours itself and finally perishes" borrows from the self‑destructive figure of Manfred in Lord Byron's poetic drama Manfred. The title "The Trembling of the Decaying Line" comes from a passage in Artsybashev's The Worker Shevyrev where the protagonist sees a vision of Jesus. Sun Yushi notes that Baudelaire and Turgenev's prose poetry also left their mark on Wild Grass. Baudelaire's Petits Poèmes en prose was quoted in Kuriyagawa's book, and this may have drawn Lu Xun's attention. Wild Grass resembles the Petits Poèmes in both emotion and language. "The Dog's Refutation" was influenced by "The Dog and the Perfume Bottle" in Baudelaire's text; "Autumn Night" has affinities with "The Artist's Confession." The imagery of "The Epitaph" recalls Baudelaire's poem "Une Charogne." The technique and meaning of "The Dried Leaf" are very close to Baudelaire's "The Spectre—IV. The Portrait." "After Death" responds to a Baudelaire prose poem about a corpse seen by the roadside. Nick Admussen describes Wild Grass as Baudelairean prose poetry; Jaroslav Průšek also compared it to Baudelaire's prose. Finally, the image of tearing open the chest to take out the heart in "The Epitaph," and the sudden surging of waves in the air in "The Trembling of the Decaying Line," show the influence of Leonid Andreyev.

== Translations ==
In 1931, Wild Grass was translated into English by Feng Yusheng (馮餘聲), but the manuscript was destroyed during the January 28 Shanghai War. There exist multiple Japanese translations: those by Kaji Wataru (1937), Takeuchi Yoshimi (1953), Takahashi Kazumi (1967), Komada Shinji (1978), Shōhei Iikura (1985), Tomoyuki Katayama (1991), and Tsuneyoshi Maruo (1997). In 1971, the Soviet Union issued a Russian translation. The Foreign Languages Press in China published versions in English (1974), German (1978), Korean (1972), and Esperanto (1974). Translations were also published abroad in Czech (1951), French (1975), and Danish (1976). In 2022, Harvard University Press published an English translation of Wild Grass together with Dawn Blossoms Plucked at Dusk, entitled Wild Grass and Morning Blossoms Gathered at Dusk, translated by Eileen J. Cheng.

== Critical reception ==
Wild Grass is widely considered a great work. Lu Xun himself remarked that "the technique is not bad, but the mood is too decadent." In 1929 the Communist Youth League of China magazine Leninist Youth criticised the pessimism and defeatism of Wild Grass, arguing that it could not inspire revolutionary fervour; Cheng Fangwu, Guo Moruo, and Feng Naichao also condemned its nihilism. Feng Xuefeng believed that Wild Grass was "not that important" within Lu Xun's oeuvre, describing it as "nihilistic, pessimistic and despairing," full of individualistic contradictions. Sun Yushi criticised the two "Revenge" pieces for "expressing too much lonely sentiment and a tendency to lack comprehensive analysis of the numbness of the masses." Qian Liqun regards Wild Grass as Lu Xun's "most personalized, most original" work, the key to understanding his soul. Takeuchi Yoshimi believed that artistically, Wild Grass is Lu Xun's finest achievement. Tomoyuki Katayama calls it "the quintessence and crystallization of Lu Xun's literature." Kanehide Onoe sees it as the epitome and prototype of all Lu Xun's writing, adding that "he who knows Wild Grass knows Lu Xun." Jaroslav Průšek considered Wild Grass Lu Xun's greatest artistic achievement, comparable to European poetry. Lin Yusheng regards it as the most important material for exploring Lu Xun's subconscious. Li Tianming calls it a masterpiece of Lu Xun's individual creation and a classic in the treasury of modern literary art.
