= Ikuma Dan =

Japanese composer, essayist (1924–2001)

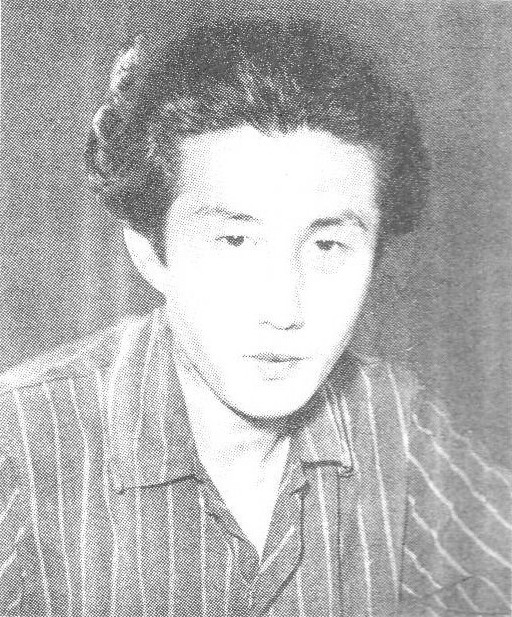
- Born: 7 April 1924; Tokyo, Japan
- Died: 17 May 2001 (aged 77); Jiangsu, China
- Resting place: Japan
- Other name: 團 伊玖磨
- Occupation: composer
- Relatives: Takuma Dan (Grandfather), Ino Dan (Also known as Inou Dan; father), Katsuma Dan (uncle)

Ikuma Dan (團 伊玖磨, Dan Ikuma; 7 April 1924 – 17 May 2001) was a Japanese composer. Dan was born in Tokyo, the descendant of a prominent family, his grandfather Baron Dan Takuma having been President of Mitsui before being assassinated in 1932. He graduated from Aoyama Gakuin and Tokyo Music School in 1946. He studied with teachers including Kosaku Yamada, Kunihiko Hashimoto, Kan'ichi Shimofusa, Saburō Moroi, and Midori Hosokawa.

During his career he completed six symphonies, all recorded and released on the Decca label in Japan, and wrote seven operas as well as a number of filmscores, and many songs. He wrote celebratory music for the Japanese imperial family, actively promoted cultural exchange with China (from 1979 until his death in Suzhou, China, in 2001), and received the commission to write an opera (Takeru) for the 1997 opening of the New National Theatre, Tokyo, Japan's main opera house.

Dan is known in Japan for his 1951 opera Yūzuru (Twilight Crane), which is regularly revived there.

== Honors ==
- 19th Yomiuri Prize, 1968
- Japan Foundation Award, 1998

== Works ==
=== Stage ===
- Yūzuru (Twilight Crane), opera in 1 act, text by Junji Kinoshita, (Osaka, 1952)
- Kikimimizukin (The Listening Cap), opera in 3 acts, text by Junji Kinoshita (Osaka, 1955)
- Yōkihi (Yang Guifei), opera in 3 acts, text by Jirō Osaragi (Tokyo, 1958)
- Futari Shizuka, dance drama (1961)
- Hikarigoke (Luminous Moss), opera in 2 acts, text by Taijun Takeda (Osaka, 1972)
- Chanchiki, opera in 2 acts, text by Yoko Mizuki (Tokyo, 1975)
- Master Flute Player, ballet (1989)
- Susanō, opera, text by Ikuma Dan (1994)
- Takeru, opera, text by Ikuma Dan and Kenya Oda (Tokyo, 1997)

=== Symphonies ===
- Symphony No. 1 in A (1948-49/56-57)
- Symphony à la Burlesque (1954)
- Symphony No. 2 in B♭ (1955-56/88)
- Symphony No. 3 (1960)
- Symphony No. 4 "1965 Kanagawa" (1965)
- Symphony No. 5 "Suruga" (1965)
- Sinfonietta (1974)
- Symphony No. 6 "Hiroshima" for soprano, nohkan, shinobue and orchestra, text by Edmund Blunden (1985)
- Symphony No. 7 "Jashūmon (Heretics)", text by Hakushū Kitahara - unfinished

=== Orchestral ===
- Dance Suite (1948)
- Symphonic Poem "Peace Coming" (1948)
- Orchestral Suite "The Silk Road" (1955)
- Symphonic Suite "Journey through Arabia" (1958)
- Symphonic Reportage "Arab" (1958)
- Grand March "Celebration" for wind orchestra (1959)
- Overture "Tokyo Olympic" (1963)
- Festival Overture (1965)
- Concerto Grosso (1965)
- Letters from Japan No. 1 (1967)
- Letters from Japan No. 2 (1968)
- Letters from Japan No. 3 (1974)
- Symphonic Poem "Nagasaki" for mixed chorus and orchestra (1974)
- Fantasia No. 1 for violin and orchestra (1974)
- Symphonic Poem "Imari" for mixed chorus and orchestra (1979)
- "Night" for orchestra (1982)
- Fantasia No. 2 for violin and orchestra (1983)
- Symphonic Fantasy "The Great Wall of China" (1984)
- Fantasia all'antica for two violins and string orchestra (1988)
- Nocturne Et Dance for flute and orchestra (1990)
- Orchestral Fantasy "Flying Devi" (1991)
- Grand March "The Royal Wedding" for wind orchestra (1992)

=== Chamber and instrumental ===
- Three Intermezzi for piano (1937–38)
- String Trio in A minor (1947)
- Piano Sonata in C (1947)
- String Quartet in B (1948)
- Divertimento for piano 4 hands (1949)
- String Quartet in C (1953)
- Fantasia No. 1 for violin and piano (1973)
- "Night" for 12 cellos (1981)
- 3 Novelettes for piano (1983)
- Fantasia No. 2 for violin and piano (1983)
- Fantasia No. 3 for violin and piano (1984)
- Sonata for flute and piano (1986)
- Sonata for 4 bassoons (1988)
- Sonata for violin and piano (1990)
- "Hagoromo" for flute and harp (1992)
- Sonata for solo cello (1998)
- Sonata for bassoon quartet (1988)
- Sonata for solo violin No. 1 (1998)
- Sonata for solo violin No. 2 (1999)
- "Three Letters" for trombone and harp (1999)
- "Black and Yellow" for solo violin and string quartet (2001)

=== Vocal ===
- Six Songs for Children (六つの子供のうた, Muttsu no kodomo no uta), text by Hakushū Kitahara (1945)
- Five Fragments, text by Hakushū Kitahara (1945)
- Four Songs by Sakutaro Hagiwara (1948)
- To the People of Mino, text by Hakushū Kitahara (1950)
- Three Flowers Songs (1955)
- Three ko-uta, text by Hakushū Kitahara (1958)
- Huit morceaux de Cocteau (1962)
- Chansons Malaises, text by Yvan Goll (2000)

Popular songs

- "Flowery Town" (花の街), text by Shōko Ema (1947)

Children's songs

- "Otsukai ari-san" (おつかいありさん), text by Ei-ichi Sekine
- "Zō-san (The Elephant)" (ぞうさん), text by Michio Mado (1952)
- "Yagi-san yūbin" (やぎさんゆうびん), text by Michio Mado
- "Katatsumuri" (カタツムリ)

=== Choral works ===
- Suite "The Chikugo River" for mixed chorus and piano/orchestra (1968)
- "Ode to Saikai" for mixed chorus and orchestra (1969)

=== Film scores ===
- Dedication of the Great Buddha (1952)
- Sword for Hire (1952)
- An Inlet of Muddy Water (1953)
- Samurai I: Musashi Miyamoto (1954)
- Samurai II: Duel at Ichijoji Temple (1955)
- Samurai III: Duel at Ganryu Island (1956)
- Rickshaw Man (aka "The Life of Wild Matsu") (1958)
- Submarine I-57 Will Not Surrender (1959)
- Storm Over the Pacific (1960)
- The Twilight Story (1960)
- The Last War (1961)
- The Retreat from Kiska^{ja} (1965)
- Sayonara Jupiter (1984)

=== Music for the radio ===
- The Second Radio taiso (1952)
