= Yoshimi Takeuchi =

Japanese academic (1910–1977)

- 竹内 好
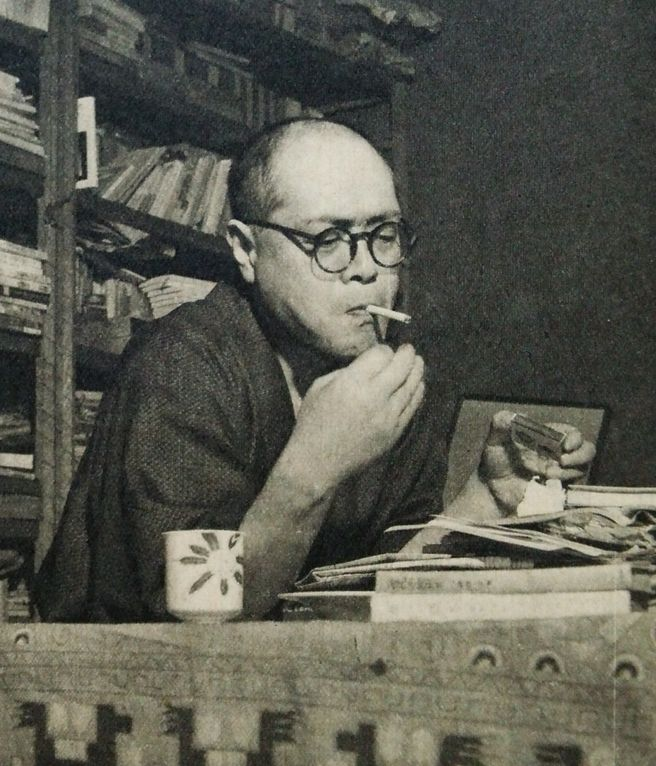
- Born: October 2, 1910; Saku, Nagano, Japan
- Died: March 3, 1977 (aged 66); Tokyo, Japan
- Occupation: Sinologist

Yoshimi Takeuchi (竹内 好, Takeuchi Yoshimi; born October 1910 — 3 March 1977) was a Japanese Sinologist.

== Biography ==
Yoshimi Takeuchi was a Sinologist, a cultural critic and translator. He studied Chinese author Lu Xun and translated Lu's works into Japanese. His book-length study, Lu Xun (1944) ignited a significant reaction in the world of Japanese thought during and after the Pacific War. Takeuchi formed a highly successful Chinese literature study group with Taijun Takeda in 1934 and this is regarded as the beginning of modern Sinology in Japan. He was a professor at Tokyo Metropolitan University from 1953 to 1960 when he resigned in protest. He was known as a distinguished critic of Sino-Japanese issues and his complete works (vols. 17) were published by Chikuma Shobo during 1980–82.

In 1931, Takeuchi graduated from high school and entered the faculty of letters at Tokyo Imperial University, where he met his lifelong friend, Taijun Takeda. Together they formed the Chinese Literature Research Society (Chugoku Bungaku Kenkyukai) and in 1935, they published an official organ for the group, Chugoku Bungaku Geppo in order to open up the study of contemporary Chinese literature as opposed to the "old-style" Japanese Sinology. During 1937 to 1939 he studied abroad in Beijing where he became depressed due to the geo-political situation and drank heavily. In 1940, he changed the title of the official organ from Chugoku Bungaku Geppo to Chugoku Bungaku in which he published a controversial article, "The Greater East Asia War and our resolve" in January 1942. In January 1943, he broke up the Chinese Literature Research Society and decided to discontinue the publication of Chugoku Bungaku despite the group becoming quite successful. In December, he was called up for the Chinese front and stayed there until 1946. This encounter with what he saw as the real living China and Chinese people, as opposed to the abstract China of his studies, made a deep impression on him. He threw himself into a study of the modern colloquial language and during this time, his maiden work was published, the book-length study Lu Xun (1944).

After repatriation, his essays On leader consciousness and What is modernity? became the focus of public attention in 1948 during the Japanese occupation. It is from such essays that his status as an important postwar critic was gradually acknowledged. After 1949, he was greatly moved by the foundation of the People's Republic of China (PRC) and he continued to refer to the PRC in his articles and books. In 1953, he became a full professor at Tokyo Metropolitan University, a post he eventually resigned from in protest after Prime Minister Kishi Nobusuke rammed the revised U.S.-Japan Security Treaty through the National Diet with only members of his own party present in May 1960 despite the massive Anpo Protests expressing popular opposition to the new treaty. During the anti-treaty struggle, Takeuchi played a leading role as one of the foremost intellectuals in postwar Japan under the slogan he coined: "democracy or dictatorship?" From 1963, he argued in favor of Mao Zedong and the Chinese Cultural Revolution in his magazine Chugoku published by Chugoku no Kai until the diplomatic normalization between Japan and the PRC (1972). He was particularly interested in Mao's "Philosophy of base/ground" (konkyochi tetsugaku) which involves the principle of making one's enemy one's own. For Takeuchi, this was similar to Lu Xun's notion of cheng-cha, or endurance/resistance. In his later years, Takeuchi devoted himself to doing a new translation of Lu Xun's works.

== Japan as a humiliation ==
=== Shina and Chugoku ===
Takeuchi felt guilty about the Second Sino-Japanese War in 1937. At that time, Tokyo called China as not "Shina" but "Chugoku" for directing friendship between Japan and the Wang Jingwei regime. In Japanese, "Shina" is a discriminatory word for China. Takeuchi attempted to culturally resist such a manner in a period of a total war.

However, as he knew the Greater East Asia War was also to some extent intended and characterized as a war to liberate East and Southeast Asian nations, Takeuchi pathetically declared his resolve (1942) for what he saw as a war of justice, which is generally interpreted as his cooperation with the war effort. After defeat in 1945, however, he knew that the declared aims of the war were deceptive and he tried to explain its aporias of both the liberation of colonies and anti-imperialism.

=== Overcoming modernity ===
"Overcoming modernity" was one of the catchwords that took hold of Japanese intellectuals during the war. Or perhaps it was one of the magic words. "Overcoming modernity" served as a symbol that was associated with the "Greater East Asian War".

In denouncing the intelligentsia for their wartime collaboration, it is common to lump these two symposiums together.

Rather my task is to distinguish among the symbolization of the symposiums, its ideas, and those who exploited these ideas.

It is difficult if not virtually impossible to strip the ideology from ideas, or to extract the ideas from ideology. But we must recognize the relative independence of ideas from the systems or institutions that exploit them, we must risk the difficulty of distinguishing the actual ideas. Otherwise it would be impossible to draw forth the energy buried within them. In other words, it would be impossible to form tradition.

After the defeat of 1945, Japanese journalism was full of discussion surrounding the issue of war responsibility, particularly that intellectuals and a famous wartime symposium entitled "Overcoming Modernity" which involved literary critic Kobayashi Hideo and Kyoto-school philosopher Nishitani Keiji. Wartime intellectuals were classified into three groups: Literary World, the "Japanese Romantics" (such as Yasuda Yojiro) and the Kyoto School. The "Overcoming Modernity" symposium was held in wartime Japan in (1942) and sought to interpret Japanese imperialism’s Asian mission in a positive historical light, as not any kind of simple fawning on Fascism, but rather ultimately, a step in the proper direction of Japan's destiny as an integral part of Asia. This was only a step, however, as, according to Takeuchi, while highlighting the aporias of modernity, the "Overcoming Modernity" debates failed to make those aporias themselves the subject of thought.

Critic Odagiri Hideo criticized the symposium as an "ideological campaign consisting in the defense and theorization of the militaristic tennō state and the submission to its war system". His view was accepted widely in post-war Japan. However, Takeuchi strongly opposed this easy pseudo-leftist formula.

The Pacific War's dual aspects of colonial invasion and anti-imperialism were united, and it was by this time impossible to separate these aspects.

For the Kyoto School, it was dogma that was important; they were indifferent to reality. I don't even think that they represented a "defense of the fait accompli that might makes right." These philosophers disregarded the facts.

Yasuda was at one and the same time a "born demagogue" and a "spiritual treasure"; he could not have been a spiritual treasure were he not also a demagogue. This is the Japanese spirit itself. Yasuda represents something illimitable, he is an extreme type of Japanese universalist from which there is no escape. ... The intellectual role played by Yasuda was that of eradicating thought through the destruction of all categories. ... This may be the voice of heaven or earth, but it is not human language. It must be a revelation of the "souls of our Imperial ancestors." There is not even any usage of the "imperial we." This is a medium. And the role that everyone had "eagerly anticipated" was that of the medium itself, who appears at the end as the "lead actor in a great farce." Yasuda played this role brilliantly. By destroying all values and categories of thought, he relieved the thinking subject of all responsibility.

Kobayashi Hideo was able to divest all meaning from facts, but he could not go beyond this. Literary World could only wait for the "medium" that was Yasuda to come and announce the disarmament of ideas.

In sum, the "Overcoming Modernity" symposium marked the final attempt at forming thought, an attempt that, however, failed. Such formation of thought would at least take as its point of departure the aim of transforming the logic of total war. It failed in that it ended in the destruction of thought.

In wartime 1942, Takeuchi declared a resolve on the war without fanatical chauvinism. In the postwar, Takeuchi's discussion was centred on the dual aspects of the Greater East Asia War. He attempted to resist war characteristics by using his own logic. However, for him, the wartime symposiums failed in the end. "Overcoming Modernity" resulted in scholastic chaos. Kobayashi Hideo of Literary World, who beat "World-Historical Standpoint" of the Kyoto School, was unworthy at this time. On behalf of such Kobayashi, Yasuda Yojuro of the Japanese Romantics showed only contempt.

=== National literature criticism ===
During 1951 to 1953, Takeuchi argued with literary critic, Sei Itō over the nature of a national literature (cf. Treaty of San Francisco). In 1954, Takeuchi published Kokumin Bungaku-ron [Theory of a national literature]. He criticized Japanese modernism for avoiding the problem of the "nation". Takeuchi envisaged national literature as needing to address the aporia of the nation as a cultural practice.

=== Foresight and mistakes ===
In 1960, the Japanese government rammed a revised version of the Treaty of Mutual Cooperation and Security through the House of Representatives. Takeuchi saw it undemocratic and he decided to resign as professor of Tokyo Metropolitan University. Takeuchi attempted to generalize war experiences of the Japanese people to establish Japanese democratic subjectivity. As a result, he failed to accomplish his goal. Takeuchi said, "Now, I think the Japanese nation will die out. Maybe, there is a possibility to be restored to life in the future. However, Japan is stateless in the present."

== "Asia as method" ==
=== Lu Xun ===
"According to Takeuchi, the core part of Lu Xun 'is awareness of the literature which was acquired through a confrontation with politics'. Literature in itself is directly powerless. However, as a result, literature could be involved in politics by devoting literature to literature. A writer could be powerful if he would dig down mental "darkness" and realize self-denial and self-innovation without dependence. Lu Xun was aware of this, so Takeuchi calls it "reform" ('eshin').

=== Chinese modernity and Japanese modernity ===
For Takeuchi, Japanese society was authoritarian and discriminatory. Takeuchi criticized Japanese modernists and modernization theorists who adopted a stopgap measure and recognized Japan as superior to Asia aiming at though revolutions. Takeuchi argued that Chinese modernity qualitatively surpassed the Japanese model. However, those modernists looked down on Asia and concluded Japan was not Asian. Generally speaking, the Japanese Meiji modernists had a tendency to interpret Asia as backward.

For Takeuchi, Japan and his greatest "darkness" were nothing but the issue of war responsibility. In What is modernity? (1948), Takeuchi stated:

"Ultranationalism and Japanism were once fashionable. These were to have banished Europe; they were not to have banished the slave structure that accommodates Europe. Now modernism is fashionable as a reaction against these ideologies, but the structure that accommodates modernity is still not problematized. Japan, in other words, attempts to replace the master; it does not seek independence. This is equivalent to treating Tojo Hideki as a backward student, so that other honor students remain in power in order to preserve the honor student culture itself. It is impossible to negate Tojo by opposing him: one must go beyond him. To accomplish this, however, one must even utilize him."

=== Japanese Asianism ===
Takeuchi admitted modern Japanese Asianism ended with an empty official slogan "Greater East Asia Co-Prosperity Sphere" and Japanese defeat of 1945 after all. In post-war Japan, the Greater East Asia War thoroughly denied at all. Takeuchi questioned Japanese pacifism which led to lose the attitudes and responsibilities towards Asia as an Asian nation. Takeuchi depressed such a situation. He set to reviewing Japanese modern history through Asianism.

Takeuchi edited an anthology of Asianism in which he commented that Asianism is not an ideology but a trend and that it is impossible to distinguish between "invasion" and "solidarity" in Japanese Asianism. He explained that "Asianism" originated from Tokichi Tarui and Yukichi Fukuzawa in the 1880s. The former Tarui argued for unionizing Japan and Korea equally to strengthen Greater East Asian security. Takeuchi appreciated Tarui's work as an unprecedented masterpiece. The latter Fukuzawa argued for Japan casting off Asia who was barbarian and vulgar company. Takeuchi appreciated Fukuzawa's article as a stronger appeal to the public than Tarui's. The victories of the First Sino-Japanese War and the Russo-Japanese War made Japanese solidarity with Asia further and further. After the victories of the above wars, Japan inclined to build a "new order" in East Asia. Japan could not be a hope of Asia. Takeuchi indicated Japanese structural defect derived from wrong honours. He interpreted Japanese Asianism as Ko-A (raising Asia) taken over Datsu-A (casting off Asia).

For Takeuchi, Asia is not a geographical concept but a concept against "modern Europe", and so, Japan is non-Asian. When the Japanese accomplish to overcome modernity, they can be Asian. By "modern Europe", it is feudal class society full of discrimination and authoritarianism. "Asia" could be liberation from imperialism, which cut off a relationship between dominant and subject. Perhaps, his views were non-realist and progressive in a sense.

Takeuchi wished Japan to be Asianized. The concept of Asia is nothing but an ideal for him. He said: "In a political dimension, post-war Bandung conference made an idea of Asianness in history". Referring to Rabindranath Tagore and Lu Xun, Takeuchi addressed:

Rather the Orient must re-embrace the West, it must change the West itself in order to realize the latter's outstanding cultural values on a greater scale. Such a rollback of culture or values would create universality. The Orient must change the West in order to further elevate those universal values that the West itself produced. This is the main problem facing East-West relations today, and it is at once a political and cultural issue.

=== The origin of peace ===
After 1945, Takeuchi has called upon the normalization between China and Japan. In 1972, the Joint Communiqué of the Government of Japan and the Government of the People's Republic of China was concluded. Takeuchi criticized the Japanese attitudes towards the past. The issues of history have been a big concern in the Sino-Japanese relations.

== Major works ==
- What Is Modernity?: Writings of Takeuchi Yoshimi, Columbia University Press (2005) edited, translated, and with an introduction by Richard F. Calichman
  - Ways of introducing culture: focusing upon Lu Xun (1948)
  - What is modernity? (1948)
  - The question of politics and literature (1948)
  - Hu Shih and Dewey (1952)
  - Overcoming modernity (1959)
  - Asia as method (1960)

== See also ==
- Lu Xun
- Masao Maruyama
- Nationalism
- Orientalism
- Pan-Asianism
- Postcolonialism
- Shuichi Kato
- Shunsuke Tsurumi
- Walter Benjamin

== Bibliography ==
- Beasley, William G. (1987) "Japan and Pan-Asianism: Problems of Definition" in Hunter (1987)
- Calichman, Richard F. (2004) Takeuchi Yoshimi: displacing the west, Cornell University East Asia Program
- Calichman, Richard F. [ed. and trans.] (2005) What Is Modernity?: Writings of Takeuchi Yoshimi, Columbia University Press
- Calichman, Richard F. [ed. and trans.] (2008) Overcoming Modernity: Cultural Identity in Wartime Japan, Columbia University Press
- Chen, Kuan-Hsing & Chua Beng Huat [eds.] (2007) The Inter-Asia cultural studies reader, Routledge
- Duus, Peter [ed.] (1988) The Cambridge history of Japan: The twentieth century, vol. 6, Cambridge University Press
- Gordon, Andrew [ed.] (1993) Postwar Japan as history, University of California Press
- Hunter, Janet [ed.] (1987) Aspects of Pan-Asianism, Suntory Toyota International Centre for Economics and Related Disciplines, London School of Economics and Political Science
- Kapur, Nick (2018). Japan at the Crossroads: Conflict and Compromise after Anpo. Harvard University Press. ISBN 9780674988484.
- Katzenstein, Peter J. & Takashi Shiraishi [eds.] (1997) Network Power: Japan and Asia, Cornell University Press
- Koschmann, J. Victor (1993) "Intellectuals and Politics" in Gordon (1993), pp. 395–423
- Koschmann, J. Victor (1997) "Asianism's Ambivalent Legacy" in Katzenstein et al. (1997), pp. 83–110
- McCormack, Gavan (1996/2001) The Emptiness of Japanese Affluence, M.E. Sharp
- Oguma, Eiji (2002) "Minshu" to "Aikoku": Sengo-Nihon no Nashonarizumu to Kokyosei, Shinyosha, pp. 394–446, pp. 883–94
- Olson, Lawrence (1992) Ambivalent moderns: portraits of Japanese cultural identity, Rowman & Littlefield
- Saaler, Sven & J. Victor Koschmann [eds.] (2007) Pan-Asianism in Modern Japanese History: Colonialism, regionalism and borders, Routledge
- Sun, Ge (2001) "How does Asia mean?" in Chen et al. (2007)
- Takeuchi, Yoshimi (1980–82) Takeuchi Yoshimi zenshu, vols.1-17, Chikuma Shobo
- Takeuchi, Yoshimi; Marukawa, Tetsushi & Masahisa Suzuki [eds.] (2006) Takeuchi Yoshimi Serekushon: "Sengo Shiso" wo Yomi-naosu, vols.1-2, Nihon Keizai Hyoron-sha
- Tanaka, Stefan (1993) Japan's Orient: rendering pasts into history, University of California Press
