= Toshiko Sekiya =

Japanese singer

- 関屋敏子
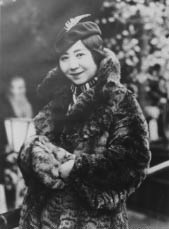
- Toshiko Sekiya, 1936
- Born: March 12, 1904; Tokyo, Japan
- Died: November 23, 1941 (age 37); Japan
- Other name: Sekiya Toshiko
- Occupations: Singer, composer
- Relatives: Matsudaira Yoshinaga (great-grandfather); Charles Le Gendre (grandfather); Ichimura Uzaemon XV (uncle)

Toshiko Sekiya (March 12, 1904 – November 23, 1941, in Japanese 関屋敏子, in kana せきや としこ), also written Sekiya Toshiko, was a Japanese singer and composer. As a soprano she was noted for her exceptional vocal control and precision of tone. She wrote several songs and operas, some left unfinished after she took her own life at the early age of 37.

== Early life and education ==
Sekiya was born in Tokyo, the daughter of businessman Yonosuke Sekiya. Her maternal grandfather was French-born American diplomat and Union Army veteran Charles Le Gendre. Her uncle was a kabuki actor, Ichimura Uzaemon XV. Matsudaira Yoshinaga was her great-grandfather.

Sekiya began studying and performing music as a small girl, including an event where she sang two songs for the Empress Shōken. She studied at Tokyo University of the Arts and with opera singers Tamaki Miura, Rosina Storchio, and Adolfo Sarcoli. She moved to Italy for further studies. In 1928, she earned a diploma from the Royal Academia Filarmonica di Bologna.

== Career ==
Sekiya had a lyric soprano voice. She sang on opera stages and gave recitals in Spain, Germany, Italy, England, and the United States. A Los Angeles critic in 1931 described her as possessing "an indescribable sweetness and charm", and Sekiya's own compositions in the program as "oddly beautiful and fascinating." Her clothing, hairstyles, shoes, and skin were described in press reports.

Sekiya made several recordings as a singer, in 1929 for the Gramaphone label, and in 1932 for the Victor label. She appeared in one of the first Japanese sound films, Komoriuta (1930), directed by Shigeyoshi Suzuki. She wrote and published an opera, Onatsu Kyoran (1933). She starred in the first production of the opera; she also designed the sets and contributed to the choreography. Her second opera, Futari Kuzuba, was first produced in Japan in 1935. In her later years, she mentored a young American singer, Elizabeth Misako Russell, and encouraged a young Canadian singer, Aiko Saita.

== Personal life and death ==
Sekiya married Gorō Yagyū, a member of the minor Japanese nobility, in 1937. The marriage was not a happy one, and they divorced in 1941. That same year, on 23 November, suffering from overwork and despondent at the breakdown of her marriage, she took an overdose of sleeping pills (Note: Earlier accounts state that she had hanged herself, but this is inaccurate.) and died at the age of 37. In her suicide note, left on the back cover of the sheet music for her song Noibara (野いばら, "Wild Rose"), she referred to herself in the third person, asking that people remember her and the art of Japanese music:

Even if Toshiko Sekiya were to fall now at the age of thirty-eight, I hope that her fragrant name, like that of the cherry blossom, will never disappear for all eternity, as of this very moment. And I ask that her honour be preserved forever, so that for a million years, for countless ages, she may serve as an example that teaches the world the purity of the human heart. Please let the dignity of Great Japanese Art be upheld.

— Toshiko Sekiya

Her grave is located on the grounds of Sōji Temple in Yokohama.

== Compositions ==
- O-natsu seijūrō (お夏狂乱), opera, 1933
- Noibara (野いばら), song
- Hama uta (浜唄), song
- Futari Kuzuba (二人葛葉), opera, 1935
- Tomoe Gozen (巴御前), opera, 1941 (her last work), based on the legend of the onna-musha (female samurai) of the same name

== Discography ==
- Tsubomi no hana (莟の花), Nippon Record
- Maria Mari (マリアマリ), Nippon Record
- Edo Komoriuta / Edo Lullaby (江戸子守唄), Nippon Record
- Sanza jigure (さんざ時雨), Nippon Record
- Funiculì, Funiculà (フニクリ・フニクラ), Nippon Record
- Noibara (野いばら), Nippon Record
- Karatachi no hana (からたちの花), Columbia Records, children's song composed by Kōsaku Yamada, text by Hakushū Kitahara
- Nīna no shi (ニーナの死, a Japanese recording of the aria Tre giorni son che Nina), Victor Records
- Yotsuba no kurōbā (四葉のクローバー, Four-Leaf Clover by Rudolph Reuter), Victor Records
- Furusato no kaika (故郷の廃家), Victor Records
- La Paloma (ラ・パロマ), Victor Records

In 1987, her recordings were digitised and re-released by Victor Entertainment.

== Filmography ==
- Komoriuta (子守歌), 1930, dir. Shigeyoshi Suzuki (her only film appearance)
