= Osamu Shimizu =

Japanese composer (1911–1986)

Osamu Shimizu (Japanese: 清水 脩, Shimizu Osamu) (4 November 1911, Tennōji-ku, Osaka – 29 October 1986, Tokyo) was a Japanese composer.

== Biography ==
Shimizu was a Japanese classical music composer in both the Japanese and Western Style. He was the son of a Gagaku-musician. He studied composition (music) at Tokyo National University of Fine Arts and Music in Tokyo from 1936 to 1939 under Kunihiko Hashimoto and music theory under Hosokawa Midori. In 1939, his "Hana ni yose taru butoh suite" was selected as the first prize winner in the composition section of the 8th Music Competition.

In Japan, Shimizu is most known for composing operas, choral works and songs. He also composed for solo instruments including shakuhachi and koto. Among Pure Land Buddhists, both in Japan and in other countries, especially in Hawaii and California in the United States, he is known for his Gathas (Buddhist music) introduced in the late 1950s sponsored by the Hongwanji Temple in Hawaii. A recording of Ondokusan II was released by Buddhist Churches of America, performed by the opera vocalist Mika Shigematsu with piano accompaniment by Rae Imamura for the BCA Shin Buddhist Service Book in 1994.

Shimizu's opera Shuzenji Monogatari is considered a part of the standard repertoire, and was performed at the New National Theatre, Tokyo in 2009.

Regarded as a pioneering post-war domestic opera along with Dan Ikuma's "Yuzuru", it was conducted by Wakasugi Hiroshi of the NNTT. It was staged by Kabuki actor and designated Living National Treasure Sakata Tojuro.

== Compositions ==
=== Works for orchestra ===
- Dance Suite Flowers Setaru
- India Melodic - Four Movements
- Symfonieën nr. 1-3

=== Operas ===
First performance in	Title	Act	Première	Libretto
1954	修善寺物語 Tale of Shuzenji (Shuzenji Monogatari) (Also known as The Mask Maker's Story)	1 Act	4 November 1954, Osaka	Kido Okamoto (1872–1939)
1956	炭焼姫 The Charcoal Princess		1 November 1956, Osaka	
1956	青空を射つ男 The Man Who Shoots at the Blue Sky		26 November 1956, Osaka	
1957	セロ弾きのゴーシュ Gauche, the Violoncellist		11 October 1957, Osaka	
1962	歌う骸骨 The Singing Skeleton		15 March 1962, Osaka	
1964	俊 寛 Shunkan	1 Act	18 November 1964, Osaka	
1965	The Merciful Poet			
1967	Sumiyaki-hime		19 December 1967, Tokyo, Toshi Center Hall	
1968	婿選び Muko-Erabi (The Marriage Contest)		3 October 1968, Los Angeles, University of California - Berkeley	
1970	大仏開眼 Daibutsu-Kaigan		2 October 1970, Tokyo	
1971	生田川 Ikuta Gawa		10 November 1971, Tokyo	
1973	Yokobue		15 June 1973, Tokyo, Yubin Chokin Hall (Nihon Opera Kyokai)	
1973	吉四六昇天 Kitchomu Shoten		1973, Oita	
1978	Shishiodori no Hajimari		4 October 1978 Tokyo, Yubin Chokin Hall (Nihon Opera Kyokai)	
1979	Aozora wo Utsu Otoko		14 September 1979, Tokyo, Toshi Center Hall	

=== Works for chorus ===
- 1940 Song of the Plateau
  1. The summer wind
  2. Apple fields
  3. Birch
- 1945/1967 Flowers Japan Chorus
  1. Wilderness wild chrysanthemum
  2. Bellflower
  3. Rhododendron
  4. Usuki Minoru
  5. Flower Tea
  6. Fuji
  7. Pear flower
  8. Grass Mizuhiki
  9. Crape myrtle
  10. Sesame flowers
- 1948–1949 Chorus Pierrot and Moonlight Suite, for male chorus - lyrics: Horiguchi Daigaku
  1. Moonlight
  2. Autumn Clown
  3. Piero
  4. Piero grief
  5. Pierrette and Pierrot in the moonlight and arabesque
- 1950 Sohran Bushi (Fisherman's Work Song) - lyrics: From Hokkaido
- 1950 Uta Cattle - lyrics: from southern Iwate Prefecture
- 1950–1952 Frog Song - lyrics: Shinpei Kusano
- 1951 Bluebird - lyrics: Horiguchi Daigaku
- 1952 Ode Mausoleum - lyrics: Nagata Tsuneo
- 1953 Reed Leaf Whistle - lyrics: Yoshio Yabuta
- 1954 Ode Cloud - Eulogy of Cloud and Mist - lyrics: Yoshi Kiyoshi Kawakami
- 1955 Solitary - Solitude - lyrics: Nagata Tsuneo
- 1956 Lass Section - lyrics: from Akita Prefecture
- 1956 Morning - Morning - lyrics: Nagata Tsuneo
- 1956 Song of the Tribe Tsuuo Taiwan

=== Vocal music ===
- Ainu No Upopo - (Three Ainu Folk Songs)
- Song of Past Days - lyrics: Chuya Nakahara

=== Gathas (Buddhist music) ===
- Nembutsu
- Ondokusan II

=== Chamber music ===
- Music for the Poem "Extract Keiko Tomo", for koto, flute, clarinet, violin, altviolin, cello and permission
- String Quartet
- The Crab-Continent, for tenor saxophon and piano

=== Work for traditional Japanese instruments ===
- 1941 Muttsu no danshô - Six Fragments for koto (Variations)
- 1958 Koto nimen no tame no shôhin - A Little Piece for two koto
- 1981 Koto Dokuso no Tamenu - Muttsu no Dansho, for koto
- Trios Esquisses, for two koto and jushichi-gen

== Bibliography ==
- Hitoshi Matsushita: A checklist of published instrumental music by Japanese composers, Tokyo: Academia Music Ltd., 1989. 181 p., ISBN 978-4-870-17039-1
- Robin J. Heifetz: East-West Synthesis in Japanese Composition: 1950-1970, University of California Press, 1984
- Paul Frank, Burchard Bulling, Florian Noetzel, Helmut Rosner: Kurzgefasstes Tonkünstler Lexikon - Zweiter Teil: Ergänzungen und Erweiterungen seit 1937, 15. Aufl., Wilhelmshaven: Heinrichshofen, Band 1: A-K. 1974. ISBN 3-7959-0083-2; Band 2: L-Z. 1976. ISBN 3-7959-0087-5
- Japanese composers and their works (since 1868), Tokyo: 1972
