= Biwako Hall Center for the Performing Arts, Shiga =

Concert hall in Tokyo, Japan

Biwako Hall Center for the Performing Arts, Shiga 滋賀県立芸術劇場びわ湖ホール
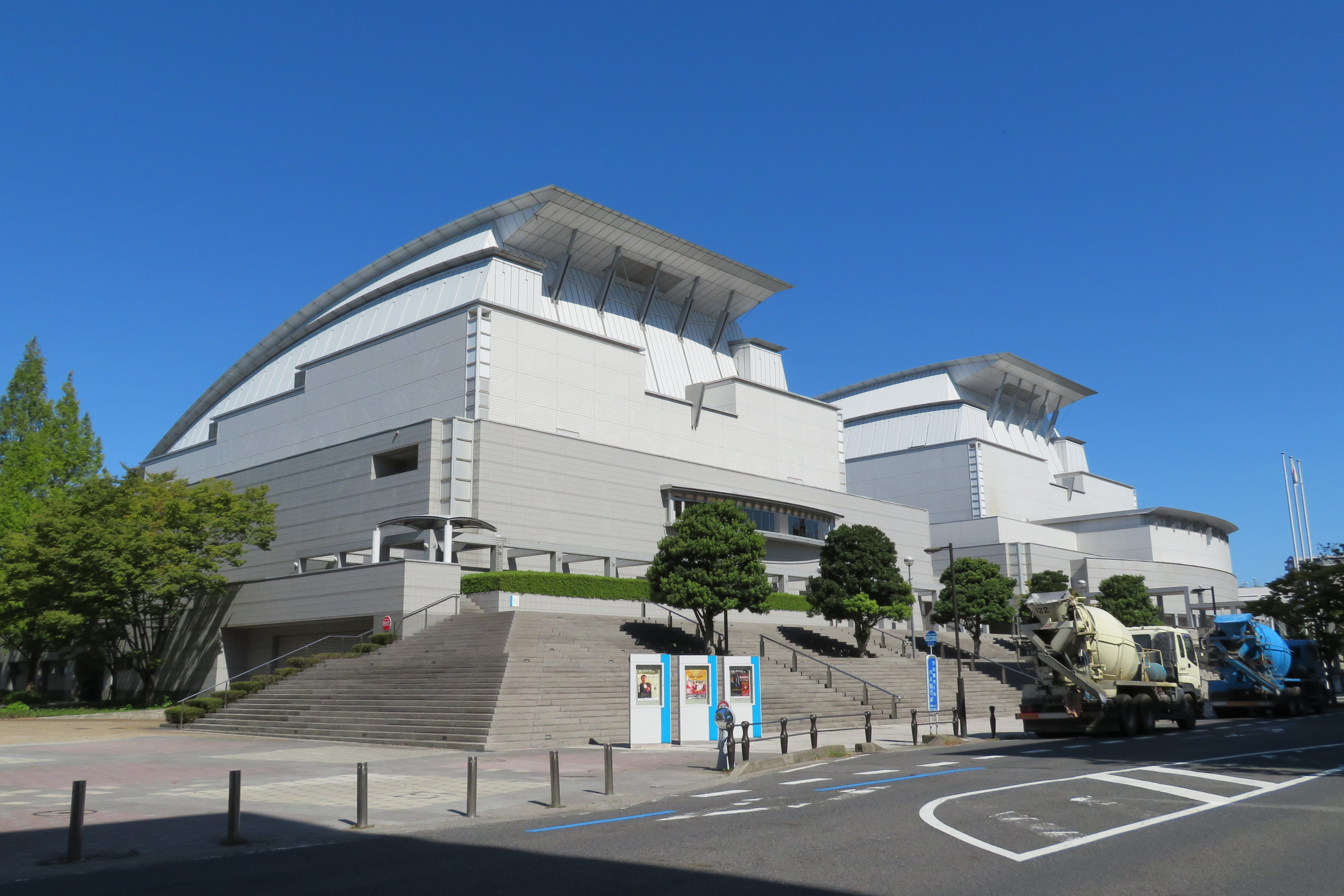

General information
- Location: 15-1 Uchidehama, Ōtsu, Shiga Prefecture, Japan
- Coordinates: 35°00′25″N 135°52′38″E
- Opened: 5 September 1998

Technical details
- Floor count: 6

Other information
- Seating capacity: 1,848 (main theatre); 804 (medium theatre); 323 (ensemble hall)

Website
- Official website

Biwako Hall Center for the Performing Arts, Shiga (滋賀県立芸術劇場びわ湖ホール, Shiga Kenritsu Geijutsu Gekijō Biwa-ko Hōru) is a performing arts centre that opened beside Lake Biwa in Ōtsu, Shiga Prefecture, Japan in 1998. Biwako Hall is one of Japan's leading centres for opera and is home to the Biwako Hall Vocal Ensemble. The three halls also host performances of ballet, orchestral and choral works, chamber music, world music, jazz, plays, and traditional performing arts.

== Gallery ==
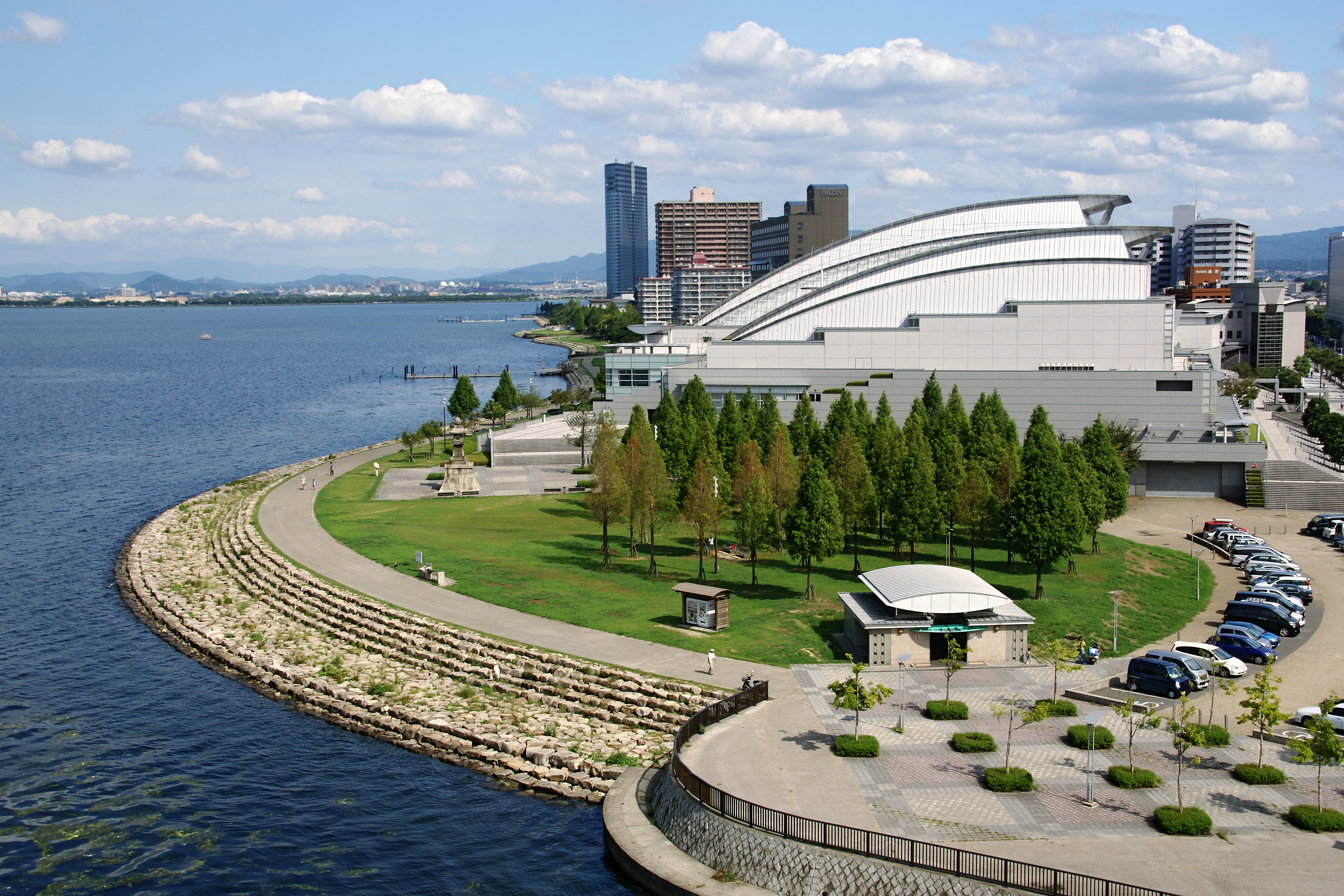
Biwako Hall beside Lake Biwa

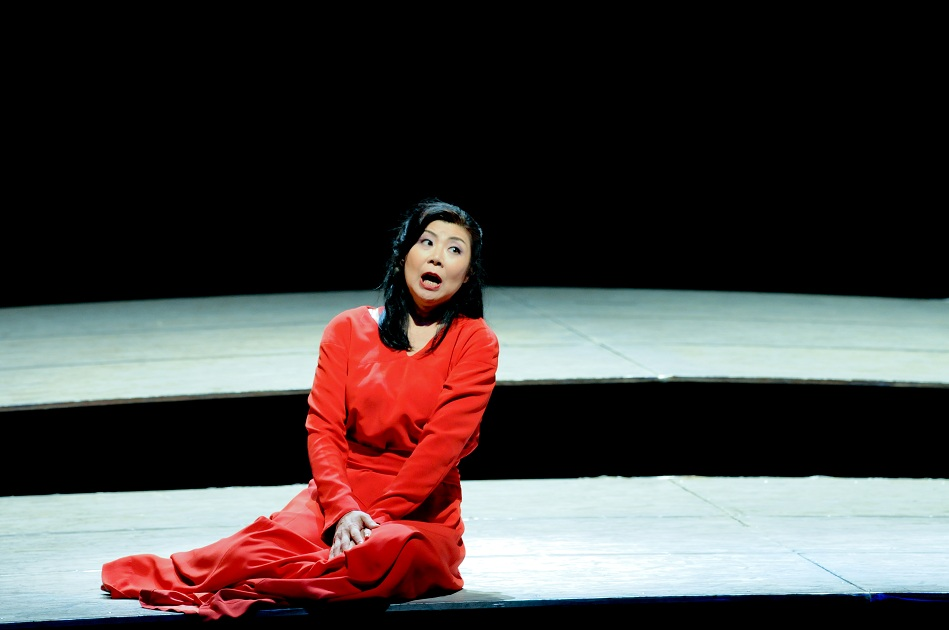
Mezzo-soprano Koyama Yumi singing Isolde at Biwako Hall in 2010

== See also ==
- Kyoto Concert Hall
- Ishiyama-dera
