= Yūzuru =

Opera by Ikuma Dan

Yūzuru (夕鶴, Yūzuru) (Twilight Crane), is a Japanese opera in one act composed by Ikuma Dan after the play of the same name by Junji Kinoshita.

Ikuma Dan initially wrote incidental music for Kinoshita's play in 1949. Later, determined to transform the music into an opera, he approached Kinoshita who agreed to release the play under the condition that it was set to music word for word. Dan started composing the opera and finished the work a year later in 1951. The première was held at Osaka Asahi Hall on January 30, 1952.

Dan revised the opera in 1956 and the revised version premièred at the Zurich Music Festival on June 27, 1957.

In 1994, the 600th performance of the opera with the composer conducting the Tokyo City Philharmonic Orchestra was recorded and released by Columbia Music Entertainment.

The opera lasts approximately one hour and fifty minutes. The vocal score is published by Zen-On Music Company Ltd.

== Roles ==
Japanese	English	Voice type	Premiere Cast, 1952 (Conductor: Ikuma Dan)
与ひょう	Yohyō, a simple-minded farmer living happily with Tsū	tenor	
つう	Tsū, a crane saved by Yohyō, assumes human form to become his wife	soprano	
運ず	Unzu, villain attempting to deceive Yohyō	baritone	
惣ど	Sōdo, villain attempting to deceive Yohyō	bass	
子供たち	The Village Children	children's chorus	

== Synopsis ==
The story takes place in an isolated mountain village in ancient Japan. It is winter. The scene is the interior and exterior of Yohyō's snow-covered, straw-thatched hut.

The simple-minded peasant Yohyō lives with his gentle and beautiful wife, Tsū. Once, long before, he saved the life of a wounded crane by pulling an arrow from its body. Unbeknownst to Yohyō, the crane assumed human form to become his wife. Tsū loves her husband with all her body and soul. Wishing to make life easier for Yohyō, she secretly weaves a gorgeous cloth from her own feathers. Wrapped in the chaste love of his wife, the simple-hearted Yohyō has forgotten the evils of human greed.

The villagers Sōdo and Unzu learn of the valuable cloth and impress upon Yohyō that much merriment and wealth awaits them in the city if his wife were to weave more cloth for which they would be handsomely paid. Deceived by the words of his evil friends and lured by the promise of riches and pleasures, Yohyō urges the reluctant Tsū to weave more of the valuable fabric.

Tsū sadly wonders why man is never satisfied with love, always longing for riches. In response to her beloved husband's insistent demands, she resolves to weave another cloth knowing any further sacrifice could be fatal.

Overwhelmed and despondent at the thought of her tragic circumstances, Tsū falls unconscious in the snow. Yohyō carries her gently to the fireside to revive her. He does not understand her spiritual suffering. Tsū asks if he still yearns for riches, but Yohyō has become a prisoner of greed and insists that she continue weaving the cloth. Broken-hearted, Tsū enters the back room to finish her work.

Tsū returns hovering near death. She hands the magnificent cloth to her husband. Leaving her passionate heart behind, Tsū transforms back into a crane and flaps her way into the snowy twilit night on her final journey. Yohyō realizes that he has lost the priceless affection of his devoted wife. Clutching the precious cloth in his hands, he watches her disappear from sight.

== Orchestration ==
2 flutes (piccolo), 2 oboes, 2 clarinets, 2 bassoons, 4 horns, 2 trumpets, 3 trombones, 1 tuba, percussion (timpani, cymbals, triangle, gong, snare drum, bass drum), harp and strings

== Discography ==
- 1959: Ikuma Dan conducting the Tokyo Philharmonic Orchestra with the Toshiba Singing Angels, Toshiba-EMI
- 1994: Ikuma Dan conducting the Tokyo City Philharmonic Orchestra, Columbia Music Entertainment (Live Recording of the 600th Performance)
- 1997: Hiroshi Wakasugi conducting the Yomiuri Nippon Symphony Orchestra, Victor Entertainment
