= Taijun Takeda =

Japanese novelist

Takeda Taijun
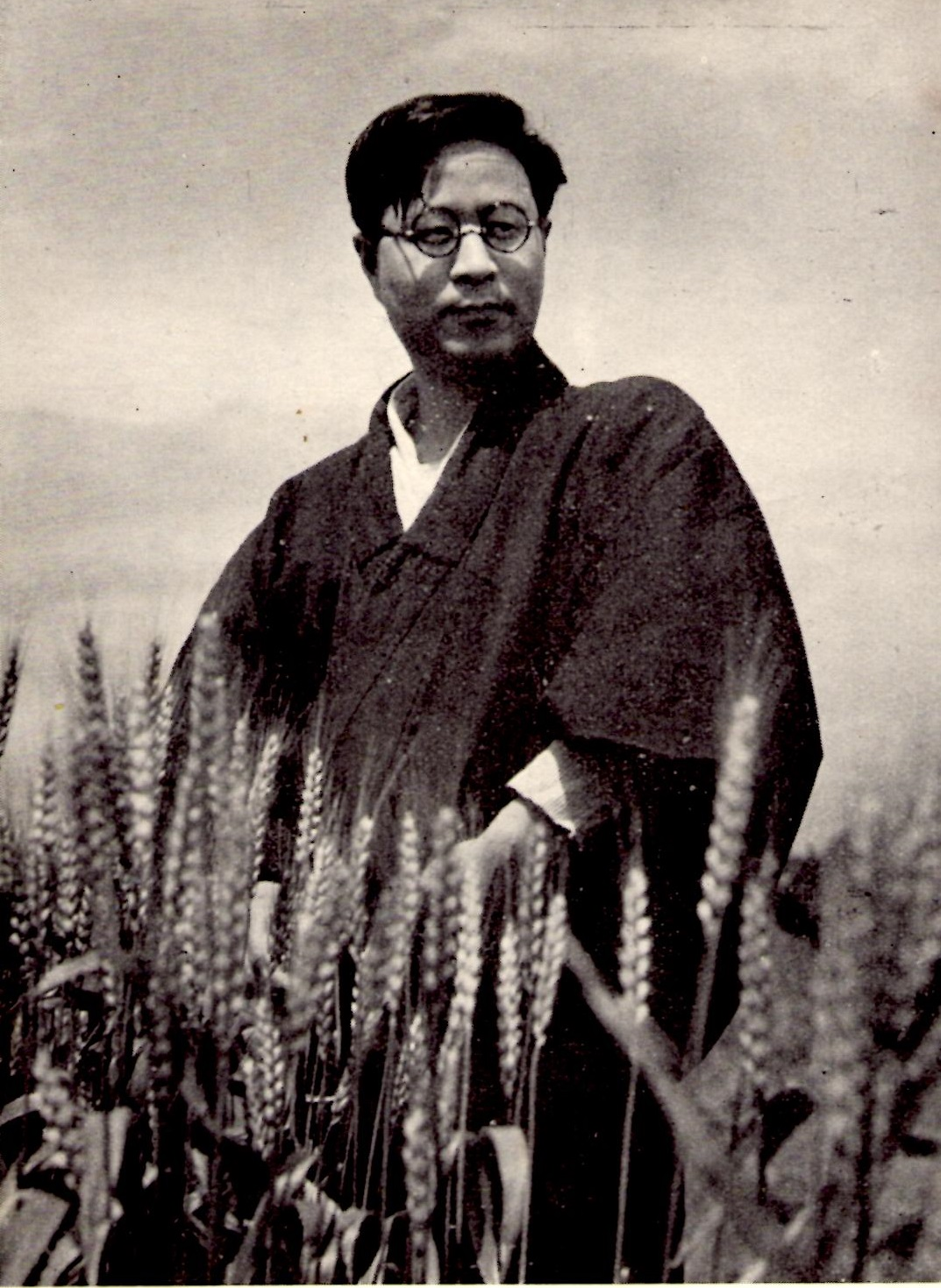
- Born: February 12, 1912; Japan Tokyo
- Died: October 5, 1976 (aged 64); Tokyo
- Other name: 武田 泰淳
- Occupations: Buddhist priest, novelist

Taijun Takeda (武田 泰淳, Takeda Taijun; February 12, 1912 – October 5, 1976) was a Japanese novelist and Buddhist priest active as one of the first post-war generation writers, and a noted influencer on Chinese literature.

His Dharma name was (恭蓮社謙誉上人泰淳和尚).

== Biography ==
Takeda was the second son of a Buddhist priest of the Jōdo-shū sect, and was raised in a temple. He developed an early interest in both Chinese literature and left-wing politics and, on graduating from high school, he chose to major in Sinology at Tokyo University in 1931. He did not complete his degree, for he withdrew from the university after being arrested for distributing leaflets critical of imperialism, which cost him a month's imprisonment. While in prison, he became acquainted with Yoshimi Takeuchi.

== Works in English ==
- This Outcast Generation and Luminous Moss, translated by Yusaburo Shibuya and Sanford Goldstein, Tuttle Books Tokyo 1967. ISBN 978-0-80480-576-6
- "The Misshapen Ones" (Igyou no Mono, 1950), translated by Edward G. Seidensticker, in ISBN 978-0-23113-804-8
