= Yokohama Minato Mirai Hall =

Concert hall in Tokyo, Japan

Yokohama Minato Mirai Hall 横浜みなとみらいホール
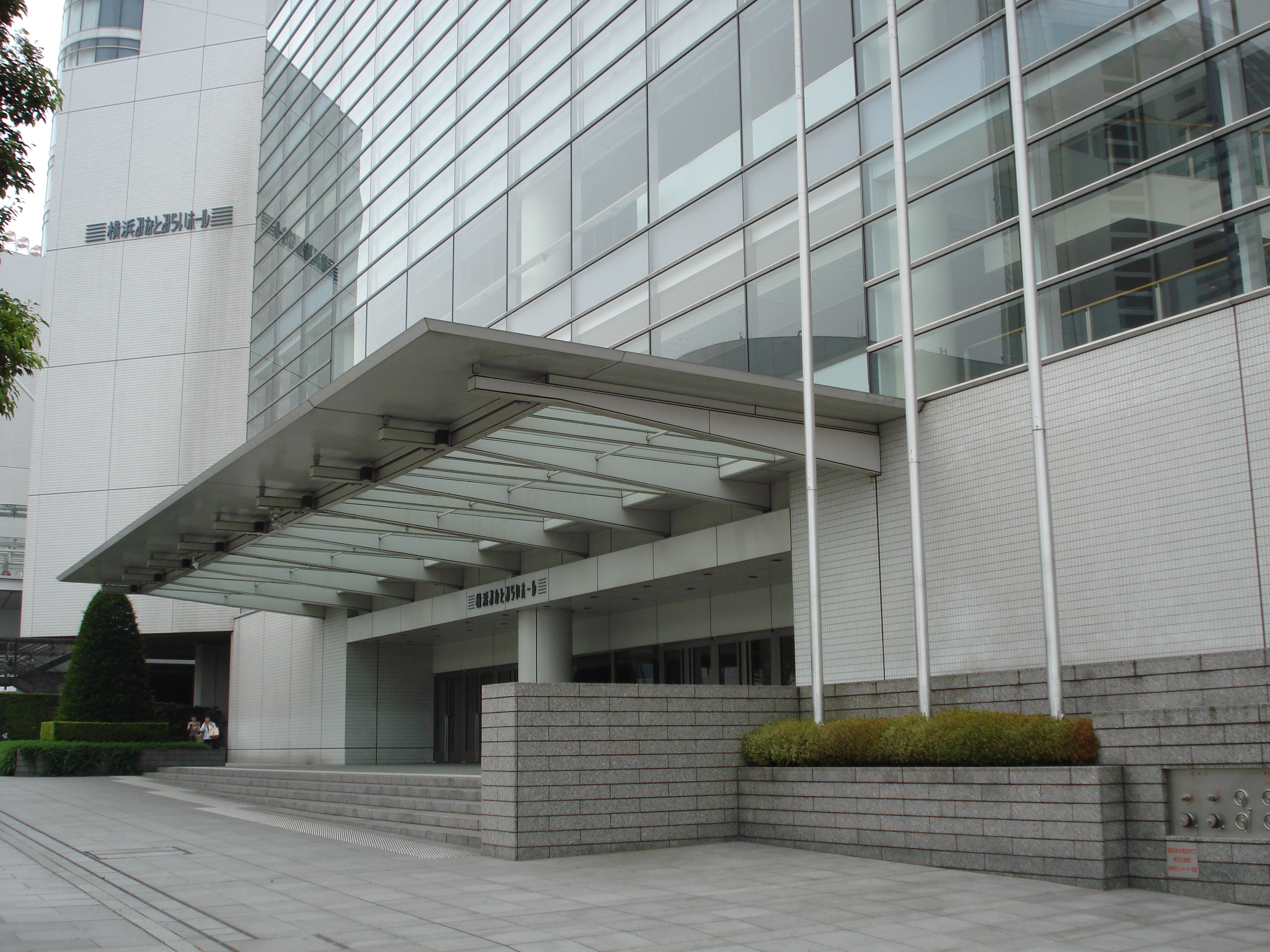
- Interactive map of the Yokohama Minato Mirai Hall 横浜みなとみらいホール area

General information
- Location: 2-3-6 Minato Mirai, Nishi-ku, Yokohama, Kanagawa Prefecture, Japan
- Coordinates: 35°27′27″N 139°38′06″E
- Opened: 31 May 1998

Other information
- Seating capacity: 2,034 (large hall); 444 (small hall)

Website
- Official website

Yokohama Minato Mirai Hall (横浜みなとみらいホール, Yokohama Minato Mirai Hōru) is a concert hall that opened in the Minato Mirai district of Yokohama, Kanagawa Prefecture, Japan in 1998. The facility includes a shoebox style large hall with a pipe organ by C. B. Fisk with 4,623 pipes and 62 stops, and a capacity of 2,034 in surround seating, and a smaller hall for chamber music, piano recitals, and the like.

== See also ==
- Yokohama Museum of Art
- Yokohama Port Museum
