= 1979 in Japan =

- Decades: 1950s; 1960s; 1970s; 1980s; 1990s
- See also: Other events of 1979; History of Japan • Timeline • Years

Events in the year 1979 in Japan. It corresponds to Shōwa 54 (昭和54年) in the Japanese calendar.

== Incumbents ==
- Emperor: Hirohito (Emperor Shōwa)
- Prime Minister: Masayoshi Ōhira (L–Kagawa, 2nd term from November 9)
- Chief Cabinet Secretary: Rokusuke Tanaka (L–Fukuoka) until November 9, Masayoshi Itō (L–Fukushima)
- Chief Justice of the Supreme Court: Masao Okahara until March 31, Takaaki Hattori from April 2
- President of the House of Representatives: Shigeru Hori (L–Saga) until February 1, Hirokichi Nadao (L–Hiroshima) until September 7 and again from October 30
- President of the House of Councillors: Ken Yasui (L–Tokyo)
- Diet sessions: 87th (regular session opened in December 1978, to May 14), 88th (extraordinary, August 30 to September 7), 89th (special, October 30 to November 16), 90th (extraordinary, November 26 to December 11), 91st (regular, December 21 to 1980, May 19)

=== Governors ===
- Aichi Prefecture: Yoshiaki Nakaya
- Akita Prefecture: Yūjirō Obata (until 30 April); Kikuji Sasaki (starting 30 April)
- Aomori Prefecture: Shunkichi Takeuchi (until 25 February); Masaya Kitamura (starting 26 February)
- Chiba Prefecture: Kiichi Kawakami
- Ehime Prefecture: Haruki Shiraishi
- Fukui Prefecture: Heidayū Nakagawa
- Fukuoka Prefecture: Hikaru Kamei
- Fukushima Prefecture: Isao Matsudaira
- Gifu Prefecture: Yosuke Uematsu
- Gunma Prefecture: Ichiro Shimizu
- Hiroshima Prefecture: Hiroshi Miyazawa
- Hokkaido: Naohiro Dōgakinai
- Hyogo Prefecture: Tokitada Sakai
- Ibaraki Prefecture: Fujio Takeuchi
- Ishikawa Prefecture: Yōichi Nakanishi
- Iwate Prefecture: Tadashi Chida (until 30 April); Tadashi Nakamura (starting 30 April)
- Kagawa Prefecture: Tadao Maekawa
- Kagoshima Prefecture: Kaname Kamada
- Kanagawa Prefecture: Kazuji Nagasu
- Kochi Prefecture: Chikara Nakauchi
- Kumamoto Prefecture: Issei Sawada
- Kyoto Prefecture: Yukio Hayashida
- Mie Prefecture: Ryōzō Tagawa
- Miyagi Prefecture: Sōichirō Yamamoto
- Miyazaki Prefecture: Hiroshi Kuroki (until 16 June); Suketaka Matsukata (starting 5 August)
- Nagano Prefecture: Gon'ichirō Nishizawa
- Nagasaki Prefecture: Kan'ichi Kubo
- Nara Prefecture: Ryozo Okuda
- Niigata Prefecture: Takeo Kimi
- Oita Prefecture: Masaru Taki (until 27 April); Morihiko Hiramatsu (starting 28 April)
- Okayama Prefecture: Shiro Nagano
- Okinawa Prefecture: Junji Nishime
- Osaka Prefecture: Ryōichi Kuroda (until 22 April); Sakae Kishi (starting 23 April)
- Saga Prefecture: Sunao Ikeda (until 22 April); Kumao Katsuki (starting 23 April)
- Saitama Prefecture: Yawara Hata
- Shiga Prefecture: Masayoshi Takemura
- Shiname Prefecture: Seiji Tsunematsu
- Shizuoka Prefecture: Keizaburō Yamamoto
- Tochigi Prefecture: Yuzuru Funada
- Tokushima Prefecture: Yasunobu Takeichi
- Tokyo: Ryōkichi Minobe (until 22 April); Shun'ichi Suzuki (starting 23 April)
- Tottori Prefecture: Kōzō Hirabayashi
- Toyama Prefecture: Kokichi Nakada
- Wakayama Prefecture: Shirō Kariya
- Yamagata Prefecture: Seiichirō Itagaki
- Yamaguchi Prefecture: Toru Hirai
- Yamanashi Prefecture: Kunio Tanabe (until 16 February); Kōmei Mochizuki (starting 17 February)

== Events ==
- January 26 to 28 – Mitsubishi Bank hostage incident (Japanese: 三菱銀行人質事件). According to Japan National Police Agency confirmed report, a man with a hunting gun pushed into a bank branch for 42 hours, a bank robbery who took more than 30 hostages in Sumiyoshi-ku, Osaka, killing two banking staff and two police officers, the suspect was shot dead by special riot police on 28 January.
- February – The government is rocked by yet another bribery case: the Douglas-Grumman scandal
- March 20 – According to Japan Fire and Disaster Management Agency confirmed report, at least 16 construction workers death by Daishimizu Tunnel fire, during under construction in Minakami, Gunma Prefecture.
- June 28 – 29 – 5th G7 summit held in Tokyo.
- July 1 – Sony Walkman goes on sale.
- July 11 – Nihonzaka Tunnel fire. According to Japan National Police Agency confirmed report, a vehicle caught fire; 173 vehicles burned in the Nihonzaka Road Tunnel, Tomei Expressway, Shizuoka City, total seven person were lost to fire.
- October 7 – 1979 Japanese general election
- October 19 – 13 US Marines die in fire at Camp Fuji, Shizuoka Prefecture, caused by Typhoon Tip.
- November – Japan Project Industry Council (JAPIC) was found as voluntary organization. (date unknown)

== Popular culture ==
=== Arts and entertainment ===
In film, Vengeance Is Mine by Shōhei Imamura won the Best film award at the Japan Academy Prize, at the Blue Ribbon Awards and at the Mainichi Film Award, Taiyō o Nusunda Otoko by Kazuhiko Hasegawa won Best film at the Yokohama Film Festival and at the Hochi Film Awards. For a list of Japanese films released in 1979 see Japanese films of 1979.

The asadora Mā-nē-chan and Ayu no uta began in 1979. For other television, see: 1979 in Japanese television.

Books published included Shiki Natsuko by Hiroyuki Itsuki and Tenchūsatsu Nyūmon (Japanese:天中殺入門) by Sōshō Izumi. See also Category:1979 Japanese novels.

In manga, the winners of the Shogakukan Manga Award were Doza no Ippon Tsuri by Yusuke Aoyagi (general) and Toward the Terra and Kaze to Ki no Uta by Keiko Takemiya (shōnen or shōjo). Tonda Couple by Kimio Yanagisawa (shōnen) and The Star of Cottonland by Yumiko Ōshima (shōjo) won the Kodansha Manga Award. For a list of manga released in 1979 see Category:1979 manga.

In music, hit singles included "Omidezake" by Sachiko Kobayashi and "Ihojin" by Saki Kubota. The 30th Kōhaku Uta Gassen was won by the Red Team (women). Hideki Saijo won the FNS Music Festival and Judy Ongg won the 21st Japan Record Award. For Japanese music in 1979, see 1979 in Japanese music.

Japan hosted the Miss International 1979 beauty pageant, won by Filipina Melanie Marquez.

=== Sports ===
In athletics (track and field) Japan hosted the Asian Championships and was first in the medal table with 20 gold medals and a total of 59 medals.

In baseball Hiroshima Carp won the Japan Series.

In basketball Japan hosted the ABC Championship and won the second place behind China.

In football (soccer) Japan hosted the FIFA World Youth Championship, won by Argentina. Fujita Engineering won the Japan Soccer League. For the champions of the regional leagues see: 1979 Japanese Regional Leagues. For more see: 1979 in Japanese football.

== Births ==
- January 1: Koichi Domoto, idol and singer
- January 3: Rie Tanaka, voice actress
- January 7: Yōko Honna, voice actress
- January 9: Tomiko Van, singer (Do As Infinity)
- January 17
  - Masae Ueno, judoka
  - Takafumi Nishitani, former short-track skater
- January 18: Sachiko Kojima, voice actress
- February 2: Yuichi Tsuchiya, actor
- February 9: Akinori Iwamura, former professional baseball player
- February 19: Miki Furukawa, musician
- March 8: Jasmine You, musician (died 2009)
- March 20: Shinnosuke Abe, former professional baseball player
- March 26: Hiromi Uehara, jazz composer and pianist
- April 4: Bunko Kanazawa, AV idol
- April 7: Keiichi Hirano, former professional baseball pitcher
- April 10: Tsuyoshi Domoto, entertainer (KinKi Kids)
- April 18: Yusuke Kamiji, actor
- May 14: Jun Ideguchi, football player
- May 28: Atsushi Nomi, baseball pitcher
- May 30: Rie Kugimiya, voice actress and singer
- June 9: Ryoko Kuninaka, actress and singer
- June 11: Rino Nakasone Razalan, Japanese-American dancer and choreographer
- June 18: Yumiko Kobayashi, voice actress
- June 23: Shigeki Tsujimoto, football player
- July 3: Sayuri Katayama, actress, singer and lyricist
- July 16
  - Mai Nakamura, backstroke swimmer
  - Kinya Kotani, singer
- July 21: Haruki Mizuno, AV and gravure idol
- July 26: Yukihiro Aoba, football player
- August 2: Hitoshi Sogahata, football player
- August 7: Seiji Koga, football player
- August 13: Taizō Sugimura, politician
- August 28: Yuki Maeda, singer
- September 18
  - Ryu Saito, football player
  - Junichi Inamoto, football player
- September 26: Naomichi Marufuji, professional wrestler
- September 27: Shinji Ono, football player
- September 30: Yuta Minami, football player
- October 3: Yuri Ebihara, model and actress
- October 6: Emi Naito, softball player
- October 11: Reiko Takagaki, model and actress
- October 12: Rie Tomosaka, actress and popstar
- October 19: Hiromi Yanagihara, J-pop singer (died 1999)
- October 30: Yukie Nakama, actress, singer, and idol
- November 1: Atsuko Enomoto, voice actress
- November 15: Aki Nawa, ten-pin bowler
- November 24: Sachiyo Shibata, kickboxer
- November 26: Tetsuya Oishi, football player
- November 29: Shosei Koda, terrorism victim (died 2004)
- December 7
  - Hirokazu Otsubo, football player
  - Ayako Fujitani, actress
- December 9
  - Aiko Uemura, freestyle skier
  - Olivia Lufkin, singer-songwriter
- December 10 – Keiko Nemoto, voice actress
- December 21: Hinano Yoshikawa, fashion model and singer
- December 23: Yukifumi Murakami, javelin thrower
- December 25: Tatsuya Ishikawa, football player
- December 26: Kazuhiko Ikematsu, wrestler
- December 29: Moe Oshikiri, model
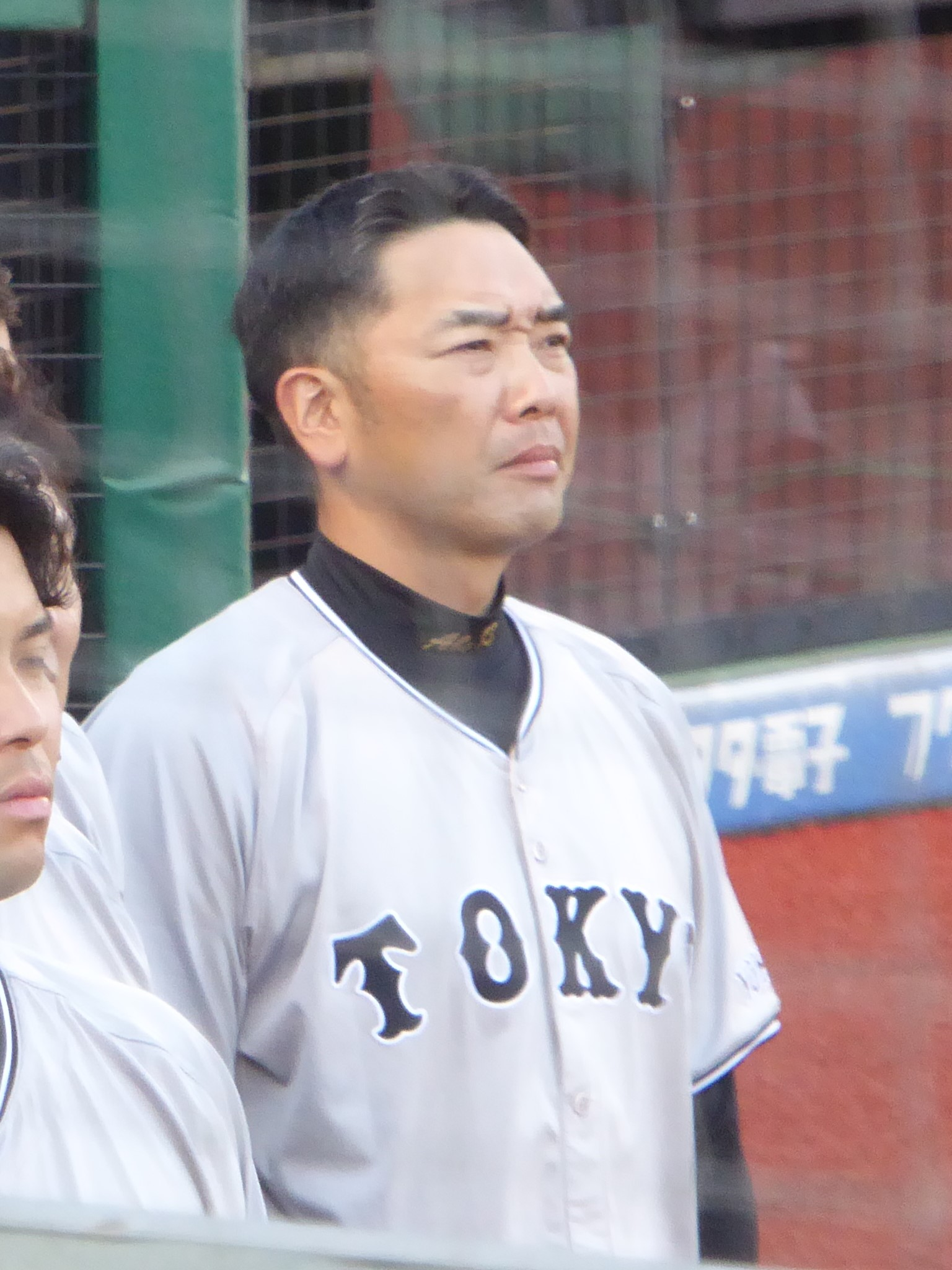
Shinnosuke Abe, current manager of Tokyo Giants

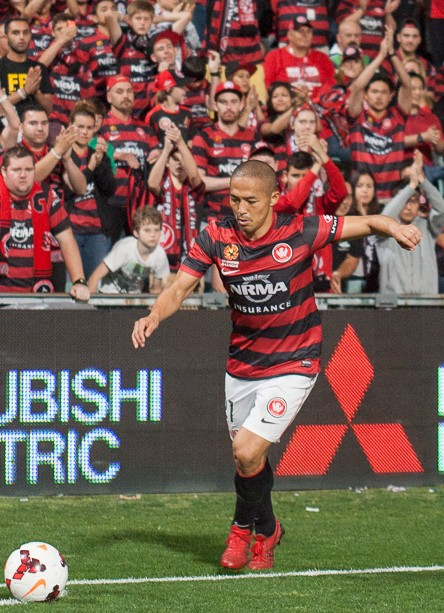
Shinji Ono, An Adelaide United 2013-2014 season

== Deaths ==
- January 12: Shunsaku Kudō, Imperial Japanese Navy officer (b. 1901)
- January 23: Motoo Ōtaguro, music critic (b. 1893)
- January 29: Yusuke Hagihara, astronomer (b. 1897)
- February 24: Yoshie Shiratori, murderer (b. 1907)
- March 25: Akinoumi Setsuo, sumo wrestler (b. 1914)
- March 26: Iwao Matsuda, senior officer in the Imperial Japanese army (b. 1895)
- April 17: Yukio Tsuda, football player (b. 1917)
- May 23: Hiroshi Ohshita, professional baseball player (b. 1922)
- May 29: Eddie Imazu, art director (b. 1897)
- July 8: Sin-Itiro Tomonaga, physicist (b. 1906)
- July 20: Shōji Yamagishi, photography critic, curator, and magazine editor (b. 1930)
- July 27: Sōkichi Takagi, admiral and political figure (b. 1893)
- August 24: Shigeharu Nakano, author and Communist Party politician (b. 1902)
- August 25: Sōgen Asahina, Rinzai zen master (b. 1891)
- September 17: Mitsuru Yoshida, author and naval officer (b. 1923)
- September 30: Shiina Etsusaburo, foreign minister of Japan from 1964 to 1966 (b. 1898)
- October 22: Mieko Kamiya, psychiatrist (b. 1914)
- November 16: Ichirō Saitō, film composer (b. 1909)
- December 25: Kenji Tomiki, aikido and judo teacher (b. 1900)

== See also ==
- 1979 in Japanese television
- List of Japanese films of 1979
