= 1944 in Japan =

- Decades: 1920s; 1930s; 1940s; 1950s; 1960s
- See also: Other events of 1944; History of Japan • Timeline • Years

Events in the year 1944 in Japan. It corresponds to Shōwa 19 (昭和19年) in the Japanese calendar.

== Incumbents ==
- Emperor: Hirohito
- Prime Minister:
  - Hideki Tōjō, until July 22
  - Kuniaki Koiso, from July 22

=== Governors ===
- Aichi Prefecture: Shinji Yoshino
- Akita Prefecture: Katsumi Osafune (until 7 January); Tadashi Hisayasuhiroshi (starting 1 August)
- Aomori Prefecture: Utsunomiya Kohei (until 1 August); Hiroo Oshima (starting 1 August)
- Ehime Prefecture: Aikawa Katsuroku (until 18 April); Chiyoji Kizawa (starting 18 April)
- Fukui Prefecture: Hatsuo Kato
- Fukushima Prefecture: Koichi Kameyama (until 18 April); Ishii Masakazu (starting 18 April)
- Gifu Prefecture: Miyoshi Shigeo (until 28 July); Masami Hashimoto (starting 28 July)
- Gunma Prefecture: Shinoyama Chiyuki (until 25 February); Ishii Einosuke (starting 25 February)
- Hiroshima Prefecture: Sukenari Yokoyama (until 1 August); Mitsuma Matsumura (starting 1 August)
- Ibaraki Prefecture: Sieve Yoshimi (until 25 August); Hisashi Imai (starting 25 August)
- Iwate Prefecture: Osamuzo Suzuki
- Kagawa Prefecture: Yoshiji Kosuga
- Kochi Prefecture: Saburo Takahashi
- Kumamoto Prefecture: Hikari Akira (until 1 August); Soga Kajimatsu (starting 1 August)
- Kyoto Prefecture: Chiyoji Yukizawa (until April); Arai Zentaro (starting April)
- Mie Prefecture: Yoshio Mochinaga
- Miyagi Prefecture: Nobuya Uchida (until 25 February); Tsurukichi Maruyama (starting 1 August)
- Miyazaki Prefecture: Tadao Nishihiro (until 1 August); Akira Taniguchi (starting 1 August)
- Nagano Prefecture: Yoshio Koriyama (until 1 August); Yasuo Otsubo (starting 1 August)
- Niigata Prefecture: Maeda Tamon
- Oita Prefecture: Motoharu Nakamura
- Okinawa Prefecture: Osamu Mori Izumi
- Saga Prefecture: Yue Yue (until 1 August); Miyazaki Kenta (starting 1 August)
- Saitama Prefecture: Sudo Tetsushin (until 1 August); Ryuichi Fukumoto (starting 1 August)
- Shiname Prefecture: Takeo Yamada
- Tochigi Prefecture: Soma Toshio
- Tokyo: Nisho Toshizo
- Toyama Prefecture:
  - until 25 February: Saka Shinya
  - 25 February-25 July: Shoichi Nishimura
  - starting 25 July: Shigero Okamoto
- Yamagata Prefecture: Akira Saito

== Events ==
- January 31-February 3 - Battle of Kwajalein
- February 17–23 - Battle of Eniwetok
- April 17-May 25 - Battle of Central Henan
- May–August - Battle of Changsha (1944)
- June 4-September 7 - Battle of Mount Song
- June 15-July 9 - Battle of Saipan
- June 15/16 - Bombing of Yawata (June 1944)
- June 19–20 - Battle of the Philippine Sea
- June 22-August 8 - Defense of Hengyang
- July 10-August 25 - Battle of Driniumor River
- July 21-August 10 - Battle of Guam (1944)
- July 24-August 1 - Battle of Tinian
- August 16-November 24 - Battle of Guilin-Liuzhou
- September 15-November 27 - Battle of Peleliu
- September 17-October 22 - Battle of Angaur
- October 10–20 - Formosa Air Battle
- December 7 - 1944 Tōnankai earthquake
- December 30–31 - Battle of Pearl Ridge

== Births ==
- January 7 - Kotaro Suzumura, economist and professor emeritus of Hitotsubashi University and Waseda University (d. 2020)
- January 14 - Makiko Tanaka, politician
- January 20 - Isao Okano, retired judoka player
- January 25 - Seigō Matsuoka, writer (d. 2024)
- January 28 - Koji Wada, actor (d. 1986)
- February 8 - Isao Shibata, former professional baseball player
- April 5 - Hiroyuki Hosoda, politician (d. 2023)
- April 7 - Makoto Kobayashi, Nobel Prize-winning physicist
- April 16 - Shoji Tabuchi, fiddler
- May 5 - Hiroaki Inoue, baseball player (d. 2025)
- May 22 - Nakamura Kichiemon II, actor, kabuki performer, and costume designer (d. 2021)
- May 29 - Masaki Sakurai, guitar maker (d. 2025)
- July 8 - Hironobu Takesaki, former Chief Justice of Japan
- July 15 - Ken Kagaya, painter and writer (d. 2003)
- August 30 - Yumiko Nogawa, actress
- September 12 - Yoshio Kikugawa, football player
- October 4 - Aki Kuroda, artist
- October 17 - Nobutaka Machimura, politician (d. 2015)

=== Unknown date ===
- Tōsha Rosen VI, percussionist in traditional Japanese theatre and dance
- Tsūzen Nakajima, print artist

== Deaths ==
- January 25 - Monzo Akiyama, admiral (b. 1891)
- February 21 - Yoshimi Nishida, general (b. 1892)
- March 29 - Kiichi Hasegawa, admiral (b. 1894)
- March 31 - Mineichi Koga, Marshal Admiral (b. 1885)
- May 24 - Matsuji Ijuin, vice admiral (b. 1893)
- July 6 - Chūichi Nagumo, admiral (b. 1887)
- July 8 - Takeo Takagi, admiral (b. 1892)
- July 10 - Yoshitsugu Saitō, lieutenant general (b. 1890)
- July 19 - Shigeo Arai, freestyle swimmer (b. 1916)
- July 28 - Takeshi Takashina, general (b. 1891)
- August 1 - Kiyochi Ogata, colonel
- August 2
  - Kakuji Kakuta, captain (b. 1890)
  - Goichi Oya, admiral
- August 11 - Hideyoshi Obata, general (b. 1890)
- October 15 - Masafumi Arima, admiral (b. 1895)
- October 26 - Hiroyoshi Nishizawa, flying ace (b. 1920)
- November 7 - Hotsumi Ozaki, journalist and soviet spy (b. 1901)
- November 18 - Tsunesaburō Makiguchi, educator (b. 1871)
- November 24 - Kunio Nakagawa, general (b. 1898)
- December 1 - Murakami Namiroku, novelist and fiction writer (b. 1865)

== See also ==
- List of Japanese films of the 1940s
