= 1942 in Japan =

- Decades: 1920s; 1930s; 1940s; 1950s; 1960s
- See also: Other events of 1942; History of Japan • Timeline • Years

Events in the year 1942 in Japan.

== Incumbents ==
- Emperor: Hirohito
- Prime Minister: Hideki Tōjō

=== Governors ===
- Aichi Prefecture: Yukisawa Chiyoji
- Akita Prefecture: Fumi
- Aomori Prefecture: Seiichi Ueda (until 9 June); Shunsuke Yamada (starting 9 June)
- Ehime Prefecture: Masatomi Hatakeda (until 7 July); Ryuichi Fukumoto (starting 7 July)
- Fukui Prefecture:
  - until 9 January: Kubota
  - 9 January-15 June: Shigeo Miyoshi
  - starting 15 June: Nagano Wakamatsu
- Fukushima Prefecture: Sumio Hisakawa (until 7 July); Yoshio Araki (starting 7 July)
- Gifu Prefecture: Tetsushin Sudo (until 23 May); Miyoshi Shigeo (starting 23 May)
- Gunma Prefecture: Goro Murata
- Hiroshima Prefecture: Tokiji Yoshinaga (until 15 June); Saiichiro Miyamura (starting 15 June)
- Ibaraki Prefecture: Kanichi Naito (until 7 October); Tsujiyama (starting 7 October)
- Iwate Prefecture: Yoshifumi Yamauchi (until 15 June); Osamuzo Suzuki (starting 15 June)
- Kagawa Prefecture: Osamu Eianhyaku (until 9 January); Yoshiji Kosuga (starting 9 January)
- Kanagawa Prefecture: Mitsuma Matsumura (until month unknown)
- Kochi Prefecture: Naoaki Hattori (until 7 July); Satoru Okino (starting 7 July)
- Kumamoto Prefecture: Chioji Yukisawa (until 10 June); Hikari Akira (starting 10 June)
- Kyoto Prefecture: Ando Kyoushirou
- Mie Prefecture: Yoshiro Nakano (until 7 October); Koji Soga (starting 7 October)
- Miyagi Prefecture: Nobuo Hayashin (until 7 October); Otomaru Kato (starting 7 October)
- Miyazaki Prefecture: Osafume Katsumi
- Nagano Prefecture: Noburo Suzuki (until 9 January); Nagoya Osamu (starting 9 January)
- Niigata Prefecture: Doi Shohei
- Oita Prefecture: Ito Hisamatsu (starting 6 May)
- Okinawa Prefecture: Hajime Hayakawa
- Saga Prefecture: Yue Yue (until 23 May); Shogo Tanaka (starting 23 May)
- Saitama Prefecture: Miyano Shozo (until 9 January); Toshio Otsu (starting 9 January)
- Shiname Prefecture: Yasuo Otsubo (until 9 January); Goro Koizumi (starting 9 January)
- Tochigi Prefecture: Saburo Yamagata (until 9 January); Sakurai Yasuemon (starting 9 January)
- Tokyo: Jitsuzo Kawanishi (until 9 January); Matsumura Miro (starting 9 January)
- Toyama Prefecture: Kingo Machimura
- Yamagata Prefecture: Hee Yamauchi (until 7 July); Akira Saito (starting 7 July)

== Events ==
Below, events of World War II have the "WWII" preface

- 11 January – Japanese paratroopers land on Sulawesi.
- 12 January – Japan declares war on the Dutch.
- 22 January – Hideki Tōjō warns Australia that "if you continue resistance, we Japanese will destroy you."
- 4 February – Japan demands the surrender of Singapore.
- 17 February – Singapore is renamed Shōnan ("Light of the South").
- 20 March – The navy minister, Admiral Shigetarō Shimada says that in view of the Allies' "Retaliation and hatred", Japan would no longer follow recognized rules of sea warfare.
- 18 April – Doolittle Raid, the first bombing raid on the Japanese home islands
- 25 May – Four ships leave Hokkaido to stage a diversionary raid on the Aleutian Islands.
- 4–7 June – Battle of Midway
- 21 August – Battle of the Tenaru
- 11–12 October – Battle of Cape Esperance
- 12–15 November – Naval Battle of Guadalcanal

== Births ==
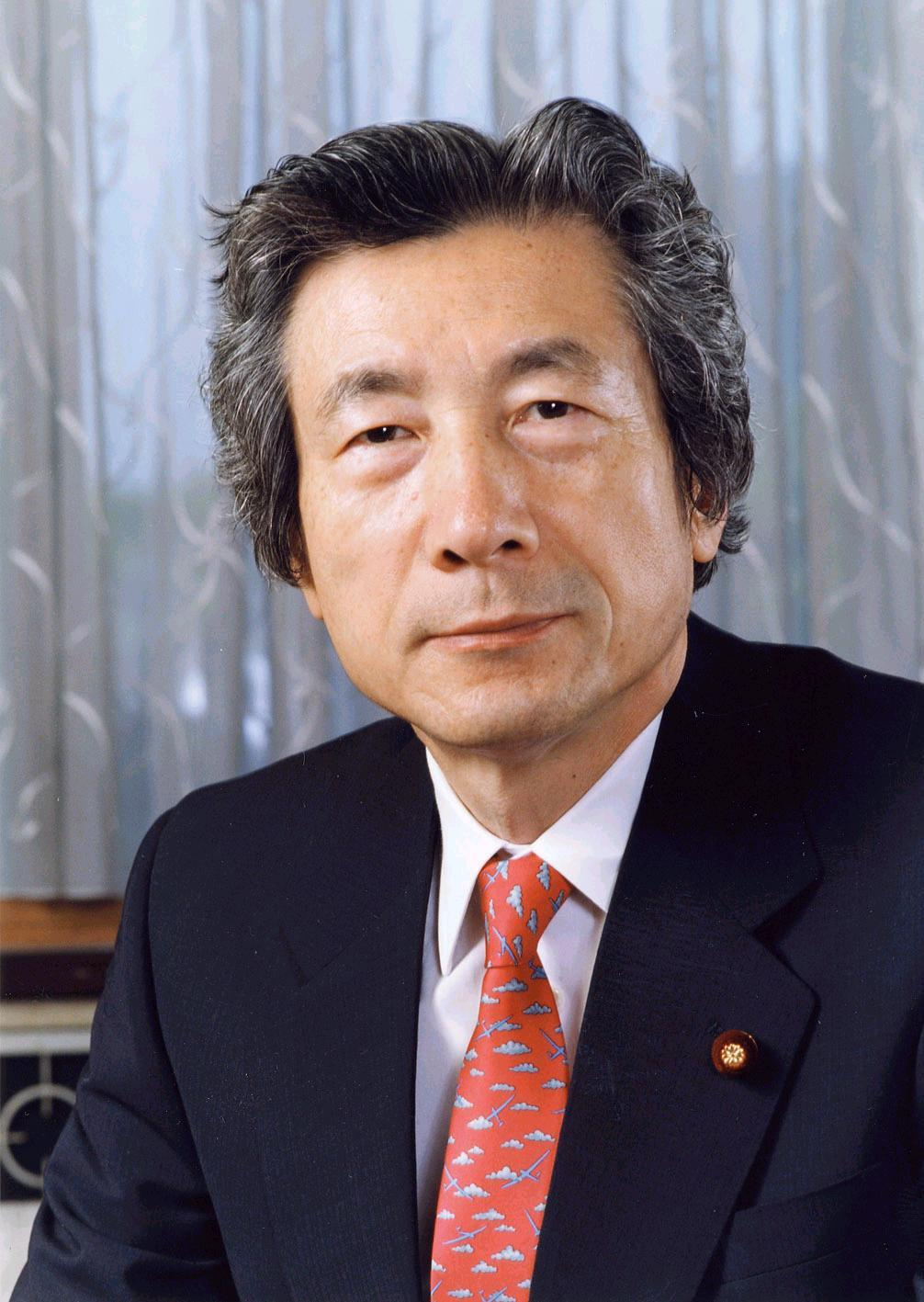
Junichiro Koizumi

- January 8 – Junichiro Koizumi, 56th Prime Minister of Japan
- January 27 – Tasuku Honjo, immunologist
- February 1 – Masa Saito, professional wrestler (d. 2018)
- March 17 – Yoko Yamamoto, actress (d. 2024)
- March 29 – Kenichi Ogata, actor
- April 2 – Hiroyuki Sakai, chef
- April 25 – Katsuji Adachi, professional wrestler (d. 2010)
- May 24 – Ichirō Ozawa, politician
- July 3 – Mitsuhiro Kitta, golfer
- July 5 – Motoaki Inukai, footballer
- July 22 – Toyohiro Akiyama, astronaut
- August 31 – Isao Aoki, golfer
- September 16 – Tadamasa Goto, yakuza boss
- September 19 – Nobuo Sekine, sculptor (d. 2019)

== Deaths ==
- May 11 – Sakutarō Hagiwara, writer, poet and critic (b. 1886)
- May 22 – Tateo Katō, fighter ace (b. 1903)
- May 29 – Akiko Yosano, author and poet (b. 1878)
- June 4
  - Jisaku Okada, Naval officer, killed in action at the Battle of Midway (b. 1897)
  - Tamon Yamaguchi, admiral (b. 1892)
- June 5 – Ryusaku Yanagimoto, captain (b. 1894)
- August 21 – Kiyonao Ichiki (b. 1892)
- August 26 – Junichi Sasai, aviator (b. 1918)
- September 5 – Toshinari Maeda, general (b. 1885)
- October 12 – Aritomo Gotō, admiral (b. 1888)
- October 21 – Toshio Ōta, aviator (b. 1919)
- October 26 – Yumio Nasu, major general (b. 1892)
- November 5 – Kiyoura Keigo, politician and Prime Minister of Japan (b. 1850)
- November 23 – Tomitarō Horii, lieutenant general (b. 1890)
- December 4 – Atsushi Nakajima, author (b. 1909)

== See also ==
- List of Japanese films of the 1940s
