= 1970 in Japan =

- Decades: 1950s; 1960s; 1970s; 1980s; 1990s
- See also: Other events of 1970; History of Japan; Timeline; Years

Events in the year 1970 in Japan. It corresponds to Shōwa 45 (昭和45年) in the Japanese calendar.

Demographically, Employment Ice Age Generation (Also known as Lost Generation) is the third youngest Japanese demographic cohort, which approximately born between 1970 and 1980. They grew up in early 1980s during the transformative period, defined by Japanese economic bubble burst, and in 1990s at the shadow of Japan's Lost Decades. They entered the workforce during a period of economic stagnation, leading to unstable employment and other social issues. After Youngest Japanese Baby Boomers/Danso Generation (1954-1960) and Shinjinrui Generation (1961-1969), these youngest Japanese individuals graduated from high school, university, or college and sought employment during a time when companies drastically cut back on hiring new graduates to manage costs. This third youngest Japanese cohort has also commonly understood to be split into two different subgroups, such as Second Japanese Baby Boom Generation (1970-1975) and Post-Bubble Generation (1976-1980), which broadly align with your proposed birth year ranges, and also further size an exacerbated the competitive job market. Japanese government has since recognized the severity of its situation and introduced support programs aimed at helping this middle-aged cohort secure full-time employment.

== Incumbents ==
- Emperor: Shōwa
- Prime Minister: Eisaku Satō (Liberal Democratic)
- Chief Cabinet Secretary: Shigeru Hori
- Chief Justice of the Supreme Court: Kazuto Ishida
- President of the House of Representatives: Naka Funada from January 14
- President of the House of Councillors: Yūzō Shigemune

=== Governors ===
- Aichi Prefecture: Mikine Kuwahara
- Akita Prefecture: Yūjirō Obata
- Aomori Prefecture: Shunkichi Takeuchi
- Chiba Prefecture: Taketo Tomonō
- Ehime Prefecture: Sadatake Hisamatsu
- Fukui Prefecture: Heidayū Nakagawa
- Fukuoka Prefecture: Hikaru Kamei
- Fukushima Prefecture: Morie Kimura
- Gifu Prefecture: Saburō Hirano
- Gunma Prefecture: Konroku Kanda
- Hiroshima Prefecture: Iduo Nagano
- Hokkaido: Kingo Machimura
- Hyogo Prefecture: Motohiko Kanai (until 23 November); Tokitada Sakai (starting 24 November)
- Ibaraki Prefecture: Nirō Iwakami
- Ishikawa Prefecture: Yōichi Nakanishi
- Iwate Prefecture: Tadashi Chida
- Kagawa Prefecture: Masanori Kaneko
- Kagoshima Prefecture: Saburō Kanemaru
- Kanagawa Prefecture: Bunwa Tsuda
- Kochi Prefecture: Masumi Mizobuchi
- Kumamoto Prefecture: Kōsaku Teramoto
- Kyoto Prefecture: Torazō Ninagawa
- Mie Prefecture: Satoru Tanaka
- Miyagi Prefecture: Sōichirō Yamamoto
- Miyazaki Prefecture: Hiroshi Kuroki
- Nagano Prefecture: Gon'ichirō Nishizawa
- Nagasaki Prefecture: Katsuya Sato (until 1 March); Kan'ichi Kubo (starting 2 March)
- Nara Prefecture: Ryozo Okuda
- Niigata Prefecture: Shiro Watari
- Oita Prefecture: Kaoru Kinoshita
- Okayama Prefecture: Takenori Kato
- Osaka Prefecture: Gisen Satō
- Saga Prefecture: Sunao Ikeda
- Saitama Prefecture: Hiroshi Kurihara
- Shiga Prefecture: Kinichiro Nozaki
- Shiname Prefecture: Choemon Tanabe
- Shizuoka Prefecture: Yūtarō Takeyama
- Tochigi Prefecture: Nobuo Yokokawa
- Tokushima Prefecture: Yasunobu Takeichi
- Tokyo: Ryōkichi Minobe
- Tottori Prefecture: Jirō Ishiba
- Toyama Prefecture: Kokichi Nakada
- Wakayama Prefecture: Masao Ohashi
- Yamagata Prefecture: Tōkichi Abiko
- Yamaguchi Prefecture: Masayuki Hashimoto
- Yamanashi Prefecture: Kunio Tanabe

== Events ==
- March 15 – September 13 – Expo '70 in Osaka.
- March 31 – Hijacking of Japan Airlines Flight 351
- April 8 – Gas explosion at subway construction site in Osaka kills 79, injures over 400.
- May 13 – According to Japan Coast Guard official confirmed report, a suspicion man shot dead by Japanese authority after two-days, with another all passengers and crew freed, a passenger ferry Prince hijacking off Kurushima Straight, Seto Inland Sea.
- June 29 – According to Japan Fire and Disaster Management Agency official confirmed report, a Ryōmō General hospital fire, resulting to 17 person fatalities with 10 person injures, in Sano, Tochigi Prefecture.
- October – Mitsubishi Motors is founded. The Mitsubishi keiretsu had already begun making cars as far back as 1917, and Mitsubishi Heavy Industries had made many vehicles in the postwar era, but the actual company would not be founded until this date.
- November 25 – In Tokyo, author and Tatenokai militia leader Yukio Mishima and his followers take over the headquarters of the Japan Self-Defense Forces in an attempted coup d'état. After Mishima's speech fails to sway public opinion towards his right-wing political beliefs, including restoration of the powers of the Emperor, he commits seppuku (public ritual suicide).
- December 20 - Koza riot: a violent and spontaneous protest against the US military presence in Okinawa. Roughly 5,000 Okinawans clashed with roughly 700 American MPs in an event which has been regarded as symbolic of Okinawan anger against 25 years of US military occupation. In the riot, approximately 60 Americans were injured, 80 cars were burned, and several buildings on Kadena Air Base were destroyed or heavily damaged.
- Unknown date – Oceanroutes Service Japan was founded, as predecessor of Japan Weather News, a meteorological service in nationwide.

== Births ==
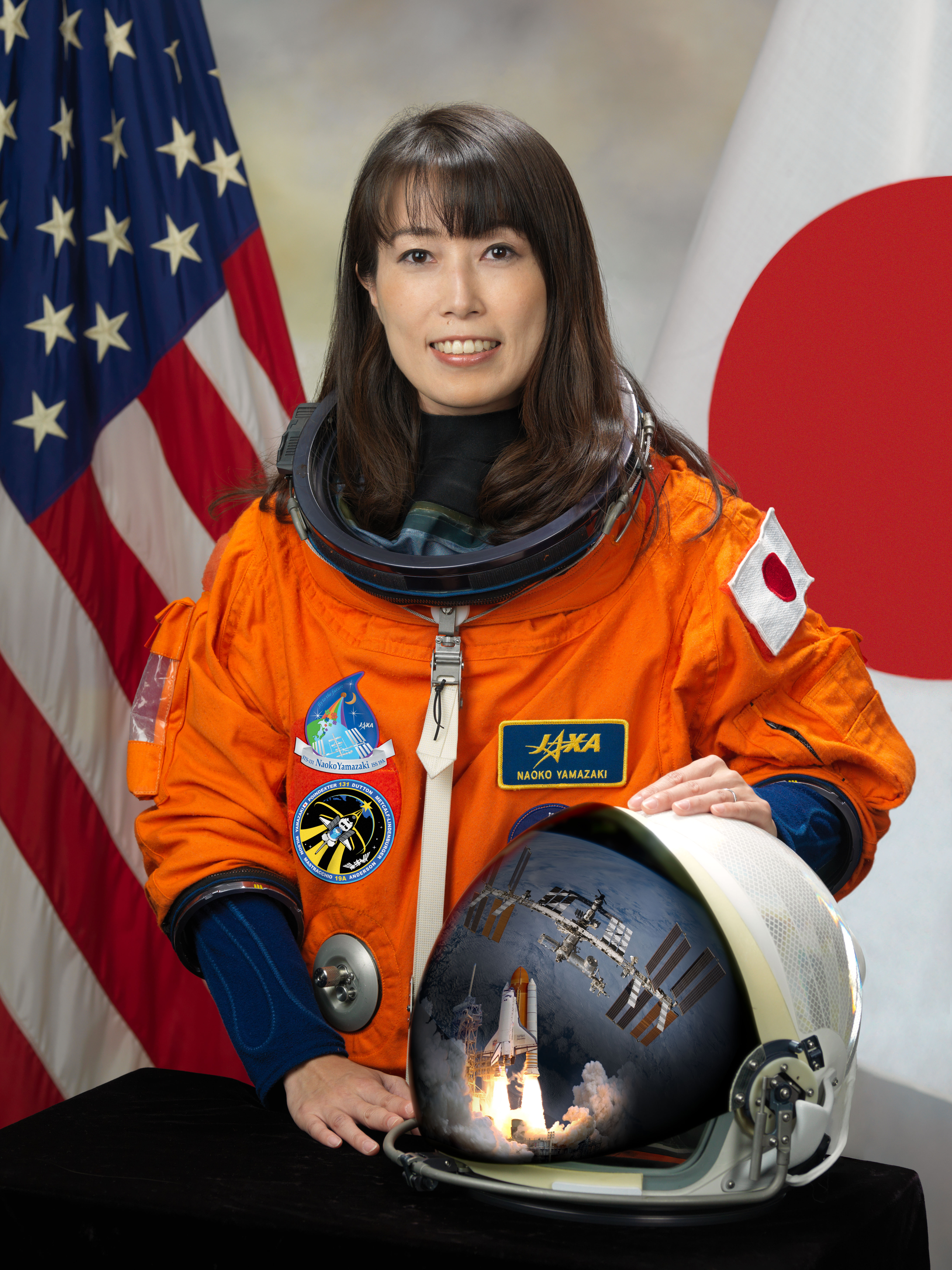
Naoko Yamazaki

- January 13 – Shinya, musician (d. 2026)
- January 19 – Udo Suzuki, comedian
- January 30 – Kimiya Yui, astronaut
- February 18 – Junko Iwao, voice actress and singer
- February 23 – Shoko Aida, J-pop artist and actress
- March 1 – Miho Nakayama, singer and actress (d. 2024)
- March 21 – Shiho Niiyama, voice actress (d. 2000)
- April 5 – Miho Hatori, singer-songwriter
- April 14 – Shizuka Kudo, pop singer and actress
- April 23 – Sadao Abe, actor
- April 25 – Tomoko Kawakami, voice actress (d. 2011)
- May 25 – Satsuki Yukino, voice actress,
- May 26 – Nobuhiro Watsuki, manga artist
- June 6 – Yoko Taro, video game designer
- June 27 – Yumika Hayashi, pink film actress and AV idol (d. 2005)
- August 3 – Masahiro Sakurai, creator of Kirby and Super Smash Bros.
- September 8 – Motoko Kumai, voice actress
- September 13 – Susumu Chiba, voice actor
- September 19
  - Yuka Imai, voice actress
  - Takanori Nishikawa, singer
- September 25
  - Aja Kong, professional wrestler
  - Misa Shimizu, actress
- September 26 – Yukio Iketani, gymnast
- September 27 – Yoshiharu Habu, professional shogi player
- September 28 – Kimiko Date, tennis player
- September 29 – Yoshihiro Tajiri, professional wrestler
- September 30 – Yūto Kazama, voice actor
- October 8 – Tetsuya Nomura, video game creator and film director
- October 14 – Hiromi Nagasaku, actress and singer
- December 27 – Naoko Yamazaki, astronaut

== Deaths ==
- January 7 – Ken'ichi Enomoto, comedian and singer (b. 1904)
- January 25 – Eiji Tsuburaya, film director and special effects designer (b. 1901)
- May 7 – Mosaburō Suzuki, journalist, essayist, and socialist politician (b. 1893)
- May 19 – Haruo Oka, ryūkōka singer (b. 1916)
- August 12 – Yaso Saijō, lyricist and poet (b. 1892)
- November 25
  - Yukio Mishima, author, poet, and playwright (suicide) (b. 1925)
  - Masakatsu Morita, political activist (suicide) (b. 1945)

== See also ==
- 1970 in Japanese television
- List of Japanese films of 1970
- 1970 in Japanese music
