= 1973 in Japan =

- Decades: 1950s; 1960s; 1970s; 1980s; 1990s
- See also: Other events of 1973; History of Japan • Timeline • Years

Events in the year 1973 in Japan. It corresponds to Shōwa 48 (昭和48年) in the Japanese calendar.

== Incumbents ==
- Emperor: Hirohito
- Prime minister: Kakuei Tanaka (Liberal Democratic)
- Chief Cabinet Secretary: Susumu Nikaido
- Chief Justice of the Supreme Court: Kazuto Ishida until May 19, Tomokazu Murakami from May 21
- President of the House of Representatives: Umekichi Nakamura until May 29, Shigesaburō Maeo
- President of the House of Councillors: Kenzō Kōno
- Diet sessions: 71st (extraordinary session opened on December 22, 1972, to September 27), 72nd (regular, December 1 to June 3, 1974)

=== Governors ===
- Aichi Prefecture: Mikine Kuwahara
- Akita Prefecture: Yūjirō Obata
- Aomori Prefecture: Shunkichi Takeuchi
- Chiba Prefecture: Taketo Tomonō
- Ehime Prefecture: Haruki Shiraishi
- Fukui Prefecture: Heidayū Nakagawa
- Fukuoka Prefecture: Hikaru Kamei
- Fukushima Prefecture: Morie Kimura
- Gifu Prefecture: Saburō Hirano
- Gunma Prefecture: Konroku Kanda
- Hiroshima Prefecture: Iduo Nagano (until 10 November); Hiroshi Miyazawa (starting 16 December)
- Hokkaido: Naohiro Dōgakinai
- Hyogo Prefecture: Tokitada Sakai
- Ibaraki Prefecture: Nirō Iwakami
- Ishikawa Prefecture: Yōichi Nakanishi
- Iwate Prefecture: Tadashi Chida
- Kagawa Prefecture: Masanori Kaneko
- Kagoshima Prefecture: Saburō Kanemaru
- Kanagawa Prefecture: Bunwa Tsuda
- Kochi Prefecture: Masumi Mizobuchi
- Kumamoto Prefecture: Issei Sawada
- Kyoto Prefecture: Torazō Ninagawa
- Mie Prefecture: Ryōzō Tagawa
- Miyagi Prefecture: Sōichirō Yamamoto
- Miyazaki Prefecture: Hiroshi Kuroki
- Nagano Prefecture: Gon'ichirō Nishizawa
- Nagasaki Prefecture: Kan'ichi Kubo
- Nara Prefecture: Ryozo Okuda
- Niigata Prefecture: Shiro Watari
- Oita Prefecture: Masaru Taki
- Okayama Prefecture: Shiro Nagano
- Okinawa Prefecture: Chōbyō Yara
- Osaka Prefecture: Ryōichi Kuroda
- Saga Prefecture: Sunao Ikeda
- Saitama Prefecture: Yawara Hata
- Shiga Prefecture: Kinichiro Nozaki
- Shiname Prefecture: Seiji Tsunematsu
- Shizuoka Prefecture: Yūtarō Takeyama
- Tochigi Prefecture: Nobuo Yokokawa
- Tokushima Prefecture: Yasunobu Takeichi
- Tokyo: Ryōkichi Minobe
- Tottori Prefecture: Jirō Ishiba (until 22 February); Kōzō Hirabayashi (starting 27 March)
- Toyama Prefecture: Kokichi Nakada
- Wakayama Prefecture: Masao Ohashi
- Yamagata Prefecture: Tōkichi Abiko (until 27 September); Seiichirō Itagaki (starting 17 October)
- Yamaguchi Prefecture: Masayuki Hashimoto
- Yamanashi Prefecture: Kunio Tanabe

== Events ==
- January 1 – Health care for those over 70 years of age is made free of charge
- March 8 – According to Japan Fire and Disaster Management Agency official confirmed report, Yawata General Hospital fire in Kitakyushu, Fukuoka Prefecture, total 13 patients were fatalities.
- March 19 – Konami is established.
- July 23 – Nidec was founded, as predecessor name was Nippon Densan (Electric Industry) Corporation.
- August 17 – Miyama Real Estate, as predecessor of Leopalace founded in Nakano, Tokyo.
- September 25 – According to Fire and Disaster Management Agency official confirmed report, a caught fire at under construction for department store in Takatsuki, Osaka Prefecture, kill six construction workers, in an incident caused bx a security guardman has arson acting.
- October 27 – A retailer CGC Group founded.
- November 29 – Fire breaks out in Taiyo department store in Kumamoto City, killing over a hundred.

== Births ==
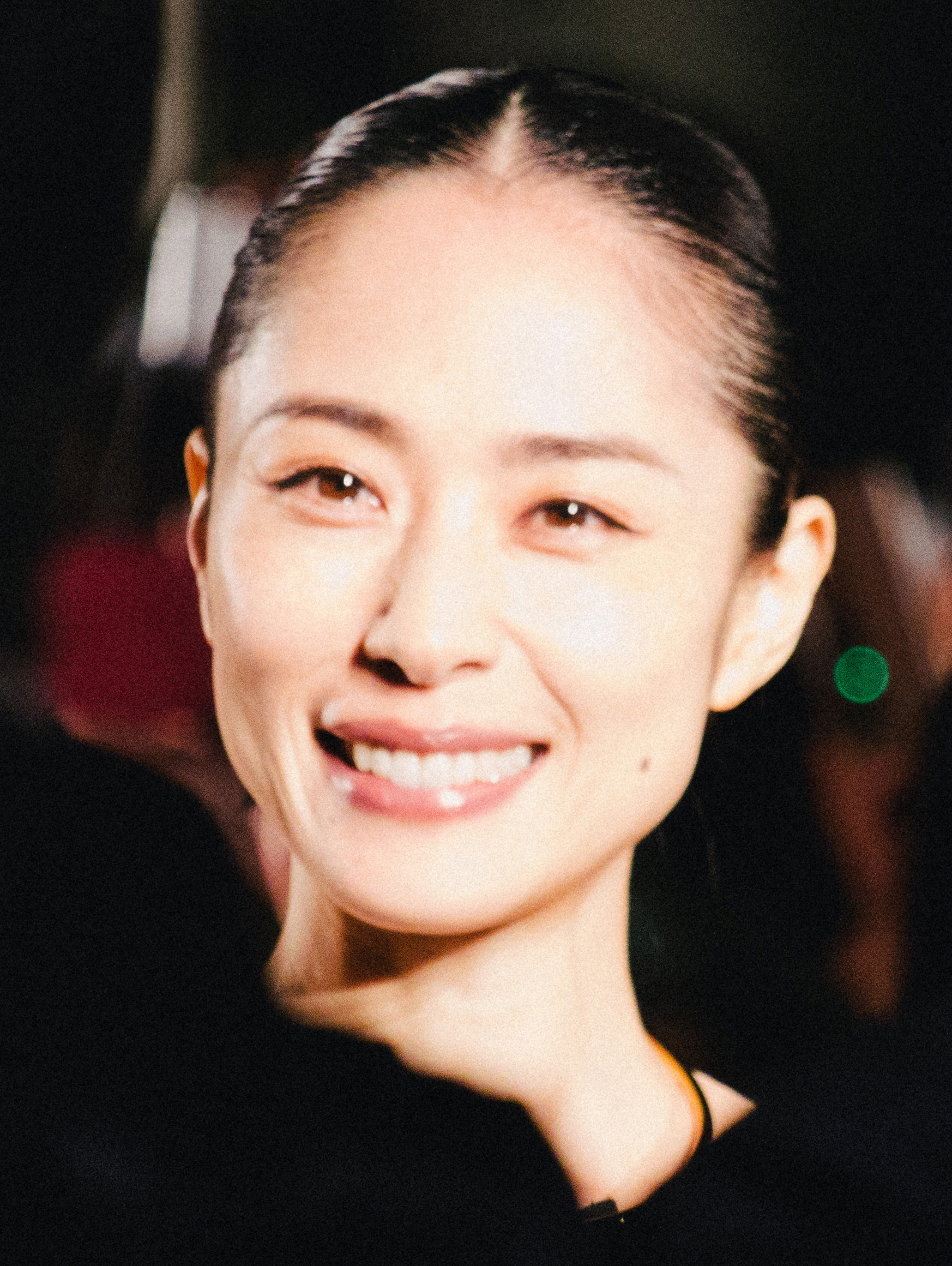
Eri Fukatsu

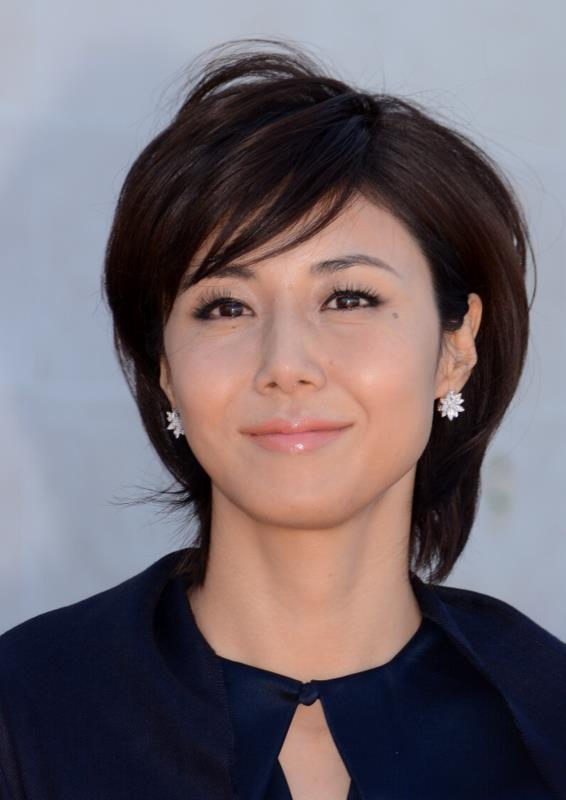
Nanako Matsushima

- January 2 – Michiyo Nakajima, actress, voice actress and former pop singer.
- January 11 – Eri Fukatsu, actress
- January 16 – Maki Miyamae, pop singer
- January 18 – Shinobu Nakayama, singer and former pop singer
- January 31 – Shingo Katayama, golfer
- February 1 – Makiko Ohmoto, voice actress
- February 7 – Mie Sonozaki, voice actress
- February 9 – Yoshitomo Tani, former professional baseball player
- February 11 – Haruhi Terada, voice actress
- February 28 – Masato Tanaka, professional wrestler
- March 6 – Rumi Ochiai, voice actress
- March 7 – Eiji Takemoto, voice actor
- March 24 – Sakura Tange, voice actress and singer
- March 27 – Sayaka Aoki, comedian
- April 6 – Rie Miyazawa, actress and singer
- April 21 – Katsuyuki Konishi, voice actor
- May 8 – Hiromu Arakawa, manga artist
- May 16 – Kōsuke Toriumi, voice actor
- May 18 – Kaz Hayashi, professional wrestler
- May 29 – Tomoko Kaneda, voice actress and J-pop singer
- June 12 – Mitsuki Saiga, voice actress
- June 18 – Yumi Kakazu, voice actress
- June 19 – Yuko Nakazawa, singer
- June 30 – Hidetada Yamagishi, bodybuilder
- July 2 – Makoto Kosaka, former professional baseball player
- July 4 – Gackt, singer-songwriter and actor
- July 7 – Natsuki Takaya, manga artist
- July 16 – Yoshihiko Hakamada, actor
- July 17
  - Takeshi Kaneshiro, Taiwanese/Japanese actor
  - Daimaou Kosaka, comedian
- August 13 – Ryōko Shinohara, actress
- August 31 – Kaori Mizumori, enka singer
- September 1 – Rieko Miura, actress and singer
- September 9 – Kazuhisa Ishii, baseball player
- September 18 – Ami Onuki, singer
- October 11 – Daisuke Sakaguchi, voice actor
- October 13 – Nanako Matsushima, actress and model
- October 14 – Masato Sakai, actor
- October 20 – Tomoka Shibasaki, writer
- October 22 – Ichiro Suzuki, baseball player
- October 26 – Taka Michinoku, professional wrestler
- November 6 – Rumi Shishido, voice actress and singer
- December 11 – Yūko Obuchi, politician and cabinet minister
- December 19 – Takashi Sorimachi, actor and singer
- December 25 – Daisuke Miura, professional baseball coach and former pitcher

== Deaths ==
- April 25 – Tanzan Ishibashi, journalist and politician (b. 1884)
- May 2 – Akiko Seki, soprano (b. 1899)
- September 15 – Saburō Matsukata, journalist, businessman and mountaineer (b. 1899)
- September 18 – Ken Harada, first Japanese diplomat to the Holy See (b. 1893)
- October 7 – Masayuki Mori, actor (b. 1911)
- November 7 – Kiyohide Shima, admiral (b. 1890)
- November 23 – Sesue Hayakawa, actor (b. 1886)

== See also ==
- 1973 in Japanese television
- List of Japanese films of 1973
- 1973 in Japanese music
