= 1896 in Japan =

- Decades: 1870s; 1880s; 1890s; 1900s; 1910s
- See also: Other events of 1896; History of Japan; Timeline; Years

Events in the year 1896 in Japan. It corresponds to Meiji 29 (明治29年) in the Japanese calendar.

== Incumbents ==
- Monarch: Emperor Meiji
- Prime Minister:
  - Itō Hirobumi (until August 31)
  - Kuroda Kiyotaka (acting) (August 31 – September 18)
  - Matsukata Masayoshi (from September 18)

=== Governors ===
- Aichi Prefecture: Tokito Konkyo
- Akita Prefecture: Yasuhiko Hirayama then Saburo Iwao
- Aomori Prefecture: Masa Sawa then Naomasa Maki
- Ehime Prefecture: Chang Masaya Komaki
- Fukui Prefecture: Kunizo Arakawa
- Fukushima Prefecture: Yasutaro Hara then Ogura Nobuchika then Akiyama
- Gifu Prefecture: Sukeo Kabayama
- Gunma Prefecture: Motootoko Nakamura then Abe Hiroshi then Masataka Ishizata
- Hiroshima Prefecture: Nabeshima Miki then Orita Heinai
- Ibaraki Prefecture: Egi Kazuyuki then Motohiro Onoda
- Iwate Prefecture: Ichizo Hattori
- Kagawa Prefecture: Ichizo Fukano then Tsunenori Tokuhisa
- Kochi Prefecture: Ishida Eikichi then Hiroshi Shikakui
- Kumamoto Prefecture: Matsudaira Masanao then Kanetake Oura
- Kyoto Prefecture: Baron Nobumichi Yamada
- Mie Prefecture: Terumi Tanabe
- Miyagi Prefecture: Terumi Tanabe
- Nagano Prefecture: Takasaki Chikaaki
- Niigata Prefecture: Baron Seung Zhi Kuwata
- Oita Prefecture: Tameharu Yamada then Yasuhiko Hirayama
- Okinawa Prefecture: Shigeru Narahara
- Osaka Prefecture: Utsumi Tadakatsu
- Saga Prefecture: Takeuchi
- Saitama Prefecture: Teru Tanabe then Tomi Senketaka
- Shiname Prefecture: Michio Sokabe
- Tochigi Prefecture: Egi Kazuyuki
- Tokyo: Miura Yasushi then Marquis Michitsune Koga
- Toyama Prefecture: Tokuhisa Tsunenori then Ando Kinsuke
- Yamagata Prefecture: Shuichi Kinoshita

== Events ==
- June 15 – Sanriku earthquake: One of the most destructive seismic events in Japanese history. The 8.5 magnitude earthquake occurred at 19:32 (local time), approximately 166 kilometres (103 mi) off the coast of Iwate Prefecture, Honshu. It resulted in two tsunamis which destroyed about 9,000 homes and caused at least 22,000 deaths. The waves reached a record height of 38.2 metres (125 ft); more than a meter lower than those created after the 2011 Tōhoku earthquake which triggered the Fukushima Daiichi nuclear disaster.
- December 28 – Nippon Flower Mills (Nipun) was founded.
- Unknown date – Penta-Ocean construction company founded
- Unknown date – Kotaro Mikamo reports the first results of a double-eyelid procedure for aesthetic purposes.

== Births ==
- January 1 – Hankyu Sasaki, admiral (d. 1971)
- April 22 – Chishō Takaoka, geisha, writer, and nun (d. 1994)
- May 11 – Toshiko, Princess Yasu, daughter of Emperor Meiji (d. 1978)
- July 28 – Takeru Inukai, politician and novelist (d. 1960)
- August 27 – Kenji Miyazawa, author and poet (d. 1933)
- November 13 – Nobusuke Kishi, politician and Prime Minister of Japan (d. 1987)

== Deaths ==
- February 28 – Tazawa Inabune, writer (b. 1874)
- November 23 – Ichiyō Higuchi, writer (b. 1872)
