= 1902 in Japan =

- Decades: 1880s; 1890s; 1900s; 1910s; 1920s
- See also: Other events of 1902; History of Japan; Timeline; Years

Events in the year 1902 in Japan. It corresponds to Meiji 35 (明治35年) in the Japanese calendar.

== Incumbents ==
- Emperor: Emperor Meiji
- Prime Minister: Katsura Tarō

=== Governors ===
- Aichi Prefecture: Baron Mori Momura
- Akita Prefecture: Takeda Chiyosaburo then Shiba Sankarasu
- Aomori Prefecture: Ichiji Yamanouchi
- Ehime Prefecture: Tai Neijro
- Fukui Prefecture: Munakata Tadashi then Suke Sakamoto
- Fukushima Prefecture: Arita Yoshisuke
- Gifu Prefecture: Kawaji Toshikyo
- Gunma Prefecture: Nobuchika Ogura
- Hiroshima Prefecture: Asada Tokunori
- Ibaraki Prefecture: Chuzo Kono
- Iwate Prefecture: Ganri Hojo
- Kagawa Prefecture: Naokata Suehiro then Motohiro Onoda
- Kochi Prefecture: Kinyuu Watanabe
- Kumamoto Prefecture: Tokuhisa Tsunenori then Egi Kazuyuki
- Kyoto Prefecture: Baron Shoichi Omori
- Mie Prefecture: Kamon Furusha
- Miyagi Prefecture: Motohiro Onoda then Tadashi Munakata then Terumi Tanabe
- Miyazaki Prefecture: Toda Tsunetaro
- Nagano Prefecture: Oshikawa Sokkichi then Seki Kiyohide
- Niigata Prefecture: Oshikawa Sokkichi then Hiroshi Abe
- Oita Prefecture: Marques Okubo Toshi Takeshi
- Okinawa Prefecture: Shigeru Narahara
- Osaka Prefecture: Tadashini Kikuchi
- Saga Prefecture: Seki Kiyohide then Fai Kagawa
- Saitama Prefecture: Marquis Okubo Toshi Takeshi
- Shiga Prefecture: Sada Suzuki
- Shiname Prefecture: Ihara Ko then Matsunaga Takeyoshi
- Tochigi Prefecture: Korechika then Sugai Makoto
- Tokushima Prefecture: Saburo Iwao
- Tokyo: Baron Sangay Takatomi
- Toyama Prefecture: Higaki Naosuke then Hisashi Ogura then Rika Ryusuke
- Yamagata Prefecture: Baron Seki Yoshiomi then Tanaka Takamichi
- Yamanashi Prefecture: Takeda Chiyosaburo

== Events ==
- January 23 – The Aomori Infantry, Eighth Division begin their snow march toward the Hakkōda Mountains. 199 soldiers die when a blizzard hits (known as the Snow March to Mt. Hakkoda).
- January 30 – The first Anglo-Japanese Alliance (日英同盟, Nichi-Ei Dōmei) was signed in London at Lansdowne House, on 30 January 1902, by Lord Lansdowne (British foreign secretary) and Hayashi Tadasu (Japanese minister in London). A diplomatic milestone that saw an end to Britain's splendid isolation, the alliance was renewed and expanded in scope twice, in 1905 and 1911, before its demise in 1921. It was officially terminated in 1923.
- May 1 – Daiwa Securities founded, as predecessor name was Fujimoto Bill Broker Banking in Kitaiama, Osaka.
- August 10 – Japanese general election: The result was a victory for the Rikken Seiyūkai party, which won 191 of the 376 seats. Voting remained restricted to men aged over 25 who paid at least 10 yen a year in direct taxation, although 1900 electoral reforms had reduced the figure from 15 yen, increasing the proportion of the population able to vote from 1% to 2%.
- September 15 – Dai-ichi Life was founded in Kyobashi region, Tokyo.

== Births ==
- January 25 – Shigeharu Nakano author and politician (d. 1979)
- January 26 – Prince Kachō Hirotada, army lieutenant (d. 1924)
- February 5 – Iwamoto Kaoru, professional Go player (d. 1999)
- February 17 – Nakamura Ganjirō II, film actor (d. 1983)
- April 11 – Hideo Kobayashi, author and writer (d. 1983)
- May 24 – Seishi Yokomizo, author (d. 1981)
- June 25 – Yasuhito, Prince Chichibu (d. 1953)
- September 28 – Kenzo Okada, painter (d. 1982)
- October 5 – Kimura Kume, film actor (d. 1989).
- October 12 – Hiromichi Yahara, Imperial Japanese Army officer (d. 1981)

== Deaths ==
- July 18 – Saigō Jūdō, politician (Genrō) and admiral (b. 1843)
- August 18 – Nishimura Shigeki, educator (b. 1828)
- September 8 – Nagayo Sensai, doctor, educator and statesman (b. 1838)
- September 19 – Masaoka Shiki, poet, author, and literary critic (b. 1867)
- December 12 – Sano Tsunetami, politician and founder of the Japanese Red Cross Society (b. 1822)
- December 24 – Takayama Chogyū, author and literary critic (b. 1871)
