= 1894 in Japan =

- Decades: 1870s; 1880s; 1890s; 1900s; 1910s
- See also: Other events of 1894; History of Japan; Timeline; Years

This is a list of events in the year 1894 in Japan. It corresponds to Meiji 27 (明治27年) in the Japanese calendar.

== Incumbents ==
- Emperor: Emperor Meiji
- Prime Minister: Itō Hirobumi

=== Governors ===
- Aichi Prefecture: Tokito Konkyo
- Akita Prefecture: Yasuhiko Hirayama
- Aomori Prefecture: Masa Sawa
- Ehime Prefecture: Katsumata Minoru then Chang Masaya Komaki
- Fukui Prefecture: Kunizo Arakawa
- Fukuoka Prefecture: Kojiro Iwasaki
- Fukushima Prefecture: Yoshio Kusaka
- Gifu Prefecture: Michio Sokabe
- Gunma Prefecture: Motootoko Nakamura
- Hiroshima Prefecture: Baron Nabeshima Miki
- Ibaraki Prefecture: Takasaki
- Iwate Prefecture: Ichizo Hattori
- Kagawa Prefecture: Baron Umashi Obata
- Kochi Prefecture: Ishida Eikichi
- Kumamoto Prefecture: Matsudaira Masanao
- Kyoto Prefecture: Hiroshi Nakai then Chiaki Watanabe
- Mie Prefecture: Shangyi Narukawa
- Miyagi Prefecture: Minoru Katsumata
- Nagano Prefecture: Asada Tokunor
- Niigata Prefecture: Baron Seung Zhi Kuwata
- Oita Prefecture: Tameharu Yamada
- Okinawa Prefecture: Shigeru Narahara
- Osaka Prefecture: Nobumichi Yamada
- Saga Prefecture: Takaya Nagamine then Teru Tanabe
- Saitama Prefecture: Tomi Senketaka
- Shimane Prefecture: Mamoru Funakoshi then Oura Kanetake
- Tochigi Prefecture: Orita Hirauchi then Sato Nobu
- Tokyo: Miura Yasushi
- Toyama Prefecture: Tokuhisa Tsunenori
- Yamagata Prefecture: Hasebe Ren then Shuichi Kinoshita

== Events ==
- July 25 – Battle of Pungdo
- July 28–29 – Battle of Seonghwan
- September 15 – Battle of Pyongyang
- September 17 – Battle of the Yalu River (1894)
- October 24 – Battle of Jiuliancheng
- November 21 – Battle of Lushunkou; Japanese forces storm all China's landward defences by noon the following day.

== Births ==
- January 1 – Shitsu Nakano, super-centenarian (d. 2007)
- April 9 – Keiji Shibazaki, rear admiral (d. 1943)
- April 15 – Kiichi Hasegawa, naval commander (d. 1944)
- April 18 – Kitsuju Ayabe, military commander (d. 1980)
- April 25 – Takeshi Mori, military commander (d. 1945)
- October 21 – Edogawa Ranpo, author and critic (d. 1965)
- November 27 – Konosuke Matsushita, founder of Matsushita Electric (d. 1989)
- date unknown – Masataka Taketsuru, founder of Japan's whisky industry (d. 1979)

== Deaths ==
- May 16 – Kitamura Tokoku, poet, essayist and writer (b. 1868)
- July 6 – Takahashi Yuichi, yōga painter (b. 1828)
