= Motoaki =

- Gender: Male

Origin
- Origin: Japanese
- Meaning: Different meanings depending on the kanji used

Motoaki (written: 基昭 or 基朗) is a masculine Japanese given name. Notable people with the name include:

- Motoaki Inukai (犬飼 基昭; born 1942), Japanese footballer
- Motoaki Takenouchi (武内 基朗; born 1967), Japanese composer
- Motoaki “Yagoo” Tanigo (谷御 元昭), founder and CEO of COVER Corporation, parent company of Hololive Production
