= 1943 in Japan =

- Decades: 1920s; 1930s; 1940s; 1950s; 1960s
- See also: Other events of 1943; History of Japan • Timeline • Years

Events in the year 1943 in Japan.

== Incumbents ==
- Emperor: Hirohito
- Prime Minister: Hideki Tōjō

=== Governors ===
- Aichi Prefecture: Yukisawa Chiyoji (until 1 July); Shinji Yoshino (starting 1 July)
- Akita Prefecture: Fumi (until 1 January); Katsumi Osafune (starting 1 July)
- Aomori Prefecture: Shunsuke Yamada (until 31 March); Utsunomiya Kohei (starting 31 March)
- Ehime Prefecture: Ryuichi Fukumoto (until 1 July); Aikawa Katsuroku (starting 1 July)
- Fukui Prefecture: Nagano Wakamatsu (until 16 July); Hatsuo Kato (starting 16 July)
- Fukushima Prefecture: Yoshio Araki (until 30 June); Koichi Kameyama (starting 1 July)
- Gifu Prefecture: Miyoshi Shigeo
- Gunma Prefecture: Goro Murata (until 22 April); Shinoyama Chiyuki (starting 22 April)
- Hiroshima Prefecture: Saiichiro Miyamura (until 1 July); Sukenari Yokoyama (starting 1 July)
- Ibaraki Prefecture: Tsujiyama (until 1 July); Sieve Yoshimi (starting 1 July)
- Iwate Prefecture: Osamuzo Suzuki
- Kagawa Prefecture: Yoshiji Kosuga
- Kochi Prefecture: Naoaki Hattori (until 1 July); Saburo Takahashi (starting 1 July)
- Kumamoto Prefecture: Hikari Akira
- Kyoto Prefecture: Ando Kyoushirou (until August); Chiyoji Yukizawa (starting August)
- Mie Prefecture: Yoshiro Nakano (until 1 July); Yoshio Mochinaga (starting 1 July)
- Miyagi Prefecture: Otomaru Kato (until 1 July); Nobuya Uchida (starting 1 July)
- Miyazaki Prefecture: Osafume Katsumi (until 1 July); Tadao Nishihiro (starting 1 July)
- Nagano Prefecture: Nagoya Osamu (until 10 January); Yoshio Koriyama (starting 10 January)
- Niigata Prefecture: Doi Shohei (until 1 February); Maeda Tamon (starting 1 February)
- Oita Prefecture: Ito Hisamatsu (until 1 May)
- Okinawa Prefecture: Hajime Hayakawa (until 1 July); Osamu Mori Izumi (starting 1 July)
- Saga Prefecture: Yue Yue
- Saitama Prefecture: Toshio Otsu (until 1 July); Sudo Tetsushin (starting 1 July)
- Shiname Prefecture: Goro Koizumi (until 10 October); Takeo Yamada (starting 10 October)
- Tochigi Prefecture: Soma Toshio
- Tokyo: Matsumura Miro (until 1 July); Shigeo Daitachi (starting 1 July)
- Toyama Prefecture: Kingo Machimura (until 23 April); Saka Shinya (starting 23 April)
- Yamagata Prefecture: Akira Saito

== Events ==
- January 14 – February 7 – Operation Ke
- January 29–30 – Battle of Rennell Island
- January 29–31 – Battle of Wau
- March 2–4 – Battle of the Bismarck Sea
- March 27 – Battle of the Komandorski Islands
- May 11–30 – Battle of Attu
- June 28 – July 1 – Battle of Viru Harbor
- June 30 – July 3 – Battle of Wickham Anchorage
- July 6 – Battle of Kula Gulf
- July 10–11 – Battle of Enogai
- July 12/13 – Battle of Kolombangara
- July 20 – Battle of Bairoko
- July 22 – August 4 – Battle of Munda Point
- August 6–7 – Battle of Vella Gulf
- August 17–18 – Battle off Horaniu
- September 10 – 1943 Tottori earthquake
- October 27 – November 12 – Battle of the Treasury Islands
- November 7–8 – Battle of Koromokina Lagoon
- November 18–25 – Battle of Piva Forks
- November 20–23 – Battle of Tarawa
- November 20–23 – Battle of Makin

== Films ==
- Sanshiro Sugata
- Momotarō no Umiwashi

== Births ==
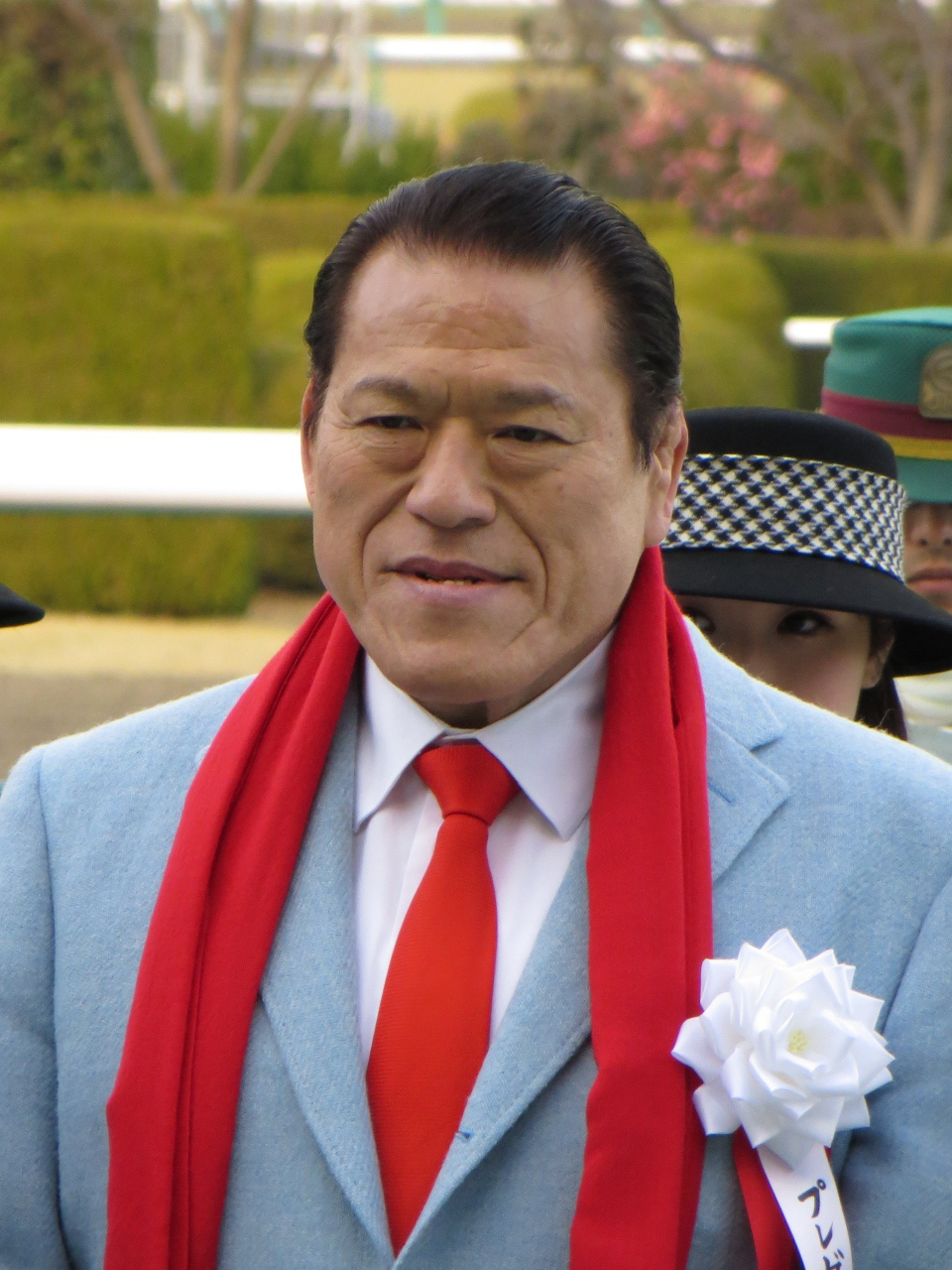
Antonio Inoki

- January 7 – Sadako Sasaki, hibakusha (d. 1955)
- January 15 – Kirin Kiki, actress (d. 2018)
- January 19 – Haruo Yasuda, golfer
- February 20 – Antonio Inoki, wrestler
- February 22 – Otoya Yamaguchi, assassin (d. 1960)
- April 3 – Hikaru Saeki, Japanese admiral, the first female star officer of the Japan Self-Defense Forces
- April 5 – Fighting Harada, boxer (real name Masahiko Harada)
- May 4 – Michiyo Azusa, singer and actress (real name Michiyo Hayashi) (d. 2020)
- June 20 – Masayuki Uemura, engineer and video game producer (d. 2021)
- August 17 – Yukio Kasaya, ski jumper
- September 16 – Tadamasa Goto, Japanese yakuza boss
- November 20 – Mie Hama, actress
- December 2 – Kiwako Taichi, actress (d. 1992)
- December 11 – Mariko Kaga, actress

== Deaths ==
- June 9- Mie Dong Long, film maker
- February 4 – Senjūrō Hayashi, Prime Minister of Japan (b. 1876)
- March 19
  - Tsugi Takano, poet (b. 1890)
  - Fujishima Takeji, painter (b. 1867)
- April 18 – Isoroku Yamamoto, admiral (b. 1884)
- May 29 – Yasuyo Yamasaki, army officer (b. 1891)
- June 11 – Heisuke Abe, general (b. 1886)
- July 6 – Teruo Akiyama, admiral (b. 1891)
- July 12/13 – Shunji Isaki, admiral (b. 1892)
- July 18 – Miyake Kaho, novelist, essayist and poet (b. 1868)
- August 21 – Hirohide Fushimi, lieutenant Commander (b. 1912)
- August 22 – Tōson Shimazaki, author (b. 1872)
- September 10 – Takeshi Sakurada, lieutenant general (b. 1891)
- October 16 – Yanagihara Naruko, lady-in-waiting and concubine (b. 1859)
- October 17 –Denji Kuroshima, author (b. 1898)
- November 20 – Keiji Shibazaki, rear admiral (b. 1894)
- November 26 – Kiyoto Kagawa, admiral (killed in action) (b. 1895)

== See also ==
- List of Japanese films of the 1940s
