= 1899 in Japan =

- Decades: 1870s; 1880s; 1890s; 1900s; 1910s
- See also: Other events of 1899; History of Japan • Timeline • Years

Events in the year 1899 in Japan. It corresponds to Meiji 32 (明治32年) in the Japanese calendar.

== Incumbents ==
- Emperor: Emperor Meiji
- Prime Minister: Yamagata Aritomo

=== Governors ===
- Aichi Prefecture: Mori Mamoru
- Akita Prefecture: Takeda Chiyosaburo
- Aomori Prefecture: Munakata Tadashi
- Ehime Prefecture: Tai Neijro
- Fukui Prefecture: Saburo Iwao
- Fukushima Prefecture: Kimumichi Nagusami then Arita Yoshisuke
- Gifu Prefecture: Tanaka Takamichi then Kawaji Toshikyo
- Gunma Prefecture: Suehiro Naokata
- Hiroshima Prefecture: Asada Tokunori
- Ibaraki Prefecture: Prince Kiyoshi Honba then Fumi Kashiwada
- Iwate Prefecture: Ganri Hojo
- Kagawa Prefecture: Yoshihara Saburo
- Kochi Prefecture: Tadashi Tanigawa
- Kumamoto Prefecture: Tokuhisa Tsunenori
- Kyoto Prefecture: Baron Utsumi Tadakatsu then Baron Shoichi Omori
- Mie Prefecture: Yuji Rika then Duke Isaburo Yamagata then Arakawa Yoshitaro
- Miyagi Prefecture: Motohiro Onoda
- Miyazaki Prefecture: Sukeo Kabawaya
- Nagano Prefecture: Oshikawa Sokkichi
- Niigata Prefecture: Minoru Katsumata
- Oita Prefecture: Marques Okubo Toshi Takeshi
- Okinawa Prefecture: Shigeru Narahara
- Osaka Prefecture: Tadashini Kikuchi
- Saga Prefecture: Seki Kiyohide
- Saitama Prefecture: Marquis Okubo Toshi Takeshi
- Shiname Prefecture: Matsunaga Takeyoshi
- Tochigi Prefecture: Korechika
- Tokyo: Baron Sangay Takatomi
- Toyama Prefecture: Kaneoryo Gen
- Yamagata Prefecture: Baron Seki Yoshiomi

== Events ==
- February 1 – Telephone service begins between Tokyo and Osaka.
- February 7 – Keiō and Waseda become Japan's first private universities.
- February 13 – The income tax law is promulgated.
- March 1 – Sankyo Pharmaceutical established in Yokohama, as predecessor of Daiichi Sankyo.
- March 4 – Japan passes its first copyright law.
- March 9 – Japan promulgates its commercial code, the Shōhō, to take effect on June 16.
- July 15 – Japan's first comprehensive copyright law takes effect and, on the same day, Japan agrees to join the Berne Convention.
- July 17 – NEC Corporation is organized as the first Japanese joint venture with foreign capital.
- November – Momijigari, the oldest extant Japanese film, is shot an open space behind the Kabuki-za in Tokyo.
- Unknown date – Morinaga Confectionery was founded, as predecessor name was Morinaga Western Confectionery.
- Unknown date – The Hokkaido Former Aborigines Protection Act is enacted by the Imperial Diet

== Births ==
- January 20 – Kenjiro Takayanagi, television engineer, creator of the world's first all-electronic television receiver (d. 1990)
- February 10 – Suihō Tagawa, manga artist (d. 1989)
- February 13 – Yuriko Miyamoto, novelist (d. 1951)
- March 7 – Jun Ishikawa, writer (d. 1987)
- June 11 – Yasunari Kawabata, writer, novelist, Nobel laureate in Literature (d. 1972)
- August 1 – Saburō Matsukata, journalist, businessman and mountaineer (d. 1973)
- August 5 – Sakae Tsuboi, novelist and poet (d. 1967)
- September 1 – Takuma Nishimura, general (d. 1951)
- September 8 – Akiko Seki, soprano (d. 1973)
- October 1 – Matsutarō Kawaguchi, novelist, playwright and film producer (d. 1985)
- November 7 – Daisuke Nanba, communist activist (d. 1924)
- December 3 – Hayato Ikeda, Prime Minister of Japan (d. 1965)
- Unknown – Genkei Masamune, botanist, (d. 1993)

== Deaths ==
- January 21 – Katsu Kaishū, statesman and naval engineer (b. 1823)
- May 11 – Kawakami Soroku. General (b. 1848)
- September 26 – Ōki Takatō, statesman, Mayor of Tokyo (b. 1832)
- December 26 – Harada Naojirō, yōga-style painter (b. 1863)
