= 1967 in Japan =

- Decades: 1940s; 1950s; 1960s; 1970s; 1980s
- See also: Other events of 1967; History of Japan • Timeline • Years

Events from the year 1967 in Japan.

== Incumbents ==
- Emperor: Hirohito
- Prime Minister: Eisaku Satō (Liberal Democratic)
- Chief Cabinet Secretary: Kenji Fukunaga until June 22, Toshio Kimura
- Chief Justice of the Supreme Court: Masatoshi Yokota
- President of the House of Representatives: Mitsujirō Ishii from February 15
- President of the House of Councillors: Yūzō Shigemune

=== Governors ===
- Aichi Prefecture: Mikine Kuwahara
- Akita Prefecture: Yūjirō Obata
- Aomori Prefecture: Shunkichi Takeuchi
- Chiba Prefecture: Taketo Tomonō
- Ehime Prefecture: Sadatake Hisamatsu
- Fukui Prefecture: Eizō Kita (until 22 April); Heidayū Nakagawa (starting 23 April)
- Fukuoka Prefecture: Taichi Uzaki (until 22 April); Hikaru Kamei (starting 23 April)
- Fukushima Prefecture: Morie Kimura
- Gifu Prefecture: Saburō Hirano
- Gunma Prefecture: Konroku Kanda
- Hiroshima Prefecture: Iduo Nagano
- Hokkaido: Kingo Machimura
- Hyogo Prefecture: Motohiko Kanai
- Ibaraki Prefecture: Nirō Iwakami
- Ishikawa Prefecture: Yōichi Nakanishi
- Iwate Prefecture: Tadashi Chida
- Kagawa Prefecture: Masanori Kaneko
- Kagoshima Prefecture: Katsushi Terazono (until 29 April); Saburō Kanemaru (starting 30 April)
- Kanagawa Prefecture: Iwataro Uchiyama (until 22 April); Bunwa Tsuda (starting 23 April)
- Kochi Prefecture: Masumi Mizobuchi
- Kumamoto Prefecture: Kōsaku Teramoto
- Kyoto Prefecture: Torazō Ninagawa
- Mie Prefecture: Satoru Tanaka
- Miyagi Prefecture: Shintaro Takahashi
- Miyazaki Prefecture: Hiroshi Kuroki
- Nagano Prefecture: Gon'ichirō Nishizawa
- Nagasaki Prefecture: Katsuya Sato
- Nara Prefecture: Ryozo Okuda
- Niigata Prefecture: Shiro Watari
- Oita Prefecture: Kaoru Kinoshita
- Okayama Prefecture: Takenori Kato
- Osaka Prefecture: Gisen Satō
- Saga Prefecture: Sunao Ikeda
- Saitama Prefecture: Hiroshi Kurihara
- Shiga Prefecture: Kinichiro Nozaki
- Shiname Prefecture: Choemon Tanabe
- Shizuoka Prefecture: Toshio Saitō (until 7 January); Yūtarō Takeyama (starting 1 February)
- Tochigi Prefecture: Nobuo Yokokawa
- Tokushima Prefecture: Yasunobu Takeichi
- Tokyo: Ryōtarō Azuma (until 22 April) Ryōkichi Minobe (starting 23 April)
- Tottori Prefecture: Jirō Ishiba
- Toyama Prefecture: Minoru Yoshida
- Wakayama Prefecture: Shinji Ono (until 22 April); Masao Ohashi (starting 23 April)
- Yamagata Prefecture: Tōkichi Abiko
- Yamaguchi Prefecture: Masayuki Hashimoto
- Yamanashi Prefecture: Hisashi Amano (until 16 February); Kunio Tanabe (starting 17 February)

== Events ==
- January 29 – General election of 1967 – Liberal Democratic Party win 277 out of 486 seats.
- February 1 – Higashiosaka city start by three cities, Fuse (布施), Kawachi (河内) and Hiraoka (枚岡) mergered in Osaka Prefecture.
- March 1 – City of Hatogaya, Saitama founded.
- March 1 – Hankyū Senri Line, Osaka, Japan, opens.
- March 24 – Tanimachi Line, Osaka, Japan, opens.
- June 18 – A home-made bomb explodes on a Hyōgo-Himeji local commuter train at Shioya Station on the Sanyo Electric Railway Main Line, Kobe, Hyōgo, Japan. No one claims responsibility in this case, which kills two persons with 29 wounded.
- July 10 – Heavy rain and landslides hit Kobe and Kure, kill at least 371.
- August 29 – A heavy torrential rain and mudslide occur in Murakami, Shibata and Oguni area, part of Niigata Prefecture and Yamagata Prefecture, according to Fire and Disaster Management Agency of Japan confirmed report, 142 person lost to lives.
- December unknown – Nitori Furniture Wholesale Center, as predecessor of furniture retailer Nitori was established in Kita-ku, Sapporo, Hokkaido.
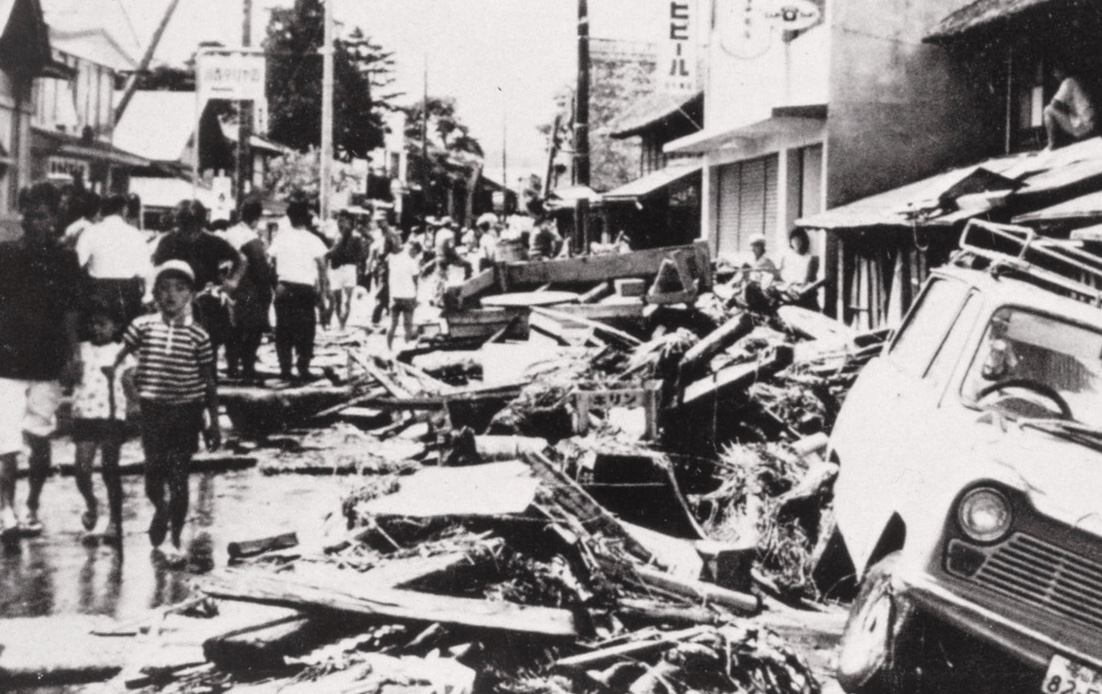
A damage, aftermath in Kawanishi Town, Yamagata Prefecture in 1967 Uetsu flood on August

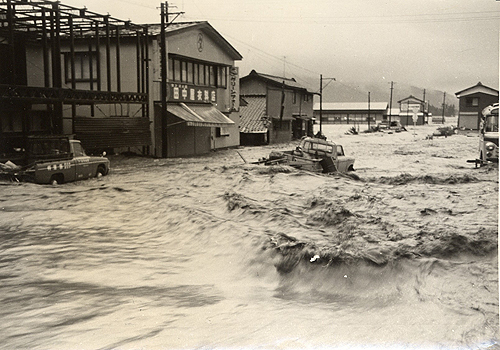
A flash flood hit in Sekikawa village, Niigata Prefecture,1967 Uetsu flood on August

== Births ==
- January 19 – Nekojiru, manga artist (d. 1998)
- January 25 – Nozomu Sasaki, voice actor
- January 26 – Toshiyuki Morikawa, voice actor
- February 6 – Izumi Sakai, singer (Zard) (d. 2007)
- February 26 – Kazuyoshi Miura, footballer
- March 14 – Yūta Mochizuki, actor of 1992 Super Sentai Kyoryu Sentai Zyuranger as Tyranno Ranger/Geki
- March 15 – Naoko Takeuchi, artist
- March 27 – Kenta Kobashi, professional wrestler
- March 30 – Megumi Hayashibara, voice actress
- April 1 – Tomonobu Itagaki, video game designer (d. 2025)
- April 22 – Mio Sugita, politician
- May 4 – Akiko Yajima, voice actress
- May 5 – Takehito Koyasu, voice actor
- May 6 – Kenta Satou, actor of 1989 Super Sentai of First Heisei Series Kousoku Sentai Turboranger as Red Turbo/Riki Honoo as OP and ED Himself Performing.
- May 10 – Nobuhiro Takeda, footballer and sportscaster
- June 15 – Yūji Ueda, voice actor
- June 23 – Yoko Minamino, idol, singer and actress
- June 26 – Kaori Asoh, voice actress and singer
- July 13 – Akira Hokuto, women's professional wrestler
- July 28 – Taka Hirose, musician (Feeder)
- July 31 – Minako Honda, singer and musical actress (d. 2005)
- August 8 – Yūki Amami, actress
- August 15 – Takashi Tachibana, politician
- August 22 – Yukiko Okada, singer, actress, model (d. 1986)
- August 28 – Masaaki Endoh, singer
- September 5 – Koichi Morishita, long-distance runner
- September 23 – Masashi Nakayama, footballer
- October 19 – Yoko Shimomura, composer
- November 2 – Akira Ishida, voice actor
- November 28 – Renhō, politician and journalist
- December 8 – Kotono Mitsuishi, voice actress
- December 13 – Yūji Oda, singer and actor
- December 15 – Ami Kawai, actress
- December 31 – Yosuke Eguchi, actor and singer

== Deaths ==
- June 23 – Sakae Tsuboi, novelist and poet (b. 1899)
- July 5 – Shimizugawa Motokichi, sumo wrestler (b. 1900)
- July 13 – Hideo Yoshino, Tanka poet (b. 1902)
- August 22 – Sanzo Wada, painter and costume designer, winner of 1954 Academy Award for Costume Design for Gate of Hell (b. 1883)
- October 20 – Shigeru Yoshida, Prime Minister of Japan (b. 1878)

== See also ==
- 1967 in Japanese television
- List of Japanese films of 1967
- 1967 in Japanese music
