= 1900 in Japan =

- Decades: 1880s; 1890s; 1900s; 1910s; 1920s
- See also: Other events of 1900; History of Japan; Timeline; Years

Events in the year 1900 in Japan. It corresponds to Meiji 33 (明治33年) in the Japanese calendar.

== Incumbents ==
- Emperor: Emperor Meiji
- Prime Minister:
  - Yamagata Aritomo: (until October 19)
  - Itō Hirobumi: (starting October 19)

=== Governors ===
- Aichi Prefecture: Mori Mamoru
- Akita Prefecture: Takeda Chiyosaburo
- Aomori Prefecture: Munakata Tadashi
- Ehime Prefecture: Tai Neijro
- Fukui Prefecture: Saburo Iwao then Munakata Tadashi
- Fukushima Prefecture: Arita Yoshisuke
- Gifu Prefecture: Kawaji Toshikyo
- Gunma Prefecture: Furusho Kamon then Nobuchika Ogura
- Hiroshima Prefecture: Asada Tokunori
- Ibaraki Prefecture: Fumi Kashiwada then Chuzo Kono
- Iwate Prefecture: Ganri Hojo
- Kagawa Prefecture: Yoshihara Saburo then Yoshitaro Arakawa then Naokata Suehiro
- Kochi Prefecture: Tadashi Tanigawa then Kinyuu Watanabe
- Kumamoto Prefecture: Tokuhisa Tsunenori
- Kyoto Prefecture: Baron Shoichi Omori
- Mie Prefecture: Kamon Furusha
- Miyagi Prefecture: Kiyoshi Shin then Chikaaki Takasaki then Nomura Masaaki then Motohiro Onoda
- Miyazaki Prefecture: Sukeo Kabawaya then Isamu Sonowaya
- Nagano Prefecture: Oshikawa Sokkichi
- Niigata Prefecture: Minoru Katsumata
- Oita Prefecture: Marques Okubo Toshi Takeshi then Sada Suzuki
- Okinawa Prefecture: Shigeru Narahara
- Osaka Prefecture: Tadashini Kikuchi
- Saga Prefecture: Seki Kiyohide
- Saitama Prefecture: Marquis Okubo Toshi Takeshi
- Shiname Prefecture: Matsunaga Takeyoshi
- Tochigi Prefecture: Hagino Samon then Korechika
- Tokyo: Baron Sangay Takatomi
- Toyama Prefecture: Kaneoryo Gen
- Yamagata Prefecture: Baron Seki Yoshiomi

== Events ==
- May 10 – Prince Yoshihito, the future Emperor Taishō, marries Sadako Kujō.
- June 5 – Kyoto Hosei School, as predecessor of Ritsumeikan University has founded.

== Births ==
- January 1 – Chiune Sugihara, diplomat (d. 1986)
- January 2 – Mansaku Itami, film director (d. 1946)
- January 13 – Shimizugawa Motokichi, sumo wrestler (d. 1967)
- January 16 – Kiku Amino, author and translator (d. 1978)
- February 11 – Jōsei Toda, educator and peace activist (d. 1958)
- February 27 – Keiji Nishitani, philosopher (d. 1990)
- March 15 – Kenji Tomiki, aikido and judo teacher (d. 1979)
- June 1 – Noburō Ōfuji, film director and animator (d. 1961)
- July 4 – Ukichiro Nakaya, physicist (d. 1962)
- July 5 – Yoshimaro Yamashina, ornithologist (d. 1989)
- July 16 – Mumon Yamada, Rinzai religious leader (d. 1988)
- July 23 – Prince Kaya Tsunenori (d. 1978)
- August 4 – Nabi Tajima, supercentenarian (d. 2018)
- August 23 – Tatsuji Miyoshi, poet, literary critic, and editor (d. 1964)
- December 24 – Hawayo Takata, teacher and master practitioner of Reiki (d. 1980)

== Deaths ==
- February 26 – Shinagawa Yajirō, politician (b. 1843)
- August 23 – Kuroda Kiyotaka, second Prime Minister of Japan (b. 1840)
