= 1903 in Japan =

- Decades: 1880s; 1890s; 1900s; 1910s; 1920s
- See also: Other events of 1903; History of Japan • Timeline • Years

Events in the year 1903 in Japan. It corresponds to Meiji 36 (明治36年) in the Japanese calendar.

== Incumbents ==
- Emperor: Emperor Meiji

=== Governors ===
- Aichi Prefecture: Masaaki Nomura
- Akita Prefecture: Shiba Sankarasu then Ichiro Tsubaki
- Aomori Prefecture: Ichiji Yamanouchi then Katsutaro Inuzuka then Shotaro Nishizawa
- Ehime Prefecture: Tai Neijro
- Fukui Prefecture: Suke Sakamoto
- Fukushima Prefecture: Arita Yoshisuke
- Gifu Prefecture: Kawaji Toshikyo
- Gunma Prefecture: Yoshimi Teru
- Hiroshima Prefecture: Asada Tokunori then Tokuhisa Tsunenori
- Ibaraki Prefecture: Chuzo Kono then Teru Terahara
- Iwate Prefecture: Ganri Hojo
- Kagawa Prefecture: Motohiro Onoda
- Kochi Prefecture: Kinyuu Watanabe then Munakata Tadashi
- Kumamoto Prefecture: Egi Kazuyuki
- Kyoto Prefecture: Baron Shoichi Omori
- Mie Prefecture: Kamon Furusha
- Miyagi Prefecture: Terumi Tanabe
- Miyazaki Prefecture: Toda Tsunetaro
- Nagano Prefecture: Seki Kiyohide
- Niigata Prefecture: Hiroshi Abe
- Oita Prefecture: Marques Okubo Toshi Takeshi
- Okinawa Prefecture: Shigeru Narahara
- Saga Prefecture: Fai Kagawa
- Saitama Prefecture: Marquis Okubo Toshi Takeshi
- Shiga Prefecture: Sada Suzuki
- Shiname Prefecture: Ryogen Kaneo then Matsunaga Takeyoshi
- Tochigi Prefecture: Sugai Makoto
- Tokushima Prefecture: Saburo Iwao
- Tokyo: Baron Sangay Takatomi
- Toyama Prefecture: Rika Ryusuke
- Yamagata Prefecture: Tanaka Takamichi
- Yamanashi Prefecture: Takeda Chiyosaburo

== Events ==
- March 1 – 1903 Japanese general election: The Rikken Seiyūkai party remained the largest in the House of Representatives, winning 175 of the 376 seats, but lost its majority.
- July 7 – Momijigari, the oldest extant Japanese film, premiers. It runs until August 1.
- Unknown date – Kagome was founded, as predecessor name was Aichi Tomato Food Processing in Tokai, Aichi Prefecture.

== Births ==
- January 2 – Kane Tanaka, supercentenarian (oldest verified Japanese person and the second oldest verified person ever) (d. 2022)
- January 7 – Mori Mari, author (d. 1987)
- January 25 – Fumiko Kaneko, anarchist (d. 1926) (Note: The exact dates of Kaneko's life are uncertain. The official record lists her birthday as January 25, 1902, but this record was created years after her birth, and is therefore unreliable. Her date of birth listed here is based on coinciding statements made by both of her parents.)
- February 3 – Yasutarō Yagi, screenwriter (d. 1987)
- February 5 – Koto Matsudaira, diplomat (d. 1994)
- February 18 – Tokihiko Okada, silent film actor (d. 1934)
- March 6 – Empress Kōjun, empress consort of Emperor Hirohito (d. 2000)
- March 30 – Chiezō Kataoka, actor (d. 1983)
- April 11 – Misuzu Kaneko, poet (d. 1930)
- May 19 – Shimoe Akiyama, Japanese supercentenarian (d. 2019)
- June 8 – Yukie Chiri, Ainu transcriber and translator (d. 1922)
- June 22 – Jiro Horikoshi, aircraft designer and engineer (d. 1982)
- August 3 – Roppa Furukawa, film actor (d. 1961)
- September 7 – Kensaku Shimaki, writer (d. 1945)
- September 28 – Tateo Katō, fighter ace (d. 1942)
- October 1 – Yoshiyuki Tsuruta, Olympic swimmer (d. 1986)
- October 13 – Takiji Kobayashi, writer (d. 1933)
- November 3 – Shizue Shiono, film actor (d. 1962)
- December 12 – Yasujirō Ozu, film director and screenwriter (d. 1963)
- December 31 – Fumiko Hayashi, writer (d. 1951)

== Deaths ==
- February 18
  - Prince Komatsu Akihito, Field Marshal, Chief of the General Staff (b. 1846)
  - Onoe Kikugorō V, kabuki actor (b. 1844)
- April 28 – Saigō Tanomo, Shinto priest, martial artist and former Samurai (b. 1830)
- May 22 – Misao Fujimura, student and poet (b. 1886)
- June 29 – Rentarō Taki, pianist (b. 1879)
- August 27 – Kusumoto Ine, physician, first female doctor of Western medicine in Japan (b. 1827)
- September 13 – Ichikawa Danjūrō IX, kabuki actor (b. 1838)
- October 30 – Ozaki Kōyō, author (b. 1868)
