= 1979 in Japanese television =

Events in 1979 in Japanese television.

== Debuts ==
- Anne of Green Gables, anime (1979)
- Doraemon, anime (1979 - 2005)
- Battle Fever J, tokusatsu (1979–1980)
- Kamen Rider (Skyrider), tokusatsu (1979–1980)
- Kinpachi-sensei (1st series), drama (1979–1980)
- Megaloman, tokusatsu (1979)
- Mobile Suit Gundam, anime (1979-1980)
- Supergirl, crime drama (1979–1980)
- The Ultraman, anime (1979–1980)
- The Rose of Versailles, anime (1979-1980)

== Ongoing shows ==
- Music Fair, music (1964–present)
- Mito Kōmon, jidaigeki (1969–2011)
- Sazae-san, anime (1969–present)
- Ōedo Sōsamō, anime (1970–1984)
- Ōoka Echizen, jidaigeki (1970–1999)
- Star Tanjō!, talent (1971–1983)
- FNS Music Festival, music (1974–present)
- Ikkyū-san, anime (1975–1982)
- Panel Quiz Attack 25, game show (1975–present)

== Endings ==
- Candy Candy, anime (1976–1979)
- Megaloman, tokusatsu (1979)
- Spider-Man, tokusatsu (1978–1979)
- The New Aim for the Ace!, anime (1978–1979)
- The Yagyu Conspiracy, drama (1978–1979)
- Spider-Man, tokusatsu (1978-1979)
- Yatterman, anime (1977–1979)
- Rose of Versailles, anime (1979-1980)

== See also ==
- 1979 in anime
- 1979 in Japan
- List of Japanese films of 1979
