= 1901 in Japan =

- Decades: 1880s; 1890s; 1900s; 1910s; 1920s
- See also: Other events of 1901; History of Japan • Timeline • Years

Events in the year 1901 in Japan. It corresponds to Meiji 34 (明治34年) in the Japanese calendar.

== Incumbents ==
- Emperor: Emperor Meiji
- Prime Minister:
  - Itō Hirobumi: until May 10
  - Saionji Kinmochi: (Acting) May 10 – June 2
  - Katsura Tarō: from June 2

=== Governors ===
- Aichi Prefecture: Mori Mamoru
- Akita Prefecture: Takeda Chiyosaburo
- Aomori Prefecture: Munakata Tadashi then Ichiji Yamanouchi
- Ehime Prefecture: Tai Neijro
- Fukui Prefecture: Saburo Iwao then Munakata Tadashi
- Fukushima Prefecture: Arita Yoshisuke
- Gifu Prefecture: Kawaji Toshikyo
- Gunma Prefecture: Furusho Kamon then Nobuchika Ogura
- Hiroshima Prefecture: Asada Tokunori
- Ibaraki Prefecture: Chuzo Kono
- Iwate Prefecture: Ganri Hojo
- Kagawa Prefecture: Naokata Suehiro
- Kochi Prefecture: Kinyuu Watanabe
- Kumamoto Prefecture: Tokuhisa Tsunenori then Egi Kazuyuki
- Kyoto Prefecture: Baron Shoichi Omori
- Mie Prefecture: Kamon Furusha
- Miyagi Prefecture: Motohiro Onoda then Tadashi Munakata
- Miyazaki Prefecture: Sukeo Kabawaya then Isamu Sonowaya
- Nagano Prefecture: Oshikawa Sokkichi then Seki Kiyohide
- Niigata Prefecture: Oshikawa Sokkichi
- Oita Prefecture: Marques Okubo Toshi Takeshi
- Okinawa Prefecture: Shigeru Narahara
- Osaka Prefecture: Tadashini Kikuchi
- Saga Prefecture: Seki Kiyohide then Fai Kagawa
- Saitama Prefecture: Marquis Okubo Toshi Takeshi
- Shiga Prefecture: Sada Suzuki
- Shiname Prefecture: Matsunaga Takeyoshi
- Tochigi Prefecture: Korechika
- Tokushima Prefecture: Saburo Iwao
- Tokyo: Baron Sangay Takatomi
- Toyama Prefecture: Higaki Naosuke
- Yamagata Prefecture: Baron Seki Yoshiomi

== Events ==
- February 5 – Japan fires up the furnace at its first modern ironworks.
- April 20 – Japan Women's University is established.
- June 2 – Katsura Tarō becomes Prime Minister of Japan.
- September 7 – The Boxer Protocol is signed between the Qing Empire of China and the Eight-Nation Alliance. Japan is represented by the Minister for Foreign Affairs Komura Jutarō.
- Unknown date – Imabari Shipbuilding was founded, as predecessor name was Higaki Shipbuilding in Ehime Prefecture.

== Births ==
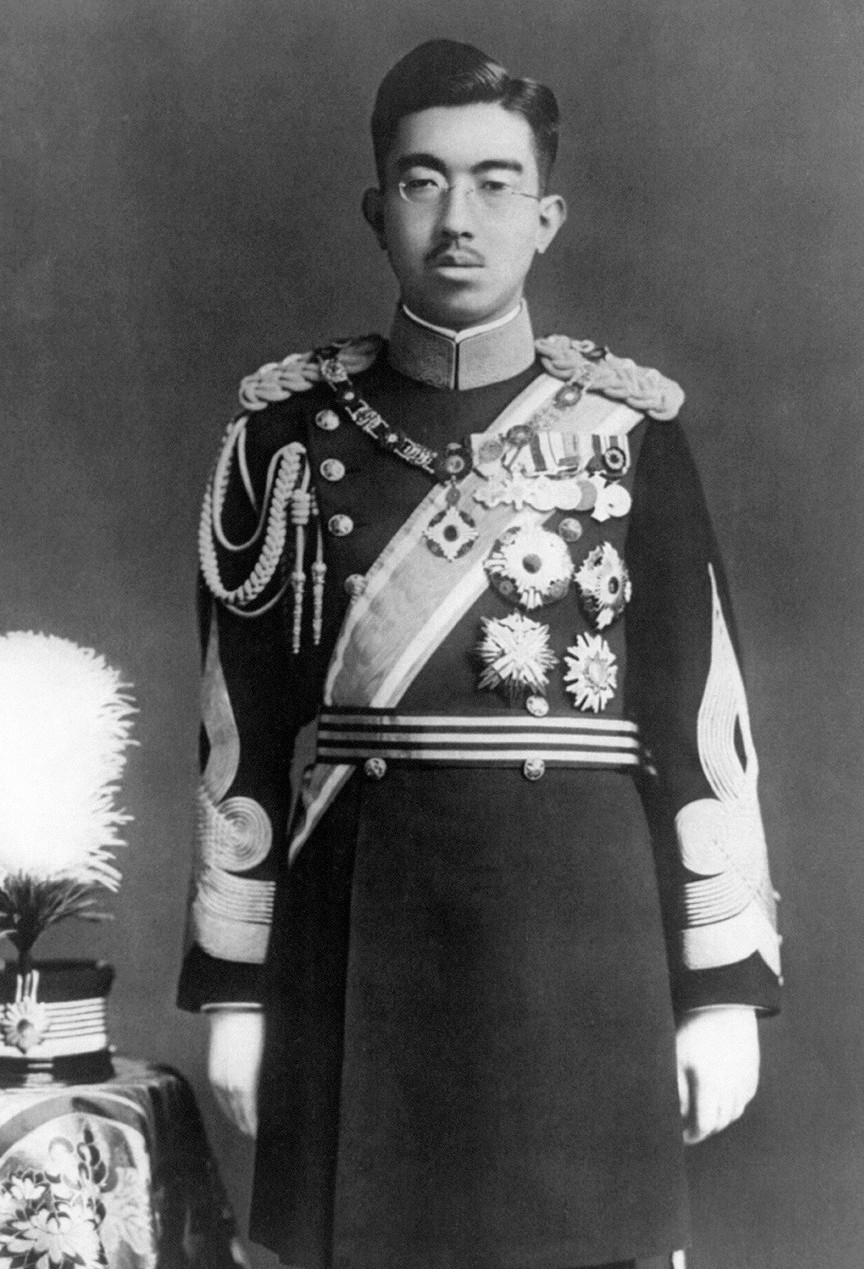
Hirohito

- February 15 – Minoru Inuzuka, film director and screenwriter (2007)
- February 16 – Koji Shima, film director, actor, and screenwriter (1986)
- February 17 – Motojirō Kajii, writer (d. 1932)
- March 10 – Mushitaro Oguri, novelist (1946)
- March 27 – Eisaku Satō, Prime Minister of Japan, recipient of the Nobel Peace Prize (d. 1975)
- April 19 – Kiyoshi Oka, mathematician (d. 1978)
- April 29
  - Hotsumi Ozaki, journalist and soviet spy (d. 1944)
  - Hirohito, 124th Emperor of Japan (d. 1989)
- June 21 – Mitsuko Yoshikawa, FILM actress (d. 1991)
- July 10 – Eiji Tsuburaya, Japanese film director and special effects designer (d. 1970)
- September 9 – Hideo Oguma, poet (d. 1940)
- November 4 – Princess Masako Nashimoto, consort of Crown Prince Euimin of Korea (d. 1989)
- November 5 – Chōgorō Kaionji, writer (1976)
- December 12 – Ihei Kimura, photographer (d. 1974)

== Deaths ==
- January 20 – Keisuke Ito, physician and biologist (b. 1803)
- February 3 – Fukuzawa Yukichi, writer and educator (b. 1835)
- March 29 – Ōshima Takatō, engineer (b. 1826)
- June 6 – Oda Nobutoshi, former daimyō (b. 1853)
- June 21 – Hoshi Tōru, politician and cabinet minister (b. 1850)
- August 19 – Shō Tai, last king of the Ryukyu Kingdom (b. 1843)
- December 13 – Nakae Chōmin, philosopher and journalist (b. 1847)
