= 1904 in Japan =

- Decades: 1880s; 1890s; 1900s; 1910s; 1920s
- See also: Other events of 1904; History of Japan; Timeline; Years

Events in the year 1904 in Japan. It corresponds to Meiji 37 (明治37年) in the Japanese calendar.

== Incumbents ==
- Emperor: Emperor Meiji
- Prime Minister: Katsura Tarō

=== Governors ===
- Aichi Prefecture: Masaaki Nomura
- Akita Prefecture: Ichiro Tsubaki then Oka Kishichiro Itami
- Aomori Prefecture: Ichiji Yamanouchi then Katsutaro Inuzuka then Shotaro Nishizawa
- Ehime Prefecture: Tai Neijro then Makoto Sugai then Kensuke Ando
- Fukui Prefecture: Suke Sakamoto
- Fukushima Prefecture: Arita Yoshisuke
- Gifu Prefecture: Kawaji Toshikyo
- Gunma Prefecture: Yoshimi Teru
- Hiroshima Prefecture: Tokuhisa Tsunenori then Yamada Shunzō
- Ibaraki Prefecture: Teru Terahara
- Iwate Prefecture: Ganri Hojo then Sokkichi Oshikawa
- Kagawa Prefecture: Motohiro Onoda
- Kochi Prefecture: Munakata Tadashi
- Kumamoto Prefecture: Egi Kazuyuki
- Kyoto Prefecture: Baron Shoichi Omori
- Mie Prefecture: Kamon Furusha then Lord Arimitsu Hideyoshi
- Miyagi Prefecture: Terumi Tanabe
- Miyazaki Prefecture: Toda Tsunetaro
- Nagano Prefecture: Seki Kiyohide
- Niigata Prefecture: Hiroshi Abe
- Oita Prefecture: Marques Okubo Toshi Takeshi then Shuichi Kinoshita then Ogura Hisashi
- Okinawa Prefecture: Shigeru Narahara
- Saga Prefecture: Seki Kiyohide
- Saitama Prefecture: Count Jissho Oogimachi then Marquis Okubo Toshi Takeshi
- Shiga Prefecture: Sada Suzuki
- Shiname Prefecture: Ihara Ko then Matsunaga Takeyoshi
- Tochigi Prefecture: Kubota Kiyochika
- Tokushima Prefecture: Saburo Iwao
- Tokyo: Baron Sangay Takatomi
- Toyama Prefecture: Rika Ryusuke
- Yamagata Prefecture: Tanaka Takamichi
- Yamanashi Prefecture: Takeda Chiyosaburo

== Events ==
- February 8–9 – Battle of Port Arthur: A surprise Japanese naval attack on Port Arthur (Lüshun) in Manchuria starts the Russo-Japanese War.
- February 9 – Battle of Chemulpo Bay
- February 23 – Japan–Korea Treaty of February 1904
- April 30–May 1 – Battle of Yalu River (1904)
- May 25–26 – Battle of Nanshan
- June 14–15 – Battle of Te-li-Ssu
- July 10 – Battle of Motien Pass
- July 24–25 – Battle of Tashihchiao
- July 31 – Battle of Hsimucheng
- August 10 – Battle of the Yellow Sea
- August 14 – Battle off Ulsan
- August 20 – Battle of Korsakov
- August 22 – Japan–Korea Agreement of August 1904
- August 24–September 4 – Battle of Liaoyang
- October 5–17 – Battle of Shaho
- Unknown date – Hirano Rubber Manufacturing, as predecessor of Toyo Tire was founded.

== Births ==
- February 9 – Kikuko Kawakami, author (d. 1985)
- May 27 – Chūhei Nambu, track and field athlete (d. 1997)
- June 1 – Ineko Sata, communist and feminist author of proletarian literature (d. 1998)
- July 9 – Hideo Oguni, Japanese writer (d. 1996)
- July 18 – Fuji Yahiro, screenwriter (d. 1986)
- July 25 – Katsuji Matsumoto, illustrator (d. 1986)
- August 7 – Taro Takemi, physician and 11th President of the Japan Medical Association (d. 1983)
- August 16 – Minoru Genda, military aviator and politician (d. 1989)
- September 1 – Aya Kōda, essayist and novelist (d. 1990)
- October 11 – Ken'ichi Enomoto, comedian and singer (d. 1970)
- November 18 – Masao Koga, composer (d. 1978)
- November 22 – Fumio Niwa, novelist (d. 2005)
- December 28 – Tatsuo Hori, writer, poet and translator (d. 1953)

== Deaths ==
- January 1 – Konoe Atsumaro, politician and journalist (b. 1863)
- January 9 – Ii Naonori, former daimyō, son of Ii Naosuke (b. 1848)
- February 6 – Utagawa Yoshiiku, artist (b. 1833)
- March 27 – Takeo Hirose, navy career officer (b. 1868)
- August 12 – Kawamura Sumiyoshi, admiral (b. 1836)
- August 31 – Tachibana Shūta, soldier (b. 1865)
- September 26 – Koizumi Yakumo, writer (b. 1850)
