= 1953 in Japan =

- Decades: 1930s; 1940s; 1950s; 1960s; 1970s
- See also: Other events of 1955; History of Japan; Timeline; Years

Events in the year 1953 in Japan.

== Incumbents ==
- Emperor: Hirohito
- Prime minister: Shigeru Yoshida (Liberal Democratic)
- Chief Cabinet Secretary: Taketora Ogata until March 24, Kenji Fukunaga
- Chief Justice of the Supreme Court: Kōtarō Tanaka
- President of the House of Representatives: Banboku Ōno until March 14, Yasujirō Tsutsumi from May 18
- President of the House of Councillors: Naotake Satō until May 19, Yahachi Kawai

=== Governors ===
- Aichi Prefecture: Mikine Kuwahara
- Akita Prefecture: Tokuji Ikeda
- Aomori Prefecture: Bunji Tsushima
- Chiba Prefecture: Hitoshi Shibata
- Ehime Prefecture: Sadatake Hisamatsu
- Fukui Prefecture: Harukazu Obata
- Fukuoka Prefecture: Katsuji Sugimoto
- Fukushima Prefecture: Sakuma Ootake
- Gifu Prefecture: Kamon Muto
- Gunma Prefecture: Shigeo Kitano
- Hiroshima Prefecture: Hiroo Ōhara
- Hokkaido: Toshifumi Tanaka
- Hyogo Prefecture: Masaru Sakamoto
- Ibaraki Prefecture: Yoji Tomosue
- Ishikawa Prefecture: Wakio Shibano
- Iwate Prefecture: Kenkichi Kokubun
- Kagawa Prefecture: Masanori Kaneko
- Kagoshima Prefecture: Katsushi Terazono
- Kanagawa Prefecture: Iwataro Uchiyama
- Kochi Prefecture: Wakaji Kawamura
- Kumamoto Prefecture: Saburō Sakurai
- Kyoto Prefecture: Torazō Ninagawa
- Mie Prefecture: Masaru Aoki
- Miyagi Prefecture: Otogorō Miyagi
- Miyazaki Prefecture: Nagashige Tanaka
- Nagano Prefecture: Torao Hayashi
- Nagasaki Prefecture: Takejirō Nishioka
- Nara Prefecture: Ryozo Okuda
- Niigata Prefecture: Shohei Okada
- Oita Prefecture: Tokuju Hosoda
- Okayama Prefecture: Yukiharu Miki
- Osaka Prefecture: Bunzō Akama
- Saga Prefecture: Naotsugu Nabeshima
- Saitama Prefecture: Yuuichi Oosawa
- Shiga Prefecture: Kotaro Mori
- Shiname Prefecture: Yasuo Tsunematsu
- Shizuoka Prefecture: Toshio Saitō
- Tochigi Prefecture: Juukichi Kodaira
- Tokushima Prefecture: Kuniichi Abe
- Tokyo: Seiichirō Yasui
- Tottori Prefecture: Shigeru Endo
- Toyama Prefecture: Kunitake Takatsuji
- Wakayama Prefecture: Shinji Ono
- Yamagata Prefecture: Michio Murayama
- Yamaguchi Prefecture: Tatsuo Tanaka (until 24 March); Taro Ozawa (starting 30 April)
- Yamanashi Prefecture: Hisashi Amano

== Events ==
- date unknown – The Japanese 10 yen coin is issued with serrated edges for a 5-year period, beginning in 1953. All 10 yen coins since have had smooth edges.
- June–August – Heavy massive rain, landslides, and flooding in western and southwestern Japan kill an estimated 2,566, and injure 9,433, mainly at Kizugawa, Wakayama, Kumamoto, and Kitakyushu.
- January 4 – NHK Radio broadcasts its first live marathon coverage.
- June 18 – Tachikawa air disaster – 129 die after a United States Air Force Douglas C-124 Globemaster II crashes shortly after taking off from Tachikawa Airfield.
- June 25 – 1953 North Kyushu flood hit in Chikugo River, Kitakyushu and Kumamoto area, 1013 persons were human fatalities, 2775 persons were hurt, according to Japanese government official confirmed report.
- July 20 – 1953 Kii Peninsula flood, according to Japanese government official confirmed report, 1124 persons were human fatalities, 5819 persons were wounded.
- August 15 – 1953 South Yamashiro flood, 429 person were human fatalities, with 994 person were hurt, according to Japanese government official confirmed report.
- September 23 – 1953 Typhoon Tess, 478 person were human fatalities, with 2559 persons were hurt, Japanese government official confirmed report.
- December 25 – The Amami Islands are returned to Japan from the US military following 8 years of occupation.
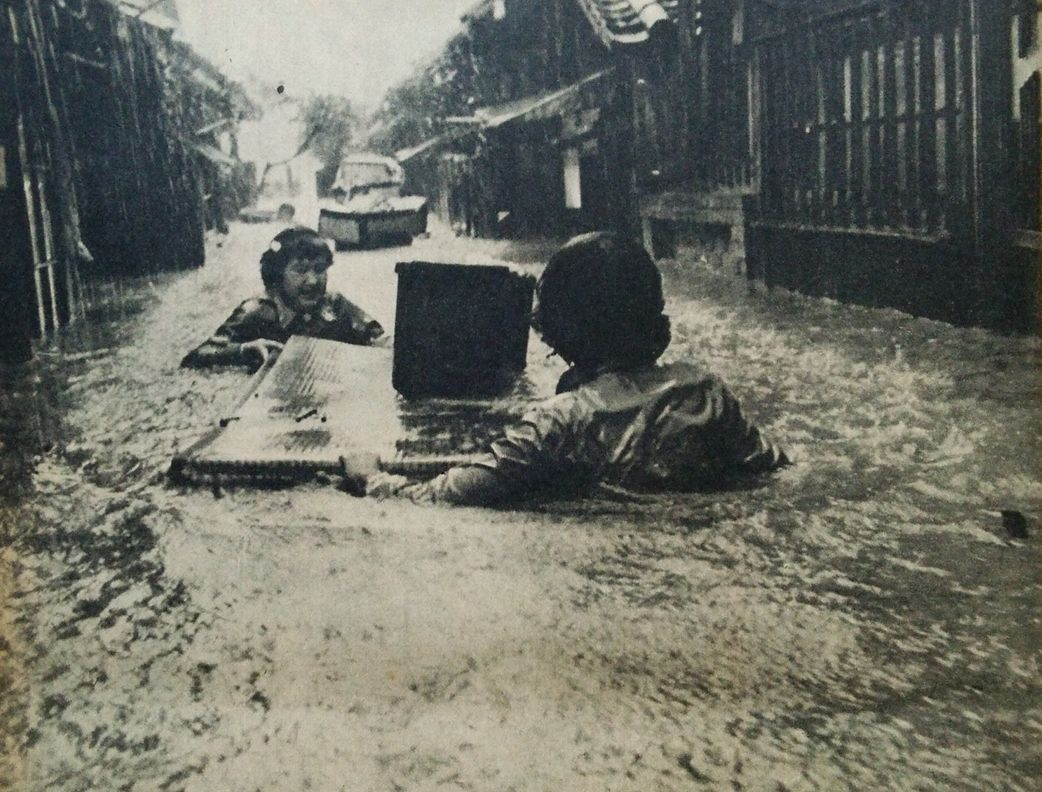
A flood swept damage in Kokura of 1953 North Kyushu flood

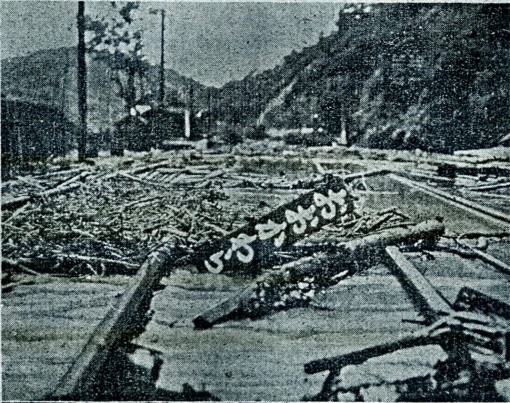
Damage in Ōkawara station by 1953 South Yamashiro Flood

== Births ==
- January 9
  - Shigeru So, former long-distance runner
  - Takeshi So, former long-distance runner
- January 29 – Yorie Terauchi, actress
- February 4 – Kitarō, New Age musician
- February 13 – Kaoru Kurimoto, novelist and writer (d. 2009)
- February 23 – Satoru Nakajima, racing car driver
- February 28 – Kōzō Murashita, singer and songwriter (d. 1999)
- March 2 – Kazuo Kitagawa, politician (Komeito)
- March 18 – Takashi Yoshimatsu, composer
- May 1 – Mayumi Aoki, swimmer
- May 4 – Masashi Ebara, actor and voice actor
- June 4 – Susumu Ojima, entrepreneur
- June 6 – June Yamagishi, Japanese guitarist
- July 12 – Akinobu Mayumi, former professional baseball player and coach
- July 14 – Katsuya Okada, politician
- July 19 – Shōichi Nakagawa, politician (d. 2009)
- July 31 – Tōru Furuya, actor, voice actor and narrator
- August 4 – Masataka Nashida, former professional baseball player and coach
- November 28 – Taeko Onuki, singer-songwriter
- December 6 – Masami Kurumada, manga artist and writer
- December 9 – Hiromitsu Ochiai, former professional baseball player and coach
- December 17 – Ikue Mori, drummer, composer, graphic designer
- December 28 – Tatsumi Fujinami, professional wrestler

== Deaths ==
- January 4 – Yasuhito, Prince Chichibu
- February 19 – Nobutake Kondō, admiral
- May 28 – Tatsuo Hori, writer, poet and translator (b. 1904)
- July 7 – Tsumasaburō Bandō, actor
- September 7 – Nobuyuki Abe, politician, military leader, Prime Minister

== See also ==
- List of Japanese films of 1953
