= Enzo Matsunaga =

Japanese author

Enzo Matsunaga (松永 延造, Matsunaga Enzō, April 26, 1895 – November 20, 1938) was a Japanese writer. He was born in Yokohama, Japan.

== Major work(s) ==
Matsunaga's major work(s) include:

- 夢を喰ふ人
