= 1895 in Japan =

- Decades: 1870s; 1880s; 1890s; 1900s; 1910s
- See also: Other events of 1895; History of Japan; Timeline; Years

Events in the year 1895 in Japan. It corresponds to Meiji 28 (明治28年) in the Japanese calendar.

== Incumbents ==
- Emperor: Emperor Meiji
- Prime Minister: Itō Hirobumi

=== Governors ===
- Aichi Prefecture: Tokito Konkyo
- Akita Prefecture: Yasuhiko Hirayama
- Aomori Prefecture: Masa Sawa
- Ehime Prefecture: Chang Masaya Komaki
- Fukui Prefecture: Kunizo Arakawa
- Fukuoka Prefecture: Kojiro Iwasaki
- Fukushima Prefecture: Yoshio Kusaka then Yasutaro Hara
- Gifu Prefecture: Michio Sokabe then Sukeo Kabayama
- Gunma Prefecture: Motootoko Nakamura
- Hiroshima Prefecture: Baron Nabeshima Miki
- Ibaraki Prefecture: Takasaki then Egi Kazuyuki
- Iwate Prefecture: Ichizo Hattori
- Kagawa Prefecture: Baron Umashi Obata then Ichizo Fukano
- Kochi Prefecture: Ishida Eikichi
- Kumamoto Prefecture: Matsudaira Masanao
- Kyoto Prefecture: Baron Nobumichi Yamada
- Mie Prefecture: Shangyi Narukawa
- Miyagi Prefecture: Minoru Katsumata
- Nagano Prefecture: Asada Tokunori
- Niigata Prefecture: Baron Seung Zhi Kuwata
- Oita Prefecture: Tameharu Yamada
- Okinawa Prefecture: Shigeru Narahara
- Osaka Prefecture: Utsumi Tadakatsu
- Saga Prefecture: Teru Tanabe
- Saitama Prefecture: Tomi Senketaka
- Shiname Prefecture: Michio Sokabe
- Tochigi Prefecture: Sato Nobu
- Tokyo: Miura Yasushi
- Toyama Prefecture: Tokuhisa Tsunenori
- Yamagata Prefecture: Shuichi Kinoshita

== Events ==
- January 20-February 12 - Battle of Weihaiwei
- January 31 - The Kyoto Electric Railway, the first electric railway in Japan, begins operation.
- March 4 - Battle of Yingkou
- March 23–26 - Pescadores Campaign (1895)
- May 2 – Kiyō Saving Bank, as predecessor of Kiyō Bank was established in Wakayama Prefecture.
- May 29-October 21 - Japanese invasion of Taiwan (1895)
- June 2–3 - Battle of Keelung
- June 11-August 2 - Hsinchu Campaign
- August 27 - Battle of Baguashan
- September 25 – Bank of Ashikaga (足利銀行) was established in Tochigi Prefecture.
- October 9 - Battle of Chiayi
- October 11 - Battle of Chiatung
- October 19 – Nekata Bank (根方銀行), as predecessor of Suruga Bank was founded in Shizuoka Prefecture.
- November 26 - Battle of Changhsing
- Unknown date – Genzo Shimazu Battery Manufacturing, as predecessor of GS Yuasa was founded in Kyoto.

== Births ==
- January 19 - Isamu Cho, army officer (d. 1945)
- January 21 - Noe Itō, anarchist and feminist (d. 1923)
- February 23 - Iwao Matsuda (general) (d. 1979)
- March 2 - Sanji Iwabuchi, admiral (d. 1945)
- April 26 - Enzo Matsunaga, writer (d. 1948)
- September 25 - Masafumi Arima, admiral (d. 1944)
- November 17 - Unichi Hiratsuka, printmaker (d. 1997)
- December 11 - Kiyoto Kagawa, admiral (d. 1943)
- December 25 - Mitsuharu Kaneko, poet and painter (d. 1975)
- Heihachirō Kojima, photographer
- Keiichirō Yoshino, photographer

== Deaths ==
- January 15 - Prince Arisugawa Taruhito
- February 9 - Ōdera Yasuzumi
- February 20 - Kōno Bairei
- April 20 - Kōno Togama
- November 5 - Prince Kitashirakawa Yoshihisa
