= Ryu Saito =

Japanese footballer

Ryu Saito 齋藤 竜
Personal information
- Full name: Ryu Saito
- Date of birth: September 18, 1979 (age 47)
- Place of birth: Muroran, Hokkaido, Japan
- Height: 1.83 m (6 ft 0 in)
- Position: Defender

Youth career
- 1995–1997: Muroran Otani High School
- 1998–2001: Kokushikan University

Senior career*
Years	Team	Apps	(Gls)
2002–2005	Cerezo Osaka	18	(1)
2005–2006	Thespa Kusatsu	68	(1)
2007	FC Gifu	10	(0)
Total		96	(2)
Medal record
Cerezo Osaka
Runner-up	Emperor's Cup	2003
- * Club domestic league appearances and goals

Ryu Saito (齋藤 竜, Saitō Ryū; born September 18, 1979) is a former Japanese football player.

== Playing career ==
Saito was born in Muroran on September 18, 1979. After graduating from Kokushikan University, he joined J2 League club Cerezo Osaka in 2002. Although he could not play at all in the match, Cerezo was promoted to J1 League end of 2002 season. He debuted as center back in 2003 and played many matches until 2004. In April 2005, he moved to newly was promoted to J2 club Thespa Kusatsu. He became a regular center back and played many matches in 2 seasons. In 2007, he moved to Japan Football League club FC Gifu. He retired at the end of the 2007 season.

== Club statistics ==
Club performance			League		Cup		League Cup		Total	
Season	Club	League	Apps	Goals	Apps	Goals	Apps	Goals	Apps	Goals
Japan			League		Emperor's Cup		J.League Cup		Total	
2002	Cerezo Osaka	J2 League	0	0	0	0	-		0	0
2003	Cerezo Osaka	J1 League	10	1	0	0	2	0	12	1
2004	Cerezo Osaka	J1 League	8	0	1	0	3	0	12	0
2005	Cerezo Osaka	J1 League	0	0	0	0	0	0	0	0
2005	Thespa Kusatsu	J2 League	26	0	2	0	-		28	0
2006	Thespa Kusatsu	J2 League	42	1	2	1	-		44	2
2007	FC Gifu	Football League	10	0	1	0	-		11	0
Career total			96	2	6	1	5	0	107	3
