= 1897 in Japan =

- Decades: 1870s; 1880s; 1890s; 1900s; 1910s
- See also: Other events of 1897; History of Japan; Timeline; Years

Events from the year 1897 in Japan. It corresponds to Meiji 30 (明治30年) in the Japanese calendar.

== Incumbents ==
- Emperor: Emperor Meiji
- Prime Minister: Matsukata Masayoshi

=== Governors ===
- Aichi Prefecture: Tokito Konkyo then Egi Kazuyuki
- Akita Prefecture: Saburo Iwao
- Aomori Prefecture: Naomasa Maki then Ichiro Konoshu
- Ehime Prefecture: Chang Masaya Komaki then Yutori Kojiro then Park Shin Maki Naomasa
- Fukui Prefecture: Kunizo Arakawa then Denzaburo Hatano then Shingo Seki
- Fukushima Prefecture: Akiyama then Kimumichi Nagusami
- Gifu Prefecture: Sukeo Kabayama then Yoshinori Yumoto
- Gunma Prefecture: Masataka Ishizata
- Hiroshima Prefecture: Orita Heinai then Asada Tokunori
- Ibaraki Prefecture: Egi Kazuyuki then Motohiro Onoda then Prince Kiyoshi Honba
- Iwate Prefecture: Ichizo Hattori
- Kagawa Prefecture: Tsunenori Tokuhisa
- Kochi Prefecture: Ishida Eikichi then Hiroshi Shikakui
- Kumamoto Prefecture: Kanetake Oura
- Kyoto Prefecture: Baron Nobumichi Yamada then Baron Utsumi Tadakatsu
- Mie Prefecture: Terumi Tanabe
- Miyagi Prefecture: Minoru Katsumata then Sukeo Kabayama
- Miyazaki Prefecture: Senda Sadakatsuki
- Nagano Prefecture: Takasaki Chikaaki then Gondo Ka'nichi
- Niigata Prefecture: Asada Tokunori then Minoru Katsumata
- Oita Prefecture: Yasuhiko Hirayama then Shigetoo Sugimoto
- Okinawa Prefecture: Shigeru Narahara
- Osaka Prefecture: Utsumi Tadakatsu then Tokito Konkyo
- Saga Prefecture: Akira Oyama
- Saitama Prefecture: Tomi Senketaka
- Shiname Prefecture: Michio Sokabe then Hikoji Nakamura
- Tochigi Prefecture: Sato Nobu then Egi Kazuyuki then Sento Kiyoshi
- Tokyo: Marquis Michitsune Koga then Viscount Okabe Nagahon
- Toyama Prefecture: Ando Kinsuke then Tsurayuki Ishida
- Yamagata Prefecture: Shuichi Kinoshita then Kikuchi Karasu

== Events ==
- January 17 – A first issue newspaper, Kahoku Shinpō was published in Miyagi Prefecture.
- May – Opening of the Kyoto National Museum.
- June 1 – Opening of Matsugishi Station in Chōshi, Chiba.
- June 10 – Founding of the publishing company Jitsugyo no Nihon Sha.
- June 18 – establishment of Kyoto University under the name Kyoto Imperial University.

== Births ==
- March 2 – Shizue Kato, politician and activist (d. 2001)
- March 28 – Yusuke Hagihara, astronomer (d. 1979)
- April 19 – Jiroemon Kimura, supercentenarian, oldest man ever, world's oldest living person from December 2012 to June 2013. (d. 2013)
- October 10 – Shigeji Tsuboi, poet (d. 1975)
- October 23 – Yae Ibuka, nurse (d. 1989)
- November 12 – Eddie Imazu, art director (d. 1979)
- November 17 – Kinichiro Sakaguchi, agricultural chemist and microbiologist (d. 1994)
- November 28 – Chiyo Uno, writer and author (d. 1996)
- December 8 – Prince Fushimi Hiroyoshi, naval officer (d. 1938; myocardial infarction)
- December 26 – Unno Juza, writer, founding father of Japanese science fiction (d. 1949)

== Deaths ==
- August 24 – Mutsu Munemitsu, statesman and diplomat (b. 1844)
- November 29 – Mitsukuri Rinsho, statesman and legal scholar (born 1846)
