= 1892 in Japan =

- Decades: 1870s; 1880s; 1890s; 1900s; 1910s
- See also: Other events of 1892; History of Japan • Timeline • Years

Events from the year 1892 in Japan. It corresponds to Meiji 25 (明治25年) in the Japanese calendar.

== Incumbents ==
- Emperor: Emperor Meiji
- Prime Minister:
  - Matsukata Masayoshi: (until 8 August)
  - Itō Hirobumi: (from 8 August)

=== Governors ===
- Aichi Prefecture: Takatoshi Iwamura then Senda Sadaaki then Senda Sadaaki then Yasujo then Tokito Konkyo
- Akita Prefecture: Yasuhiko Hirayama
- Aomori Prefecture: Masa Sawa
- Ehime Prefecture: Katsumata Minoru
- Fukui Prefecture: Nobuaki Makino then Kunizo Arakawa
- Fukuoka Prefecture: Yasujo then Tameharu Yamada
- Fukushima Prefecture: Kiyoshi Watanabe then Yoshio Kusaka
- Gifu Prefecture: Toshi Kozaki
- Gunma Prefecture: Motootoko Nakamura
- Hiroshima Prefecture: Baron Takatoshi Iwamura then Senda Sadaaki
- Ibaraki Prefecture: Shoichiro Ishii then Nobuaki Makino
- Iwate Prefecture: Ichizo Hattori
- Kagawa Prefecture: Masao Tanimori
- Kochi Prefecture: Kanji Maruoka then Ishida Eikichi
- Kumamoto Prefecture: Matsudaira Masanao
- Kyoto Prefecture: Baron Kokudo Kitagaki then Baron Akira Senda
- Mie Prefecture: Shangyi Narukawa
- Miyagi Prefecture: Mamoru Funakoshi
- Miyazaki Prefecture: Takayoshi Kyoganu
- Nagano Prefecture: Asada Tokunori
- Niigata Prefecture: Baron Seung Zhi Kuwata
- Oita Prefecture: Baron Shirane Senitsu
- Okinawa Prefecture: Kanji Maruoka then Shigeru Narahara
- Osaka Prefecture: Nobumichi Yamada
- Saga Prefecture: Sukeo Kabayama then Takaya Nagamine
- Saitama Prefecture: Kanichi Kubota then Tsunao Hayashi
- Shimane Prefecture: Goro Shinozaki
- Tochigi Prefecture: Orita Hirauchi
- Tokyo: Tomita Tetsunosuke
- Toyama Prefecture: Moriyama Shigeru then Tokuhisa Tsunenori
- Yamagata Prefecture: Hasebe Ren

== Events ==
- February 15 - General election
- May 5 – A first issue of Chugoku Shinbun Newspaper published in Hiroshima Prefecture.

== Births ==
- January 25 - Takeo Takagi, admiral (d. 1944)
- February 1 - Kan Shimozawa, novelist (d. 1968)
- February 5 - Shunji Isaki, admiral (d. 1943)
- March 1 - Akutagawa Ryūnosuke, writer (d. 1927)
- March 30 - Sanzo Nosaka, one of the founders of the Japanese Communist Party (d. 1993)
- April 9 - Haruo Satō, novelist and poet (d. 1964)
- June 27 - Yumio Nasu, major general (d. 1942)
- August 11 - Eiji Yoshikawa, writer and novelist (d. 1962)
- August 17 - Tamon Yamaguchi, admiral (d. 1942)
- September 9 - Tsuru Aoki, actress (d. 1961)
- October 3 - Sentarō Ōmori, admiral (d. 1974)
- October 16 - Kiyonao Ichiki, military officer (died 1942)
- December 15 - Akira Mutō, general (d. 1948)

== Deaths ==
- January 23 – Ueki Emori, revolutionary (b. 1857)
- June 9 – Yoshitoshi, artist (b. 1839)
