= 1898 in Japan =

- Decades: 1870s; 1880s; 1890s; 1900s; 1910s
- See also: Other events of 1898; History of Japan; Timeline; Years

Events from the year 1898 in Japan. It corresponds to Meiji 31 (明治31年) in the Japanese calendar.

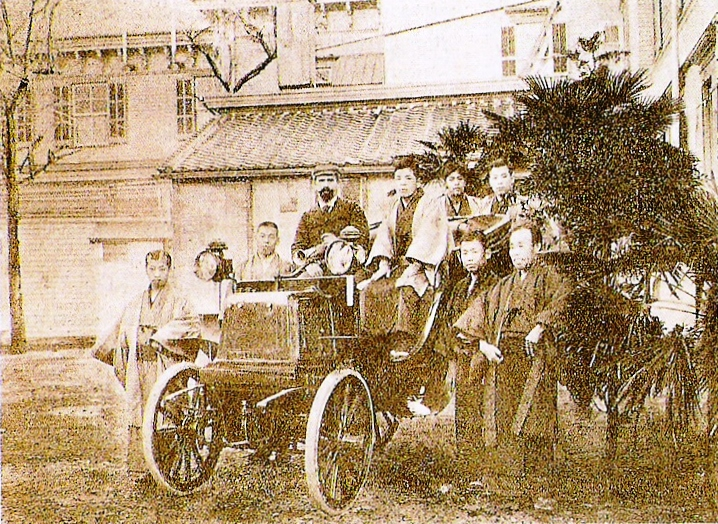
The first automobile in Japan, a French Panhard-Levassor, in 1898

== Incumbents ==
- Emperor: Emperor Meiji
- Prime Minister:
  - Matsukata Masayoshi: until January 12:
  - Itō Hirobumi: January 12 – June 30
  - Ōkuma Shigenobu: June 30 – November 8
  - Yamagata Aritomo: starting November 8

=== Governors ===
- Aichi Prefecture: Egi Kazuyuki then Baron Mori Mamoru
- Akita Prefecture: Saburo Iwao
- Aomori Prefecture: Ichiro Konoshu
- Ehime Prefecture: Park Shin Maki Naomasa then Goro Shinozaki then Oba Kan'ichi
- Fukui Prefecture: Shingo Seki
- Fukushima Prefecture: Kimumichi Nagusami
- Gifu Prefecture: Yoshinori Yumoto then Anraku Kanemichi
- Gunma Prefecture: Masataka Ishizata
- Hiroshima Prefecture: Asada Tokunori then Baron Takatoshi Iwamura then Hattori Ichizo then Asada Tokunori
- Ibaraki Prefecture: Motohiro Onada then Prince Kiyoshi Honba
- Ishikawa Prefecture: Shiba Sankarasu
- Iwate Prefecture: Ichizo Hattori then Suehiro Naokata
- Kagawa Prefecture: Tsunenori Tokuhisa then Ryosuke Ono then Yoshihara Saburo
- Kochi Prefecture: Hiroshi Shikakui
- Kumamoto Prefecture: Kanetake Oura
- Kyoto Prefecture: Utsumi Tadakatsu
- Mie Prefecture: Terumi Tanabe then Yuji Rika
- Miyagi Prefecture: Viscount Kanetake Oura then Kiyoshi Shin
- Miyazaki Prefecture: Senda Sadakatsuki
- Nagano Prefecture: Gondo Ka'nichi
- Niigata Prefecture: Minoru Katsumata
- Oita Prefecture: Shigetoo Sugimoto then Nori Oshikawa
- Okinawa Prefecture: Shigeru Narahara
- Osaka Prefecture: Nobumichi Yamada
- Saga Prefecture: Takeuchi then Yasuhiko Hirayama then Takeuchi then Seki Kiyohide
- Saitama Prefecture: Munakata Tadashi then Hanai Hagiwara
- Shiname Prefecture: Hikoji Nakamura then Chuzo Kono
- Tochigi Prefecture: Sento Kiyoshi then Hagino Samon
- Tokyo: Viscount Okabe Nagahon then Koizuka Furo then Baron Sangay Takatomi
- Toyama Prefecture: Tsurayuki Ishida then Hiroshi Abe then Kaneoryo Gen
- Yamagata Prefecture: Nori Oshikawa then Sone Shizuo

== Events ==
- January Unknown date – A construction brand, Kumagai Gumi was founded in Fukui City.
- January 12 – Ito Hirobumi begins his third term as Prime Minister.
- March 15 – March 1898 Japanese general election
- August 10 – September 1898 Japanese general election
- The first automobile (a Panhard-Levassor) is introduced in Japan.

== Births ==
- February 4 – Shinsui Itō, Nihonga painter (d. 1972)
- February 9 – Jūkichi Yagi, poet (d. 1927)
- February 15 – Masuji Ibuse, author (d. 1993)
- March 17 – Riichi Yokomitsu, writer (d. 1947)
- April 28 – Yuzo Saeki, painter (d. 1928)
- April 29 – Iwao Yamawaki, photographer (d. 1987)
- October 5 – Kenzō Masaoka, anime creator (d. 1988)
- October 17 – Shinichi Suzuki, violinist, (d. 1998)
- October 31 – Yoshitoshi Mori, artist (d. 1992)
- December 11 – Tarō Shōji, popular song singer (d. 1972)
- December 12 – Denji Kuroshima, author (d. 1943)
- December 27 – Inejiro Asanuma, politician, leader of the Japan Socialist Party (d. 1960)

== Deaths ==
- November 12 – Nakahama Manjirō, translator and castaway (b. 1827)
