= Ryōichi Kuroda =

Japanese jurist and politician

- 黒田 了一

Governor of Osaka Prefecture
- In office 23 April 1971 – 22 April 1979
- Monarch: Hirohito
- Preceded by: Gisen Satō
- Succeeded by: Sakae Kishi

Personal details
- Born: 16 March 1911 Kita-ku, Osaka, Japan
- Died: 24 July 2003 (aged 92)
- Party: Independent
- Education: Tohoku Imperial University

Ryōichi Kuroda (黒田了一, Kuroda Ryōichi; 16 March 1911 – 24 July 2003) was a Japanese jurist and politician from Suita, Osaka.

== Early life and academic career ==
After graduating from Tohoku Imperial University in 1933, Kuroda was sent to Manchukuo to be an instructor at a service academy. He spent five years in a Siberian labor camp before he returned to Japan in 1950, and became a professor of law at Osaka City University in 1956.

== Political career ==
Kuroda was elected governor of Osaka Prefecture in 1971, supported by the Japan Socialist Party and the Japanese Communist Party. In 1975, he became the first governor who won reelection with backing only from the Japanese Communist Party. He unsuccessfully ran for a third term in 1979.

While he was in office, Kuroda took positive antipollution measures and introduced free medical care for the elderly. He rejected a plan to build a missile base in Osaka, for he held a view that the Self-Defense Forces were unconstitutional.

== Later life ==
After he left from politics, Kuroda practiced at the bar. He became a member of the Japan Lawyers Association for Freedom in 1981.

He died of pneumonia at age 92.

Preceded by Gisen Satō	Governor of Osaka Prefecture; 1971 – 1979	Succeeded by Sakae Kishi
