= Motoaki Inukai =

Japanese footballer

Personal information
- Full name: Motoaki Inukai
- Date of birth: 5 July 1942 (age 84)
- Place of birth: Saitama, Saitama Prefecture, Japan
- Position: Midfielder

Senior career*
Years	Team	Apps	(Gls)
1965–1968	Mitsubishi Motors	27	(4)
- * Club domestic league appearances and goals

Motoaki Inukai (犬飼 基昭, Inukai Motoaki; born 5 July 1942 in Saitama, Saitama Prefecture, Japan) is a Japanese former association football player. He played for Mitsubishi Motors. He was the eleventh President of Japan Football Association from 2008 to 2010.
