= Yasushi Miura =

Japanese politician

- 三浦 靖
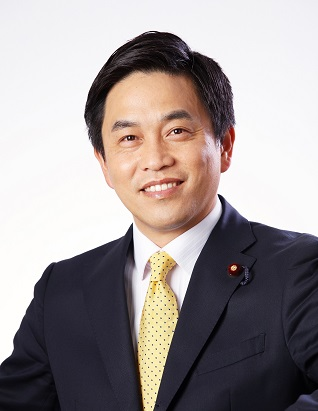
- Official portrait, 2018

Member of the House of Councillors
- In office 29 July 2019 – 28 July 2025
- Constituency: National PR

Member of the House of Representatives
- In office 25 October 2017 – 4 July 2019
- Preceded by: Multi-member district
- Succeeded by: Shōgo Azemoto
- Constituency: Chūgoku PR

Member of the Ōda City Council
- In office 2006–2017

Personal details
- Born: 9 April 1973 Ōda, Shimane, Japan
- Party: Liberal Democratic
- Education: Kanagawa University

Yasushi Miura is a Japanese politician who is a former member of the House of Councillors of Japan.

== Biography ==
He was elected in 2019.
