= 1893 in Japan =

- Decades: 1870s; 1880s; 1890s; 1900s; 1910s
- See also: Other events of 1893; History of Japan; Timeline; Years

Events in the year 1893 in Japan. It corresponds to Meiji 26 (明治26年) in the Japanese calendar.

== Incumbents ==
- Emperor: Emperor Meiji
- Prime Minister: Itō Hirobumi

=== Governors ===
- Aichi Prefecture: Tokito Konkyo
- Akita Prefecture: Yasuhiko Hirayama
- Aomori Prefecture: Masa Sawa
- Ehime Prefecture: Katsumata Minoru
- Fukui Prefecture: Kunizo Arakawa
- Fukuoka Prefecture: Tameharu Yamada then Kojiro Iwasaki
- Fukushima Prefecture: Yoshio Kusaka
- Gifu Prefecture: Toshi Kozaki then Michio Sokabe
- Gunma Prefecture: Motootoko Nakamura
- Hiroshima Prefecture: Nabeshima Miki
- Ibaraki Prefecture: Takasaki
- Iwate Prefecture: Ichizo Hattori
- Kagawa Prefecture: Masao Tanimori then Baron Umashi Obata
- Kochi Prefecture: Ishida Eikichi
- Kumamoto Prefecture: Matsudaira Masanao
- Kyoto Prefecture: Baron Akira Senda then Hiroshi Nakai
- Mie Prefecture: Shangyi Narukawa
- Miyagi Prefecture: Mamoru Funakoshi
- Nagano Prefecture: Baron Utsumi Tadakatsu then Asada Tokunori
- Niigata Prefecture: Senda Sada Akatsuki
- Oita Prefecture: Baron Shirane Senitsu
- Okinawa Prefecture: Kanji Maruoka
- Osaka Prefecture: Nobumichi Yamada
- Saga Prefecture: Takaya Nagamine
- Saitama Prefecture: Tsunao Hayashi
- Shimame Prefecture: Goro Shinozaki then Oura Kanetake
- Tochigi Prefecture: Orita Hirauchi
- Tokyo: Tomita Tetsunosuke
- Toyama Prefecture: Tokuhisa Tsunenori
- Yamagata Prefecture: Hasebe Ren

== Events ==
- Unknown date – Nagoya Life Insurance, as predecessor of T&D Holdings has founded.

== Births ==
- January 11 – Motoo Ōtaguro, music critic (d. 1979)
- May 15 – Fusae Ichikawa, politician and women's suffrage leader (d. 1981)
- October 20 – Noboru Ishizaki, admiral (d. 1959)

== Deaths ==
- January 22 – Kawatake Mokuami, playwright (b. 1816)
- June 6 – Terashima Munenori, diplomat (b. 1832)
- December 5 – Matsudaira Katamori, samurai (b. 1836)
