= Korechika =

- Gender: Male

Origin
- Origin: Japanese
- Meaning: Different meanings depending on the kanji used

Korechika (written: 惟幾 or 伊周) is a masculine Japanese given name. Notable people with the name include:

- Korechika Anami (阿南 惟幾; 1887–1945), Japanese general
- Fujiwara no Korechika (藤原 伊周; 974–1010), Japanese kugyō
