= Shunichi Munesue =

- 棟居俊一
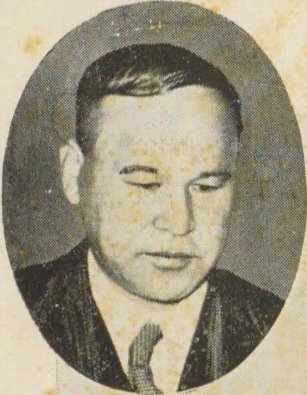
- Munesue c. 1939

Director of the Karafuto Agency
- In office 7 May 1938 – 9 April 1940
- Monarch: Hirohito
- Preceded by: Takeshi Imamura
- Succeeded by: Masayoshi Ogawa

Personal details
- Born: 28 February 1893 Yamaguchi, Japan
- Died: 3 January 1954 (aged 60)
- Education: Tokyo Imperial University

Shunichi Munesue (棟居 俊一, Munesue Shunichi; February 23, 1893 (Note: Suzuki gives a birth date of January 30, 1893) – 16 December 1945) was a career bureaucrat who primarily worked in Japan's Ministry of Colonial Affairs.

== Early life and education ==
Munesue was born in Yamaguchi Prefecture, the third son of Kichigoro Saito. He was adopted by Tamotsu Munesue, and would take his surname. In 1917, he passed the Civil Service Examination. The following year, he graduated from Tokyo University's law school.

== Career ==
After graduating, he would assume various bureaucratic roles. Ranging from tax collector to customs officer in Kobe, Kitakyushu, and Yokohama. After these roles, he successively became secretary of the second and first and second Regional Production Bureaus. Followed by secretary of the governor-general of Chōsen and chief of security at the governor-general's police bureau. In 1936, Munesue was appointed director-general of Korea's Monopoly Bureau, managing the sale of tobacco, salt, and opium in Japanese Korea. In 1937, he became director-general of the Bureau of Land Development. In 1938, Munesue became director general of the Karafuto Agency, managing Karafuto Prefecture, a role he held until 1940.

From June 3, 1944, to March 14, 1946, he served as the deputy mayor of Kyoto.

Preceded by Takeshi Imamura	Director of the Karafuto Agency; 1938-1940	Succeeded by Masayoshi Ogawa
