= Karafuto Shrine =

Defunct Shinto shrine formerly located in Yuzhno-Sakhalinsk, Russia

Coordinates: 46.9574°N 142.7606°E

Karafuto Jinja (樺太神社)
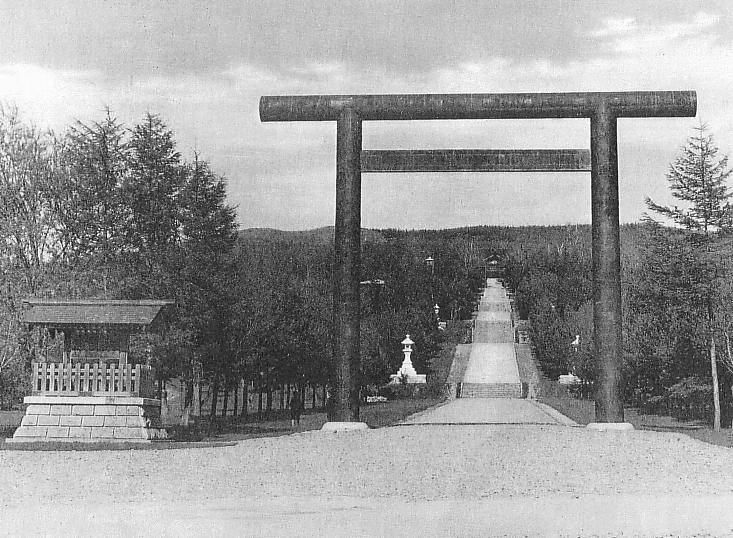
- Karafuto Shrine in the 1930s

- Location within Russia

Religion
- Affiliation: Shinto

Karafuto Shrine (樺太神社, Karafuto jinja) was a Shinto shrine in Toyohara, Karafuto Prefecture in what is now Sakhalin Oblast, Russia.

The shrine was established in 1911, and its main annual festival was held on August 23. Kami enshrined here included Okunitama no kami (大国魂神), Ōkuninushi (as 大己貴神) and Sukunabikona (少彦名命).

It was formerly a national shrine of the first rank (国幣大社, kokuhei taisha) in the Modern system of ranked Shinto Shrines.

Following the Soviet occupation of southern Sakhalin, the shrine would continue to operate until repatriation was completed in 1949. It would later be demolished alongside other Japanese institutions and monuments. There are currently plaques marking the former location of the Karafuto Shrine, and two of the shrine's Komainu are now placed at the entrance of the Sakhalin Regional Museum.

== See also ==
- Nishikubo Shrine
