= Otasu =

- Village
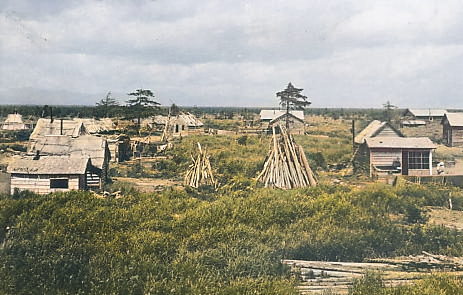
- Colorized photo of Otasu
- Country: Empire of Japan
- Prefecture: Karafuto Prefecture

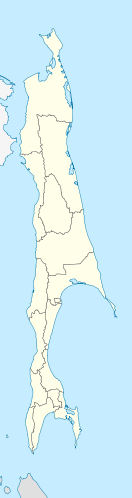
Otasu's Location

Otasu (オタス) was a settlement in Shisuka (today Poronaysk) created for the indigenous people of Karafuto Prefecture at the beginning of the Showa era. It was a reservation for Sakhalin's Uilta, Nivkh, Ulch, Evenki, and Yakuts. It was located on a dune situated at the river delta of the Poronay and Leonidovka rivers. Due to its separation from the town of Shisuka proper and its island-like characteristics, it was also known as Otasu Forest (オタスのもり, Otasu no mori).

In 1934, author Fumiko Hayashi detailed the settlement in her book Journey to Karafuto.

== Etymology ==
The settlement's name came from the Ainu language word Otasuh. With ota (オタ) meaning sandy beach, and suh (スㇷ) meaning sandy beach. This name was shared with another Karafuto locale in the town of Chinnai (today Krasnogorsk in Tomarinsky District.)

In the Hokkaido Ainu dialect, suh (スㇷ) is pronounced as sut (スッ). Place names such as Utatsutsu Village in Suttsu District, Hokkaido are derived from the phrase. It appears in Ainu oral literature as well.

== History ==
With the end of the Russo-Japanese War and the signing of the Treaty of Portsmouth, Japan annexed the southern half of Sakhalin below the 50th parallel north, designating it Karafuto Prefecture. In addition to Sakhalin Ainu, the territory contained other indigenous minority populations, mostly concentrated in the center of the island. Unlike the Ainu, they were not integrated into Japanese populations.

Until 1920, Japanese authorities largely did not interfere with the affairs of the Nivkh and Uilta population. From 1926 to 1927, measures were taken to segregate these native populations. This resulted in the establishment of Otasu.

The reason for this change in policy was allegedly influenced by Dmitri Vynokurof. A wealthy Yakut merchant nicknamed "The Reindeer King" who defected to Japan in 1925, when the Japanese occupation of northern Sakhalin concluded.

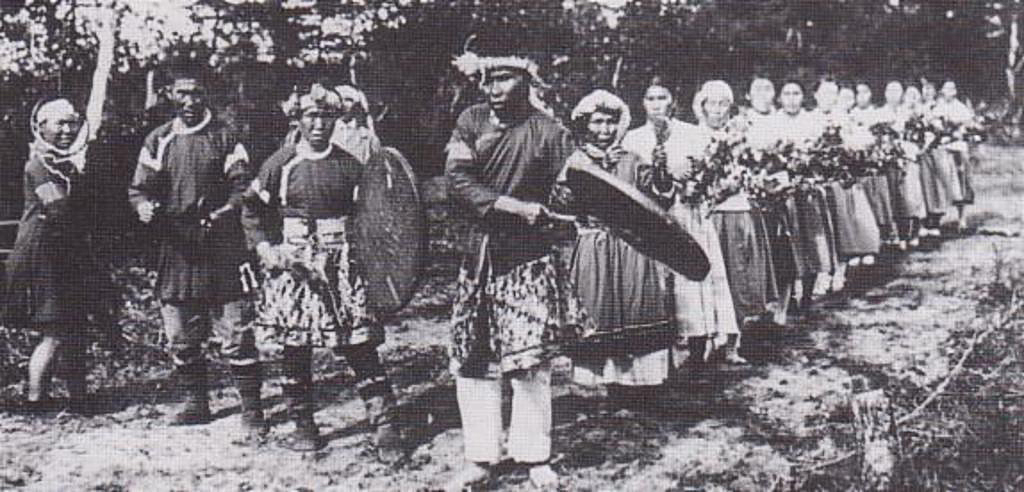
Nivkh men and women in Otasu

Due to Otasu's diverse population, it gained popularity as an exotic tourist attraction. However by 1930, less than half of the 304 Uilta and 109 Nivkh registered in the settlement actually lived in Otasu. The Uilta in Otasu adopted a sedentary lifestyle when compared to Uilta in northern Sakhalin, which maintained a more traditional reindeer-herding lifestyle.

In July 1930, an educational establishment for Otasu's residents was constructed. In 1936, a Shinto shrine was completed in the settlement.

While education in the Japanese language was given to the settlement's natives, they were distinguished from residents from Mainland Japan in family registers as "Karafuto natives." A right that would be extended to Ainu in 1931. While the Ainu and ethnic Japanese on Karafuto were governed by criminal law and civil law, only criminal law applied to Nivkh and Uilta.

With the start of the Pacific War, the Imperial Japanese Army sought Nivkh and Uilta men to monitor Soviet Army movements.. This resulted in Nivkh and 22 Uilta men being recruited from Otasu, being given Japanese names, and assigned to Tokumukikan (secret services) for intelligence gathering.

== Notable people ==
- Dahinien Gendānu - Uilta activist who relocated to Abashiri after WWII.

== See also ==
- Hokkaido University Bone Scandal
- Indian reservation
