= Toshio Ōtsu =

Japanese bureaucrat (1893–1958)

- 大津 敏男
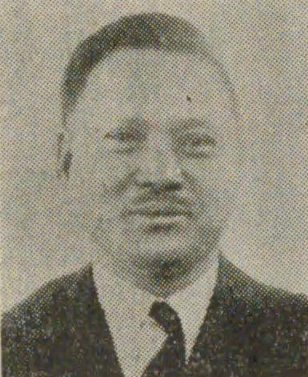

Director of the Karafuto Agency
- In office 1 July 1943 – 17 November 1947
- Monarch: Hirohito
- Preceded by: Masayoshi Ogawa
- Succeeded by: Office abolished

Governor of Saitama Prefecture
- In office 9 January 1942 – 1 July 1943
- Monarch: Hirohito
- Preceded by: Miyano Shozo
- Succeeded by: Kaneomi Sudō

Personal details
- Born: 26 October 1893
- Died: 27 December 1958 (aged 65)
- Education: Tokyo Imperial University

Toshio Ōtsu (Japanese: 大津敏男; 26 October 1893 – 27 December 1958) was the last Director of the Japanese Sakhalin (1943–1947) and the first and only governor of the mainland Japanese Karafuto Prefecture. After the end of his tenure, the prefecture was abolished with the incorporation of Karafuto into the Soviet Union. Prior to this he was Governor of Saitama Prefecture (1942–1943). As prefectural governor he held the status of a first rank counselor and had the right to meet with the emperor. He was a graduate of Tokyo Imperial University. After the defeat of the Empire of Japan in World War II, he was initially placed under house arrest by the Red Army. However, soon after the arrival of Dmitrii Kriukov, the new civil administrator of Sakhalin and the Kuriles, in late September 1945, Ōtsu agreed to administer southern Sakhalin on behalf of the Soviets. On 12 January 1946, he was taken to Krasnaya Rechka prison near Khabarovsk. After his release, Ōtsu returned to Japan and in 1951 became the second head of Zenkoku Karafuto Renmei, an association of former residents of Karafuto.

Preceded by Miyano Shozo	Governor of Saitama Prefecture; 1942–1943	Succeeded by Kaneomi Sudo
Preceded by Masayoshi Ogawa	Governor of Karafuto Prefecture; 1943–1947	Succeeded by Agency abolished, cession of prefecture
