= Sakhalin Regional Museum =

Sakhalin Regional Museum of Local Lore
- Сахалинский областной краеведческий музей
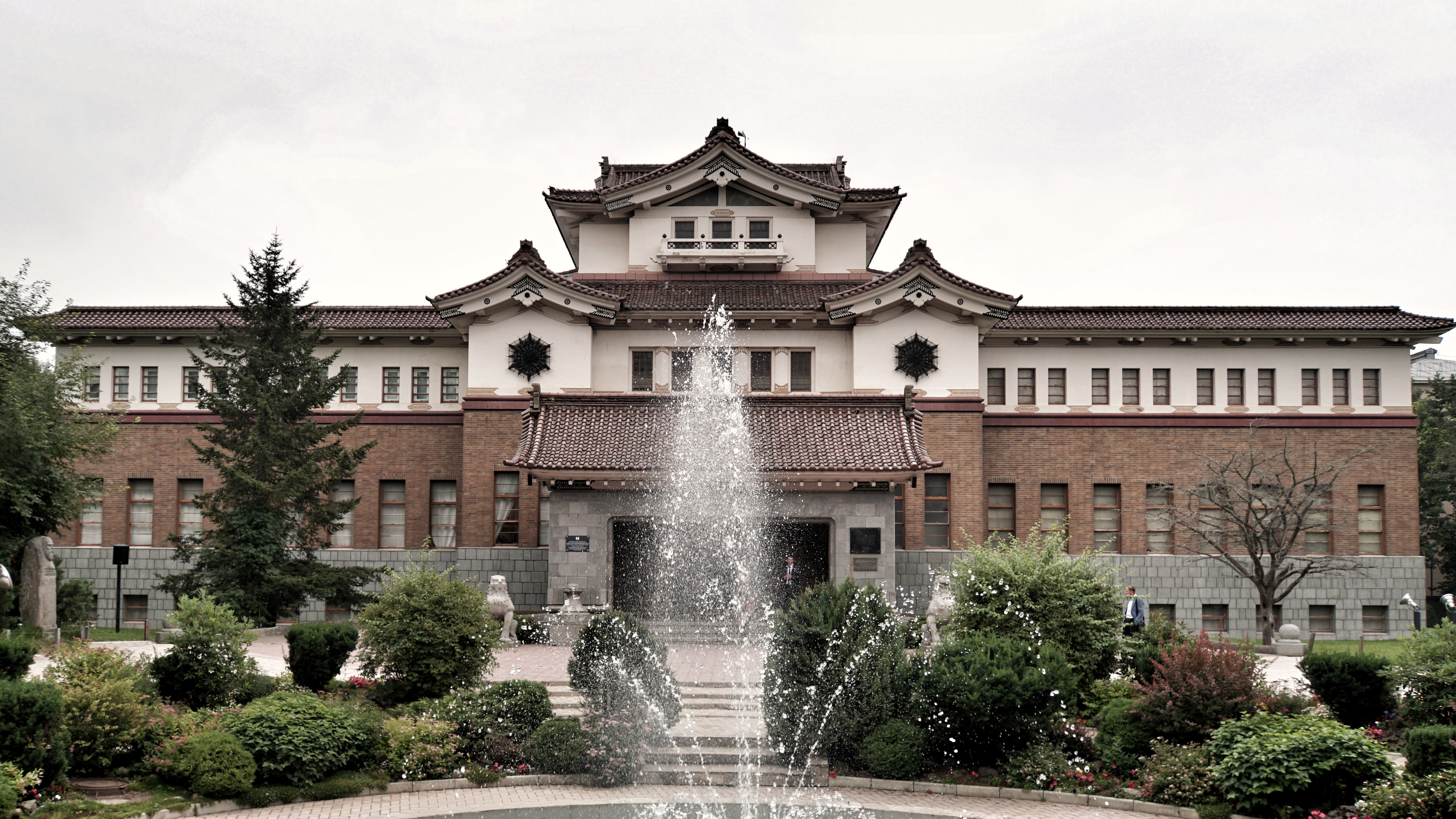
- Interactive map of the Sakhalin Regional Museum of Local Lore area

General information
- Location: 29 Kommunisticheskiy prospekt, Yuzhno-Sakhalinsk, Sakhalin Oblast, Russia
- Coordinates: 46°57′32″N 142°44′40″E
- Opened: 1937

Website
- Official website

The Sakhalin Regional Museum (Russian: Сахалинский областной краеведческий музей) is a museum in Yuzhno-Sakhalinsk on the Russian island of Sakhalin. It is the largest museum in the Sakhalin Oblast. The Museum collects, researches, and displays materials relating to the natural history, archaeology, history, and ethnography of the region.

== History ==
The first museum on Sakhalin opened in what was then the military post of Alexandrovsk in North Sakhalin in 1896. A number of exhibits disappeared when the area was in Japanese hands, in 1905 and again between 1920 and 1925. The museum reopened in 1932. Meanwhile, in South Sakhalin, in the years when, as Karafuto Prefecture, it formed part of the Empire of Japan, the official residence of the garrison commander initially served for the Karafuto Agency Museum (樺太庁博物館), a situation that lasted until 1935, when the building was repurposed for the Toyohara Military Police.

Construction work on a new, dedicated museum building began in July 1935 and continued for two years, until July 1937; related documentation from the 1935 fiscal year is preserved in the Archives of Hokkaido. For the site, land belonging to Karafuto Jinja was used; a Butokuden or martial arts facility was also built nearby in Japanese-style. In 1937, the Karafuto Agency Museum reopened to the public in what was then the city of Toyohara [ja], now Yuzhno-Sakhalinsk, with displays organized around the three themes of nature, culture, and industry.

After the Soviet invasion of South Sakhalin in August 1945, the Museum changed hands, reopening to the public the following May; for a period, until their repatriation, Japanese staff continued to work alongside their Soviet colleagues. In 1953, the Museum in Alexandrovsk-Sakhalinsky closed and its collections were transferred to the Sakhalin Regional Museum. In 1970, the Museum staged an exhibition of paintings from the Tretyakov Gallery. In the 1980s and 1990s, artworks from the Museum were transferred to and formed the basis of the collection of the new Sakhalin Regional Art Museum, assistance was provided in the establishment of the Chekhov Museum (Yuzhno-Sakhalinsk), and several branch museums were created in other districts of Sakhalin Oblast. (By 2000, there were seven such branch museums; in 2001 these were reestablished as independent museums in their own right.) Since 1990, the Museum has maintained relations with Hokkaido Museum (and its predecessor institution the Historical Museum of Hokkaido) in Sapporo, Japan, including joint research and staff exchanges.

== Building ==
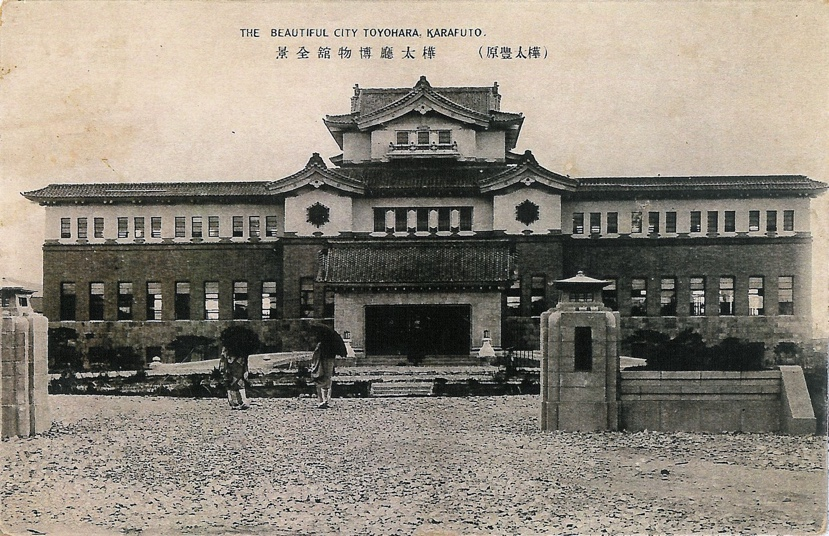
Karafuto Agency Museum in 1937

The Nihon-shumi (日本趣味) or Japonaiserie-style museum building, of reinforced concrete with a tiled roof, is in the Imperial Crown Style, to plans by Kaizuka Yoshio (貝塚良雄) (1900–1974), who sought to combine elements of Japanese castle design with elements of western design. The building has a marked horizontal emphasis, the tenshu-like components provide a strong central accent and give an impression of ascent, while staggered roofs add variety to enliven the façade. While the lower tiers are more western in their inspiration, the cut stone is reminiscent of castle walls, and the white plaster of the upper tiers and onigawara and other decorative features such are thoroughly Japanese. Inside, skylights brighten the upper exhibition spaces with natural light, while cloth wallpaper once softened the acoustic. From 2005, restoration and repair work was carried out on the building.

== Collection and display ==
The permanent display is organized around six main themes: the geology of Sakhalin and the Kuril Islands; their flora and fauna; "ancient cultures and indigenous peoples"; discovery and exploration (from the seventeenth to the nineteenth centuries); "the period of hard labour"; and the first half of the twentieth century. Leading figures documented include Gennady Ivanovich Nevelskoy, Mogami Tokunai, Mamiya Rinzō, Matsuura Takeshirō, Bronisław Piłsudski, and Igor Farkhutdinov, and the local oil and gas industry is also introduced.

The collection includes replicas of local fossil finds, of Nipponosaurus sachalinensis and Desmostylus hesperus; taxidermied representatives of species featured in the Red Data Book of Sakhalin Oblast; materials relating to the Ainu, Nivkh, and Uilta; and one of the four main boundary markers placed in 1906 along the 50th parallel at the time of the demarcation of the Sakhalin frontier following the Treaty of Portsmouth that brought the Russo-Japanese War to its close.

== Gallery ==
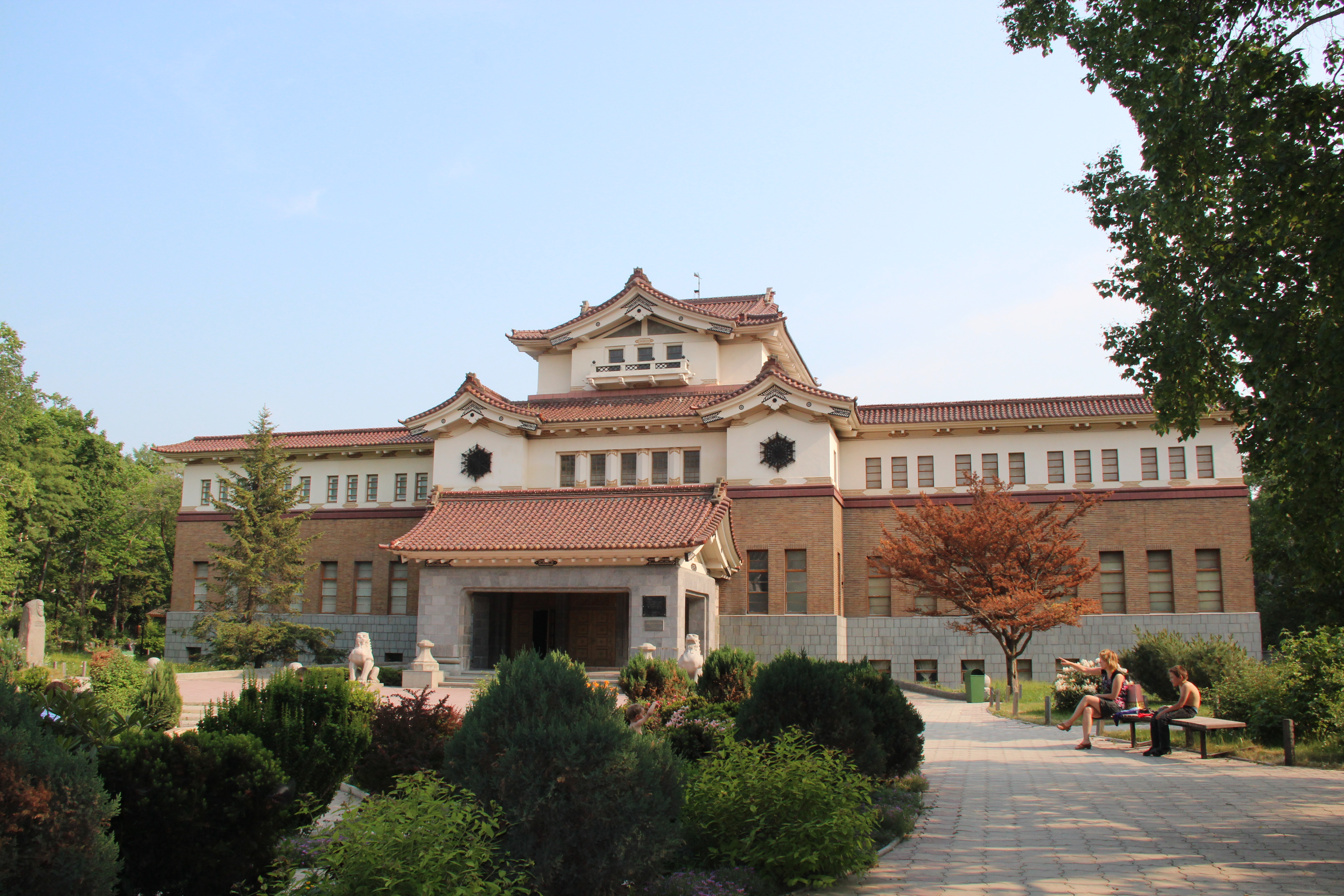
Museum in 2012

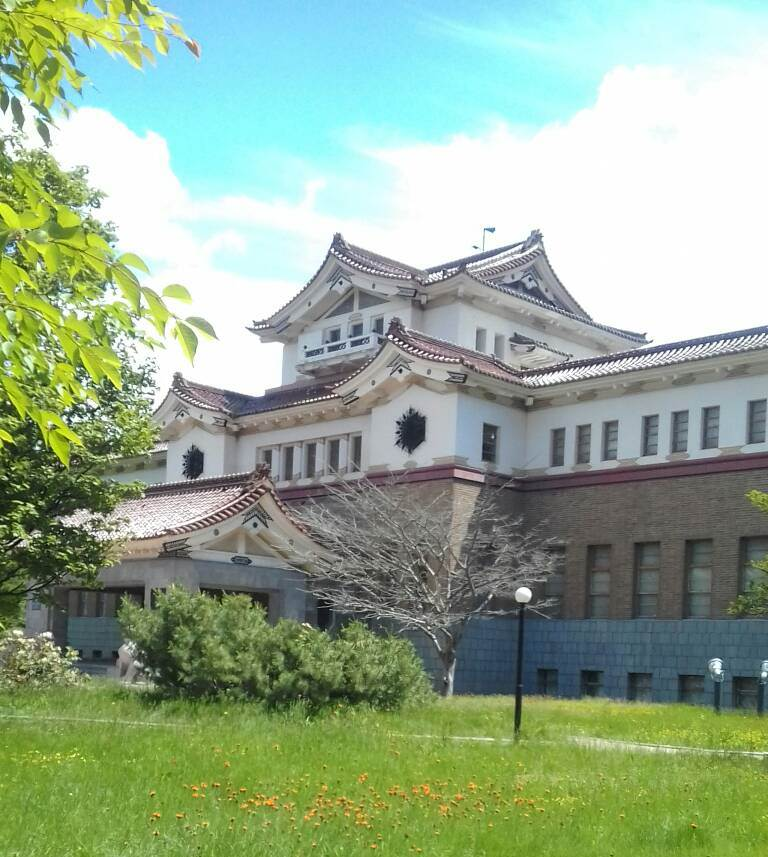
Museum in 2018

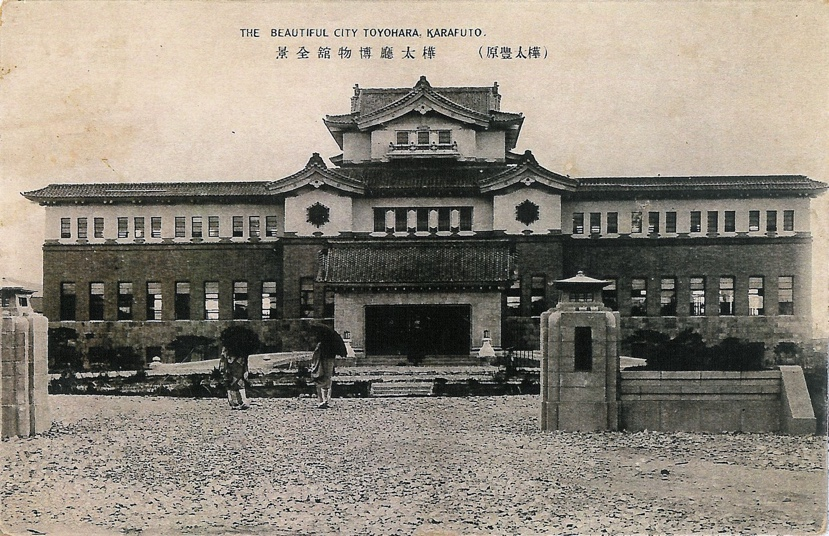
Karafuto Agency Museum (now Sakhalin Regional Museum) in 1937

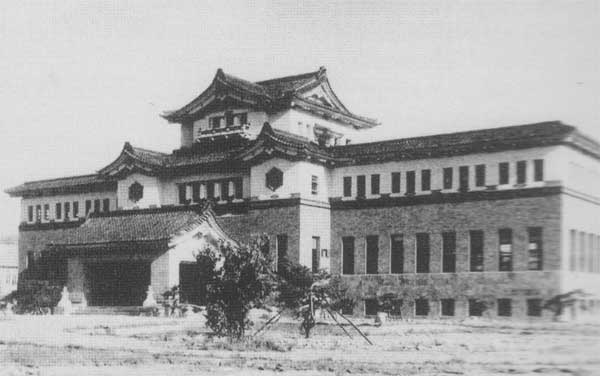
Museum for the display of collections on the natural history of Karafuto in 1937

== See also ==
- Nemuro City Museum of History and Nature
