= Nishikubo Toyoichirō =

Japanese military personnel

- 西久保 豊一郎
- Born: January 7, 1870; Saga Domain, Hizen Province, Japan
- Died: July 12, 1905 (aged 35); Dalnee, Sakhalin, Russian Empire
- Military career
- Branch: Imperial Japanese Army
- Service years: 1889–1905
- Rank: Major (少佐, shōsa)
- Conflicts: First Sino-Japanese War; Russo-Japanese War; Battle of Liaoyang; Japanese invasion of Sakhalin †

Nishikubo Toyoichirō (Japanese: 西久保 豊一郎; 1870–1905) was a Japanese Army officer.

== Early life ==
Nishikubo Toyoichirō was born to police inspector Nishikubo Kirin (西久保 紀林), a former samurai retainer of the Nabeshima clan. His older brother was Nishikubo Hiromichi. In 1874, the family moved to Tokyo.

== Military career ==
Nishikubo began training as an Army cadet in 1886 and graduated from Imperial Japanese Army Academy in 1890. In 1892, Nishikubo was commissioned as a lieutenant of infantry and assigned to the 1st Infantry Regiment. He was accorded the honor of having his work personally inspected by Maj. Gen. Nogi Maresuke. During the First Sino-Japanese War, Nishikubo was deployed to China.

After returning from China in 1896, Nishikubo was assigned to Taiwan before being transferred back to the Japanese mainland several months later. In 1901, he completed a course on marksmanship at the Toyama Army Academy.

In 1904, after the outbreak of the Russo-Japanese War, Nishikubo was deployed to Korea where he served in the vanguard of the 1st Infantry Regiment. On July 18, his buttocks and legs were severely injured by the explosion of a shrapnel shell and he was evacuated back to Japan. He was admitted to an army hospital in Kokura where he recuperated for several months. After being discharged from the hospital on October 5, he was assigned to a unit stationed in Liaoyang. On October 26, Nishikubo suffered a skull fracture when a bullet grazed his head as he was leading an uphill charge against a Russian position on Mt. Waitou (歪頭山) and he was evacuated again to an army hospital in Sendai. While he was recovering in Sendai, he received a visit from an imperial messenger sent by the Empress Shōken. He was discharged in January 1905 and once again returned to service.

On July 3, Nishikubo departed Aomori in command of the 1st Infantry Regiment of the 13th Division. Nishikubo's regiment landed several days later at the village of Mereya (Мерея), near Korsakov on the island of Sakhalin. On July 11, they arrived at the village of Dalnee (Дальнее). Japanese scouts sighted several hundred Russian soldiers encamped in the forest north of the village. Early the next morning, Nishikubo led a charge against the Russian positions under heavy machine gun fire. The Russians were routed and the Japanese won the battle, but Nishikubo was killed instantly when a bullet struck his neck and severed his common carotid artery.

== Legacy ==
Nishikubo's death was reported by telegram from Wakkanai on July 15. He was posthumously awarded the Order of the Rising Sun and the Order of the Golden Kite.

In 1915, Nishikubo Shrine was founded near Toyohara to venerate Nishikubo as a guardian spirit of Karafuto Prefecture. In 1931, a monument was erected on the exact spot where he died. In 1941, a propaganda film titled Northern Lights (北極光, Hokkyokukō) was produced which contained a dramatic depiction of his death.

Nishikubo Shrine was looted and destroyed by the Red Army after the Soviet invasion of South Sakhalin in 1945. According to Igor A. Samarin, the ruins of the shrine were still visible in the early 21st century.

== See also ==
- Shirodasukitai

== Bibliography ==
- 西久保 Nishikubo, 豊一郎 Toyoichirō (1906). 故西久保豊一郎従軍日記 Ko Nishikubo Toyoichirō jūgun nikki (1st ed.). Japan: Published privately.
