= Dahinien Gendānu =

Dahinien Gendānu, also Daxinnieni Geldanu (c. 1926–1984), was an Uilta activist from Sakhalin.

== Life ==
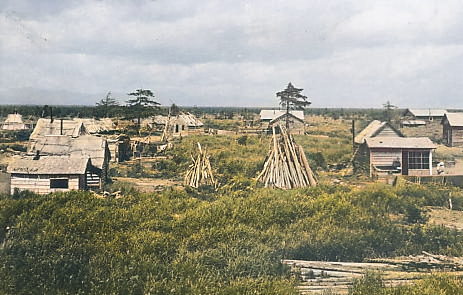
Otasu where Gendānu grew up

Gendānu was the adopted son of Dahinien Gorgolo, an Uilta shaman. Like most members of his people at the time, he was unclear on his exact year of birth. In his childhood, his home village of Otasu was ruled as part of the Karafuto Prefecture of the Japanese Empire. He received the Japanese name Kitagawa Gentaro (北川 源太郎, Kitagawa Gentarō). After the surrender of Japan ended World War II, he was interned in a prisoner-of-war camp in the Soviet Union for seven years. Following his release, he migrated to Japan in 1955. However, his requests for a pension were denied because of the Japanese government's position that Uilta and Nivkh people from Sakhalin were ineligible for armed service and had been illegally recruited. He died in 1984 without pension or compensation from the Japanese government.

== Legacy ==
In Abashiri, Hokkaidō, Gendānu established a museum of the indigenous peoples of Sakhalin, the Jakka Dukhuni, meaning "keeping place of treasures". His autobiography was published in 1978, in collaboration with Ryō Tanaka, a high school teacher in Abashiri. His niece Lyuba Nakagawa had remained on Sakhalin. In 1995, she visited Tokyo as an emissary to request Japanese government assistance in constructing a memorial to Uilta war dead, as well as other compensation and support; however, she received no response. Tanaka would go on to become the president of the Uilta Association, the Uilta rights association which Gendānu founded. The Uilta language data elicited from Gendānu and his father by Fumio Koizumi would form the basis of later linguistic studies by Shirō Ikegami and Toshirō Shimagari.

== Works ==
- 田中了 (Tanaka Ryō); D. ゲンダーヌ [D. Gendānu] (1978), ゲンダーヌ : ある北方少数民族のドラマ [Gendanu: Drama of a northern minority], 現代史出版会 [Gendai Shuppankai], OCLC 24385988
