= Takobeya labor =

Historic form of labor in Japan

Takobeya labor (Japanese: タコ部屋労働; lit. Tako room labor) was a form of labor found in Japan from the 1880s to the 1940s. It was characterized by inhumane working conditions, physical confinement, and severe manual labor. It is most commonly associated with labor camps in Hokkaido, though the practice was also found in Karafuto Prefecture. It has similarities with the bunkhouse system concurrently found in Kyushu's coalmines, such as the Chikuhō coalfield. In 1947, the practice would be banned under article 5 of the Labor Standards Act.

In Japanese, usage of the term Takobeya has persisted to the present day. Poverty businesses which entrap people in hostels, dormitories, and capsule hotels that exceed single-room occupancies, lack emergency directions, and abuse the victims' welfare benefits, have also been referred to as Takobeya.

== Origins ==
=== Etymology ===
There is uncertainty as to where the phrase Takobeya originated. Various etymologies have been proposed, with most deriving from the Japanese word for octopus (タコ) or its homonyms:

1. The way in which laborers would remain stuck in camps indefinitely was likened to how an octopus (蛸) would remain stuck to a rock until it died.
2. Laborers would sacrifice their bodies piece by piece, akin to how an octopus will eat its own limbs when facing starvation.
3. Workers from other regions, primarily northern Tohoku, were lured by recruiters into coming north for work. (他雇 lit. 'Outside employee' )
4. Workers attempted to escape as if they were kites (凧) with their strings cut.
5. The tightness of the rooms were likened to that of an octopus trap.
6. Working without clothes, laborers had their skin redden to the point where it resembled that of an octopus.

=== Prison labor ===
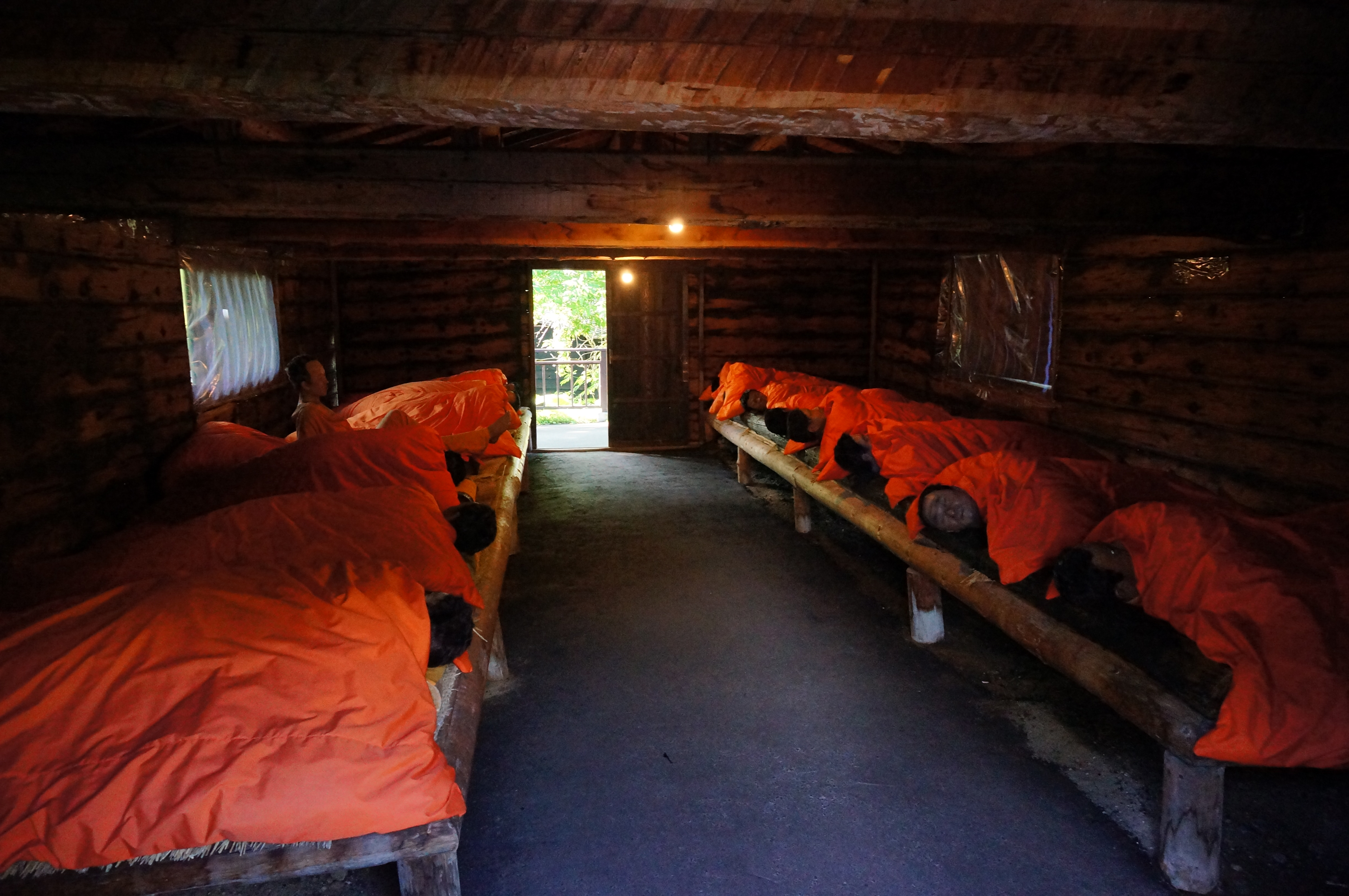
A replica of Hokkaido prisoners' lodging in 1891, exhibited at the Abashiri Prison museum.

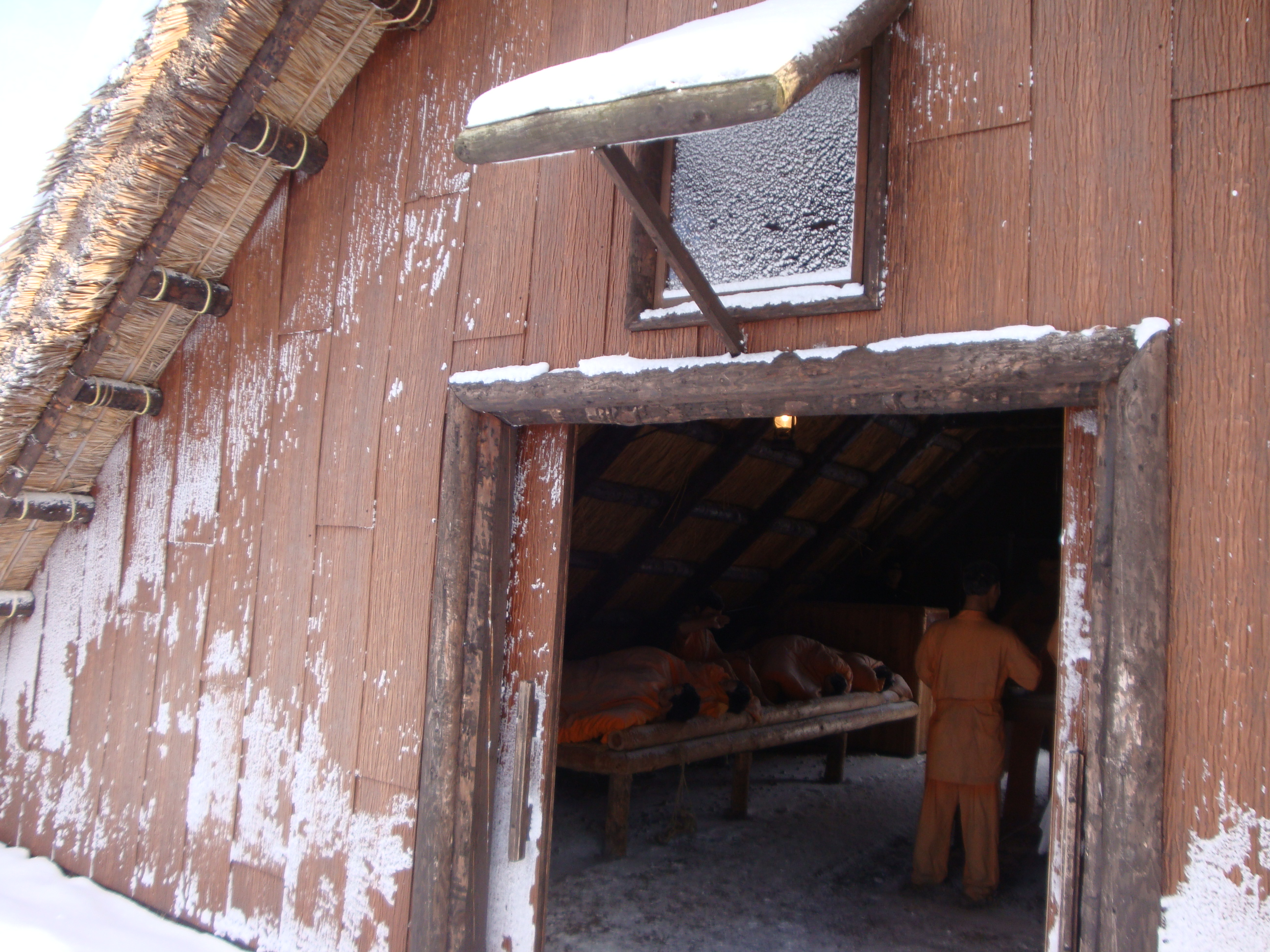
The exterior of the building.

Following the Meiji Restoration, Japanese settlement and development of Hokkaido would be accomplished with the use of prison labor.

By the late 1880s, the construction of roads and railroads became a necessity for Japan's development. In Hokkaido, Tondenhei were insufficient as a labor force. These labor deficiencies would be filled by convicts from penal colonies in Tsukigata and Kitami (later the site of Abashiri Prison).

These prisoners would engage in construction work. There would also be chain gangs in which prisoners worked on roads and in mines during heavy snowfall. Those discovered to be planning escapes would be lynched to deter other prisoners.

The huts where the prisoners would reside would be locked and monitored by a guard. A large log would function as their pillow, and would be tapped by the guard to wake up the prisoners. The mistreatment of prisoners and the severity of their labor would come under public scrutiny, and finally result in the abolishment of prison labor in Japan in 1894.

=== After the abolition of prison labor ===
Private concerns would fill in the gap left by the absence of prison labor. Nonetheless, a chronic labor shortage would persist from the 1890s onwards due to the volume of engineering projects undertaken in Hokkaido.

These persistent shortages would result in the appearance of the "Tako labor" system, in which laborers from Honshu would relocate to labor camps in mountainous and remote areas. They would be semi-forcibly enlisted into various civil engineering projects such as river improvement and the construction of roads and railroads.

The practice is considered to have begun in 1890, with the Hokkaido Colliery and Railway Company's construction of the Muroran Line. This project had similar conditions to the prison labor of years prior.

As these harsh conditions persisted, the first and second Hokkaido Development Plans from 1910 and 1927 both referred to these labor camps as "Hokkaido's hell rooms."

== Living conditions ==
A foreman served as the head of a labor site, with various supervisors and managers as subordinates. To make relocation more convenient, the quarters at worksites would be simple, single-story structures. With rough pine logs acting as supports, and thatched roofs made from wood shingles and white birch bark, and dirt floors. They would also contain kiosks selling daily necessities and the foreman's quarters. With the exception of small, thin windows, the only exit was a counter akin to those found in public bathhouses of the time, in which a night watchman monitored a sliding door with a bell, locked from the outside to prevent any workers from escaping.

Typically, the quarters would lack daylight and ventilation, creating a dim, inhospitable environment for the roughly 70 workers which the lodgings typically held.

Following the establishment of the Hokkaido Workers Colonization Association in 1932, laborers' quarters in Hokkaido could broadly be split into two categories. The first was the "trust room" (信用部屋), in which laborers could live by their own volition, without coercion, and the Takobeya, which was more common. Workers would be procured by brokers known as "ponbiki." Upon their recruitment, they would be confined for the duration of their contract, typically six months. In addition to illegal confinement, overwork, assault, and other abuses were daily occurrences.

Within the Takobeya system itself, stratification into three classes occurred on an informal basis. Group leaders and those above them ate seated in a different room while ordinary workers ate standing up. Exemplary workers were promoted into a middle class that allowed them to eat while seated.

== Working conditions ==
Contracts typically lasted from three to six months due to Hokkaido's winter climate halting work. Worksites would be characterized by severe physical labor from early morning to late night, with frequent corporal punishment over the course of the workday.

Wages were paid daily. Food and drink were deducted from pay, and laborers could only purchase goods from the camp itself, leaving them with a very small amount of income. Escapees who were caught would be subject to torture, ranging from being bound, beaten, and being stripped naked and left outside to be attacked by mosquitos and horseflies.

Meals were insufficient, and conditions were unsanitary. These factors combined with physical confinement resulted in thiamine deficiency, as well as the spread of tuberculosis and malaria. No medical treatment was offered for these ailments, and workers afflicted by them were buried alive. Laborers who died while working were often left unburied.

These appalling conditions spurred some laborers to attempt murders while working in the presence of authorities, in the hopes that their arrest would send them to prison.

Due to Takobeya being located in remote, mountainous areas, even successful escapes could result in death. Those who succeeded in returning would face discrimination from the general public and severe poverty. With some facing no choice but to return to Takobeya.

Despite engaging in extreme exploitation of their workers, the profits for those running Takobeya were small. This was due to most Takobeya being subcontracted by larger companies who bribed politicians and had to finance the collusion of middlemen. The siphoning of these profits gradually absorbed all income made from the projects themselves. The unsustainability of this structure was one factor contributing to the decline of Takobeya labor.

== The laborers ==
While many participants in Takobeya labor were unemployed or impoverished farmers, various strata of Japanese society could fall victim to it, particularly due to deceptive recruiting practices promising easy work. During the Great Depression, it was not uncommon for university students, graduates, and other members of Japan's intelligentsia to be deceived into Takobeya labor in the hopes of work that would pay off their tuition.

As Japan's colonial empire grew, its occupied peoples such as Koreans would also end up in the Takobeya system. They would make up a greater proportion of the Takobeya labor force following the passing of the State General Mobilization Law in 1938.

Some workers made Takobeya labor their livelihood, moving from camp to camp across Japan. Among these professional Takobeya laborers, it was common for them to spend their pay extravagantly on geisha and other nightlife activities. The knowledge these Takobeya laborers accumulated over years of experience gave some the wherewithal to escape particularly grueling camps. In Japan's post-war years, some of these laborers made names for themselves in the civil engineering and construction industries.

== Decline ==
From the late Taishō to the early Shōwa era, Labor movements in Japan arose to liberate workers in Takobeya, and improve working conditions overall. In 1932, Hokkaido's local government worked in conjunction with private construction firms to create the Hokkaido Labor Colonization Association. However, political pressures prevented labor conditions from actually improving. The presence of Takobeya labor increased during World War II despite increased attempts by authorities to prevent it. Collusion between politicians and contractors meant that Takobeya labor would persist until the end of the war.

Takobeya labor would be formally banned during the post-war occupation of Japan. On October 2 1946, The Asahi Shimbun published an editorial titled "Eliminate prison-room labor immediately", stating that the continued existence of this form of labor hindered Japan's democratization. At the same time, Japan's labor movement emerged from wartime suppression, with workers obtaining legal rights. The importing of heavy equipment drastically reduced the requirements for physical labor as well.

Illegal worksites would persist in spite of these changes, particularly with laborers in debt bondage. Nonetheless, usage of Takobeya labor would continue to decline during Japanese economic miracle. Enforcement of the Labor Standards Act and laws against organized crime have made traditional Takobeya labor practically impossible.

=== Modern developments ===
In recent years "enclosure agents" (囲い屋) have appeared, which facilitate welfare fraud for recipients who are ineligible. These agents then confine them to apartments or hotels to steal said payments. In 2016, Ryosuke Nagata, a victim of one of these services, described his experiences and legal battles in a nonfiction book.

Due to this, various local governments in Japan have enacted laws regulating poverty businesses.

== Structures created using Takobeya labor ==
- Jumon Tunnel（石北本線）- The tunnel's association with Takobeya labor resulted in it being the subject of ghost stories. In 1970, the remains of over 50 people were discovered on the side of the tunnel towards Kanehana Station. In addition, the remains of a worker who had suffered a skull fracture was discovered during construction of the tunnel's emergency shelter. There is a memorial near the tunnel for the workers who lost their lives.
- Uryu Line（Later Shinmei Line）
- Uryu Dam – Has a memorial honoring the workers who lost their lives during the construction of the dam and its associated railroad. Additionally, there is forced labor museum in its vicinity.
- Koshikawa Bridge – Resulted in the deaths of 11 workers
- Nemuro Tunnel (formerly used by the Nemuro Main Line）
- Oboro Tunnel (also on the Nemuro Main Line)
- Moiwa Power Plant (Sapporo) – A hydroelectric plant harnessing the Toyohira River. Contains a memorial honoring its workers.
- Asajino Airfield（Sarufutsu）
- Toi Line（Hakodate）- Used a Takobeya consisting of 30 workers.

In Hokkaido, mines, highways, railroads, dams, tunnels, irrigation channels and other construction projects were completed using Takobeya labor.

== Incidents involving Takobeya labor ==
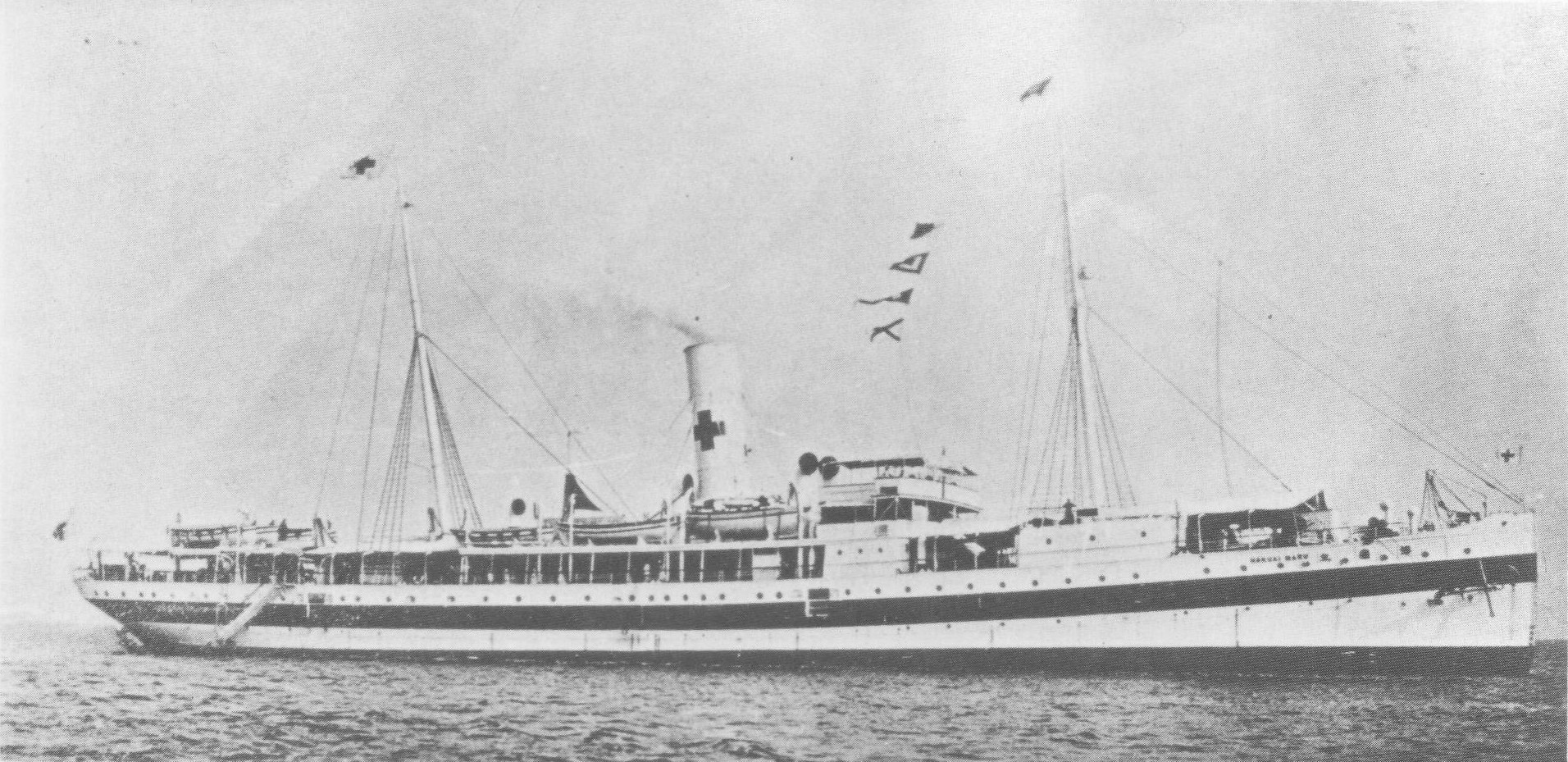
The Hakuaimaru, pictured here as a hospital ship. By 1926, it would become a crab processing vessel notorious for its cruel working conditions.

- Noda Soy Sauce Labor Dispute (1922–1928)
- Shinano River incident (July 1922)
- Hakuaimaru Incident (1926)
- Hanaoka Incident (June 1945)
- Yamanashi Campground Murder Case (1997–2003)

== In fiction ==
=== Novels ===
- Ryuuto Numata: Moan of Blood (1923)
- Mondo Hashi: Prison Room (1926)
- Takiji Kobayashi: Kani Kōsen (1929)

=== Manga ===
- Tetsuya Chiba: Otokotachi (January 1982 – July 1983), Comic Morning
- Nobuyuki Fukumoto: Kaiji
- Shohei Manabe: Ushijima the Loan Shark

== See also ==
- Aso Mining forced labor controversy
- Iriomote Coal Mine
- Black company (Japan)
- Working poor
- Scam center
- Human trafficking
- Truck wages
