= Ushimaro Sawada =

Japanese politician

- 沢田 牛麿
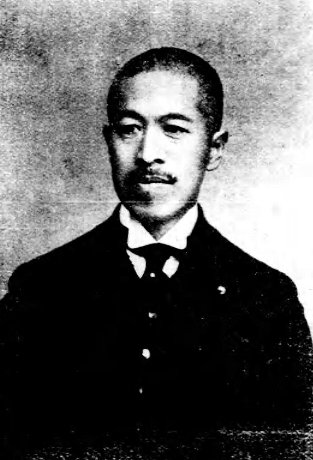
- Sawada, before 1922

Member of the House of Peers
- In office 28 August 1939 – 2 May 1947 Nominated by the Emperor

19th Director-General of the Hokkaidō Agency
- In office 30 April 1927 – 5 July 1929
- Monarch: Hirohito
- Preceded by: Kenzō Nakagawa
- Succeeded by: Hideo Ikeda
Gubernatorial offices
Governor of Fukuoka Prefecture
In office 6 October 1922 – 25 November 1923
Monarch	Taishō
Preceded by	Yasukouchi Asakichi
Succeeded by	Shibata Zenzaburō
Governor of Ishikawa Prefecture
In office 3 June 1921 – 16 October 1922
Monarch	Taishō
Preceded by	Kahei Toki
Succeeded by	Jiro Yamagata
Governor of Saga Prefecture
In office 18 April 1919 – 3 June 1921
Monarch	Taishō
Preceded by	Ōshiba Sōkichi
Succeeded by	Kō Tominaga
Governor of Aomori Prefecture
In office 3 October 1918 – 18 April 1919
Monarch	Taishō
Preceded by	Kawamura Takeji
Succeeded by	Hidehiko Michioka

Personal details
- Born: 6 February 1874 Tosa, Kōchi, Japan
- Died: 29 January 1958 (aged 83)

Ushimaro Sawada (沢田 牛麿, Sawada Ushimaro; 6 February 1874 – 29 January 1958) was a Japanese bureaucrat and politician who served as Governor of Aomori Prefecture, Governor of Saga Prefecture, Governor of Ishikawa Prefecture, Governor of Fukuoka Prefecture, 19th Director-General of the Hokkaidō Agency, and later as a member of the House of Peers.

== Career ==
By the early twentieth century he had already entered government service. He served as an Army Ministry councillor, as a professor at the Police and Prison School concurrently with service as a Home Ministry councillor, as a Tokyo prefectural official transferred to the post of Resident-General's police official in Korea, and later as a Resident-General's secretary and as a Kagoshima prefectural official.

Sawada later moved into senior prefectural office such as Governor of Aomori Prefecture in 1918 and Governor of Saga Prefecture in 1921. On 3 June 1921, after Governor Toki Kahei transferred to the Kwantung Government, Sawada was appointed Governor of Ishikawa Prefecture. He was then Governor of Fukuoka Prefecture before his becoming Director-General of the Hokkaidō Agency.

Sawada became the 19th Director-General of the Hokkaidō Agency on 30 April 1927 and remained in office until 5 July 1929. In that role he was also appointed as a government delegate for matters relating to individual ministries.

By the closing years of the pre-war system Sawada was serving in the House of Peers.
