= Akira Sakaya =

Japanese politician (1870–1946)

- 昌谷 彰
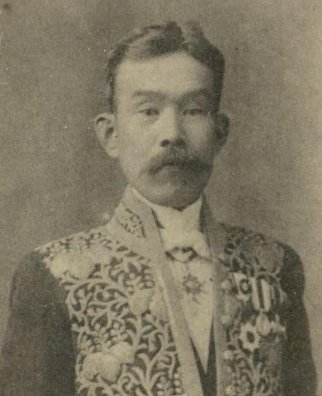

Director of the Karafuto Agency
- In office 11 June 1924 – 5 August 1926
- Monarch: Taishō
- Preceded by: Kinjirō Nagai
- Succeeded by: Katsuzō Toyota
- In office 13 October 1916 – 17 April 1919
- Monarch: Taishō
- Preceded by: Bunji Okada
- Succeeded by: Kinjirō Nagai

Governor of Saitama Prefecture
- In office 9 June 1914 – 13 October 1916
- Monarch: Taishō
- Preceded by: Keiichirō Soeda
- Succeeded by: Tadahiko Okada

Governor of Ōita Prefecture
- In office 4 July 1911 – 1 June 1913
- Monarchs: Meiji; Taishō
- Preceded by: Teikan Chiba
- Succeeded by: Hikoharu Kawaguchi

Personal details
- Born: 13 February 1870 Tsuyama, Mimasaka, Japan
- Died: October 1946 (aged 76)
- Education: First Higher School
- Alma mater: Tokyo Imperial University

Akira Sakaya (昌谷 彰, Sakaya Akira; 13 February 1870 – October 1946) was a Director of the Karafuto Agency from 1916 to 1919, and from 1924 to 1926. He was governor of Ōita (1911–1913) and Saitama Prefecture (1914–1916). He was a graduate of the University of Tokyo.

Preceded by	Governor of Saitama Prefecture; 1914-1916	Succeeded by Tadahiko Okada
Preceded by Bunji Okada	Director of the Karafuto Agency; 1916–1919	Succeeded by Kinjirō Nagai
Preceded by Kinjirō Nagai	Director of the Karafuto Agency; 1924–1926	Succeeded by Katsuzō Toyota
