= Kinjirō Nagai =

Japanese government official and mayor

- 永井 金次郎
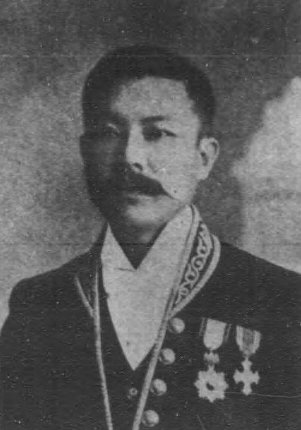

Director of the Karafuto Agency
- In office 17 April 1919 – 11 June 1924
- Monarch: Taishō
- Preceded by: Akira Sakaya
- Succeeded by: Akira Sakaya

Mayor of Otaru
- In office January 1917 – April 1919
- Preceded by: Watanabe Hyōshirō
- Succeeded by: Ōmi Kyūgorō

Governor of Kōchi Prefecture
- In office 29 June 1913 – 9 June 1914
- Monarch: Taishō
- Preceded by: Shigorō Sugiyama
- Succeeded by: Kahei Toki

Personal details
- Born: 3 May 1874 Niigata Prefecture, Japan
- Died: 3 April 1927 (aged 52)
- Resting place: Tama Cemetery
- Party: Rikken Seiyūkai
- Education: Tokyo College of Law

Kinjiro Nagai (Japanese: 永井金次郎; 3 May 1874 – 3 April 1927) was the director of the Karafuto Agency (17 April 1919 – 11 June 1924). He was also the mayor of Otaru and Governor of Kōchi Prefecture (1913–1914).

== Bibliography ==
- 歴代知事編纂会編『新編日本の歴代知事』歴代知事編纂会、1991年。
- 秦郁彦編『日本官僚制総合事典：1868 - 2000』東京大学出版会、2001年。
- 『「現代物故者事典」総索引 : 昭和元年～平成23年 1 (政治・経済・社会篇)』日外アソシエーツ株式会社、2012年。
  Preceded by Akira Sakaya	Director of the Karafuto Agency; 1919–1924	Succeeded by Akira Sakaya
