= Sadatarō Hiraoka =

- 平岡 定太郎
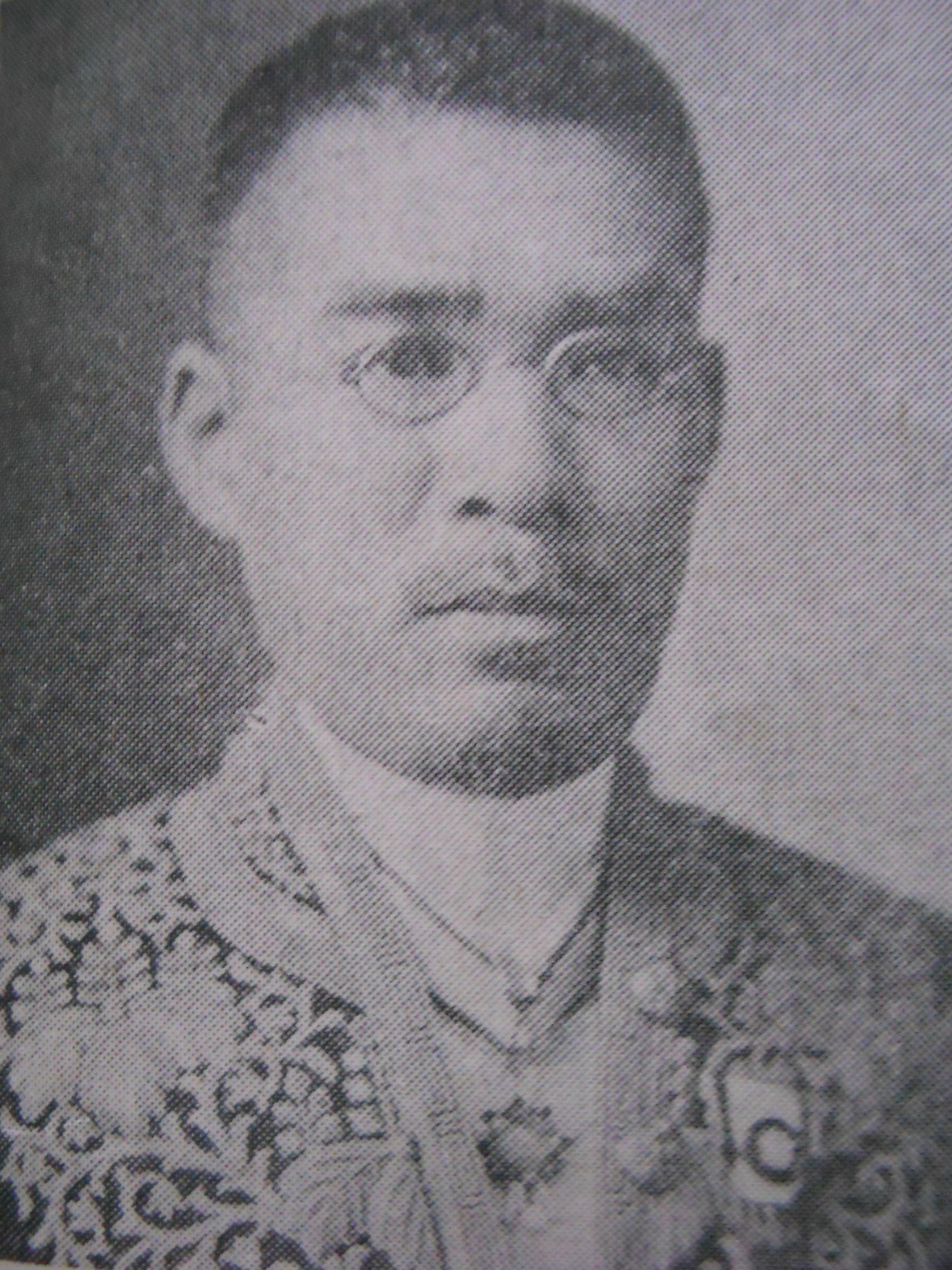
- Hiraoka, c. 1908

Director of the Karafuto Agency
- In office 12 June 1908 – 5 June 1914
- Monarchs: Meiji; Taishō
- Preceded by: Tokonami Takejirō
- Succeeded by: Bunji Okada

Governor of Fukushima Prefecture
- In office 28 July 1906 – 12 June 1908
- Monarch: Meiji
- Preceded by: Arita Yoshisuke
- Succeeded by: Nishizawa Shōtarō

Personal details
- Born: 19 July 1863 Kakogawa, Harima, Japan
- Died: 26 August 1942 (aged 79) Yotsuya, Tokyo, Japan
- Resting place: Tama Cemetery
- Spouse: Natsu Nagai (m. 1893; died 1939)
- Relatives: Yukio Mishima (grandson)
- Education: Tokyo Imperial University

Sadatarō Hiraoka (Japanese: 平岡定太郎; 19 July 1863 – 26 August 1942)was the third Director of Karafuto Prefecture (11 June 1908 – 3 June 1914), and the 17th governor of Fukushima Prefecture (1906–1908). He was from Harima Province, and was a graduate of Tokyo Imperial University. Yukio Mishima was his grandchild.

Preceded by Takejirō Tokonami	Director of Karafuto Prefecture; 1908–1914	Succeeded by Bunji Okada
