= Masao Kishimoto =

Japanese government official and governor

- 岸本 正雄
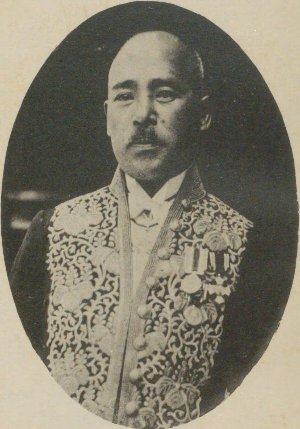

Director of the Karafuto Agency
- In office 17 December 1931 – 5 July 1932
- Monarch: Hirohito
- Preceded by: Shinobu Agata
- Succeeded by: Takeshi Imamura
Gubernatorial offices
Governor of Hiroshima Prefecture
In office 25 May 1928 – 5 July 1929
Monarch	Hirohito
Preceded by	Sukenari Yokoyama
Succeeded by	Hiroshi Kawabuchi
Governor of Okayama Prefecture
In office 17 May 1927 – 25 May 1928
Monarch	Hirohito
Preceded by	Shin'ichi Sagami
Succeeded by	Chōji Minabe
Governor of Yamagata Prefecture
In office 24 June 1924 – 17 December 1924
Monarch	Taishō
Preceded by	Shinobu Agata
Succeeded by	Jitsuo Miura
Governor of Akita Prefecture
In office 16 October 1922 – 18 June 1924
Monarch	Taishō
Preceded by	Yoshitatsu Nao
Succeeded by	Ikeda Hideo

Personal details
- Born: 19 October 1881 Tottori Prefecture, Japan
- Died: 20 May 1963 (aged 81)
- Party: Rikken Seiyūkai
- Education: Tokyo Imperial University

Masao Kishimoto (Japanese: 岸本正雄) (19 October 1881 – 20 May 1963) was Director of the Karafuto Agency (17 December 1931 – 5 July 1932). He was Governor of Akita Prefecture (1922–1924), Yamagata Prefecture (1924), Okayama Prefecture (1927–1928) and Hiroshima Prefecture (1928–1929).

Preceded by Shinobu Agata	Director of the Karafuto Agency; 1931–1932	Succeeded by Takeshi Imamura
Preceded by Sukenari Yokoyama	Governor of Hiroshima Prefecture; 1928–1929	Succeeded by Hiroshi Kawabuchi

== Bibliography ==
- 歴代知事編纂会編『新編日本の歴代知事』歴代知事編纂会、1991年。
- 秦郁彦編『日本官僚制総合事典：1868 - 2000』東京大学出版会、2001年。
- 『「現代物故者事典」総索引 : 昭和元年～平成23年 1 (政治・経済・社会篇)』日外アソシエーツ株式会社、2012年。
- 人事興信所編『人事興信録』第8版、1928年。
