= Kahei Toki =

Japanese politician

- 土岐 嘉平
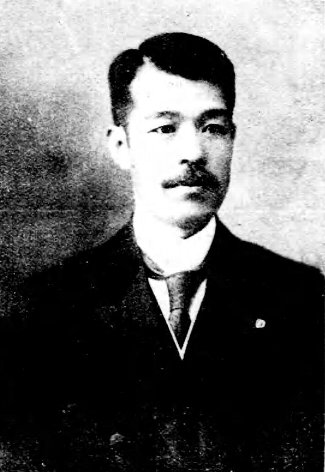
- Toki, before 1922

10th Mayor of Kyoto
- In office 13 December 1927 – 12 December 1931
- Preceded by: Mitsue Ichimura
- Succeeded by: Shigeru Morita

17th Director-General of the Hokkaidō Agency
- In office 29 September 1923 – 16 September 1925
- Monarch: Taishō
- Preceded by: Shunji Miyao
- Succeeded by: Kenzō Nakagawa

2nd Chief Secretary of the Kwantung Government
- In office 3 June 1921 – 15 June 1923
- Governors-General: Yamagata Isaburō; Ijūin Hikokichi
- Preceded by: Shigorō Sugiyama
- Succeeded by: Hikoji Kawaguchi
Gubernatorial offices
Governor of Osaka Prefecture
In office 15 June 1923 – 29 September 1923
Monarch	Taishō
Preceded by	Kosai Inoue
Succeeded by	Nozomu Nakagawa
Governor of Ishikawa Prefecture
In office 13 October 1916 – 3 June 1921
Monarch	Taishō
Preceded by	Ōta Masahiro
Succeeded by	Ushimaro Sawada
Governor of Kōchi Prefecture
In office 9 June 1914 – 13 October 1916
Monarch	Taishō
Preceded by	Kinjirō Nagai
Succeeded by	Takeo Kakinuma

Personal details
- Born: 16 February 1875 Iwade, Wakayama, Japan
- Died: 22 March 1946 (aged 71)
- Education: Tokyo Imperial University

Kahei Toki (土岐 嘉平, Toki Kahei; 16 February 1875 – 22 March 1946) was a Japanese bureaucrat and politician. A career official of the Home Ministry, he served as governor of Kochi Prefecture, Ishikawa Prefecture, and Osaka, as Chief Secretary of the Kwantung Government, as the 17th Director-General of the Hokkaidō Agency, and later as the 10th Mayor of Kyoto.

== Early life and education ==
Toki was born in Wakayama Prefecture in February 1875. He studied political science at Tokyo Imperial University and, while still a student in 1898, passed the judicial appointment examination and was appointed a judicial probationer. He left the judiciary in 1899, opened a law practice, and graduated from Tokyo Imperial University in 1901.

== Career ==
After entering government service, Toki served as a prefectural official and later as an official of the Home Ministry. He served as a councillor in Yamagata Prefecture from 1903, entered the Home Ministry's Civil Engineering Bureau in 1904, and later held senior posts including Home Ministry secretary, councillor, and head of the internal affairs department of Osaka Prefecture.

He became governor of Kochi Prefecture in June 1914 and remained in office until October 1916. He was then appointed governor of Ishikawa Prefecture where he remained in office until June 1921.

From 3 June 1921 to 15 June 1923, Toki served as Chief Secretary of the Kwantung Government. He then returned to Japan and briefly served as governor of Osaka from 15 June 1923 to 29 September 1923.

On 29 September 1923, Toki became the 17th Director-General of the Hokkaidō Agency, serving until 16 September 1925. He then became mayor of Kyoto serveing as the 10th mayor from 13 December 1927 to 12 December 1931. He opened of the central wholesale market, the introduction of city bus operations, and the holding of the Great Kyoto Exposition.

== Personal life ==
He was also an author writing works such as Zaiseigaku (Public Finance).
