= Japanese archipelago =

Archipelago off the coast of Northeast Asia

Japanese Archipelago
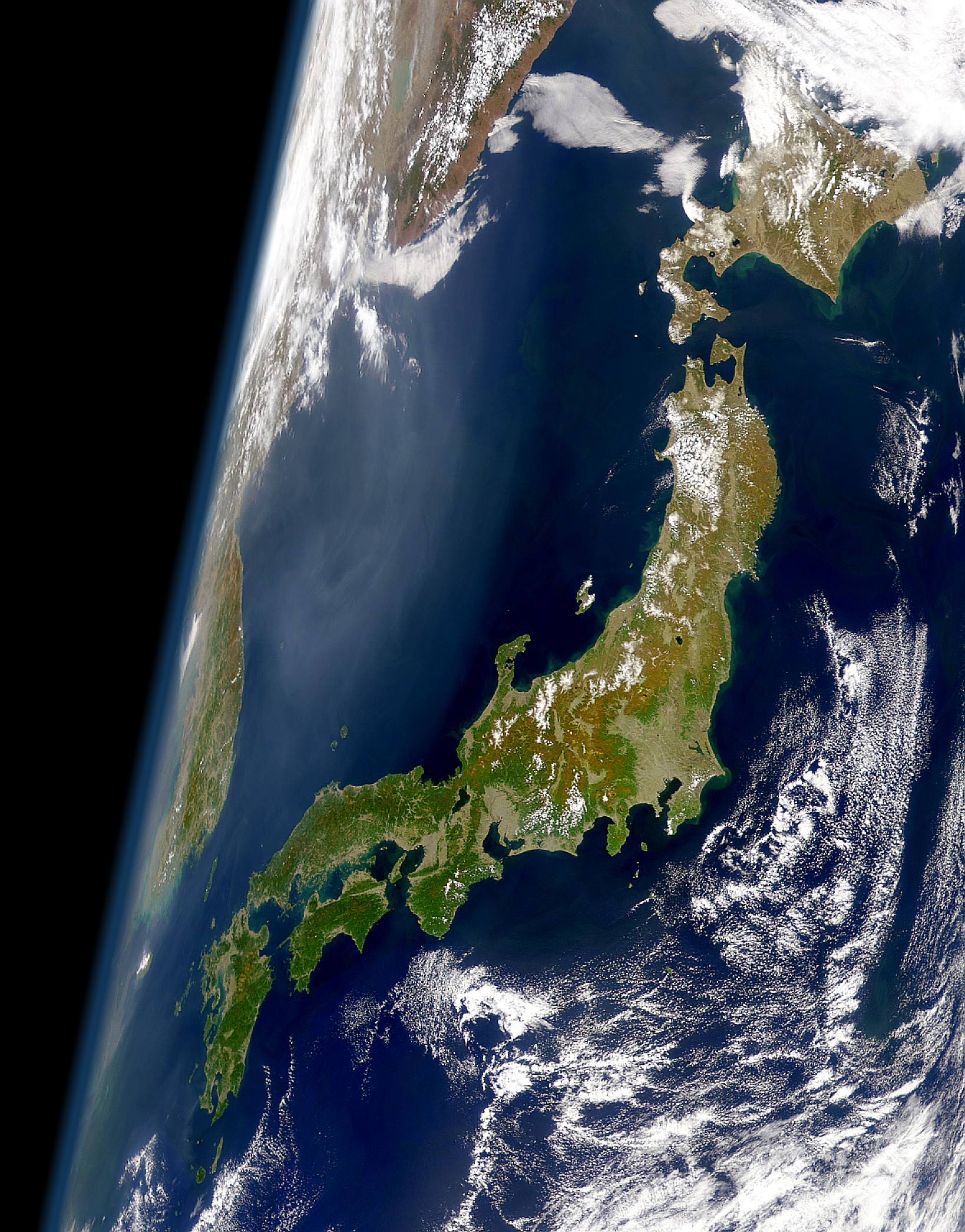
- A satellite image of the main archipelago (Ryukyu Islands and South Kuril Islands not pictured)
- Interactive map of Japanese Archipelago

Geography
- Coordinates: 36°N 138°E
- Area: 377,975 km^{2} (145,937 sq mi)

Administration
- Japan

Japanese archipelago

Japanese name
- Kanji: 日本列島
Transcriptions
- Revised Hepburn: Nippon/Nihon Rettō
- Kunrei-shiki: Nippon/Nihon Rettô

Chinese name
- Traditional Chinese: 日本列島
- Simplified Chinese: 日本列岛
Transcriptions
Standard Mandarin
- Hanyu Pinyin: Rìběn lièdao
Yue: Cantonese
- Yale Romanization: Jat^{6} bun^{2} lit^{6} dou^{2}

Korean name
- Hangul: 일본 열도
- Hanja: 日本列島
Transcriptions
- Revised Romanization: Ilbon yeoldo
- McCune–Reischauer: Ilbon yŏlto

The Japanese archipelago (Japanese: 日本列島, Hepburn: Nippon/Nihon Rettō; Japanese pronunciation: [ɲip.pon/ɲi.hon ɾeꜜt.toː]) is an archipelago of 14,125 islands that constitute the sovereign state of Japan. It spans over 3,000 km (1,900 mi) from the Sea of Okhotsk in the northeast to the East China and Philippine seas in the southwest along the Pacific coast of the Eurasian continent, and consists of three island arcs from north to south: the Northeastern Japan Arc, the Southwestern Japan Arc, and the Ryukyu Island Arc. The Daitō Islands, the Izu–Bonin–Mariana Arc, and the Kuril Islands neighbor the archipelago.

Japan is the largest island country in East Asia and the fourth-largest island country in the world with 377,975.24 km^{2} (145,937.06 sq mi). It has an exclusive economic zone of 4,470,000 km^{2} (1,730,000 mi^{2}).

== Terminology ==
The term "Mainland Japan" is used to distinguish the large islands of the Japanese archipelago from the remote, smaller islands; it refers to the main islands of Hokkaido, Honshu, Kyushu, and Shikoku. From 1943 until the end of the Pacific War, Karafuto Prefecture (south Sakhalin) was designated part of the mainland. Geographically speaking the term "mainland" is somewhat inaccurate, as this refers to an expanse of territory that is attached to a continental landmass.

The term "home islands" was an exonym used at the end of World War II to define the area where Japanese sovereignty and constitutional rule of its emperor would be restricted. The term is also commonly used today to distinguish the archipelago from Japan's colonies and other territories.

== Paleogeography ==
Changes of land-forms of Japan over time
Japanese archipelago, Sea of Japan and surrounding part of continental East Asia in Early Miocene (23–18 Ma)

Japanese archipelago, Sea of Japan and surrounding part of continental East Asia in Middle Pliocene to Late Pliocene (3.5–2 Ma)

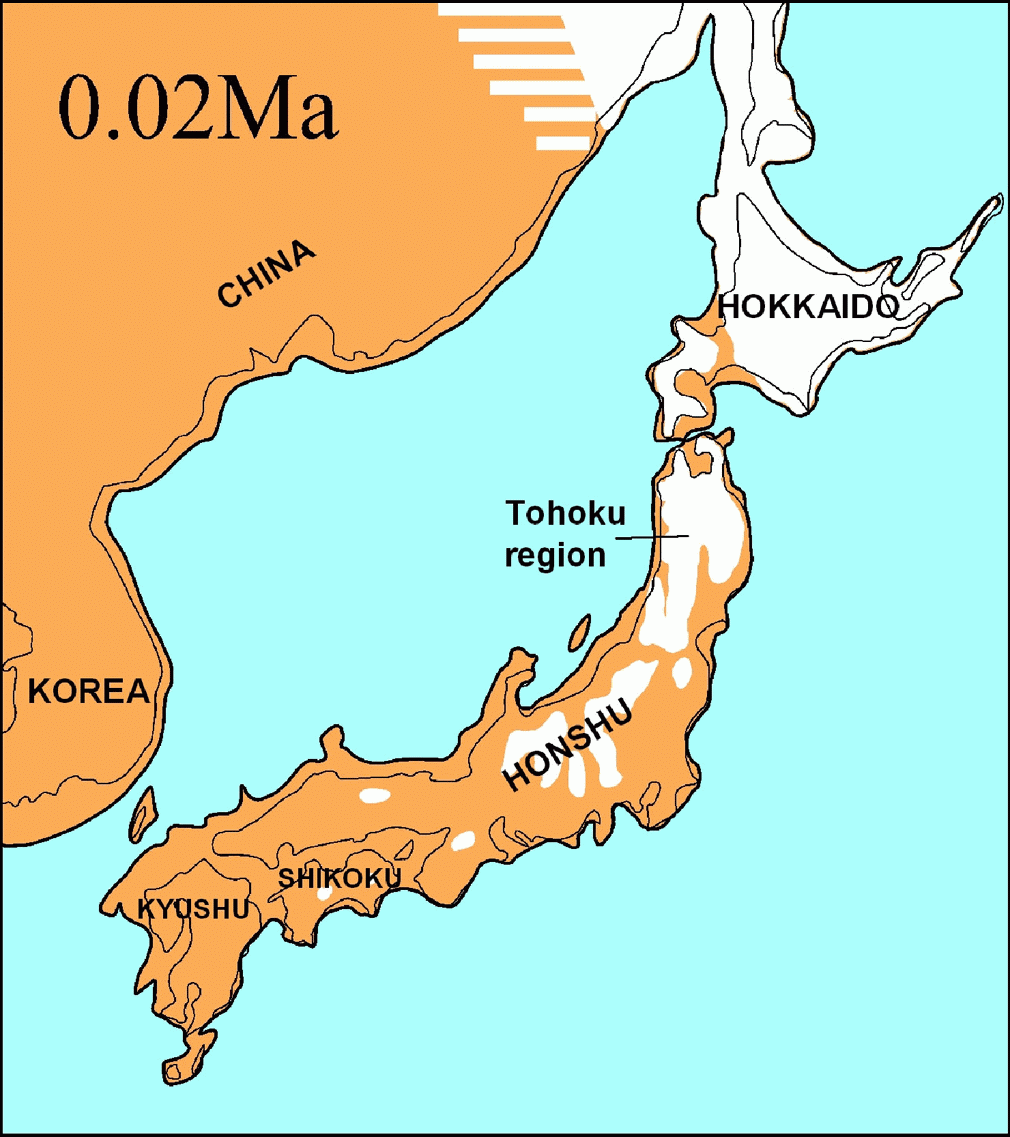
Japanese archipelago at the Last Glacial Maximum about 20,000 years ago, thin black line indicates present-day shorelines:
Vegetated land
Unvegetated land
Ocean

== Geography ==
The archipelago consists of 14,125 islands (here defined as land more than 100 m in circumference), of which 430 are inhabited. The five main islands, from north to south, are Hokkaido, Honshu, Shikoku, Kyushu, and Okinawa. Honshu is the largest and is referred to as the Japanese mainland.

The topography is divided as:

- Hokkaido, Honshu, and Shikoku and its surrounding islands;
- Kyushu and the Ryukyu arc, which is composed of the Ryukyu Islands and other surrounding islands;
- Eastern part of Hokkaido and the Kuril Islands;
- Nanpō Islands and the Izu Peninsula (part of Izu-Bonin-Mariana Arc).

=== Image gallery ===
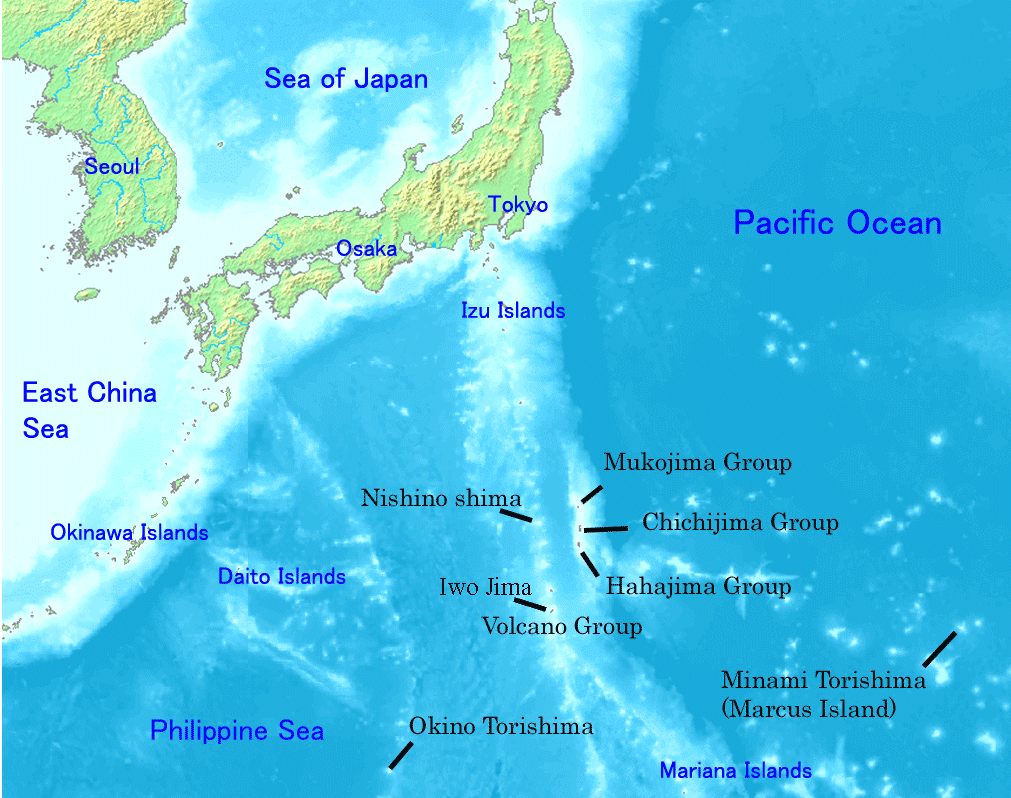
The Nanpō Islands stretch to the southeast and are administered by the Tokyo Metropolis.

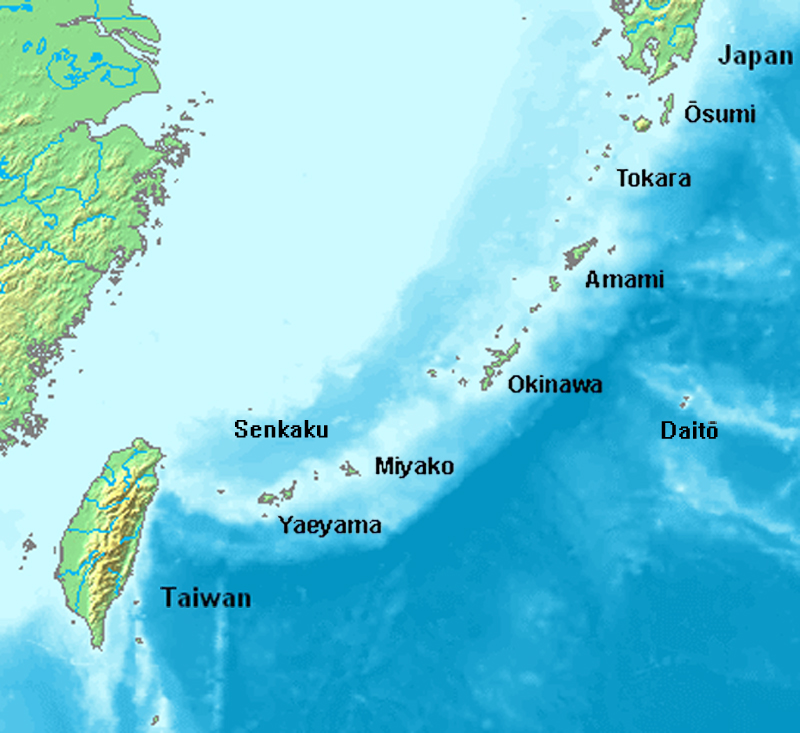
The Ryukyu Islands, which stretch towards Taiwan, are administered by Kagoshima Prefecture and Okinawa Prefecture.

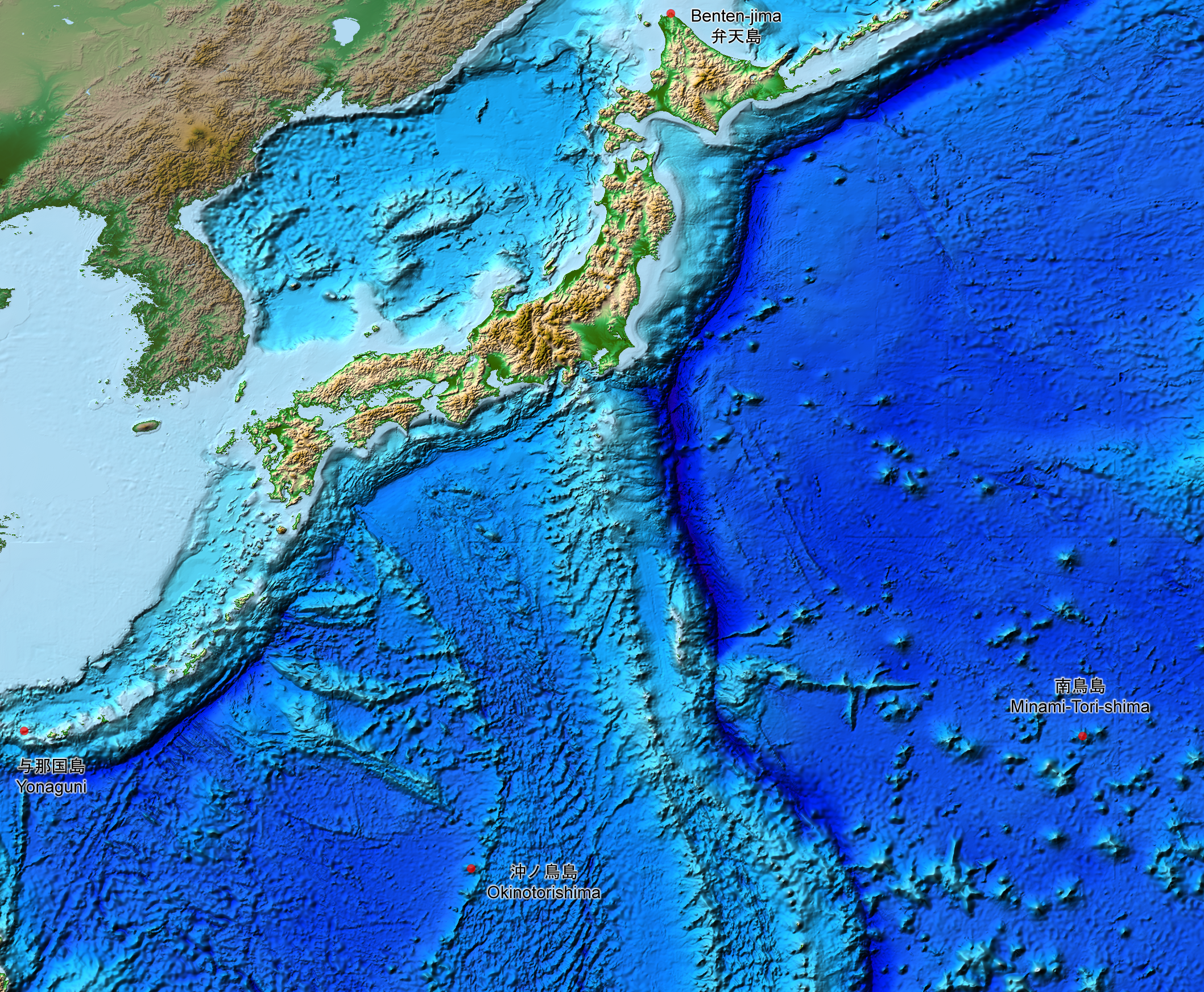
Seabed relief map, showing surface and underwater terrain and islands such as Minami-Tori-Shima, Benten-jima, Okinotorishima, and Yonaguni

== See also ==
- Japan in the Paleolithic
- List of extreme points of Japan
- List of islands of Japan
