= Bunji Okada =

Japanese politician

- 岡田 文次
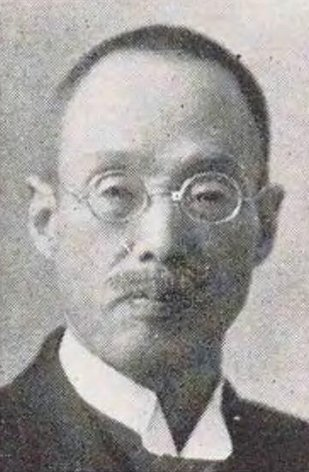

Member of the House of Peers
- In office 21 September 1918 – 23 July 1943 Nominated by the Emperor

Superintendent General of the Tokyo Metropolitan Police Department
- In office 9 October 1916 – 30 September 1918
- Preceded by: Nishikubo Hiromichi
- Succeeded by: Oka Kishichirō

Director of the Karafuto Agency
- In office 5 June 1914 – 9 October 1916
- Monarch: Taishō
- Preceded by: Sadatarō Hiraoka
- Succeeded by: Akira Sakaya

Governor of Tochigi Prefecture
- In office 11 August 1911 – 5 June 1914
- Monarchs: Meiji; Taishō
- Preceded by: Miyozō Nakayama
- Succeeded by: Kitagawa Nobuyori

Personal details
- Born: Bunji Hamada; 1 January 1874 Yamagata Prefecture, Japan
- Died: 23 July 1943 (aged 69)
- Education: Tokyo Imperial University

Bunji Okada (Japanese: 岡田文次; 1 January 1874 – 23 July 1943) was Director of the Karafuto Agency from 1914 to 1916. He was Governor of Tochigi Prefecture from 1911 to 1914.

== Biography ==
Okada was born in Yamagata Prefecture, the son of Chonosuke Hamada, a samurai; he was adopted by Gishitsu Okada. He graduated from the law college of Tokyo Imperial University in 1908.

Okada was appointed to the Council of Okinawa Prefecture in 1899. From 1911 to 1914, he was governor of Tochigi Prefecture, and from 1914 to 1916 he was director of the Karafuto Agency. He was chief of police in Yamanashi and Chibaearlier in his career, and became superintendent general of the Tokyo Metropolitan Police Department in 1916.

In 1920, Okada was president of the International Motion Picture Company, based in Tokyo.
