= Katsuzō Toyota =

- 豊田 勝蔵
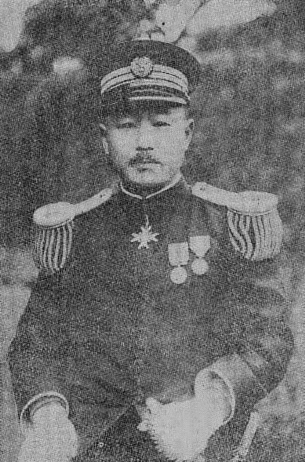

Mayor of Hagi
- In office 8 August 1932 – 11 February 1936
- Preceded by: Position established
- Succeeded by: Ichirō Ichikawa

Director of the Karafuto Agency
- In office 5 August 1926 – 27 July 1927
- Monarch: Taishō
- Preceded by: Akira Sakaya
- Succeeded by: Kōji Kita

Governor of Fukui Prefecture
- In office 23 July 1924 – 5 August 1926
- Monarch: Taishō
- Preceded by: Takasuke Fukunaga
- Succeeded by: Keizō Ichimura

Personal details
- Born: 27 December 1882 Abu, Yamaguchi, Japan
- Died: 23 November 1939 (aged 56)
- Education: Tokyo Imperial University

Katsuzō Toyota (Japanese: 豊田勝蔵; 27 December 1882 – 23 November 1939) was Director of the Karafuto Agency (5 August 1926 – 27 July 1927). He was also mayor of Hagi, Yamaguchi and Governor of Fukui Prefecture (1924–1926). He was a graduate of Tokyo Imperial University. He was a member of the Government-General of Taiwan.

| Preceded by Akira Sakaya | Director of the Karafuto Agency; 1926–1927 | Succeeded by Kōji Kita |
