= Shinobu Agata =

Japanese politician

- 縣 忍
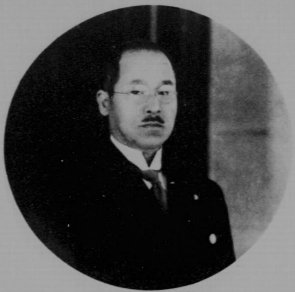

Mayor of Nagoya
- In office 10 January 1939 – 6 January 1942
- Preceded by: Ōiwa Isao
- Succeeded by: Masatoshi Satō
Gubernatorial offices
Governor of Osaka Prefecture
In office 28 June 1932 – 15 January 1935
Monarch	Hirohito
Preceded by	Munenori Saito
Succeeded by	Eiji Yasui
Director of the Karafuto Agency
In office 9 July 1929 – 17 December 1931
Monarch	Hirohito
Preceded by	Kōji Kita
Succeeded by	Masao Kishimoto
Governor of Gunma Prefecture
In office 17 May 1927 – 10 January 1928
Monarch	Hirohito
Preceded by	Kudara Bunsuke
Succeeded by	Ōmori Kaichi
Governor of Chiba Prefecture
In office 28 September 1926 – 17 May 1927
Monarchs	Taishō; Hirohito
Preceded by	Toshio Motoda
Succeeded by	Takasuke Fukunaga
Governor of Kagoshima Prefecture
In office 24 June 1924 – 28 September 1926
Monarch	Taishō
Preceded by	Toyoji Obata
Succeeded by	Miki Nagano
Governor of Yamagata Prefecture
In office 16 October 1922 – 24 June 1924
Monarch	Taishō
Preceded by	Izumi Morimoto
Succeeded by	Masao Kishimoto

Personal details
- Born: 30 June 1881 Tenryū, Shizuoka, Japan
- Died: 6 January 1942 (aged 60)
- Education: Tokyo Imperial University

Shinobu Agata (縣 忍, Agata Shinobu; 30 June 1881 – 6 January 1942) was Director of the Karafuto Agency (1929–1931). He was Governor of Yamagata Prefecture (1922–1924), Kagoshima Prefecture (1924–1926), Chiba Prefecture (1926–1927), Gunma Prefecture (1927–1928), Osaka (1932–1935) and Mayor of Nagoya (1939 – 6 January 1942). He was prefectural governor of Osaka at the time of a destructive typhoon in 1934.

Agata was from Shizuoka Prefecture. He was a graduate of the University of Tokyo. He died in office while serving as mayor of Nagoya.

Preceded by Kōji Kita	Director of the Karafuto Agency; 1929–1931	Succeeded by Masao Kishimoto
