= Takeshi Imamura =

Japanese politician (1880–1960)

- 今村 武志
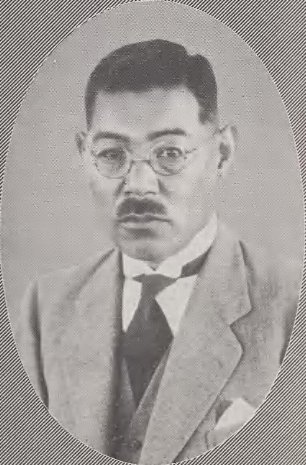

Mayor of Sendai
- In office 23 September 1942 – 14 May 1946
- Preceded by: Tokusaburō Shibuya
- Succeeded by: Eimatsu Okazaki

Director of the Karafuto Agency
- In office 5 July 1932 – 7 May 1938
- Monarch: Hirohito
- Preceded by: Masao Kishimoto
- Succeeded by: Munesue Shun'ichi

Governor of Kōkai Province
- In office 11 August 1925 – 29 March 1928
- Monarchs: Taishō; Hirohito
- Preceded by: Eizaburo Yanabe
- Succeeded by: Pak Sang-jun

Personal details
- Born: 2 November 1880 Tagajō, Miyagi, Japan
- Died: 21 August 1960 (aged 79)
- Resting place: Tama Cemetery
- Education: Tokyo Imperial University

Takeshi Imamura (Japanese: 今村武志; 2 November 1880 – 21 August 1960) was Director of the Karafuto Agency (1932–1938) and Mayor of Sendai (1942–1946). He was a graduate of the University of Tokyo and Tohoku University. He was a member of the Korean History Compilation Committee.

Preceded by Masao Kishimoto	Director of the Karafuto Agency; 1932–1938	Succeeded by Munei Toshikazu
