= Uryu Dam =

Dam in Hokkaidō Prefecture, Japan

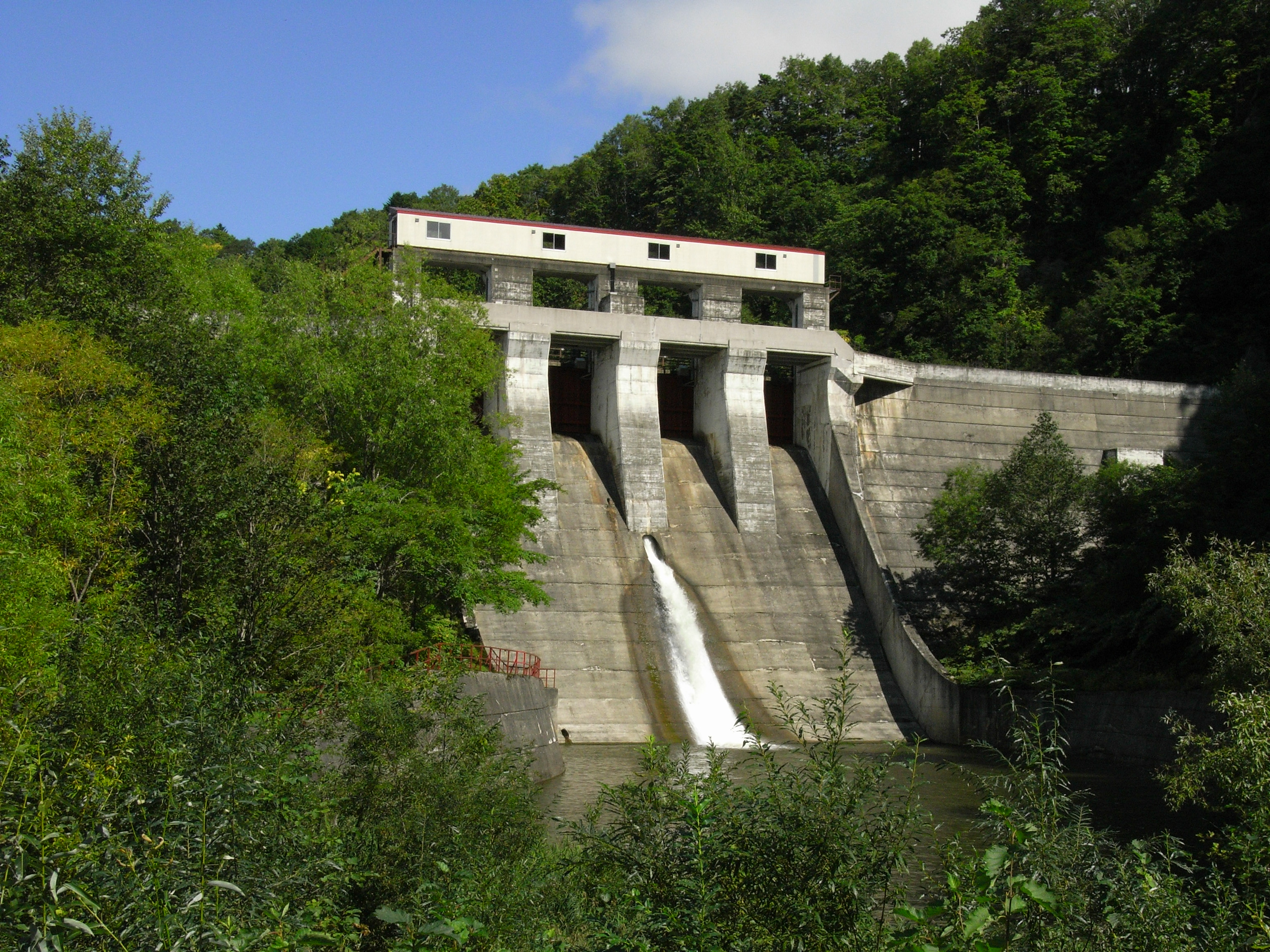
- Uryu Dam No.2
- Interactive map of Uryu Dam
- Location: Kamikawa Subprefecture, Hokkaido, Japan
- Coordinates: 44.3006°N 142.182°E
- Construction began: 1939
- Opening date: 1943

Dam and spillways
- Impounds: Uryu River
- Height: 45.5 m
- Length: 216 m

Reservoir
- Total capacity: 224,653,000 m^{3}
- Catchment area: 368.5 km^{2}
- Surface area: 2,373 hectares

The Uryu Dam (雨竜ダム) is a dam complex in Kamikawa Subprefecture, Hokkaido, Japan on the Uryu River. It consists of two dams. It is a power generation dam managed by Hokkaido Electric Power Co., Inc., and is a gravity-type concrete dam with a bank height of 45.5 meters. Lake Shumarinai, which is an artificial lake, is more famous than a dam, but this lake is the largest artificial lake in Japan with a flooded area (the area of a dam lake). This record has not yet been broken since it was completed in 1943 (Showa 18) during World War II.

== Uryu No.1 Dam ==
Uryu No.1 (Re) (Japanese: 雨竜第一ダム（再）) is a gravity dam located in Hokkaido, Japan. The dam is used for flood control and power production. The catchment area of the dam is 368.5 km^{2}. The dam impounds about 2,373 ha of land when full and can store 244,700 cubic meters of water. The construction of the dam was started in 2018.

== Uryu No.2 Dam ==
Uryu No.2 Dam (Japanese: 雨竜第二ダム（元）) is a gravity dam located in Hokkaido, Japan. The dam is used for power production. The catchment area of the dam is 109.7 km^{2}. The dam impounds about 177 ha of land when full and can store 21,589 cubic meters of water. The construction of the dam was started on 1939 and completed in 1943.
