= Nishikubo Shrine =

Defunct Shinto shrine formerly located in Yuzhno-Sakhalinsk, Russia

Nishikubo Shrine (西久保神社, Nishikubo jinja) was a Shinto shrine in Toyohara, Karafuto Prefecture (today Yuzhno-Sakhalinsk, Sakhalin Oblast, Russia).

The shrine was established in 1915, and its main annual festival was held on July 2. Kami enshrined here included the soul of Major Nishikubo Toyoichirō (西久保豊一郎), a hero of the Russo-Japanese War, and 18 others. The honden (main hall) was built in shinmeizukuri architectural style.
