= Masayoshi Ogawa =

Japanese lawyer (1894–1977)

- 小河 正儀
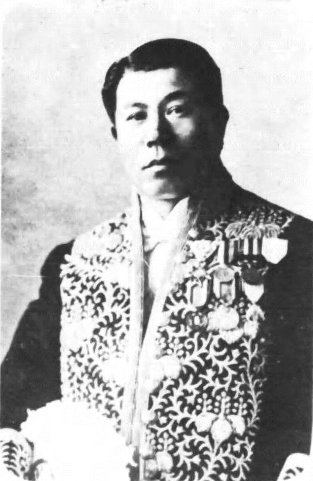

Director of the Karafuto Agency
- In office 9 April 1940 – 1 July 1943
- Monarch: Hirohito
- Preceded by: Munesue Shun'ichi
- Succeeded by: Toshio Ōtsu

Governor of Mie Prefecture
- In office 1 March 1939 – 9 April 1940
- Monarch: Hirohito
- Preceded by: Masatoshi Satō
- Succeeded by: Yokichirō Nakano

Governor of Aomori Prefecture
- In office 16 October 1936 – 1 March 1939
- Monarch: Hirohito
- Preceded by: Mitsumasa Kobayashi
- Succeeded by: Minoru Suzuki

Personal details
- Born: 2 December 1894 Yamaguchi, Japan
- Died: 7 January 1977 (aged 82)
- Education: Tokyo Imperial University

Masayoshi Ogawa (Japanese: 小河正儀) (2 December 1894 – 7 January 1977) was a Japanese lawyer and director of the Karafuto Agency (1940–1943). He was Governor of Aomori Prefecture (1936–1939) and Mie Prefecture (1939–1940). He was also a member of the Government-General of Taiwan.

Preceded by Munei Toshikazu	Director of the Karafuto Agency; 1940–1943	Succeeded by Toshio Ōtsu
