= Mainland Japan =

Political term in Japan

Coordinates: 36°N 138°E

Native name: 内地
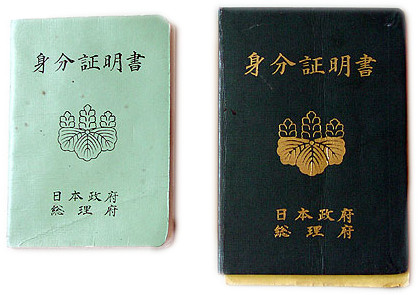
- Passports for passengers between Mainland Japan and Okinawa during 1952–1972.
- Interactive map of Mainland Japan

Geography
- Location: Japan

Demographics
- Ethnic groups: Japanese people Ainu people Ryukyuan people

"Mainland Japan" (内地, naichi; lit. '"inner lands"') is a term used to distinguish Japan's core land area from its outlying territories. "Mainland Japan" was an official term in the pre-war period, distinguishing Japan proper from its overseas territories (外地, gaichi, lit. "outer lands") in the Far East, such as Japanese Taiwan, Japanese Korea, Karafuto, the South Seas Mandate, and the Kwantung Leased Territory. After the end of World War II, its usage became less common and lost its previous legal significance.

The term's literal Japanese meaning might best be translated as "inner Japan" or "inner lands". The term "mainland" is somewhat inaccurate since it usually refers to all or part of a continental landmass, rather than islands. In the pre-1945 period, the "inner lands" included the Japanese archipelago, itself including the Ryukyu Islands and other island chains to the south of Honshu. The "inner lands" also referred during 1875–1945 to the Japanese-controlled Kuril Islands and during 1943–1945 to Karafuto, the southern half of the island of Sakhalin.

Today, the term is sometimes colloquially used to distinguish the country's four largest islands (Hokkaido, Honshu, Kyushu, and Shikoku) from smaller islands such as the Bonin Islands and the Ryukyu Islands, although these islands were considered part of Mainland Japan in the pre-war period. However, depending on the context, the term "Mainland Japan" may refer only to Honshū, the largest island.

== Historical usage ==
In the Japanese Empire of the pre-war period, naichi referred to the mainland of the empire. The other territories of the empire was called gaichi (外地, lit. "outer lands").

The Meiji Constitution's Article 1 of the Common Law (共通法) enumerates the territories with legal jurisdictions namely:

=== Naichi ===
Naichi (内地, lit. "inner lands") referred to the territories under direct control of the government. They consisted of the following:

- Karafuto (since 1943)
- Chishima Islands (since 1875)
- Hokkaido
- Honshū
- Shikoku
- Kyūshū
- Izu Islands
- Ryukyu Islands (since 1879)
- Nanpō Islands (since 1891)
  - Ogasawara Islands
  - Iwo Islands
  - Okinotorishima
  - Minamitorishima
- Minor outlying islands around them

=== Gaichi ===
These territories were called gaichi (外地, lit. "outer lands"). They were part of the Empire of Japan, but not under direct control by the central government.

- Ryukyu Islands (until 1879)
- Taiwan
  - Shinnan Islands (since 1938)
  - Seisa Islands (since 1938)
- Karafuto (until 1943)
- Chōsen (Korea)
- Kwantung Province
- South Manchuria Railway Zone
- South Seas Mandate
- Kiautschou Bay Leased Territory
- Tianjin
- Hankou
- Suzhou
- Hangzhou
- Shashi

Although it has never been abolished, the Common Law lost effect from enforcement after Japan lost all the former colonies, or gaichi as a result of World War II.

== Modern usage ==
Residents of places like Hokkaido, Okinawa and Amami occasionally use naichi to refer to the "mainland", excluding these areas. The colloquial usage is officially "incorrect", as both areas are legally within naichi. In Hokkaido, the official term that refers to Japan except Hokkaido is dōgai (lit. outside of Hokkaido). With dōgai becoming common even in colloquial use, naichi ceased to be used. Residents of Okinawa also use the term hondo (lit. mainland) to refer to parts of Japan outside of Okinawa. In Japanese law, the meaning of hondo is used to make a distinction between the "main islands" of Hokkaido, Honshū, Shikoku, and Kyūshū and "outlying islands" referred to as ritō.

The term "main islands" (本島 hontō) is used for Hokkaido, Honshu, Kyushu, Shikoku and Okinawa. The other estimated 6,847 smaller islands are called 'remote islands' (離島 ritō).

== See also ==
- Home Islands
- Mainland China
- China proper
