= Karafuto Prefecture =

Territory of Japan from 1905 to 1945

Karafuto Prefecture 樺太庁 Karafuto 樺太
- Former subdivision of the Empire of Japan
- 1905–1945 (Note: Legally existed until 1949.)
- Flag of Karafuto during the Takushoku Expo (Note: Unofficial.) Emblem

- Green and circled: Karafuto within Japan in 1942; Light green: Other constituents of the Empire of Japan (i.e. internationally recognised as Japanese territory before the Pacific War)

Anthem
- 君が代 ("Kimigayo") "His Imperial Majesty's Reign" (1905–1945) (Note: Modified version used in 1880–1945.) noicon Song: 樺太島歌 ("Karafuto tōka") "Anthem of Karafuto"
- Capital: Ōtomari (1907–1908); Toyohara (1908–1945)
- Area
  - December 1941: 36,090.3 km^{2} (13,934.5 sq mi)
- Population
  - December 1941: 406,557
- Government
- Emperor of Japan
  - 1905–1912: Emperor Meiji
  - 1912–1926: Emperor Taishō
  - 1926–1945: Emperor Shōwa
- History
  - Treaty of Portsmouth: 5 September 1905
  - Administered by Karafuto Civil Administration: 28 August 1905–31 March 1907
  - Karafuto Prefecture established: 1 April 1907
  - Incorporated into inner land: 1 April 1943
  - Soviet invasion and annexation: 11–25 August 1945 (Note: Legally existed until 1949.)
  - Karafuto Prefecture abolished by Japan: 1 June 1949
Preceded by	Succeeded by
Russian Empire; Priamurye Governorate-General	Soviet Union
- Today part of: Sakhalin Oblast in Russia

Karafuto Prefecture (Japanese: 樺太庁, Hepburn: Karafuto-chō; Japanese pronunciation: [ka.ɾa.ɸɯ̥.to]) was established by the Empire of Japan in 1907 to govern the island of Sakhalin south of the 50° N parallel. This territory was ceded to the Empire of Japan by the Russian Empire in the 1905 Treaty of Portsmouth, following Japan's victory in the Russo-Japanese War. Karafuto was part of Japan's outer lands (gaichi) until it was incorporated as an inner land (naichi) of the Japanese metropole in April 1943. The capital of Karafuto was Ōtomari (Korsakov) from 1905 to 1908 and Toyohara (Yuzhno-Sakhalinsk) from 1908 to 1945.

In August 1945, the Japanese administration ceased to function following the Soviet invasion of South Sakhalin. The Soviet Union annexed Karafuto Prefecture, although it continued to exist under Japanese law until Japan formally abolished it in June 1949.

== Name ==
The Japanese name Karafuto purportedly comes from the Ainu kamuy kar put ya mosir (カムィ・カㇻ・プッ・ヤ・モシㇼ), which means 'the island a god has created on the estuary [of the Amur River]'. It was formerly known as Kita Ezo, meaning Northern Ezo (Ezo was the former name for Hokkaido). When Japan governed the southern part of the island, they referred to it as Minami Karafuto (南樺太, South Karafuto) or simply Karafuto (樺太). The northern part of the island was called Kita Karafuto (北樺太, North Karafuto) or simply Sagaren (薩哈嗹).

In Russian, the entire island was named Sakhalin or Saghalien. It is from Manchu sahaliyan ula angga hada, meaning "peak of the mouth of Amur River". The southern part was simply called Yuzhny Sakhalin ("South Sakhalin"). In Korean, the name was Sahallin or Hwataedo, with the latter name in use during Japanese rule in Korea.

== History ==
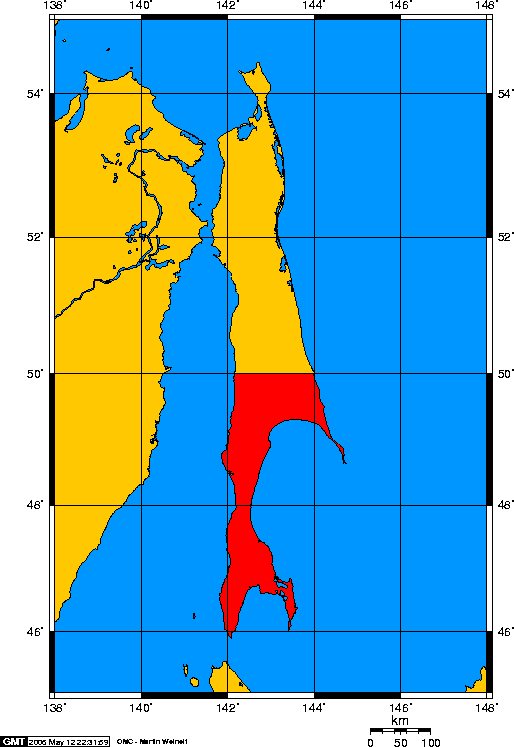
Map of Sakhalin with parallels showing the division at the 50th parallel north with the Karafuto Prefecture highlighted in red

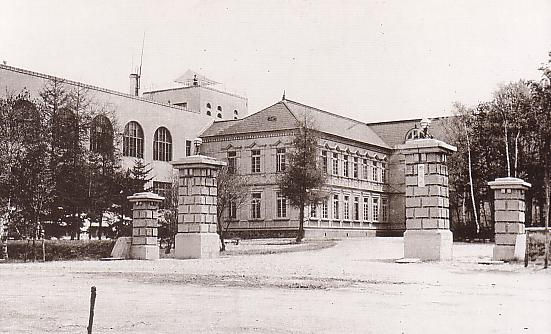
The Karafuto Prefectural Office in Toyohara

Japanese settlement on Sakhalin dates back to at least the Edo period. Ōtomari was established in 1679, and cartographers of the Matsumae domain mapped the island and named it "Kita Ezo". Japanese cartographer and explorer Mamiya Rinzō established that Sakhalin was an island through his discovery of Mamiya Strait (now the Strait of Tartary) in 1809. Japan unilaterally proclaimed sovereignty over the whole island in 1845.

The 1855 Treaty of Shimoda acknowledged that both the Russian Empire and Japan had joint rights of occupation to Sakhalin, without setting a definite territorial demarcation. As the island became settled in the 1860s and 1870s, this ambiguity led to increasing friction between settlers. Attempts by the Tokugawa shogunate to purchase the entire island from the Russian Empire failed, and the new Meiji government was unable to negotiate a partition of the island into separate territories. In the Treaty of Saint Petersburg (1875), Japan agreed to give up its claims on Sakhalin in exchange for undisputed ownership of the Kuril Islands.

Japan invaded Sakhalin in the final stages of the Russo-Japanese War of 1904–1905, but per the 1905 Treaty of Portsmouth was allowed to retain only the southern portion of the island below the 50° N parallel. Russia retained the northern portion, but Japan was awarded favorable commercial rights that included fishing and mineral extraction rights in the north. In 1907, Karafuto Prefecture was officially established, with the capital at Ōtomari. In 1908, the capital was relocated to Toyohara.

In 1920, Karafuto was officially designated an "outer land" of Japan, and its administration and development came under the aegis of the Ministry of Colonial Affairs. Following the Nikolaevsk incident in 1920, Japan occupied the northern half of Sakhalin. This occupation would continue until the establishment of formal diplomatic relations between Japan and the Soviet Union in 1925 with the Soviet–Japanese Basic Convention. The treaty permitted Japan petroleum and coal concessions in northern Sakhalin. The former would be operated by institutions such as the North Sakhalin Oil Company until 1944. From 1926 to 1927, parts of Karafuto's non-Ainu native population would be relocated to the settlement of Otasu.

As Japan was extending its influence over East Asia and the Pacific through the establishment of the Greater East Asia Co-Prosperity Sphere, the Imperial Japanese Army made plans to invade the Soviet Union if it either became involved in the Pacific War or collapsed due to the ongoing German invasion. One of the goals was to annex the remaining northern half of Sakhalin to Japan. In 1943, the status of Karafuto was upgraded to that of an "inner land", making it an integral part of Japan.

=== Soviet Invasion ===
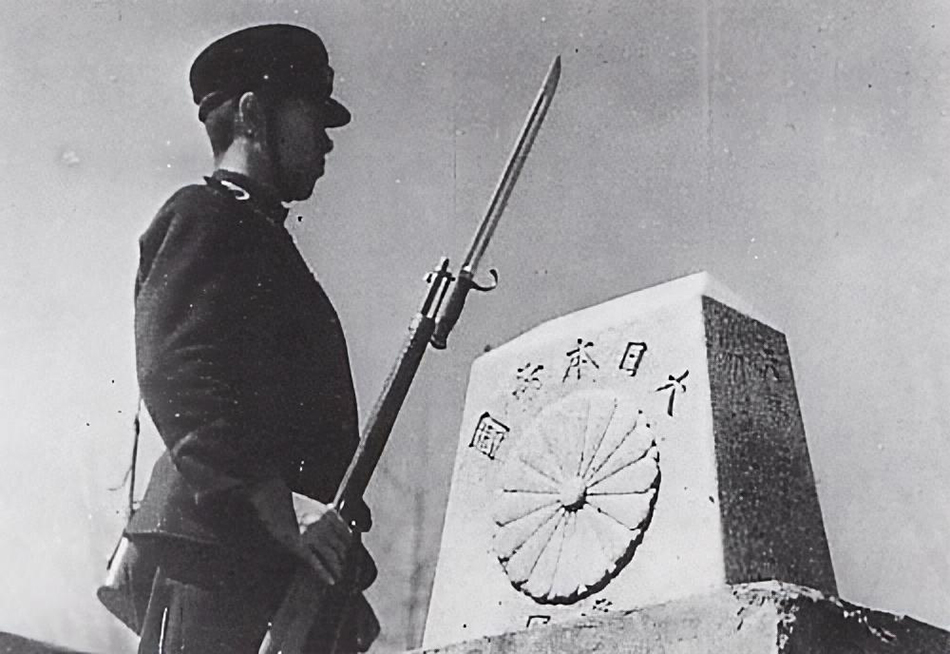
A Japanese soldier at the border between the Karafuto Prefecture and Soviet Sakhalin

In August 1945, after repudiating the Soviet–Japanese Neutrality Pact in April, and according to the signed agreements of Yalta, in which Stalin pledged that the Soviet Union would enter the Pacific War three months after the defeat of Germany, the Soviet Union invaded Karafuto. The Soviet attack started on 11 August 1945, three days before the surrender of Japan. The Soviet 56th Rifle Corps, part of the 16th Army, consisting of the 79th Rifle Division, the 2nd Rifle Brigade, the 5th Rifle Brigade and the 214 Armored Brigade, attacked the Japanese 88th Infantry Division. Although the Soviet Red Army outnumbered the Japanese by three to one, they advanced only slowly due to strong Japanese resistance. It was not until the 113th Rifle Brigade and the 365th Independent Naval Infantry Rifle Battalion from Sovetskaya Gavan landed in Tōro, a seashore village in western Karafuto, on 16 August that the Soviets broke the Japanese defense line. Japanese resistance grew weaker after this landing. Actual fighting continued until 21 August. Between 22 and 23 August, most remaining Japanese units agreed to a ceasefire. The Soviets completed the conquest of Karafuto on 25 August 1945, by occupying the capital of Toyohara.

=== Post-War Status ===
By the end of hostilities, 80,000 residents had already fled Karafuto and civilian casualties numbered from 3,500 to 3,700. This left the prefecture with a population of about 300,000. From the end of the war to 1946, the remaining population would live and work alongside incoming Soviet settlers. Karafuto's municipal and industrial leaders retained their positions and would stay on as deputies after being replaced by Soviet equivalents. Marxism-Leninism was added to school curricula and Shintoism was removed, though temples and religious gatherings were still permitted. Following an agreement between the United States and the USSR on December 19, 1946, repatriation of the Japanese population began.

At the conclusion of the repatriation program in July 1949, there were 279,356 people who had arrived from Karafuto to Japan, with 35% claiming no familial connection to the Japanese home islands. Repatriates had their property confiscated as colonial holdings, as was done in Korea and Taiwan. But the Overseas Compatriots Relief Committee refused to provide aid on account of Karafuto’s 1943 reclassification from outer to inner land.

The majority of repatriates resettled in Hokkaido. At least 17,600 were sent to prefectures in the Tohoku region and 296 homeless repatriates were sent to Tottori. A Japanese population of 332 would remain in Sakhalin after 1949. Following the Soviet–Japanese Joint Declaration of 1956, most of this small population would be repatriated as well.

Repatriation being limited to Japanese residents and the subsequent Korean War prevented the repatriation of Karafuto’s Korean population. Resulting in a population of Sakhalin Koreans persisting into the present day.

The Japanese government formally abolished Karafuto Prefecture as a legal entity on 1 June 1949. With the Treaty of San Francisco, Japan renounced its rights to Sakhalin, despite not formally acknowledging Soviet sovereignty over it, nor the Kuril Islands. Both territories currently compromise the Russian Federation's Sakhalin Oblast. The Japan-Sakhalin Association currently exists to maintain ties between former Japanese residents of Sakhalin and its current inhabitants.

== Demographics ==
=== Ethnic groups ===
- Japanese
- Korean
- Ainu
- Orok
- Nivkh

=== Census ===
The Results Report of the Shōwa 10 (1935) National Census
Karafuto Chapter

Population by civil registration and nationality
	Population
Total	331,943
Naichi	320,689
Indigenous	1,949
Gaichi	8,842
Korea	8,841
Taiwan	1
Foreigner	463
Manchukuo	11
Republic of China	194
Former Russia (Note: 舊露西亞 refers to the Russian Empire (1721–1917) and the Russian people who remained living in Southern Sakhalin after it became Japanese territory, as well as the White émigrés who came as a result of the Russian Civil War.)	201
Germany	7
Poland	50

The population by region of Naichi people
Region	Population
Karafuto	100,853
Hokkaido	86,376
Tōhoku	76,698
Others	53,762
Total	320,689

Population of Naichi, Indigenous, Gaichi people, and foreigners by subprefecture
Subprefecture	Population				
Subprefecture	Naichi	Indigenous	Gaichi	Foreigner	Total
Toyohara	64,787	276	694	101	65,858
Ōtomari	61,366	140	300	121	61,927
Honto	22,932	19	251	21	23,223
Maoka	48,353	447	385	16	49,201
Tomarioru	56,928	412	3,601	90	61,031
Motodomari	25,327	33	1,147	37	26,544
Shikuka	40,996	622	2,464	77	44,159
Total	320,689	1,949	8,842	463	331,943

The population of indigenous ethnic groups by subprefecture
Subprefecture	Population						
Subprefecture	Ainu	Orok	Nivkh	Evenki	Ulch	Yakut	Total
Toyohara	276	0	0	0	0	0	276
Ōtomari	138	0	0	2	0	0	140
Honto	19	0	0	0	0	0	19
Maoka	447	0	0	0	0	0	447
Tomarioru	412	0	0	0	0	0	412
Motodomari	32	1	0	0	0	0	33
Shikuka	180	299	110	22	9	2	622
Total	1,504	300	110	24	9	2	1,949

== Economy ==
The pre-war economy of Karafuto was based on fishing, forestry and agriculture, together with extraction of coal and petroleum. In terms of industry, the paper industry and the charcoal production industry was well developed. Pulp for rayon production in Honshu was predominately sourced from Karafuto. The territory suffered from a labor shortage through most of its history, and migrant laborers from the Japanese mainland were frequently recruited for seasonal work on in Karafuto. In 1924, 57% of laborers in the construction and forestry industry came from Tohoku and 22% from the Hokuriku region. These laborers would reside in worker dormitories near their sites before returning to their home provinces upon completion of the project. Forced labor known as Takobeya Labor would be used throughout Karafuto's history as well. Indigenous Nivkh and Oroks worked in Japanese-run fisheries and a synthetic textile plant near the Russian border. For the construction of the Toyohara-Maoka line, bonded labor was put to use, including Chinese contract laborers. By the end of the 1920s, these laborers would be replaced with Koreans. With the start of the Second Sino-Japanese War in 1937, their population would increase substantially.

== Transportation ==
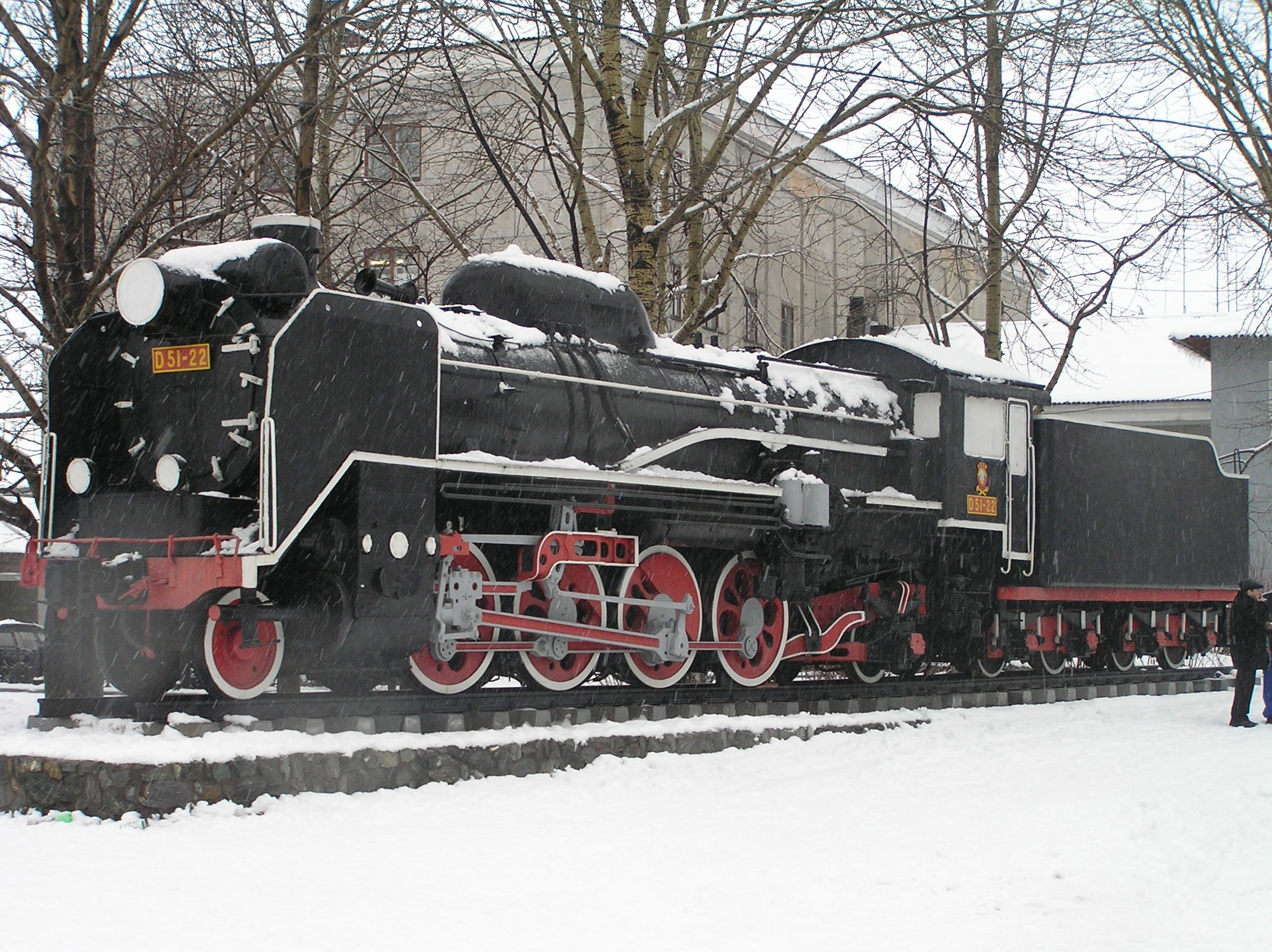
This Japanese D51 steam locomotive stands outside the present day Yuzhno-Sakhalinsk Railway Station, Sakhalin Oblast, Russia. They were used by the Soviet Railways until 1979.

On November 17 1906, a 42.5-kilometre-long (26.4 mi) railway connecting Tohoyara and Otomari was completed. In 1910, this railway would be converted from 600 mm (1 ft 11 5/8 in) to 1,067 mm (3 ft 6 in), standardizing it with the rest of Japan's railways. Over the following decades an extensive railway network was constructed in Karafuto to transport freight and passengers across the prefecture. The Karafuto Railway Bureau (樺太鐵道局, Karafuto Tetsudōkyoku) maintained 682.6 kilometers of track in four main lines and an additional 58.2 kilometers of track. After 1945, this network would serve as the foundation of the Sakhalin Railway.

== Government ==
Karafuto was administered from the central government in Tokyo as the Karafuto Agency (樺太廳, Karafuto-chō) under the Colonization Bureau (拓務局, Takumukyoku) of the Home Ministry. The Colonization Bureau became the Ministry of Colonial Affairs (拓務省, Takumushō) in 1923 at which time Karafuto was officially designated an overseas territory of the Empire of Japan.

When the Ministry of Colonial Affairs was absorbed into the new Ministry of Greater East Asia in 1942, the administration of Karafuto was separated, and Karafuto became an integral part of the Japanese archipelago.

=== Directors of the Karafuto Agency ===
No.	Picture	Name	Took office	Left office
1		Kiichirō Kumagai (熊谷喜一郎)	28 July 1905	31 March 1907
2		Kusunose Yukihiko (楠瀬 幸彦)	1 April 1907	24 April 1908
3		Tokonami Takejirō (床次 竹二郎)	24 April 1908	12 June 1908
4		Sadatarō Hiraoka (平岡定太郎)	12 June 1908	5 June 1914
5		Bunji Okada (岡田文次)	5 June 1914	9 October 1916
6		Akira Sakaya (昌谷 彰) (First term)	13 October 1916	17 April 1919
7		Kinjirō Nagai (永井金次郎)	17 April 1919	11 June 1924
		Akira Sakaya (昌谷 彰) (Second term)	11 June 1924	5 August 1926
8		Katsuzō Toyota (豊田勝蔵)	5 August 1926	27 July 1927
9		Kōji Kita (喜多孝治)	27 July 1927	9 July 1929
10		Shinobu Agata (縣 忍)	9 July 1929	17 December 1931
11		Masao Kishimoto (岸本正雄)	17 December 1931	5 July 1932
12		Takeshi Imamura (今村武志)	5 July 1932	7 May 1938
13		Shunichi Munesue (棟居俊一)	7 May 1938	9 April 1940
14		Masayoshi Ogawa (小河正儀)	9 April 1940	1 July 1943
15		Toshio Ōtsu (大津敏男)	1 July 1943	11 November 1947

== Political divisions ==
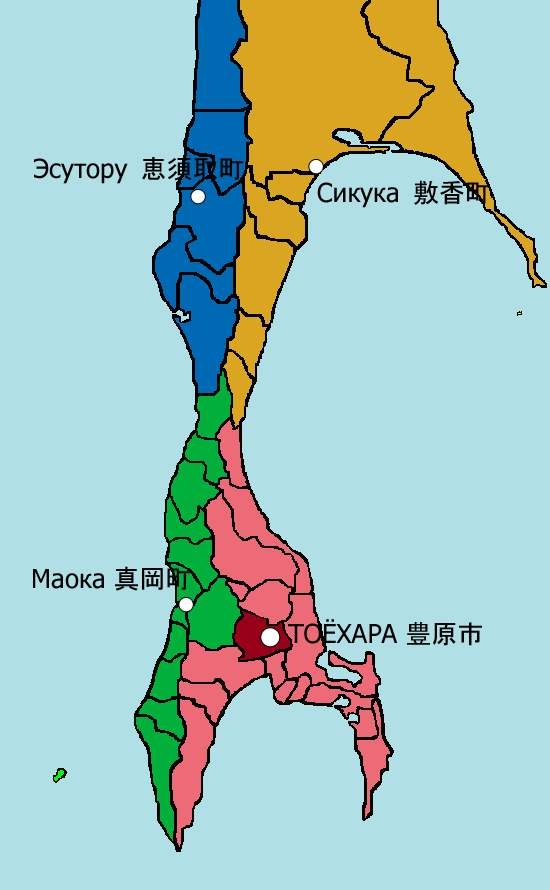
Karafuto Prefecture with 4 subprefectures, namely Toyohara, Maoka, Esutoru and Shikuka. Toyohara City was also a part of Toyohara Subprefecture.

As of 1945, Karafuto was divided into four subprefectures, which in turn were subdivided into 11 districts, in turn divided into 41 municipalities (one city, 13 towns, and 27 villages).

Karafuto's largest city was Toyohara, while other major cities included Esutoru in the north central and Maoka in the south central region.

The list below are the towns and the city of the prefecture. These in italics are the corresponding current Russian names.

Esutoru Subprefecture (惠須取支廳)

- Towns
  - Chinnai (珍內町, Krasnogorsk)
  - Esutoru (惠須取町, Uglegorsk)
  - Nayoshi (名好町, Lesogorskoye)
  - Tōro (塔路町, Shakhtyorsk)
- Villages
  - Nishisakutan (西柵丹村, Boshnyakovo)
  - Ushiro (鵜城村, Orlovo)

Maoka Subprefecture (眞岡支廳)

- Towns
  - Honto (本斗町, Nevelsk)
  - Maoka (眞岡町, Kholmsk)
  - Naihoro (內幌町, Gornozavodsk)
  - Noda (野田町, Chekhov)
  - Tomarioru (泊居町, Tomari)
- Villages
  - Kusyunnai (久春内村, Ilyinskoe)
  - Nayori (名寄村, Penzenskoe)
  - Konotoro (小能登呂村, Kostromskoe)
  - Randomari (蘭泊村, Yabrochnoye)
  - Hirochi (廣地村, Pravda)
  - Kounin (好仁村, Shebunino)
  - Kaiba (海馬村, Moneron Island)

Shikuka Subprefecture (敷香支廳)

- Towns
  - Shirutoru (知取町, Makarov)
  - Shikuka, Shisuka (敷香町, Poronaysk)
- Villages
  - Chirie (散江村)
  - Nairo (内路村, Gastello)
  - Tomarikishi (泊岸村, Vakhrushev)
  - Motodomari (元泊村, Vostochnoye)
  - Hoyori (帆寄村, Pugachovo)

Toyohara Subprefecture (豐原支廳)

- City
  - Toyohara (豐原市, Yuzhno-Sakhalinsk)
- Towns
  - Ochiai (落合町, Dolinsk)
  - Ōtomari (大泊町, Korsakov)
  - Rūtaka (留多加町, Aniva)
- Villages
  - Shiranui (白縫村, Arsentyevka)
  - Sakaehama (榮濱村, Starodubskoe)
  - Kawakami (川上村, Sinegorsk)
  - Toyokita (豐北村, Novo-Aleksandrovsk)
  - Chitose (千歳村, Solovyovka)
  - Fukami (深海村, Prigorodnoe)
  - Tonnai (富内村, Okhotskoe)
  - Nagahama (長濱村, Utesnoye)
  - Tōbuchi (遠淵村, Muravyevo)
  - Shiretoko (知床村, Novikovo)

== See also ==
- Karafuto Fortress
- Apostolic Prefecture of Yuzhno Sakhalinsk
- Karafuto Shrine
- Nishikubo Shrine
- Sakhalin Ainu language
- Sakhalin Koreans
- Kuril Islands dispute
- Ainu in Russia
