= 2009 in Japan =

- Decades: 1980s; 1990s; 2000s; 2010s; 2020s
- See also: Other events of 2009; History of Japan • Timeline • Years

Events in the year 2009 in Japan.

== Incumbents ==
- Emperor – Akihito
- Prime Minister – Taro Aso (Liberal Democratic Party–Fukuoka) until September 16, Yukio Hatoyama (Democratic Party–Hokkaidō)
- Chief Cabinet Secretary: Takeo Kawamura (L–Yamaguchi) until September 16, Hirofumi Hirano (D–Ōsaka)
- Chief Justice of the Supreme Court: Hironobu Takesaki
- President of the House of Representatives: Yōhei Kōno (L–Kanagawa) until July 21, Takahiro Yokomichi (D–Hokkaidō) from September 16
- President of the House of Councillors: Satsuki Eda (D–Okayama)
- Diet sessions: 171st (regular, January 5 to July 21), 172nd (special, September 16 to September 19), 173rd (extraordinary, October 26 to December 4)

=== Governors ===
- Aichi Prefecture: Masaaki Kanda
- Akita Prefecture: Sukeshiro Terata (until 19 April); Norihisa Satake (starting 20 April)
- Aomori Prefecture: Shingo Mimura
- Chiba Prefecture: Akiko Dōmoto (until 4 April); Kensaku Morita (starting 5 April)
- Ehime Prefecture: Moriyuki Kato
- Fukui Prefecture: Issei Nishikawa
- Fukuoka Prefecture: Wataru Asō
- Fukushima Prefecture: Yūhei Satō
- Gifu Prefecture: Hajime Furuta
- Gunma Prefecture: Masaaki Osawa
- Hiroshima Prefecture: Yūzan Fujita (until 29 November); Hidehiko Yuzaki (starting 29 November)
- Hokkaido: Harumi Takahashi
- Hyogo Prefecture: Toshizō Ido
- Ibaraki Prefecture: Masaru Hashimoto
- Ishikawa Prefecture: Masanori Tanimoto
- Iwate Prefecture: Takuya Tasso
- Kagawa Prefecture: Takeki Manabe
- Kagoshima Prefecture: Satoshi Mitazono
- Kanagawa Prefecture: Shigefumi Matsuzawa
- Kochi Prefecture: Masanao Ozaki
- Kumamoto Prefecture: Ikuo Kabashima
- Kyoto Prefecture: Keiji Yamada
- Mie Prefecture: Akihiko Noro
- Miyagi Prefecture: Yoshihiro Murai
- Miyazaki Prefecture: Hideo Higashikokubaru
- Nagano Prefecture: Jin Murai
- Nagasaki Prefecture: Genjirō Kaneko
- Nara Prefecture: Shōgo Arai
- Niigata Prefecture: Hirohiko Izumida
- Oita Prefecture: Katsusada Hirose
- Okayama Prefecture: Masahiro Ishii
- Okinawa Prefecture: Hirokazu Nakaima
- Osaka Prefecture:Tōru Hashimoto
- Saga Prefecture: Yasushi Furukawa
- Saitama Prefecture: Kiyoshi Ueda
- Shiga Prefecture: Yukiko Kada
- Shiname Prefecture: Zenbe Mizoguchi
- Shizuoka Prefecture: Yoshinobu Ishikawa (until 7 July); Heita Kawakatsu (starting 7 July)
- Tochigi Prefecture: Tomikazu Fukuda
- Tokushima Prefecture: Kamon Iizumi
- Tokyo: Shintarō Ishihara
- Tottori Prefecture: Shinji Hirai
- Toyama Prefecture: Takakazu Ishii
- Wakayama Prefecture: Yoshinobu Nisaka
- Yamagata Prefecture: Hiroshi Saitō (until 14 February); Mieko Yoshimura (starting 14 February)
- Yamaguchi Prefecture: Sekinari Nii
- Yamanashi Prefecture: Shōmei Yokouchi

== Events ==
=== January ===
- January 1 – About 240,000 people in some 93,000 households in Hachinohe and six other municipalities in Aomori Prefecture have gone without water for one to six days because of a duct problem.
- January 3 – Former Democratic Party of Japan (DPJ) lawmaker Hisayasu Nagata commits suicide in Yahata Nishi-ku, Kitakyūshū, Fukuoka Prefecture.
- January 13 – Aid group worker Dr. Keiko Akahane returns to Japan following her release from three months in captivity in Somalia.
- January 14 – Keiji Fujimaki, vice president of Nishimatsu Construction, and three others are arrested on suspicion of violating foreign exchange regulations for allegedly bringing in 70 million Yen in funds from abroad without reporting them to customs authorities.
- January 23 – The Japan Aerospace Exploration Agency launches the world's first-ever Greenhouse Gases Observing Satellite, "Ibuki", from Tanegashima Space Center.

=== February ===
- February 1 – Mount Sakurajima in Kagoshima Prefecture erupts.
- February 2 – Mount Asama located between Gunma Prefecture and Nagano Prefecture erupts.
- February 10 – Norihisa Oga, president of Oita-based consultant firm Daiko, is arrested along with six others on suspicion of violating the corporation tax law by masterminding an elaborate tax dodge including slush funds funneled by Kajima Construction over the construction of two plants for Canon.
- February 13 – Japan Post and leasing firm Orix agree to cancel their controversial 10.9 billion yen deal involving sell-out of dozens of Kampo no Yado inns and housing facilities.
- February 17 – Japanese Finance Minister Shōichi Nakagawa resigns over allegations of drunkenness at the press conference held after the G7 meeting in Rome.
- February 22 – "Departures" wins the Academy Award for Best Foreign Language Film at the 81st Academy Awards.

=== March ===
- March 1 – Kyushu Railway Company inaugurates SUGOCA rechargeable contactless smart card ticketing system in Fukuoka Prefecture.
- March 3 – The chief secretary of Ichirō Ozawa, head of the DPJ is arrested on suspicion of accepting illegal corporate donations from Nishimatsu Construction.
- March 4 – 2-trillion-yen stimulus plan, which allows one-time cash handout of 12,000 yen per person, and additional 8,000 yen for age 18 and under and 65 and older, is approved by a two-thirds majority of the House of Representatives, after rejection by the opposition-controlled House of Councillors.
- March 13 – Nonlife insurers Sompo Japan Insurance and Nipponkoa Insurance essentially agree to integrate their businesses in April 2010.
- March 14 – Two JMSDF destroyers set sail for Somalia to patrol for pirates, embarking on the first overseas mission of its kind for Japan.
- March 19 – According to Fire and Disaster Management Agency official confirmed report, a Tamayura house for the elderly caught fire in Shibukawa, Gunma Prefecture, ten people died, one person was wounded.
- March 22 – The residence of former Prime Minister Shigeru Yoshida in Oiso, Kanagawa is destroyed by fire.
- March 23 – FedEx Express Flight 80 from Guangzhou, China, crashes on landing and burst into flames at Narita International Airport at 6:48 am, killing the pilot and copilot and closing the main runway for an entire day.
- March 31 – The largest Internet mall operator Rakuten asks the Tokyo Broadcasting System to buy back its 19.83 percent stake, putting an end to its long dispute with TBS over the proposal.

=== April ===
- April 1 – Okayama becomes 18th City designated by government ordinance.
- April 5 – North Korea launches its controversial Kwangmyŏngsŏng-2 rocket. The satellite passes over mainland Japan, prompting an immediate reaction from the United Nations Security Council, as well as participating states of Six-party talks.
- April 10 – The 50th Wedding anniversary of Emperor Akihito and Empress Michiko.
- April 21 – The Supreme Court rejects Masumi Hayashi's not-guilty plea and finalizes death sentence for killing four people with arsenic-laced curry at a local summer festival in Wakayama in 1998.
- April 28 – "EXPO Y150", celebrating 150th anniversary of the opening of the Port of Yokohama, is held until September 27.

=== May ===
- May 9 – 2009 flu pandemic:Three high-school students came back from Detroit, Michigan, United States to Narita International Airport are confirmed as first H1N1 influenza-infected case in Japan.
- May 11 – Osaka Regional Court sentences Tetsuya Komuro to three years in prison with a five-year suspended sentence for fraud.
- May 15 – Fukuoka High Court sentences former Fukuoka city office worker who drank a "considerable amount of alcohol" before causing a traffic accident that killed three children in 2006, to twenty years in prison, dismissing a 7 1/2-year term ruled by Fukuoka Regional Court.
- May 21 – Jury Law goes into effect.

=== June ===
- June 1 – A modification of the law on sales of medications takes effect. The law classifies products into three categories and allows over-the-counter sales of two at convenience-stores and supermarkets with a registered sales agent present, while requiring a pharmacist to oversee sales of the third category. Convenience stores begin sales of vitamins, analgesics and cold remedies.
- June 1 – Amended Road Traffic Law, which requires 75 years or older people to take mandatory cognitive function tests upon renewal of their licenses, goes into effect.
- June 4 – Tokyo Public Prosecutors Office decides to release Toshikazu Sugaya, who allegedly sentenced indefinite imprisonment for kidnapping and murdering a 4-year-old girl in Ashikaga, Tochigi, after 17 years of imprisonment, due to the result of fresh DNA test which proved that his case was false imprisonment.
- June 4 – Inauguration of Shizuoka Airport.
- June 16 – 10 climbers lost their lives in the Taisetsu mountain range in Hokkaido. Hokkaido Police raided the head office and a local branch of Amuse travel on suspicion of improper management of a guided tour on June 18.

=== July ===
- July 18 – Installation of "Kibo", the Japanese Experiment Module of the International Space Station, is completed.
- July 21 – Prime Minister of Japan Taro Aso dissolves the House of Representatives of Japan, setting the date for the 45th General Election as August 30.
- July 21 – A massive heavy rain, following considerable devastating flood and landslide in Hofu, Yamaguchi, claims 18 people's lives.
- July 22 – Total Solar eclipse is observed in Iwo Jima and over the water around there. It was not observed from Akusekijima, in which was supposed to have the longest ever lasting solar eclipse, due to stormy conditions over the island around the time of the total solar eclipse.
- July 31 – Astronaut Koichi Wakata returns to Earth aboard the Space Shuttle Endeavour after 138 days of stay in the International Space Station.

=== August ===
- August 3 – The first trial by jury for over 60 years, first time under the new Jury system, is started at the Tokyo Regional Court.
- August 10 – A massive heavy rain, following devastate flood and landslide in Sayo, Hyogo, which killed 18 people.
- August 11 – A strong earthquake with a magnitude of 6.5 struck Shizuoka Prefecture, killing one and more than 100 injured, part of the Tomei Expressway is collapsed due to landslide occurred right below.
- August 15 – 2009 flu pandemic:The first confirmed case of death by H1N1 influenza infection reported in Okinawa.

=== September ===
- September 2 – Miyuki Hatoyama, Japan's new first lady, speaks of riding a UFO to Venus, calling it "a very beautiful place" and "really green".
- September 9 – The Democratic Party of Japan agrees to form a coalition with two other parties, the Social Democratic Party and People's New Party.
- September 28 – A Japan Maritime Self-Defense Force (JMSDF) NAMC YS-11 a twin-engined turboprop transport crashed while landing at JMSDF Ozuki Air Field in Shimonoseki, Yamaguchi Prefecture, Japan. The landing in light rain, the aircraft suffered an overshoot of the runway and crashed through the airfield perimeter fence, crossing a service road and plunged nose-first into a rice field. The 11 JMSDF crew members of the aircraft were uninjured and the NAMC YS-11 aircraft suffered bent propellers.
- September 29 – Toyota launches a massive recall on many vehicles of its own, including those of its luxury brand, Lexus, relating to floor mats and how they may interfere with the functioning of the gas pedal.

=== October ===
- October 4 – Shōichi Nakagawa, the former Japanese Finance Minister who resigned over apparent drunken behaviour at the 2009 G7 meeting in Rome, is found dead in Tokyo.
- October 8 – At least two people are killed and dozens injured as Typhoon Melor makes landfall in Japan.
- October 26 – The trial of Japanese singer and actress Noriko Sakai begins in Tokyo.

=== November ===
- November 6 – Three people are hurt and a gunman takes his own life in a rare shooting incident in Yokohama, Japan.
- November 8 – Thousands of people in Okinawa, Japan protest, demanding the removal of a U.S. military base.
- November 12 – The discovery of two sunken World War II Japanese submarines off Oahu, Hawaii, is announced.
- November 13 – The Japan Coast Guard evacuates 28 passengers and crew from the Ariake commercial ferry after it rolls over onto its side in rough seas off Mie Prefecture in the Pacific Ocean.
- November 28 – Japan launches its fifth spy satellite on the H-IIA rocket from the Tanegashima Space Center.

=== December ===
- December 8 – Japan unveils a new ¥7.2 trillion (US$80.6 billion) stimulus package to strengthen the country's economy amid signs it is weakening.
- December 8 – A Japan Maritime Self-Defense Force Sikorsky HH-60H Seahawk Helicopter crashed and sank off the coast of Nagasaki. Two crewmembers were killed, while a third was rescued.

=== Prefectural elections ===
- January 25 – Yamagata gubernatorial election: Mieko Yoshimura, supported by Democrats, Social Democrats and Communists as well as some national level Liberal Democrats, narrowly beats LDP-supported incumbent governor Hiroshi Saitō. Gifu gubernatorial election: Incumbent Hajime Furuta wins reelection against only one Communist challenger.
- March 29 – Chiba gubernatorial election: Supported by parts of the Liberal Democratic Party, former actor Eiji Suzuki (stage name: Kensaku Morita) beats centre-left supported Taira Yoshida and three other contenders to succeed retiring two-term governor Akiko Dōmoto, a former Socialist Diet member.
- April 12 – Former Akita city mayor Norihisa Satake wins the Akita gubernatorial election against DPJ-supported Hiroshi Kawaguchi and two other candidates. Three-term governor Sukeshiro Terata had retired to eventually turn to national politics in 2010.
- July 5 – The Shizuoka gubernatorial election is held to elect a successor of Yoshinobu Ishikawa who had resigned over delays in the opening of the controversial Shizuoka airport. With support from centre-left parties, Heita Kawakatsu narrowly defeats centre-right supported former Councillor for Shizuoka Yukiko Sakamoto and two other candidates. In the Hyōgo gubernatorial election, governor Toshizō Ido is reelected with broad support from non-Communist parties.
- July 12 – In the most populous prefecture of Tokyo, the LDP suffers a major defeat, losing its status as strongest party in the assembly for the first time since the 1960s. The loss increases the pressure on LDP president Tarō Asō to resign or call early elections for the national lower house.
- August 30 – Ibaraki gubernatorial election: Masaru Hashimoto wins a fifth term against LDP supported Masato Obata and four other candidates.
- October 25 – In the Miyagi gubernatorial election, governor Yoshihiro Murai clearly defeats DPJ supported Yasuo Endō and a Communist to win a second term in office.
- November 8 – Former METI bureaucrat Hidehiko Yuzaki beats 4 other candidates in the Hiroshima gubernatorial election to succeed retiring Yūzan Fujita.

== Births ==
- December 5 – Sōya Kurokawa, actor

== Deaths ==
- January 3 – Hisayasu Nagata, politician (born 1969)
- March 1 – Takashi Ishimoto, butterfly swimmer (born 1935)
- March 8 – Takahiro Itō, actor and voice actor (born 1987)
- March 25 – Yukio Endō, gymnast (born 1937)
- May 26 – Kaoru Kurimoto, novelist (born 1953)
- June 11 – Sumire, model (born 1987)
- June 13 – Mitsuharu Misawa, wrestler (born 1962)
- June 22 – Jun Maki, copywriter (born 1948)
- June 27 – Nanae Sasaki, athlete (born 1956)
- July 5 – Takeo Doi, psychoanalyst (born 1920)
- July 21 – Yoshinori Kanada, animator (born 1952)
- August 3 – Reiko Ohara, actress (born 1946)
- August 9 – Jasmine You, musician (born 1979)
- August 18 – Hildegard Behrens, German opera singer (born 1937)
- September 11 – Yoshito Usui, manga artist
- October 4 – Shōichi Nakagawa, politician (born 1953)
- October 17 – Kazuhiko Katō, musician (born 1947)
- October 21 – Yōko Minamida, actress (born 1933)
- November 10 – Hisaya Morishige, actor and comedian (born 1913)
- November 13 – Hideo Den, news presenter and politician (born 1923)
- December 2 – Ikuo Hirayama, painter (born 1930)

== See also ==
- 2009 in Japanese music
- 2009 in Japanese television
- List of Japanese films of 2009
