= List of death row inmates in Japan =

The country of Japan has 100 people on death row as of 21 August 2026.

== List of death row inmates ==
Name	Crime	Time on death row	Notes
Shinji Aoba	Perpetrator of the Kyoto Animation arson attack, where 36 people died.	2 years, 301 days	Aoba committed the arson due to the belief that the animation studio had plagiarized his work.
Masanori Aoki	Perpetrator of the 2023 Nagano attack, in which he killed two women and two police officers responding to the attack.	1 year, 39 days	
Ryuta Arai	Drugged and drowned his uncle in 2008, and killed a woman a year later to steal their life insurance	14 years, 271 days	Accomplice was sentenced to life imprisonment.
Katsumi Asayama	Committed three arson-murders between 2010 and 2011 in an attempt to have his wife return to him.	13 years, 164 days	Asayama's wife, an accomplice in the third crime, received an 18-year sentence.
Chen Daiwei	Murdered two employees at a pachinko parlor during a failed robbery.	30 years, 342 days	Chinese illegal aliens and the first foreign nationals to be sentenced to death in Japan since 1964. A third accomplice, alleged to be the ringleader, fled overseas and is an internationally wanted fugitive.
He Li	Murdered two employees at a pachinko parlor during a failed robbery.	30 years, 342 days	Chinese illegal aliens and the first foreign nationals to be sentenced to death in Japan since 1964. A third accomplice, alleged to be the ringleader, fled overseas and is an internationally wanted fugitive.
Yutaro Chiba	Broke into his ex-girlfriend's home and stabbed to death her older sister and a former classmate.	15 years, 362 days	The ex-girlfriend and a male friend of her older sister were also stabbed, but survived.
Yuki Endo	Killed his ex-girlfriend's parents and set their house on fire in 2021.	2 years, 309 days	Withdrew his appeals a month after his conviction.
Tsune Eto	Murdered a married couple in Sakai.	25 years, 245 days	
Yukiharu Fuchigami	Killed an accomplice in a car insurance scam in March 1999, and then another man in September of that year.	23 years, 180 days	Suffers from muscular dystrophy
Masayasu Fujii	Ordered the murders of three people over monetary disputes between 1970 and 1973.	49 years, 236 days	His two accomplices were also sentenced to death initially, but had the sentences commuted to life on appeal.
Tomoko Fujinami	Kidnapped and killed a high school girl and a female office worker in February and March 1980, then made phone calls to demand ransom.	38 years, 286 days	A man named Hiroshi Kitano was arrested as her alleged accomplice, but was later found not guilty and exonerated. Fujinami is currently Japan's longest-serving female death row inmate.
Soji Fujisaki	Murdered two elderly women during separate robberies in January 2005.	20 years, 335 days	Alleged to be mentally-ill.
Ryoji Goto	Gangster who ordered the murders of two acquaintances to avoid being implicated in other crimes.	23 years, 271 days	Since his original conviction, Goto has confessed involvement in additional murders.
Kunihiko Hamakawa	Shot and killed an insurance agent and a trader in separate incidents in 1994, then stole money from their bank accounts.	23 years, 339 days	His accomplice Haruseki Kin was sentenced to life imprisonment for his role in the crimes
Shizuo Hasegawa	Hired a hitman to kill his younger brother to so he can acquire their deceased mother's inheritance.	19 years, 303 days	At the time of the crime, Hasegawa was on parole from a life sentence for a previous murder. The hitman, Katsumi Suzuki, received a 30-year sentence for his role in the murder.
Masumi Hayashi	Committed a mass poisoning at a 1998 summer festival by putting poison in a pot of curry. The poisoning killed two children and two adults.	23 years, 346 days	
Hiroaki Hida	Stabbed the president and managing director of a dried fish store during a robbery in 2012.	9 years, 363 days	Hida, a former employee at the store, claims he is innocent and is appealing to have a retrial.
Kazuo Hokao	Murdered his lover's husband in 1992 and one of her sons in 1998 to secure their insurance.	23 years, 295 days	His lover, Reiko Yamaguchi, was initially sentenced to death but later had her sentence reduced to life imprisonment.
Kosei Homi	Set ablaze multiple buildings in the town of Mitake in July 2013, killing five people.	11 years, 178 days	
Yoshitomo Hori	Murdered married couple Kazuo and Satomi Magoori during a robbery of their pachinko parlor in Owariasahi on June 28, 1998.	11 years, 7 days	He was linked to the crime years later via DNA. Hori later participated as an accomplice in the murder of Rie Isogai, for which he was sentenced to life imprisonment.
Hiroyuki Ikeda	Murdered the owners of a mahjong parlor over a drug smuggling dispute, dismembering them alive with an electric saw.	16 years, 6 days	Multiple accomplices were convicted and received lesser sentences, while another remains a wanted fugitive. First death sentence to be passed by a lay judge in the country.
Hayato Imai	Murdered at least three elderly patients at a nursing home from November to December 2014, where he worked as a nurse.	8 years, 245 days	
Takeo Inokuma	Former police officer who murdered five people in the vicinity of Lake Yamanaka in October 1984.	39 years, 139 days	Inokuma asserts that he was forced to commit the killings on behalf of a loan shark.
Keiko Ishikawa	Murdered two women in Miyazaki Prefecture in 1994 and 1996.	25 years, 155 days	
Tomohiro Iwakura	Strangled to death four family members and a male neighbor between March and April 2018.	5 years, 346 days	
Toshiaki Kaga	Stabbed and strangled a mother and her daughter at their home in Isehara, then withdrew money from their bank accounts.	22 years, 291 days	
Masaharu Kamimiya	Stabbed to death a police officer during a robbery, stole his gun, and then killed a store clerk in another robbery.	38 years, 28 days	Neither of the murder weapons were never recovered, and Kamimiya continues to insist that he is innocent.
Yukio Kaneiwa	Murdered two girlfriends in 1999 and 2003, dismembering their remains afterwards.	19 years, 272 days	
Hajime Kanekawa	Stabbed to death a 21-year-old housewife in Kumamoto during an attempted rape.	43 years, 250 days	The crime was committed shortly after he was released from prison for a 1969 murder conviction. Kanekawa was originally sentenced to life imprisonment, but this was changed to a death sentence on appeal.
Tatsuya Kawasaki	Murdered two acquaintances in separate incidents in January and July 2016.	8 years, 272 days	Withdrew his appeals and his death sentence finalized.
Hiroko Kazama	Together with her husband, Gen Sekine and a third accomplice, murdered at least four people who wanted to purchase dogs from their home in Kumagaya from April to August 1993.	25 years, 246 days	The trio were suspected of several other murders, but were never charged. Sekine died on death row in 2017, and the accomplice, Eikō Yamazaki, turned state's witness.
Kanae Kijima	Convicted for poisoning three would-be husbands and suspected of four more, spanning from 2007 to 2009.	9 years, 222 days	Also known as "The Konkatsu Killer", for her frequenting of "konkatsu" (marriage-hunting) websites.
Mami Kitamura	Murdered four people between September 18 to 20, 2004.	19 years, 267 days	All four members of the family were part of the Kitamura-gumi gang.
Jitsuo Kitamura	Murdered four people between September 18 to 20, 2004.	19 years, 267 days	All four members of the family were part of the Kitamura-gumi gang.
Takashi Kitamura	Murdered four people between September 18 to 20, 2004.	19 years, 267 days	All four members of the family were part of the Kitamura-gumi gang.
Takahiro Kitamura	Murdered four people between September 18 to 20, 2004.	19 years, 267 days	All four members of the family were part of the Kitamura-gumi gang.
Masato Kobayashi	Leaders of a gang of youths who raped and murdered three people across three prefectures over a period of 11 days.	25 years, 136 days	
Masayoshi Haga	Leaders of a gang of youths who raped and murdered three people across three prefectures over a period of 11 days.	21 years, 119 days	Both Haga and Kurosawa were initially sentenced to life imprisonment, but their sentences were commuted to death on appeal.
Atsushi Kurosawa	Leaders of a gang of youths who raped and murdered three people across three prefectures over a period of 11 days.	21 years, 119 days	Both Haga and Kurosawa were initially sentenced to life imprisonment, but their sentences were commuted to death on appeal.
Hirofumi Komatsu	Stabbed to death his wife and five children at their home in Hitachi, then set the house on fire.	2 years, 145 days	
Takeshi Koizumi	Stabbed to death civil servant Takehiko Yamaguchi and his wife during a home invasion.	16 years, 237 days	Also attacked another civil servant, Kenji Yoshihara, who survived. Koizumi, a diagnosed schizophrenic, claimed that the attack was carried out as revenge for the government euthanizing his pet dog.
Masataka Kurayoshi	Murdered a man and a woman during a failed robbery in Fukuoka.	27 years, 242 days	
Kazuya Kuwata	Murdered his girlfriend in 2005, followed by his wife in 2010.	15 years, 153 days	
Lin Shinka	Murdered a woman and her son who interrupted him during a burglary in their house.	11 years, 275 days	Chinese national. He also attacked another one of the sons, who survived the attack.
Hiromi Manaka	Murdered two classmates in August and September 1989.	32 years, 139 days	
Tomohiro Matsubara	Murdered a family of three in 2010.	15 years, 242 days	Three accomplices in the crime received lesser sentences.
Kazufumi Ito	Murdered a family of three in 2010.	14 years, 330 days	Three accomplices in the crime received lesser sentences.
Kenji Matsumoto	Murdered two people during separate robberies in September 1990 and September 1991.	33 years, 66 days	Alleged to be mentally-ill due to being born with Minamata disease.
Futoshi Matsunaga	Defrauded, tortured and murdered seven to nine people between 1996 and 1998.	21 years, 55 days	His accomplice, Junko Ogata, received a life sentence.
Nobuyuki Morimoto	Murdered two Filipina women.	26 years, 266 days	One of his accomplices' death sentences was later reduced to life, while the other died before the trial could conclude.
Masami Mukai	Murdered two women in separate attacks in Shizuoka and Aichi from 1996 to 1997.	26 years, 126 days	Alleges that he is innocent for one of the murders, claiming that the police tortured him into confessing.
Seiichiro Muramatsu	Strangled a mother and her adult son during a failed robbery, then set their house ablaze.	41 years, 57 days	His younger brother was sentenced to life imprisonment.
Katsuhisa Naga	Suffocated his ex-wife when she refused to reconcile with him; later killed a female acquaintance after several days of torture to satisfy his sadistic fetishes.	24 years, 339 days	
Sumio Nakahara	Ordered the murders of two Taishu-kai members due to an internal dispute.	23 years, 205 days	
Mitsuru Nakata	Police officer who murdered his wife and two children in Ogori in 2017.	6 years, 344 days	Due to the fact that the evidence is mostly circumstantial, some allege that Nakata is innocent.
Munehiro Nishiguchi	Murdered two women in separate robberies in November and December 2011.	12 years, 257 days	
Shōzō Nishiyama	Murdered an elderly woman in the mountains near Fukuyama to steal her credit cards.	22 years, 213 days	Crime was committed while on parole from a life sentence for a previous murder. Originally sentenced to life, later commuted to death on appeal. Was tried twice before and received a life sentence both times prior to a third retrial, in which he was resentenced to death.
Nobuo Oda	Murder of two employees at an electronics retail store in Fukuoka.	57 years, 333 days	A juvenile accomplice was sentenced to 13 years imprisonment. Oda is Japan's longest-serving death row inmate. He is currently 79 years old.
Kazuhiro Ogawa	Murdered 16 people in an arson attack on an adult video arcade.	16 years, 340 days	Ogawa told police that he started the fire after deciding to kill himself, but he got scared, and ran away as smoke filled his room.
Hideaki Ogoshi	Murdered his common-law wife's four family members because they convinced her to break up with him over his gambling debts.	41 years, 175 days	Ogoshi claims that his ex-wife was the true killer, and that he was framed for the murders.
Shosan Ohama	Murdered a woman and her two daughters in Hiratsuka because of his sensitivity to noise.	51 years, 33 days	Japan's oldest serving inmate. Withdrew his appeals in 1977, but has never been executed due to concerns about his mental health and advanced age. He is currently 98 years old.
Kenji Ohashi	Murdered two women in Osaka and Gifu in separate robberies.	20 years, 20 days	
Akihiro Okumoto	Murdered his wife, 5-month-old son and mother-in-law	16 years, 15 days	
Osamu Okura	Murdered a colleague and his wife in separate incidents in 2004 and 2005.	19 years, 289 days	
Katsuhisa Omori	East Asia Anti-Japan Armed Front terrorist who bombed a government building in Hokkaido, killing two people and injuring at least 80 others.	43 years, 238 days	Amnesty International alleges that Omori was convicted on flimsy testimony and is actually innocent.
Takayuki Ōtsuki	Murdered, robbed and raped 23-year-old Yayoi Motomura and murdered Motomura's 11-month-old daughter, Yuka.	18 years, 214 days	Sentenced to death although he was not of the age of maturity (20 years of age in Japan) at that time (18 years). Successfully re-sentenced to death after the prosecution team successfully appealed his initial sentence of life imprisonment.
Kiyotaka Oyama	Murdered his wife and father in October 1998 and March 2000, respectively, to collect their life insurance.	21 years, 209 days	
Masayoshi Ozaki	Murdered two people in January 2002 to collect their life insurance.	21 years, 190 days	
Tadashi Hara	Murdered two people in January 2002 to collect their life insurance.	21 years, 190 days	
Tetsuya Sasaki	Murdered his parents because they disapproved of his relationship with a woman working at a brothel.	42 years, 252 days	
Hiroshi Sakaguchi	Murdered two policemen and another person during a shootout with police in a holiday lodge below Mount Asama.	44 years, 157 days	He is a member of the United Red Army and was involved in the murder of 14 other members of the terrorist organization.
Shoichi Sato	Murdered 79-year-old Takako Yamana and 51-year-old son Hiroyuki at their home in Usa during a robbery.	2 years, 143 days	
Masakazu Shibasaki	Stabbed to death two police officers at a police station in a failed attempt to steal a handgun for a planned bank robbery.	35 years, 179 days	
Eiichi Shimoura	Murdered three people in Japan and the Philippines for insurance fraud between 1994 and 1996.	24 years, 296 days	
Shinichi Shimoyama	Murdered three people as part of a robbery gang active between October and December 1993.	28 years, 180 days	
Wong Yee sun	Murdered three people as part of a robbery gang active between October and December 1993.	30 years, 126 days	Malaysian citizen.
Mineo Suga	Defrauded and murdered two men in a scheme involving fictitious transactions on construction projects.	22 years, 256 days	
Katsuaki Suzuki	Killed the former president of a textile manufacturing company and his wife in 2004, then stuffed their bodies in an oil drum can.	13 years, 149 days	The victims' bodies were found in 2009, and Suzuki was charged shortly afterwards. He claimed to have disposed of the bodies at the behest of an unknown third party.
Akihiko Takahashi	Stabbed to death a married couple in Aizuwakamatsu during a botched robbery.	13 years, 253 days	
Suguru Takahashi	Gang leader who orchestrated the robbery and subsequent murders of two money lenders in 2001 and 2002.	22 years, 242 days	
Yasushi Takao	Pyromaniac who set fires to various homes around Tateyama from 1998 to 2003, killing five people.	21 years, 274 days	
Kazuya Takayanagi	Bludgeoned to death his girlfriend Mika Hatafuji and her friend Yoshimi Tanigawa, who witnessed the crime, and then dismembered their remains.	17 years, 250 days	
Atsuhiko Tanaka	Murdered two right-wing politicians in politically motivated attacks between 1992 and 1994.	26 years, 251 days	Originally sentenced to life imprisonment, commuted to death on appeal.
Gota Tsutsui	Murdered the mother and grandmother of a woman he was stalking.	13 years, 161 days	
Kazuya Tsuchiya	Murdered three elderly people during robberies in November and December 2014.	10 years, 125 days	
Yoshinori Ueda	Perpetrator of the "Osaka Dog Lover Murders", in which he fatally poisoned five people with suxamethonium.	28 years, 249 days	
Satoshi Uematsu	Perpetrated a mass stabbing that led to the deaths of 19 disabled people.	6 years, 251 days	Uematsu was a former worker at the care facility where the incident occurred.
Takashi Uemura	Hired gunman who murdered three people from 2010 to 2011.	7 years, 252 days	Recorded as the longest lay judge trial in the country's history, lasting a total of 207 days. His accomplice was sentenced to life imprisonment. Two of the victims' bodies have not been found.
Junichi Watanabe	Murdered three accomplices in a fictitious billing fraud scheme	13 years, 297 days	Originally sentenced to life, commuted to death on appeal.
Taishi Shimizu	Murdered three accomplices in a fictitious billing fraud scheme	19 years, 107 days	
Reo Ito	Murdered three accomplices in a fictitious billing fraud scheme	19 years, 185 days	
Kiyoshi Watanabe	Murdered four sex workers between 1967 and 1973.	48 years, 176 days	Originally sentenced to life imprisonment, which was commuted to a death sentence on appeal.
Tsuyoshi Watanabe	Murdered a wealthy investment fund manager and his wife in order to obtain their credit cards.	12 years, 227 days	Charges were dropped against multiple alleged accomplices due to lack of evidence to implicate them.
Koji Yamada	Kidnapped and murdered two high school students in August 2015.	7 years, 339 days	Withdrew his appeals and had his death sentence finalized.
Xie Yidi	Murdered 64-year-old Isamu Hayakawa, an owner of a noodle factory, and his 57-year-old wife Yoko during a robbery.	20 years, 51 days	Chinese national.
Xue Song	Murdered a Chinese woman and her husband in Kasukabe when she rejected his romantic advances.	24 years, 273 days	Chinese national. Has appealed for a retrial, alleging there were procedural mistakes in his original trial.
Shigeru Yagi	Orchestrated the fatal poisonings of two customers at his hostess club in Honjō from 1995 to 1999.	24 years, 51 days	His three female accomplices were also convicted and received lesser sentences. Additionally attempted to murder a third man and is suspected to be involved in a third suspicious death dating back to 1989.
Kenichiro Yamada	Sumiyoshi-kai gangster who murdered a rival gang member and three bystanders during a shooting at a snack bar in Maebashi in 2003.	19 years, 185 days	His accomplice Masato Kohinata died on death row in 2026.
Morio Yamaguchi	Murdered an antique dealer during a robbery, then killed one of his accomplices.	25 years, 161 days	His other accomplice died before the trial could conclude. Originally sentenced to death in 1997, but granted a retrial and was initially sentenced to life. This was later commuted to the death sentence again in 2001.
Kenji Yokota	Murdered a female acquaintance and then dismembered her corpse.	24 years, 53 days	Crime committed after parole from a life sentence for a previous murder. Originally sentenced to life imprisonment, but commuted to death on appeal.
Hiroshi Zohta	Murdered two people and injured six others during an unprovoked attack in Ikebukuro in 1999.	24 years, 308 days	Zohta claimed that the attack was carried out due to his disillusionment with Japanese society.

== See also ==
- Death row
- Capital punishment in Japan
- List of executions in Japan
- List of death row inmates in the United States
