= 2022 in Japan =

- Decades: 2000s; 2010s; 2020s; 2030s
- See also: Other events of 2022; History of Japan • Timeline • Years

Events in the year 2022 in Japan.

== Incumbents ==
- Emperor: Naruhito
- Prime Minister: Fumio Kishida
- Chief Cabinet Secretary: Hirokazu Matsuno
- Chief Justice of Japan: Naoto Ōtani
- Speaker of the House of Representatives: Tadamori Ōshima
- President of the House of Councillors: Akiko Santō

=== Governors ===
- Aichi Prefecture: Hideaki Omura
- Akita Prefecture: Norihisa Satake
- Aomori Prefecture: Shingo Mimura
- Chiba Prefecture: Toshihito Kumagai
- Ehime Prefecture: Tokihiro Nakamura
- Fukui Prefecture: Tatsuji Sugimoto
- Fukuoka Prefecture: Seitaro Hattori
- Fukushima Prefecture: Masao Uchibori
- Gifu Prefecture: Hajime Furuta
- Gunma Prefecture: Ichita Yamamoto
- Hiroshima Prefecture: Hidehiko Yuzaki
- Hokkaido: Naomichi Suzuki
- Hyogo Prefecture: Motohiko Saitō
- Ibaraki Prefecture: Kazuhiko Ōigawa
- Ishikawa: Masanori Tanimoto
- Iwate Prefecture: Takuya Tasso
- Kagawa Prefecture: Keizō Hamada
- Kagoshima Prefecture: Kōichi Shiota
- Kanagawa Prefecture: Yuji Kuroiwa
- Kumamoto Prefecture: Ikuo Kabashima
- Kochi Prefecture: Seiji Hamada
- Kyoto Prefecture: Takatoshi Nishiwaki
- Mie Prefecture: Eikei Suzuki
- Miyagi Prefecture: Yoshihiro Murai
- Miyazaki Prefecture: Shunji Kōno
- Nagano Prefecture: Shuichi Abe
- Nagasaki Prefecture: Hōdō Nakamura
- Nara Prefecture: Shōgo Arai
- Niigata Prefecture: Hideyo Hanazumi
- Oita Prefecture: Katsusada Hirose
- Okayama Prefecture: Ryuta Ibaragi
- Okinawa Prefecture: Denny Tamaki
- Osaka Prefecture: Ichirō Matsui
- Saga Prefecture: Yoshinori Yamaguchi
- Saitama Prefecture: Motohiro Ōno
- Shiga Prefecture: Taizō Mikazuki
- Shimame Prefecture: Tatsuya Maruyama
- Shizuoka Prefecture: Heita Kawakatsu
- Tochigi Prefecture: Tomikazu Fukuda
- Tokushima Prefecture: Kamon Iizumi
- Tokyo Prefecture: Yuriko Koike
- Tottori Prefecture: Shinji Hirai
- Toyama Prefecture: Hachiro Nitta
- Wakayama Prefecture: Yoshinobu Nisaka
- Yamagata Prefecture: Mieko Yoshimura
- Yamaguchi Prefecture: Tsugumasa Muraoka
- Yamanashi Prefecture: Kotaro Nagasaki

== Predicted and scheduled events ==
=== January ===
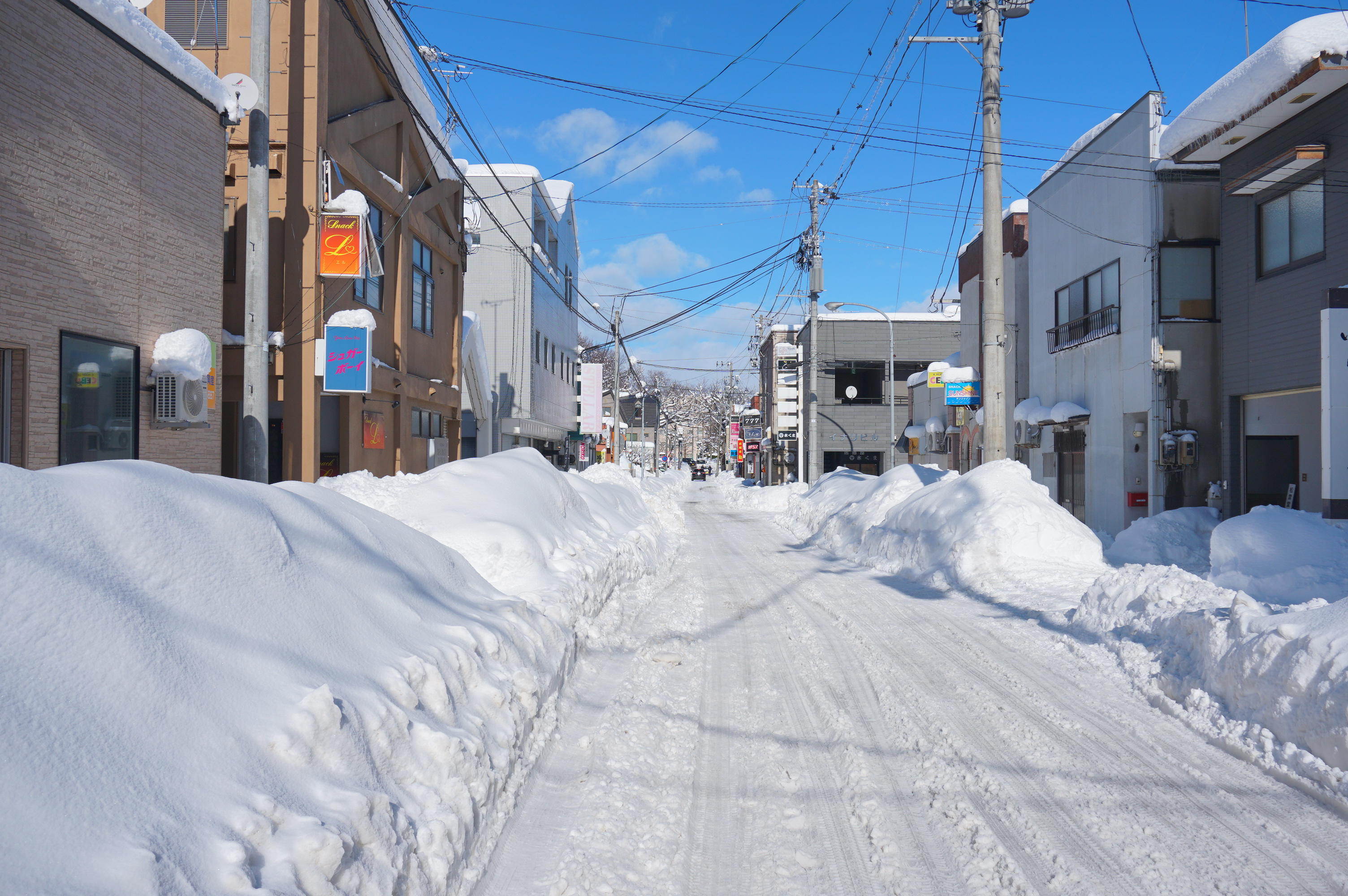
Snowy street in Noshiro, Akita Prefecture, on January 21, 2022

- January and February – Winter thunderstorm and heavy snow. There were at least 93 human fatalities and 1,580 injuries, according to Japan Fire and Disaster Management Agency.
- January 15 – According to a Tokyo Metropolitan Police Department report, a 1.7-decade-old student attacked 3 people with a knife outside of University of Tokyo, Bunkyo, Tokyo
- January 22 – According to USGS report, a 6.3 magnitude earthquake hit near costal Saiki, Oita, southeastern Kyushu Island, followed by aftershocks. 13 people were wounded according to the Japan Fire and Disasters Management Agency.

=== February ===
- February 4 to 20 – Japanese athletes compete in the 2022 Winter Olympics in Beijing.
- February 11 – A rice cracker confectionery manufacturing factory caught fire in Murakami, Niigata Prefecture, and six factory workers died.
- February 27 – Former prime minister Shinzo Abe proposed that Japan should consider a nuclear sharing arrangement with the US similar to NATO. This includes housing American nuclear weapons on Japanese soil for deterrence. This plan comes in the wake of the 2022 Russian invasion of Ukraine.

=== March ===
Fukushima earthquake

- March 16 – 2022 Fukushima earthquake.
- March 27 – A submarine volcano erupted on Funka-asane, North Iwo Jima, Bonin Islands, where ash rose up to 23,000 feet (7,000 meters), according to a Japan Meteorological Agency official confirmed report.

=== April ===
- April 10 – In Nippon Professional Baseball (NPB), Chiba Lotte Marines pitcher Rōki Sasaki throws a perfect game, the first in 28 years and the 16th in NPB history. Sasaki tied an existing NPB record by striking out 19 batters, and set a new record by striking out 13 consecutive batters.
- April 23 – According to a Japan Coast Guard official confirmed report, a sightseeing ferry, Kazu I, sank nearby Shiretoko Peninsula, Hokkaido. In total, 26 people died.

=== May ===
- May 3–5 – Many traditional Golden Week festivals are resumed including Hakata Dontaku, Hamamatsu Kite Festival, Hiroshima Flower Festival, and among others, and held across the nationwide for the first time (since 2019) after the first 20 months and one year of COVID-19 pandemic.
- May 9 – According to a Tokyo Firefighter Department official confirmed report, a house caught fire in Higashimurayama, Tokyo in an incident caused by suicide arson. Four people were killed in the fire.
- May 11 – The Economic Security Promotion Law was enacted by the House of Councillors. This will be implemented in stages starting from April 2023.

=== June ===
- June 2–3 – According to Japan Meteorological Agency and Japan Weather News Television official confirmed report, a massive hail fallen in Gunma, Saitama, Chiba Prefecture, according to Japan Fire and Disaster Management Agency report, 91 persons were hurt.
- June 19 – According to USGS official confirmed report, a Richer scale 5.1 magnitude earthquake hit on Noto Peninsula, Ishikawa Prefecture, total seven persons were wounded, according to JFDMA official confirmed report.
- June 25 – According to Japan Meteorological Agency official confirmed report, a Celsius 40.2 degrees (Fahrenheit 104.36 degrees) high temperature record hit in Isesaki, Gunma Prefecture, as highest temperature record on June in Japan, since first observation record of JMA, since 1872, as same place another Celsius 40.0 (Fahrenheit 104.0 degrees) recorded observed on June 29.

=== July ===
- July 8 – Former Japanese prime minister Shinzo Abe was shot dead in the western city Nara, Kansai region.
- July 8 to September 30 – Japan declared the national mourning day of former Japanese prime minister Shinzo Abe, who was assassinated while he giving a speech at the House of Councillors election campaign in Nara.
- July 11 – Following Shinzo Abe's assassination, Japanese government discussed that Unification Church leader Tomihiro Tanaka has confirmed Tetsuya Yamagami's mother was a member of the religious group (Also known as the Unification Church (Shukyo nisei)). Because Shinzo Abe had alleged ties to the Unification Church, which go back generations including his father, Shintaro Abe, his mother Yoko Abe, and his maternal grandparents, Nobusuke and Yoshiko Kishi. At the end of World War II, his maternal grandfather was jailed as a suspected war criminal.
- July 12 – Former Japanese prime minister Shinzo Abe was cremated at Kirigaya Funeral Hall in Tokyo.
- July 14 to August 16 – According to official confirmed report, a many summer traditional festival and event were resumed including Akita Kantō, Aomori Nebuta, Tokushima Awa Dance Festival, Gion Festival, and Gozan no Okuribi in both Kyoto, Gujo-Hachiman Bon Dance Festival, Hakata Gion Yamakasa, and among others after the first 20 months and 1 year of COVID-19 pandemic. However, Osaka Tenjin Festival, Niigata Festival were scale down held, but Sumida River Firework Festival, Hachiōji Festival, Tanba Dekansho Dance Festival and Kumamoto Hinokuni Festival were not held for three consecutive years.
- July 25 – According to the Ministry of Health, Labor and Welfare reports, Japan has confirmed the first case of monkeypox outbreak in Tokyo, but Japanese public health experts are said it is unlikely to cause a new surge.

=== August ===
- August 10 – Japanese prime minister Fumio Kishida announced the reshuffled his second cabinet.
- August 13 – Tropical Thunderstorm Meari hits Shizuoka.
- August 22 – According to Japan National Police Agency official confirmed report, a regular route bus has overturned, following caught fire in Nagoya Expressway, Kita-ku, Nagoya, two persons were human fatalities and seven persons were wounded.

=== September ===
- September 16–November 13 According to official confirmed report, a many autumn traditional festival resume in nationwide, including Kishiwada Danjiri Matsuri, Nada's Fighting Festival of Himeji, Saijō Festival of Ehime Prefecture, Aging Festival of Kyoto, Saga International Balloon Fiesta, Karatsu Kunchi, Chrysanthemum Doll event and Tochigi Autumn Festival, all of since 2019, however Kanuma Autumn Festival and Nagasaki Kunchi were cancelled for three consecutive years.

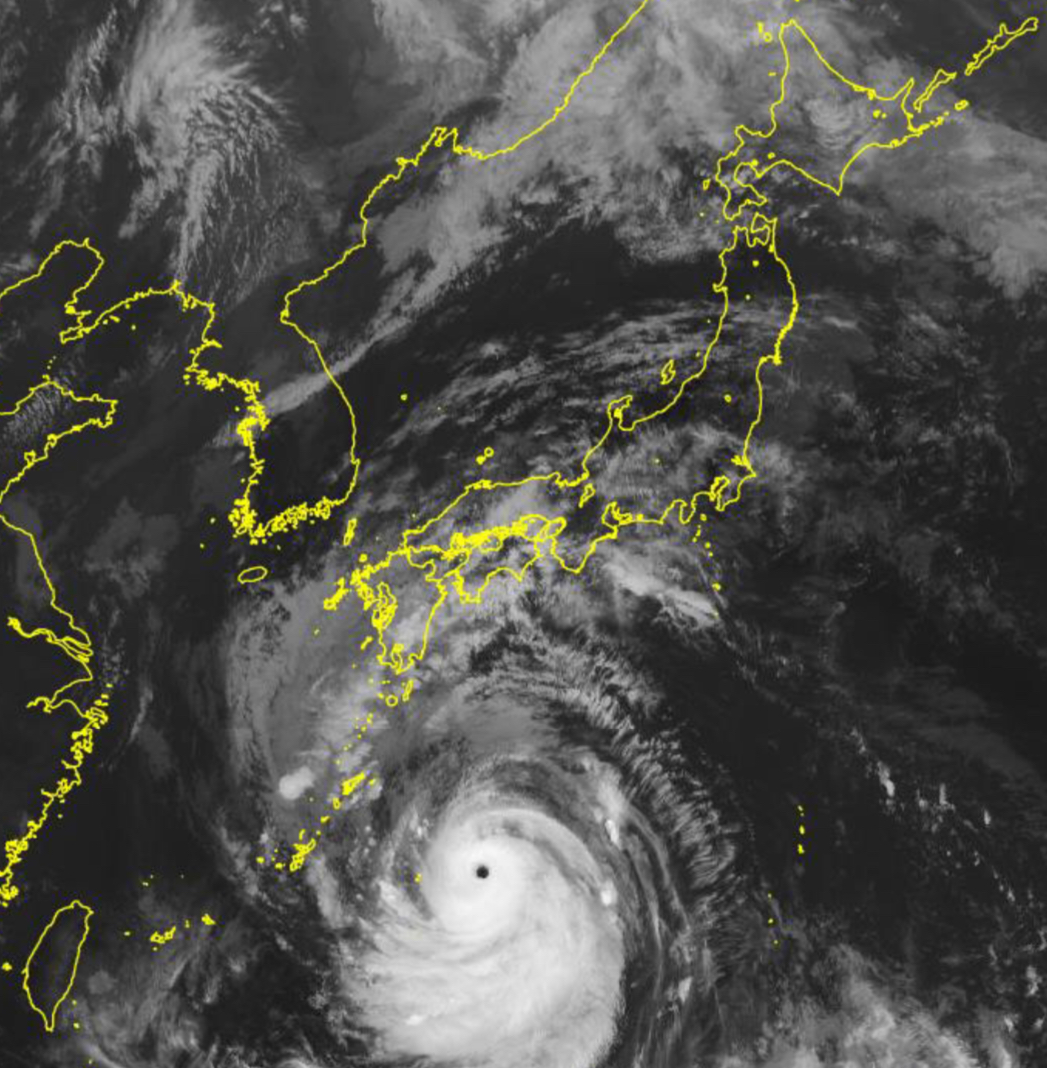
Typhoon Nanmadol approaching Japan

- September 17–20 – Typhoon Nanmadol, a heavy massive precipitation and landslide hit in southern Kyushu Island and other western Japan, total four persons were death and 147 persons injures, according to Japan Fire and Disaster Management Agency official confirmed report.
- September 23–24 Typhoon Talas, a torrential massive heavy rain, landslide, flash flood hit, two transmission towers collapse hit in Shizuoka Prefecture, total three persons were human fatalities, six persons wounded, according to JFDMA official confirmed report.
- September 27 – Funeral service of former Japanese prime minister Shinzo Abe begin at Nippon Budokan, Kitanomaru National Garden in Chiyoda, Tokyo.
- September 28 to December 31 – According to the Ministry of the Environment's official report, 143 cases of wild birds on nationwide, as crows, cranes, and swans were confirmed, and the Tobu Zoological Park in Saitama Prefecture, where many wild birds were confirmed, was closed from December 22, and the amusement area has resumed on December 29.

=== October ===
- October 9 – Racing driver Max Verstappen wins Japanese Grand Prix. Second title world champion 2022 Formula One World Championship.
- October 28 to December 31 – According to a report by the Ministry of Agriculture, Forestry and Fisheries, 50 cases of bird flu have been reported in Japan in chickens and ducks raised on poultry farms in nationwide, total 7.63 millions sluggered by Japan Ground Self-Defense Force.

=== November ===
- November 1 – Ghibli Park, owned by Studio Ghibli, officially opens in Nagakute, Aichi Prefecture.
- November 22 – Japan begins investigation into the Unification Church, just four months following the assassination of former prime minister Shinzo Abe, who allegedly by Tetsuya Yamagami with a longstanding grudge against the religious group.

=== December ===
- December 25 – According to Japan National Police Agency official confirmed report, a suspect has three murdered with hammer in Hannō, Saitama Prefecture, a suspicion has arrested on same day,
- December 27 – According to Tokyo Fire Department official confirmed report, a fire and explosion occurred at a chemical factory and warehouse in Sumida, Tokyo, destroying 10 facilities and buildings, an employee has injures.
- December 29 – Following China's recent decision to end its Zero-COVID strategy, Japanese Health, Labor and Welfare Minister Katsunobu Kato says the possibility of imposing travel restrictions on visitors from the Greater China is 'under the review'. The following day, Japanese Health, Labor and Welfare Ministry has confirmed that passengers arriving in Japan from Greater China will have to provide a negative test before they board a flight.
- December 31 – Japanese New Year has second returned since December 2021 after the first 20 months of COVID-19 pandemic in January 2020 and September 2021. However, a many Japanese people remain celebrated New Year's Eve after midnight.

== Arts and entertainment ==
- 2022 in anime
- 2022 in Japanese music
- 2022 in Japanese television
- List of 2022 box office number-one films in Japan
- List of Japanese films of 2022

== Sports ==
- September 25 – 2022 MotoGP World Championship is held at 2022 Japanese motorcycle Grand Prix
- October 9 – 2022 Formula One World Championship is held at 2022 Japanese Grand Prix
- 2022 F4 Japanese Championship
- 2022 Super Formula Championship
- 2022 Super Formula Lights
- 2022 Super GT Series
- 2022 EAFF E-1 Football Championship (Japan)
- 2022 in Japanese football
- 2022 J1 League
- 2022 J2 League
- 2022 J3 League
- 2022 Japan Football League
- 2022 Japanese Regional Leagues
- 2022 Japanese Super Cup
- 2022 Emperor's Cup
- 2022 J.League Cup

== Deaths ==
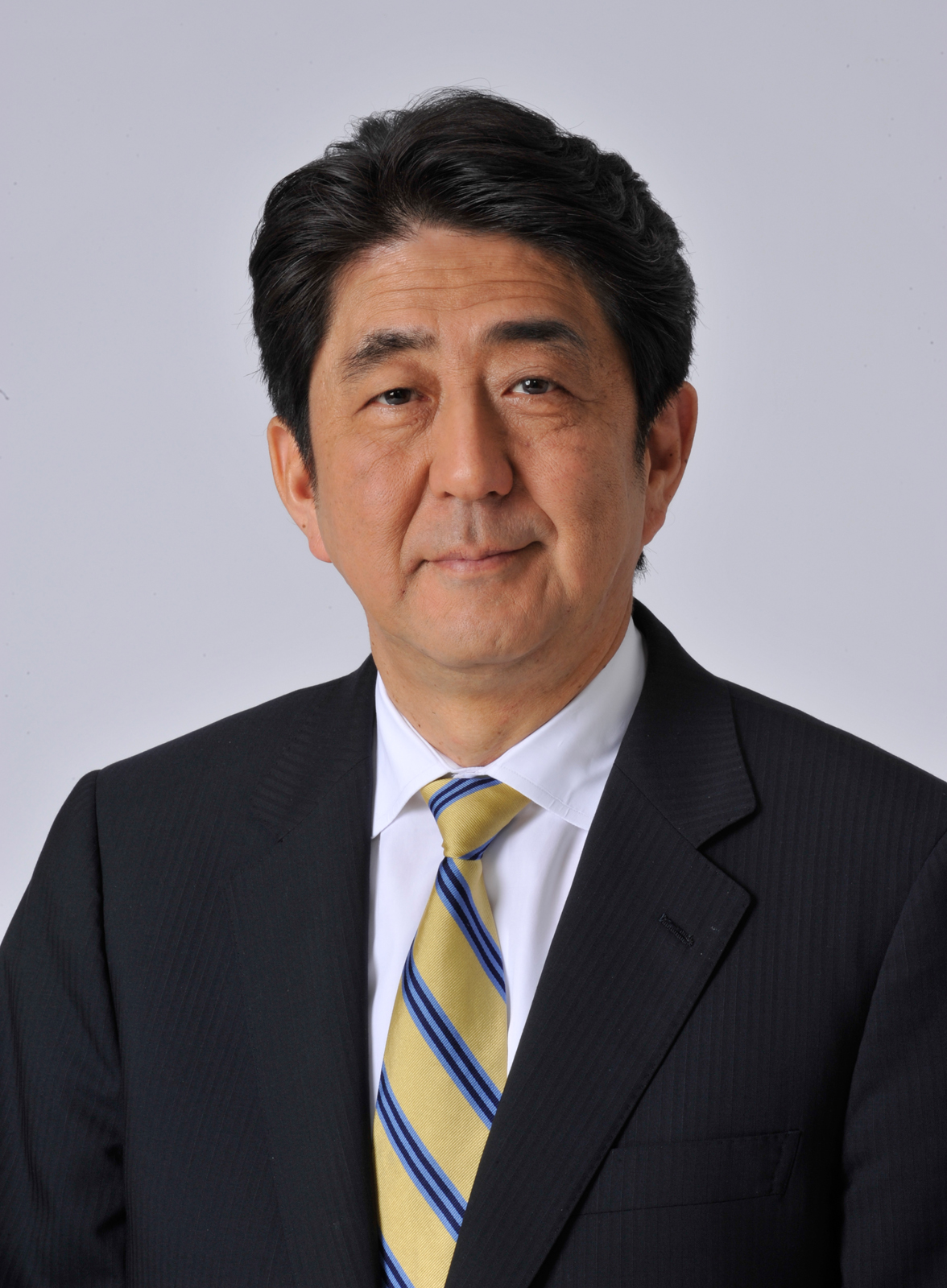
Shinzo Abe, former two-time Prime Minister of Japan from 2006 and 2007 and again from 2012 to 2020, was assassinated while he giving a speech at the upper election campaign in Nara, which had increased media scrutiny.

In the fourth year of Reiwa Memoriam despite Japanese demographic and aging crisis (and during the first 16-month-period of COVID-19 Omicron variant) in the country, among top 12 famous Japanese people who died due to illness and old age, including Toshiki Kaifu, Shintaro and Noriko Ishihara, Jun Kondō, Akira Takarada, Nobuyuki Idei, Yoko Shimada, Issey Miyake, Hanae Mori, Kazuo Inamori, Antonio Inoki, Ichiro Mizuki, and Chika Takami. Among top 5 famous Japanese people who died of tragic events, including Hiroyuki Watanabe and Ryuhei Ueshima both from suicides, Yu-Gi-Oh! creator Kazuki Takahashi from accidental drowning, former Japanese prime minister Shinzo Abe from murder, and Kōji Nakamoto from traffic accident.

=== January ===
- January 8 – Kazuo Takahashi, politician (b. 1930)
- January 9
  - Toshiki Kaifu, politician (b. 1931)
  - Akira Inoue, film director (b. 1928)
- January 10 – Shinji Mizushima, manga artist (b. 1939)
- January 29 – Kohei Yoshiyuki, photographer (b. 1946)

=== February ===
- February 1 – Shintaro Ishihara, politician and writer (b. 1932)
- February 8 – Toshiya Ueda, voice actor (b. 1933)
- February 20 – Teruhiko Saigō, singer and actor (b. 1947)
- February 26 – Yūsuke Kawazu, actor (b. 1935)
- February 28 – Norihiro Inoue, actor (b. 1958)

=== March ===
- March 3 – Kyotaro Nishimura, novelist (b. 1930)
- March 5 – Taro Shigaki, actor (b. 1951)
- March 8 – Noriko Ishihara, essay writer and the wife of Shintaro Ishihara (b. 1933 or 1938)
- March 11 – Jun Kondō, theoretical physicist (b. 1930)
- March 14 – Akira Takarada, actor (b. 1934)
- March 16 – Kunimitsu Takahashi, former professional motorcycle, racing driver and team manager (b. 1940)
- March 17 – Tadao Sato, film critic (b. 1930)
- March 21 – Shinji Aoyama, film director (b. 1964)
- March 31 – Kei Yamamoto, actor (b. 1940)

=== April ===
- April 7 – Fujiko A. Fujio, manga artist (b. 1934)
- April 8 – Minori Matsushima, voice actress (b. 1940)
- April 18 – Shirō Sasaki, film producer (b. 1939)
- April 19 – Kane Tanaka, supercentenarian (oldest verified Japanese person and the second oldest verified person ever) (b. 1903)

=== May ===
- May 3 – Hiroyuki Watanabe, actor (b. 1955)
- May 11 – Ryuhei Ueshima, comedian (b. 1961)
- May 14 – Ryo Kawamura, television announcer (b. 1967)
- May 22 – Takashi Ishii, film director (b. 1946)

=== June ===
- June 2 – Nobuyuki Idei, businessman (b. 1937)
- June 4 – Hajime Ishii, politician (b. 1934)
- June 11 – Kumiko Takizawa, voice actress (b. 1952)
- June 23 – Chumei Watanabe, composer (b. 1925)
- June 27
  - Teruyoshi Nakano, special effects director (b. 1935)
  - Yuki Katsuragi, singer (b. 1949)
- June 28 – Asao Sano, actor (b. 1925)

=== July ===
- July 1 – Akiko Nomura, actress (b. 1927)
- July 6 – Kazuki Takahashi, manga artist of Yu-Gi-Oh! (b. 1961)
- July 8 – Shinzo Abe, politician (b. 1954)
- July 10 – Hirohisa Fujii, politician (b. 1932)
- July 16 – Wakanohana Kanji II, sumo wrestler (b. 1953)
- July 25 – Yoko Shimada, actress (b. 1953)
- July 30 – Kiyoshi Kobayashi, voice actor (b. 1933)

=== August ===
- August 1 – Hiroshi Ōtake, voice actor (b. 1932)
- August 5 – Issei Miyake, fashion designer (b. 1938)
- August 9 – Akiko Shimamura, actress (b. 1933)
- August 11 – Hanae Mori, fashion designer (b. 1926)
- August 15 – Tsuneko Sasamoto, photojournalist (b. 1914)
- August 17 – Motomu Kiyokawa, voice actor (b. 1935)
- August 20
  - Masahiro Kobayashi, film director (b. 1954)
  - Tokihisa Morikawa, film director (b. 1929)
- August 23 – Ikko Furuya, actor (b. 1944)
- August 24 – Kazuo Inamori, businessman (b. 1932)
- August 27 – 2nd Kinō Sanyūtei (4th Sanyūtei Kinba, Tatsunori Matsumoto), rakugo storyteller, (b. 1929)

=== September ===
- September 25 – Masaaki Ikenaga, former professional baseball pitcher (b. 1946)
- September 27 – Shinjirō Ehara, actor (b. 1936)
- September 28 – Masayoshi Takemura, politician (former governor of Shiga and Chief Cabinet Secretary) (b. 1934)
- September 30 – San'yūtei Enraku VI, Rakugo comedian (b. 1950)

=== October ===
- October 1 – Antonio Inoki, professional wrestler (b. 1943)
- October 4 – Shigeki Tanaka, marathon and long-distance runner (b. 1931)
- October 5 – Shinsuke Chikaishi, voice actor (b. 1931)
- October 12 – Katsuya Kitamura, professional wrestler and bodybuilder (b. 1985)
- October 19 – Kōji Nakamoto, comedian (b. 1941)
- October 21 – Masato Kudo, football player (b. 1990)

=== November ===
- November 1 – Tsuneo Fukuhara, composer (b. 1932)
- November 11 – Choji Murata, baseball player (b. 1949)
- November 14 – Kiyoyuki Yanada, voice actor (b. 1965)
- November 15 – Shigeru Nakamura, supercentenarian in Japan (as November 2022) (b. 1911)
- November 27 – Yoichi Sai, film director (b. 1949)
- November 28 – Toru Watanabe, actor and husband of Ikue Sakakibara (b. 1951)

=== December ===
- December 6 – Ichirou Mizuki, singer (b. 1948)
- December 8 – Yoshishige Yoshida, film director (b. 1933)
- December 14 – Kōji Tsukasa, musician (b. 1962)
- December 17 – Yūji Tanaka, drummer, musician (b. 1957)
- December 20 – Chika Takami, actress (b. 1962)
- December 28 – Arata Isozaki, architecter (b. 1931)

== See also ==
=== Country overviews ===
- Japan
- History of Japan
- Outline of Japan
- Government of Japan
- Politics of Japan
- Years in Japan
- Timeline of Japanese history

=== Related timelines for current period ===
- 2022
- 2020s
- 2020s in political history
