= Kazuo Takahashi (disambiguation) =

Kazuo Takahashi (born 1969) is a Japanese retired mixed martial artist.

Kazuo Takahashi may also refer to:

- Kazuo Takahashi (politician) (1930–2022)
- Kazuki Takahashi (1961–2022), a Japanese manga artist and game creator
