= Osaka massacre =

Osaka massacre may refer to:

- Ikeda school massacre (2001)
- Osaka movie theatre fire (2008)
- 2021 Osaka building fire
