= Shigeru Yagi =

Japanese murderer and possible serial killer

- Born: 1950 (age 75–76); Japan
- Convictions: Murder x2 Attempted murder x1
- Penalty: Death

Details
- Victims: 2–3
- Span of crimes: 1989–1999
- Country: Japan
- State: Saitama
- Date apprehended: March 2000
- Imprisoned at: Tokyo Detention House, Tokyo

Shigeru Yagi (Japanese: 八木茂; born 1950) is a Japanese murderer, former hostess club owner and possible serial killer who is the main culprit in the Honjō Insurance Murder Case (Japanese: 本庄保険金殺人事件).

Together with three female employees, he fatally poisoned two men and attempted to kill a third at his establishment in Honjō between 1995 and 1999, all as part of an insurance fraud scheme. There is also speculation that he could possibly have been involved in an earlier poisoning, but he was never charged in that case.

== Early life ==
Little is known about Yagi's personal life. Born in 1950, he began running his hostess club sometime in the early 1980s, which proved to be a very successful venture for him. At this establishment, he employed many young women, including his childhood friend Mayumi Take, who accepted his job offer after failing her high school entrance exam.

Yagi was known to be very promiscuous and frequently fraternized with his female employees, often having multiple girlfriends at once. Despite this, when his first mistress, Takako Morita, became pregnant, he accepted her offer to quit her job and officially marry him, with the couple having three children in total.

== Murders ==
=== Modus operandi ===
Out of apparent greed, Yagi eventually devised a scheme to swindle older male customers out of their insurance money by arranging sham marriages with his employees, after which he would instruct the women to kill the unsuspecting victims in order to collect said insurance. In order to do this, he was aided by three accomplices: then-32-year-old Take, his 38-year-old wife Morita and 34-year-old Filipina Analie Sato Kawamura.

=== Crimes ===
In June 1995, 45-year-old Shuichi Sato, a steel factory worker, resorted to drinking large quantities of alcohol to help with his sleep deprivation and to avoid overwork death. Unbeknownst to Sato, his favorite food (consisting of manjū and dorayaki) was laced with small doses of monkshood over an extended period of time by Kawamura. However, when he showed no signs of weakening, Sato was fed an anpan containing a lethal dose of monkshood that killed him overnight. In order to get rid of the body, Yagi instructed Kawamura to dispose of it in the Tone River to appear as if the man had drowned. Subsequently, Kawamura was awarded 300 million yen in insurance.

With the insurance money, Yagi established a financial company and employed Take as his main clerk. However, whilst the company was initially successful, it experienced a rapid decline due to the economic hardship caused by the bubble economy. Because of this, Yagi started searching for new victims. On May 29, 1999, 61-year-old Akira Morita, a former employee at a pachinko parlor, was poisoned by Morita after she gave him cold medicine and alcohol laced with monkshood. His official cause of death was ruled to be purulent pleurisy and pneumonia, and weighed 40 kilograms at the time of his death. A life insurance policy totaling 170 million yen was later paid to Morita following his death.

A day later, 47-year-old Fujimi Kawamura, a former painter who had developed a drug addiction, suddenly fell ill. He was hospitalized after complaining of his poor health and survived, but feeling that he had been intentionally poisoned, the man rushed to the nearest nurse to voice his suspicions. The nurse then informed the authorities, who stopped the cremation of Morita's body to perform an autopsy - it was then revealed that his body contained traces of cold medicine and alcohol in his internal organs and hair, and launched an investigation to determine whether this was a murder.

== Media sensation, investigation and trial ==
The case quickly garnered the attention of the public and media alike, as the mass poisonings carried out by Masumi Hayashi had occurred just the previous year. This was bolstered by the fact that in the eight months between the story emerging and until his arrest, Yagi held 203 paid press conferences at his club, charging an entrance fee of 3,000-6,000 yen per reporter, gaining an approximate sum of 10 million yen in the process. This was considered unprecedented, and as the case grew in notoriety, the press conferences became an almost daily feature on both national television and the press. In said conferences, Yagi insisted that he was innocent, but also did a variety of other things such as chat with reporters, sing karaoke, mess around on a kickboard or show off his marksmanship skills. On one occasion, an agitated Yagi punched a reporter from The Mainichi Shimbun.

The investigation was initially difficult, as the only available evidence was highly circumstantial. This changed when investigators did extensive interrogations with the three hostesses, who eventually revealed that they were marrying men in sham marriages. As a result, both them and Yagi were arrested in March 2000 on charges of fraud, but a short time later, all three were indicted on murder and attempted murder charges as well, after an extensive toxicology report concluded that Sato and Morita had been poisoned.

In the midst of the investigation, it was also suggested that Yagi might be responsible for the death of an unnamed woman in 1989. In that case, the woman died of acute liver failure after taking some cold medicine and alcohol that had been laced with 4.8 grams of monkshood. However, he was never charged in that case.

On October 2, 2002, Yagi was found guilty on all counts and sentenced to death. For their roles in the crimes, Take was sentenced to life imprisonment, Morita was given 12 years and Kawamura was given 15 years. In addition, they were ordered to pay back all the fraudulent insurance money they had acquired, totaling over 100 million yen.

== Aftermath ==
As of July 2024, Yagi remains on death row at the Tokyo Detention House and is currently appealing his sentence. He has steadfastly maintained his innocence. His lawyers claim that he was wrongfully convicted, alleging that the three women's confessions were coerced by police and that Sato's cause of death was indeed drowning. All of Yagi's subsequent appeals were denied, and his death sentence was finalized on July 17, 2008.

In the aftermath of the crimes, Yagi's bar was closed down and was later bought by a real estate company that is now using it as a warehouse. His family never spoke out publicly about the case and kept to themselves, with his wife passing away in the early 2010s.

== See also ==
- Capital punishment in Japan
- List of death row inmates in Japan

== Books ==
- Shukan Shincho, Vol. 45, No. 42, Shinchosha, November 2, 2000, pp. 57–58, NAID 4000169442 (in Japanese)
- Takewaki, Tamotsu (2001). 虫けら以下 - 本庄保険金殺人事件の軌跡 [Under the Mushikei - The Trajectory of the Honjō Insurance Murder Case] (in Japanese). Ota Shuppan. ISBN 9784872335873.
- Take, Mayumi (2002). 完全自白 愛の地獄 [Complete Confession: The Hell of Love] (in Japanese). Kodansha. ISBN 4062114100.
- Takashi, Takano (2004). 偽りの記憶 : 「本庄保険金殺人事件 [False Memory: The True Story of the Honjō Insurance Murder Case] (in Japanese). Gendai Jinbunsha. ISBN 487798187X.
- Osawa, Ryoshu (2019). トリカブト 「本庄保険金殺人事件」元捜査一課刑事の回想 [Honjō Insurance Murder Case: Recollections of a Former Investigation Division Detective] (in Japanese). Takarajimasya.
