= Hiroshi Yamada =

Japanese politician

- 山田 宏
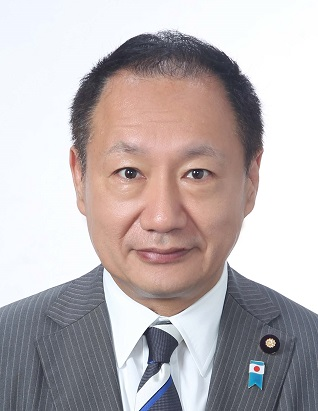
- Official portrait, 2017

Member of the House of Councillors
- Incumbent
- Assumed office 26 July 2016
- Preceded by: Multi-member district
- Constituency: National PR

Member of the House of Representatives
- In office 21 December 2012 – 21 November 2014
- Constituency: Tokyo PR
- In office 19 July 1993 – 27 September 1996
- Preceded by: Tamako Toguchi
- Succeeded by: Constituency abolished
- Constituency: Tokyo 4th

Mayor of Suginami
- In office 27 April 1999 – 31 May 2010
- Preceded by: Yasumasa Motohashi
- Succeeded by: Ryō Tanaka

Member of the Tokyo Metropolitan Assembly
- In office 23 July 1985 – 2 July 1993
- Constituency: Suginami Ward

Personal details
- Born: 8 January 1958 (age 68) Hachiōji, Tokyo, Japan
- Party: Liberal Democratic (1986–1992; 2018–present)
- Other political affiliations: NLC (1976–1986); JNP (1992–1994); NFP (1994–1998); Independent (1998–2010); SoJ (2010–2012); JRP (2012–2014); PJK (2014–2018)
- Education: Kyoto University

Hiroshi Yamada (山田 宏, Yamada Hiroshi) is a Japanese politician of the Liberal Democratic Party who is serving as a member of the House of Councillors. He is a former member of the House of Representatives and was the inaugural Secretary-General of the Party for Future Generations, an opposition party formed in August 2014.

== Early life ==
Yamada is a graduate of Kyoto University (with a major in law).

== Political career ==
In April 2010 Yamada became chairman of the Spirit of Japan Party, which he founded for the Upper House election, with Hiroshi Nakada, the former mayor of Yokohama, and Hiroshi Saitō, the former governor of Yamagata.

The party won a few seats at the prefectural and municipal level in the regional elections in 2011, and broke up in the fall of 2012 to join the Japan Restoration Party of the former governor of Tokyo Shintaro Ishihara, and later joined his Party for Future Generations.

Yamada lost his seat in the Diet in the December 2014 general election. In September 2015 it was announced that he would contest the 2016 House of Councillors election as a member of the Liberal Democratic Party.

Like Ishihara, Yamada is affiliated to the openly revisionist lobby Nippon Kaigi. He often gives lectures to local branches of the organization.
