= Osaka fire =

Osaka fire may refer to:

- Osaka movie theatre fire, 2008
- 2021 Osaka building fire, in a psychiatric clinic
