= 2005 Miyagi gubernatorial election =

Miyagi prefecture held a gubernatorial election on October 23, 2005. The LDP-backed candidate, Yoshihiro Murai, won.

Gubernatorial election 2006: Miyagi
Party	Candidate	Votes	%	±%
LDP	Yoshihiro Murai	363,519		
DPJ/SDP	Yasuyuki Maeba	311,406		
JCP	Hidetaka Deura	71,270		
Turnout			40.35	4.77
