= Ayumi Kuboki =

Japanese spree killer and suspected serial killer

- Born: 1987 (age 38–39); Tochigi, Japan
- Conviction: Murder x3
- Penalty: Life imprisonment

Details
- Victims: 3+
- Span of crimes: September 15 – 19, 2016 (confirmed)
- Country: Japan
- State: Kanagawa
- Date apprehended: June 2018

Ayumi Kuboki (久保木愛弓; born January 7, 1987) is a Japanese spree killer, suspected serial killer and former nurse who was convicted of killing three patients at the Oguchi Hospital in Yokohama using diamitol, all of which occurred September 2016. She is currently serving a life term, and remains under investigation for up to 48 total deaths that occurred at the hospital dating to July of that year.

The Kanagawa Prefectural Police have designated this as the Oguchi Hospital Inpatient Murder Case, while the Kanagawa Shimbun named it the Oguchi Hospital Continuous Drip Murder Case.

== Background ==
=== Investigation ===
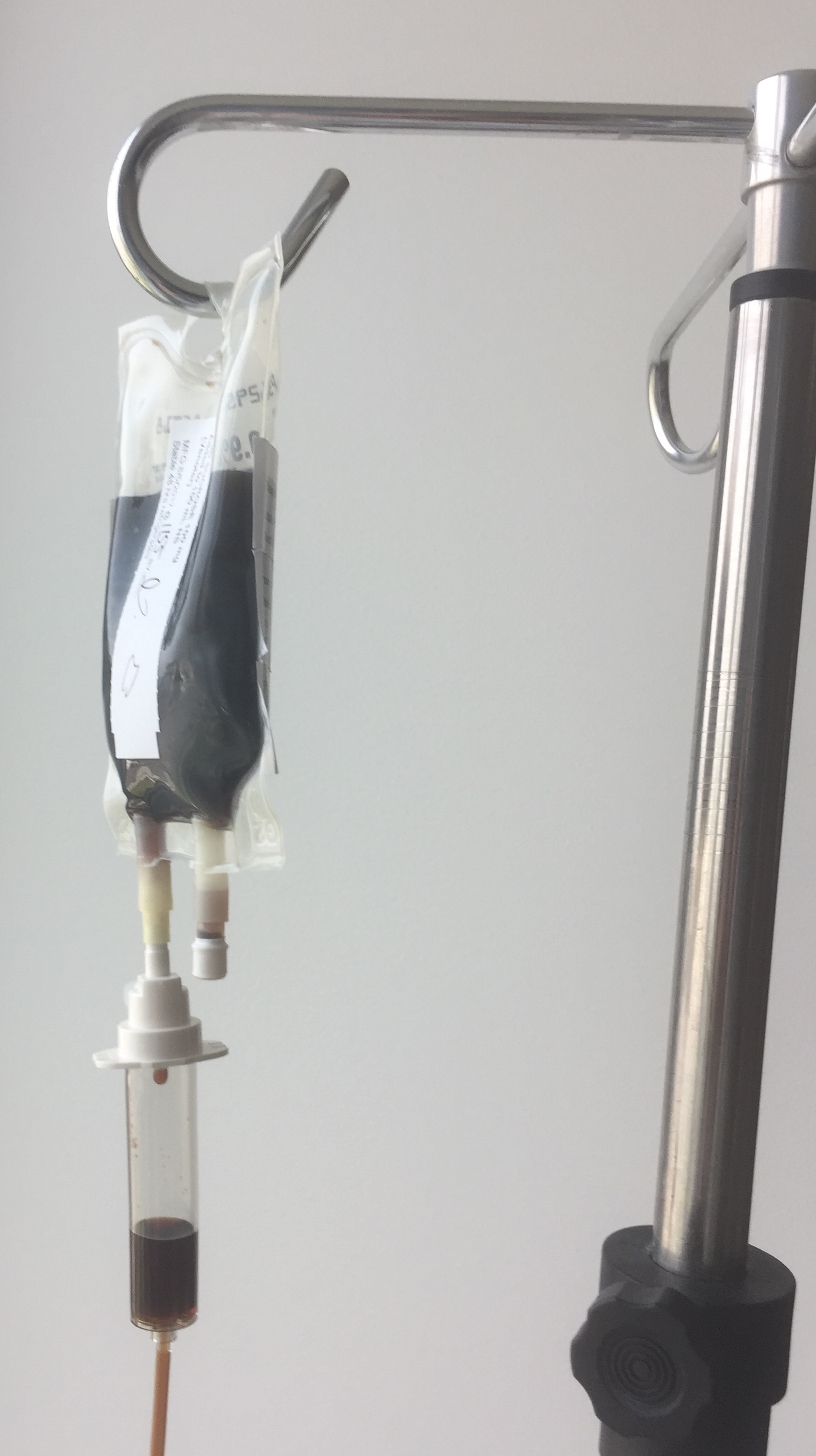
Typical bag of intravenous medication showing two ports. Nurses attach IV tubing to the left port so the fluid can flow into a person's vein. A nurse or pharmacist can use the right port to mix medication into a bag.

In September 2016, a nurse tending to a patient at the Oguchi Hospital accidentally dropped an infusion bag, causing the solution inside to begin foaming. As it was not supposed to do that, it was examined further, with the doctors discovering that it had been mixed with diamitol. Fearing a possible contamination, all IV bags on the building's premises were checked, leading to the discovery that one of the bags administered to 88-year-old Nobuo Yamaki, a patient who had died two days prior had been tampered with. Upon inspection, nurses found a hole pierced with a fine needle in the protective filter that seals the rubber stopper, which was the case with about ten other such bags. As it was feared that this might have affected other recent deaths at the hospital, which amounted to an unusually high amount of 48 since July, staff contacted Kanagawa Prefectural Police for assistance. An investigation concluded that somebody had intentionally inserted foreign substances into the bodies of the patients and deliberately killed them by mixing it in with the IV bags, and so, a special inquiry was started in order to resolve the case.

The diamitol used for the crime was used for business purposes and was placed at various places in the hospital, making it extremely difficult to identify the culprit. To resolve this, the police carried out an appraisal of what the hospital's inventory, and an examination of the employees' clothes at the time revealed traces of diamitol in the pockets of Ayumi Kuboki. In addition, during the night shift immediately after the incident was discovered, a security camera installed by the prefectural police showed her walking around the hospital with a drug that she was not assigned to administer. She was zeroed in as the prime suspect after a colleague claimed that he had seen her enter the room of a patient to whom she was not assigned—soon after she left, his condition worsened and he died.

=== Arrest ===
At the end of June 2018, the prefectural police began to interview Kuboki based on the circumstantial evidence they had gathered up until then. During the interview, she readily admitted to infusing the bags of at least 20 patients with diamitol. As a result, she was arrested and charged with murder on July 7. On July 28, she was charged with an additional murder concerning the death of another patient in September 2016, who died after the antiseptic solution was mixed in with his drip. After her arrest, however, Kuboki, who was interviewed by several TV stations and newspapers, sent handwritten letters in which she denied responsibility.

She later retracted those statements, admitting that her motive for killing the patients was her fear of explaining the deaths to their family members. Kuboki also claimed that on one occasion, after a colleague blamed her for the death of a patient, she constantly thought about killing him outside of working hours.

Before the murders occurred, there were reports of vandalism at the ward, with items being stabbed with needles or going missing, and robes being torn. Kuboki herself claimed that fellow nurses frequently gossiped and complained about various problems relating to their patients or relatives, which sometimes even led to arguments. Due to multiple accusations relating to verbal abuse and neglect of patients, multiple nurses working at the hospital resigned from their posts. These allegations were corroborated by the family members of some victims, who claimed that they had witnesses them arguing between one another, and that one nurse had yelled at their relative while they were visiting him.

In interviews, she claimed, according to psychiatrist Tamami Katada, Kuboki's true motive might have been a way to exact revenge on her colleagues and bosses: by killing patients during the working hours of other nurses, she would cause problems and eventually a scandal that would lead to their ruin.

== Trial ==
On December 7, 2018, Kuboki was charged with 5 counts of premeditated murder relating to the deaths of three patients who died between September 15 and 19, 2016. A sixth charge relating to the death of a fourth patient was dismissed on the grounds that his death might have been caused by accident, as his infusion bag had been accidentally contaminated with diamitol while she was trying to kill another patient. The charges were filed before the Yokohama District Court, with the presiding justice being Karei Kazunori.

=== First instance ===
The trial began on October 1, 2021. The prosecutorial side argued for the death penalty, claiming that the defendant was fully aware of her actions, while her attorneys claimed that she was in a state of diminished responsibility due to her schizophrenia.

The final judgment was delivered on November 9, with the Yokohama District Court recognizing that Kuboki was autistic, which was recognized as a mitigating factor. However, they rebuked the claims that her schizophrenia affected her judgment, finding that she was legally sane at the time when she committed the murders. As a result, she was found guilty and sentenced to life imprisonment. The verdict proved unsatisfying for both the prosecutors and the attorneys, both of whom are currently appealing the sentence to the Tokyo High Court.

== Response from Oguchi Hospital ==
Prior to the incident, the Yokohama City Council received multiple complaints about issues relating to the hospital, due to which they installed a third-party committee to evaluate conditions at the establishment. In the report, titled "Verification Report on Medical Safety Operations in Yokohama City (Regarding Responses to Large Hospitals)", the committee concluded that they had no authority to either inspect or guide the hospital's actions due to statutes of the Medical Care Act, which created a "system gap" between the council and the hospital administration. As a result, they suggested that a request be made to the national government for improvement in regards to this issue.

On the hospital's side, in spite of the allegations of misconduct dating back to June, the director said that he initially thought it should be dealt with at the hospital, but as things got out of hand, he had to resort to contacting the prefectural police. Since the incident, the Oguchi Hospital was renamed to the Yokohama Hajime Hospital.

== See also ==
- Hayato Imai, another nurse who killed patients in the same region, on death row
