= Spirit of Japan Party =

The Spirit of Japan Party
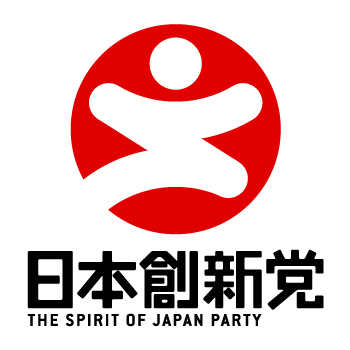
- President: Hiroshi Yamada
- Secretary general: Hiroshi Nakada
- Founded: 18 April 2010
- Dissolved: 29 September 2012
- Merger of: Japan Restoration Party
- Ideology: Conservatism; Libertarian conservatism Anti-establishment
- Councillors: Hiroshi Saito

Website
- www.nippon-soushin.jp

The Spirit of Japan Party (日本創新党, Nippon Sōshin Tō) was a Japanese political party formed by then-present and former regional government leaders. It was officially headed by Hiroshi Yamada; Hiroshi Nakada was the secretary-general and former governor of Yamagata. Hiroshi Saito led the party's policy committee.
