= Yoshihiro Yasuda =

Japanese lawyer

- Born: Yoshihiro Yasuda; December 4, 1947 (age 78); Hyogo Prefecture, Japan
- Education: Hitotsubashi University
- Occupation: Lawyer

Yoshihiro Yasuda (安田 好弘, Yasuda Yoshihiro; born December 4, 1947) is a Japanese lawyer known for his anti–death penalty activism. With death penalty being a prominent method of punishment for violent criminals in Japan, Yasuda has defended many of these cases. At the time when Yasuda took on many of these cases, such cases were considered detrimental to a lawyer's career. He participated in many controversial trials because he believed that the suspects were tried unfairly as a result of mass media bashing.

== Background ==
Yoshihiro Yasuda was born in Hyogo Prefecture on December 4, 1947. He graduated Hitotsubashi University Faculty of Law in 1975. In 1977, Yasuda passed the bar exam, and in 1980, he officially became a lawyer after completing the Supreme Court Legal Research and Training Institute.

== Criminal cases ==
=== Shinjuku bus attack ===
Yasuda was one of the defenders for a Shinjuku bus attacker who killed six people in 1980. The attacker was not sentenced to death, but he died by suicide in 1997.

=== Japan Air Lines Flight 404 ===
Japan Air Lines Flight 404 was an airliner hijacked by Palestinian and Japanese terrorists on July 20, 1973. As of 1987, Yasuda was elected to the counsel of the accused (Osamu Maruoka). Osamu Maruoka was sentenced to life imprisonment.

=== Aum Shinrikyo ===
Shoko Asahara, the founder of the religious cult group Aum Shinrikyo, was trialed as the mastermind behind the crimes perpetrated by his followers, including the Tokyo subway sarin gas attack. Yasuda was the court-appointed attorney to defend Asahara in 1995, but was forced to resign from the team due to his arrest in 1998. Some critics asserted that the arrest was made because prosecutors were dissatisfied with Yasuda's court tactics to delay the trial as long as possible to avoid the likely death sentence on Asahara.

1,200 lawyers listed as Yasuda's defenders, and Japan Federation of Bar Associations and Amnesty International protested that the arrest was unfair. After his legal complications were settled in 2003, Yasuda became Asahara's private lawyer.

In September 15, 2006, the Supreme Court upheld the death sentence on Asahara.

=== Masumi Hayashi ===
Yasuda defended Masumi Hayashi, who was convicted of putting poison in a pot of curry being served at a 1998 summer festival in the Sonobe district of Wakayama, Wakayama, Japan. Yasuda was asked by Kazuyoshi Miura, who was exchanging letters with Masumi Hayashi, to work on this trial. Despite Yasuda's efforts, she was sentenced to death in 2002.

=== Hikari City homicides ===
Yasuda was the chief defender for a man who raped and strangled a 23-year-old woman to death and murdered her 11-month-old daughter in 1999 in Hikari city, Yamaguchi. This case has received much attention because of the circumstances of the crime and the possibility of the death penalty being used: the age of majority in Japan is 18, but in 1999 it was still set to 20, however perpetrators that were under 20 but over 18 when they committed the crime, as in the Hikari city case, could receive the full sentence. In 2006 the Supreme Court ruled that the perpetrator's age at the time of the crime did not exempt him from the death penalty. Yasuda and the defense team tried to prevent the death penalty from being applied by claiming that the perpetrator did not intend to kill the woman or her baby. In March 2006, Yasuda and his group of attorneys were absent from the oral argument hearing for an unknown reason. The Japanese media considered their behavior a tactic to delay the trial just as they did during the Asahara trial; the Supreme Court ordered them to attend the next hearing. The perpetrator was sentenced to death by the Hiroshima High Court in April 2008.

== Arrest ==
On December 6, 1998, Yasuda was arrested on charges of obstruction of justice (the compulsory seizure of rental income of one of the failed jusen mortgage lenders). Yasuda was charged with advising the Singaporean real estate developer Sun Chungli and his son Naoaki to set up a dummy company to hide assets. Sun was the president of Sun's Corporation Tokyo Ltd., a major borrower from the several former, now obsolete jusen housing loan companies. Yasuda was accused by the police of conspiring with Sun to hide rental income of approximately 200 million yen by using a dummy company by the name of Wide Treasure. The police suspected that Yasuda instructed the Sun family on how to hide assets. Yasuda acknowledged that he became the legal advisor for Sun in 1991, but argued that he gave advice within a legal framework. Yasuda denied the charges, and claimed he had no involvement in the Wide Treasure operation while the Sun family pleaded guilty. Yasuda was acquitted in 2003.

== Yasuda on mass media ==
Yasuda's reason for defending the accused who are labelled by society as highly vicious criminals is that he believes their chance of a fair trial is taken away by media bashings. Yasuda fears the recent trend by the media to label people as vicious villains to bury the possibility of a legitimate trial for the accused as a signal of a crisis of democracy in Japan. Yasuda criticizes the premise of modern Japanese law that deviates from justice as the need for assumed innocence has increasingly become a prerequisite for acquittal; he sees this as a crisis in the judicial system.

== Movies ==
Shikei Bengonin (死刑弁護人), a documentary directed by Junichi Saito that explores the issue of capital punishment with a focus on Yasuda, was released in theaters on June 30, 2012. The movie is based on a TV show that aired midnights in 2011. The film was also screened at the Amnesty International Human Rights Documentary Film Show in Hong Kong.

Cast and crew:

- Narration: Taro Yamamoto
- Director: Junichi Saito
- Producer: Katsuhiko Abuno
- Music: Shouhei Murai
- Music producer: Kozue Okada
- Filming: Akihiko Iwai
- Editor: Tetsuji Yamamoto

== Books ==
- Shikei Bengonin: Ikiru to Iu Kenri
