= Jun Maki =

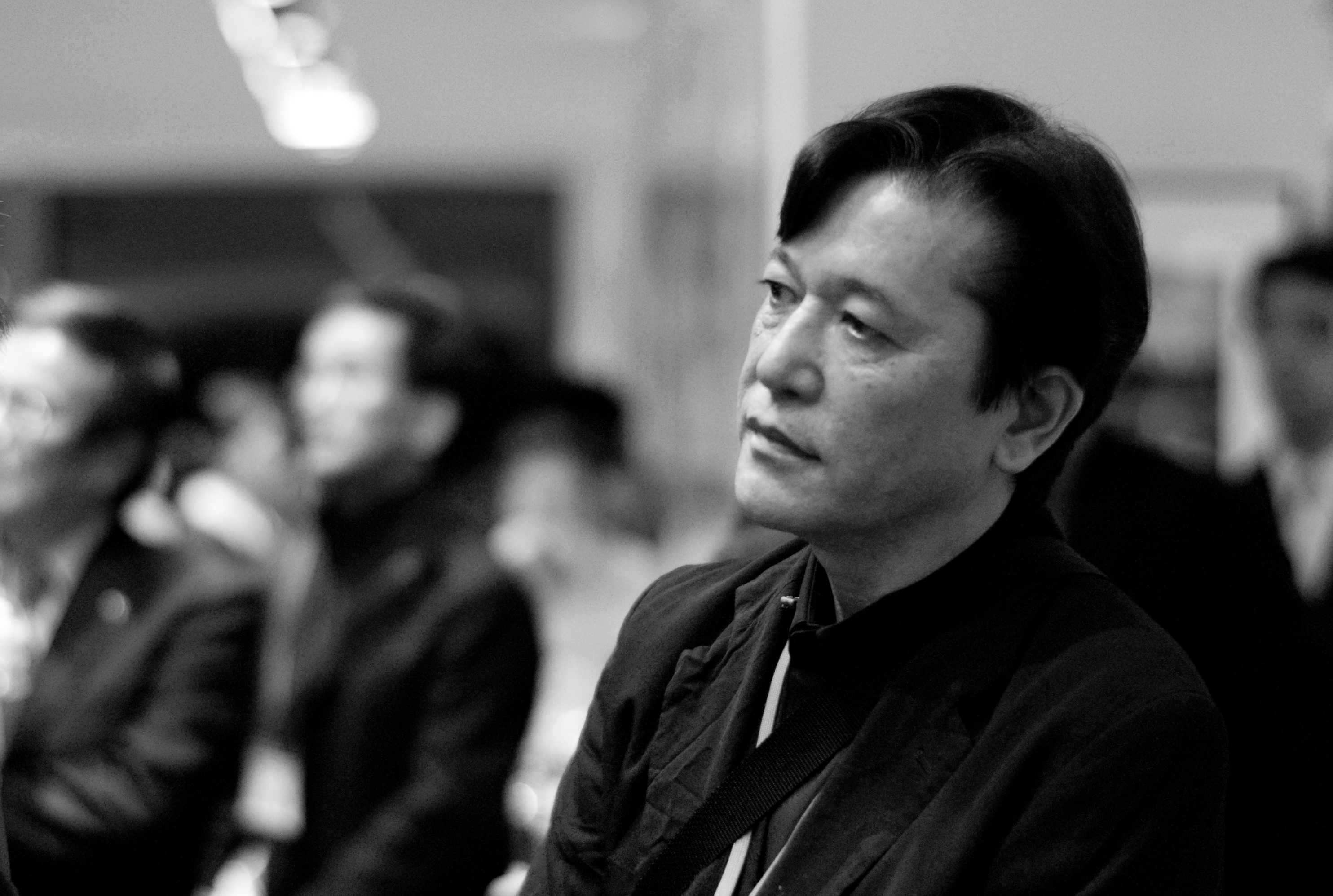
Jun Maki

Jun Maki (眞木 準, Maki Jun, October 20, 1948, in Aichi Prefecture – June 22, 2009) was a Japanese copywriter. A 1971 graduate of Keio University, he formerly worked for Hakuhodo, Japan's second largest advertising agency. He died on June 22, 2009, of a myocardial infarction. He was 60 years old.
