= Kazu I =

Sightseeing boat of Japan

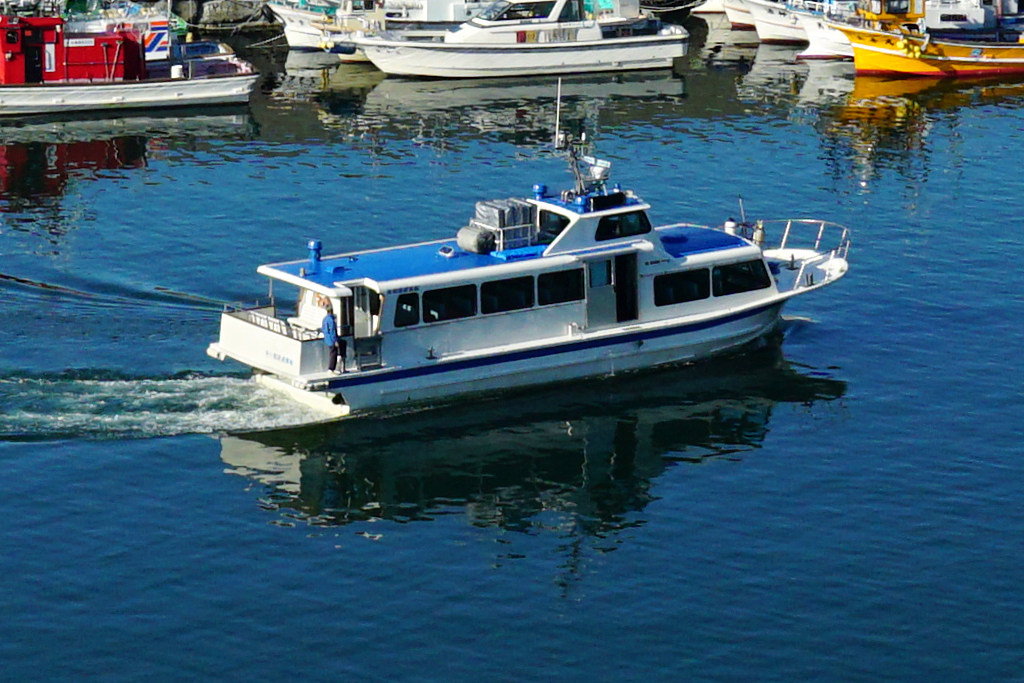
- Kazu I at Utoro Port Shari, Hokkaido, 2014

History
- Name: Kazu I
- Operator: Shiretoko Pleasure Cruise
- Port of registry: Hokkaido, Japan
- Route: Shiretoko Peninsula
- Launched: 1985
- In service: 1985
- Fate: Sank on 23 April 2022 with twenty six people on board

General characteristics
- Type: Tourist boat
- Tonnage: 19 GRT
- Crew: 2

The Kazu I (Hepburn: kazu wan) was a 19-ton tourist boat operating off the Hokkaido island of Japan, travelling around the Shiretoko Peninsula. The boat was operated by the Shiretoko Pleasure Cruise (知床遊覧船, Shiretoko Yūransen). The Shiretoko Peninsula, designated a natural World Heritage Site in 2005, is a popular destination for observing drift ice and rare animals.

The boat sank on 23 April 2022 with 26 people on board. Fourteen bodies have been recovered with twelve missing. As of April 20, 2023, 20 bodies had been recovered, 6 are still missing; no bodies have been found since August, 2022. No survivors were found.

== Background ==
Kazu I was initially built as Hikari 8 in February 1985 at a shipyard in Yamaguchi for use of a ferry service between Mihara and Ikuchi-jima by the Hourai Kisen. Those who knew the ship back then, upon hearing the demise of Kazu I, remarked that the ship was built specifically for the calm seas of the Inland Sea in mind and was not for the rough open seas, such as those at the Okhotsk Sea. Hikari 8 was sold after a few years, and again in the 1990s to a ferry operator in Okayama Prefecture to serve the route between Hinase and Ushimado, only for the company to go bankrupt a few years later as well. The ship's ownership was transferred to an individual in Osaka before ultimately being sold to Shiretoko Pleasure Cruise in the fall of 2005.

Kazu I's twin engine was reduced to just a single engine soon after the ship was transferred to Shiretoko, with the removed engine reused for a different cruiser Shiretoko Pleasure Cruise operated. In 2015, a bulbous bow was added to the ship, and the ship's length was increased from 11.86 meters to 12.14 meters, as well as the draft being increased from 1.52 to 1.62 meters. In 2021 the remaining engine was replaced as the engine was old.

== Incidents ==
In June 2021 she ran aground in shallow water shortly after leaving port; no one was injured.

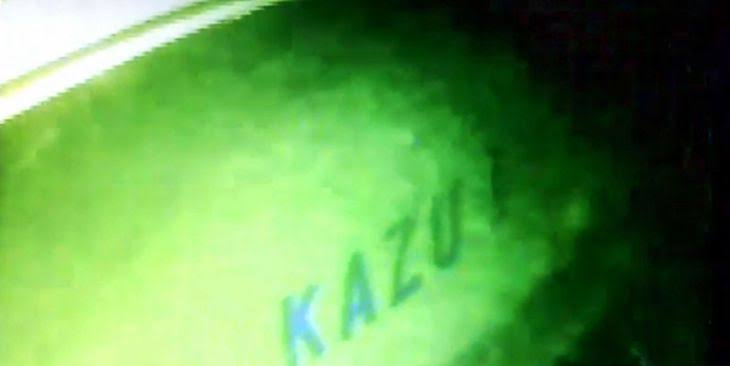
The wreck seen by PAP-104 ROV.

=== Sinking ===
At 13:15 local time on 23 April 2022 the ship went missing with 26 people on board, of which two were crew and two were children. The ship was crewed by a 54 year old captain and a 27 year old deckhand. The crew signaled that the boat was listing at 30 degrees and was about to sink. The crew said all aboard were wearing life jackets, however the water temperature reached 0 degrees Celsius at night. Due to high waves in the area, local fishing boats had decided to return to port. The Japan Coast Guard dispatched five patrol boats and two aircraft to search for survivors.

As of 30 April 2022 fourteen people were confirmed dead, the rest missing. On 29 April the wreckage of the boat was found, located on a slope near the Shiretoko Peninsula at a depth of 115–120 meters. On 8 May, a submersible was used to probe the sunken boat in an attempt to locate the bodies of the twelve remaining missing people.

In late June Russia found two bodies on Kunashir Island, and then another additional body on the south coast of Sakhalin, of likely victims from Kazu I.

== Timeline ==
10:00 The Kazu I departs with 26 people on board. 24 are tourists including 2 children and 2 are crew members. The tour was expected to take 3 hours.

10:10 A trekking tour spots and photographs the Kazu I approximately 3 km out at sea. According to the trekking guide the ship was operating normally.。

12:10 Shiretoko Pleasure Cruise suspends a tour planned at 14:00 due to high wave conditions.

12:55 A male employee at Shiretoko Pleasure Cruise, sensing uncertainty due to the worsening weather conditions calls the captain of Kazu I on his cellphone with no response. The main office's radio antenna had been damaged and inoperable since January.

=== Sinking ===
13:00 Using a radio on an amateur frequency contact is established with the Kazu I captain. He reports that the ship is near Kasyuni Waterfalls and that returning will take a while. Compared to normal conditions the boat is 1 hour behind schedule. Conditions suddenly change and the office employee hears "make them wear lifevests" "the engine has stopped and we're sinking from the bow" "we might lose power" on the radio.

13:13 The main office calls the Japan Coast Guard's 118 emergency number: "He told me on an amateur radio frequency that the ship is about to sink. Shiretoko Pleasure Cruise's Kazu I. There's tourists on board. Around Kasyuni Waterfalls." Office employees instruct the captain to also contact the Japan Coast Guard. "I think that's it. We're going to lose power" is the last radio transmission sent by the Kazu I.。

13:18 Using a cellphone borrowed by one of the tourists the captain calls the Japan Coast Guard. Their reported position is approximately 1 km from Kasyuni Waterfalls, 200m from where the wreck is eventually discovered. Several tourists make phone calls after the sinking, one 70-year from Saga Prefecture telling his wife, "The ship is sinking, thank you for everything."

13:21 Another tourist calls his family and tells them "The ship is flooded and we're sinking. I'm up to my legs in water. It's too cold to swim. I can't make the jump." According to the inquiry this is the last communication from the Kazu I.

=== Rescue efforts ===
13:22 1st Regional Coast Guard Headquarters mobilizes helicopters and patrol vessels

13:30 A Shiretoko Pleasure Cruise boat departs to look for survivors but turns back due to rough weather conditions. The CEO contacts local fisherman for help but gets rebuffed due to weather conditions.

13:47 The Shiretoko Pleasure Cruise office contacts the Japan Coast Guard: "What happened to the Kazu I? The fishermen are saying they can't depart due to the weather. Without a helicopter they'll run out of time. They'll sink. Everyone is wearing lifejackets. We're requesting ships and helicopters."

14:55 Local Coast Guard representatives arrive at Shiretoko Pleasure Cruise's office. Attempts are made to call 12 phone numbers written by the tourists on board but no contact is established.

16:30 Japan Coast Guard helicopter arrives on scene, begins looking for survivors.

17:55 Japan Coast Guard Patrol Vessel arrives on scene, begins looking for survivors.

19:40 1st Regional Coast Guard Headquarters contacts Chitose Air base, requests assistance from the Japan Air Self-Defense Force.

20:29 2 U-125A aircraft arrive from Chitose Airbase, begins looking for survivors.

23:44 2 P-3C aircraft from the Japan Maritime Defense Force arrive on scene, begins looking for survivors.

== Investigation ==
The Kazu I had been advised by another tourism operator not to leave port due to the hazardous sea conditions. It was the first tourist boat to be operated in the Shiretoko area, 3 other local tourism ship operators delaying the start of their seasons due to weather. Forecasts at the time of the accident showed high winds and waves reaching as high as 3 meters. Kazu I was licensed to put to sea when wind speed is no greater than 8 m/sec, but the weather forecast predicted winds of 15 m/sec. The ship also operated alone, breaking a safety agreement with other operators that at least two ships should be together at sea. In a press conference on 28 April Shiretoko Pleasure Cruise CEO Seiichi Katsurada bowed on the floor and apologized, stating "We caused a disastrous accident, and I’m very sorry." He admitted that the main antenna and satellite phone on deck were known to be inoperable prior to the disaster. Katsurada stated he had approved the trip as he considered that the captain could utilize a cellphone and other boat operators could assist as well. His actions attracted condemnation from both former Shiretoko Pleasure Cruise employees and the Ministry of Land, Infrastructure, Transport and Tourism, Tetsuo Saito calling his conduct "unthinkable."

On 2 May 2022, the Japanese coast guard raided the offices of the tour boat operator as part of a criminal investigation into the sinking. On 11 May 2022 the Hokkaido Joint Communications Bureau announced it was investigating the operators of the Kazu I over their use of amateur HAM transmissions for communicating with ships at sea. Enterprise use of amateur radio frequencies is illegal in Japan. The practice reportedly started as a cost-cutting measure as expensive satellite calls were billed to individual crew members. A subsequent report by the Japan Transport Safety Board found that Katsurada also dismissed experienced crew members and appointed himself as safety manager and operations manager of Shiretoko Pleasure Cruises despite being unqualified as part of cost-cutting measures to mitigate the impact of the COVID-19 pandemic. He was arrested on 18 September 2024.

== Aftermath ==
The Shireteko area was known for having intermittent cellphone coverage and prior to the disaster Shari and Rausu township had solicited infrastructure expansion to the government. Following the disaster the government announced plans to establish a local base station, expecting greater cell phone usage by small fishing vessels.
