= Yamaguchi arson and murders =

2013 crimes in Japan

Coordinates: 34°11′15″N 131°52′04″E

The Yamaguchi arson and murders took place on July 21 and 22, 2013 in the hamlet of Mitake, in Shūnan, in Yamaguchi Prefecture, Japan, and resulted in the deaths of five people. These murders prompted a manhunt for a 63-year-old man who had disappeared from the town after the killings, leaving two cars and his dog behind. The suspect's house had a haiku poem posted in the window reading "Setting a fire—smoke gives delight—to a country fellow".

== Murders ==
On Sunday July 21, 2013, the bodies of a woman and a couple, all in their 70s, were found in their fire-gutted houses. The bodies of two other seniors were discovered in their intact homes the next morning.

Two houses in Mitake had been destroyed by fire. Authorities determined that the fires were "suspicious" and found dead bodies. On the morning of July 22, police found two additional bodies in the same area, several hundred meters away from the destroyed houses. Police found a haiku in the residence of the suspect. The suspect, a 63-year-old man, had moved to the hamlet around 1993 to watch over his parents, who died around 2006.

About one third of Mitake's population died in the incident.

== Arrest and sentencing ==
The suspect, a neighbour of the victims, was arrested in a wooded area on July 26, 2013, and taken to a nearby police station for interrogation. On December 27, 2013, the Yamaguchi District Public Prosecutors Office officially charged Kosei Homi with five counts of murder and arson.

On July 28, 2015, Homi was found guilty of all charges and was sentenced to death. He filed an appeal against the death sentence, but it was denied by the Supreme Court on July 18, 2019.
