= 2009 Japanese cash handout =

2009 economic cash handout in Japan

In March 2009, the Japanese Parliament passed legislation to distribute ¥12,000 (Note: Approximately US$120 or €95 in March 2009) to every legally-resident man, woman and child in the country, including foreigners. Children and pensioners would receive an extra ¥8,000 each. The cash handout (定額給付金 teigaku kyuufukin, lit. 'fixed-amount benefit') measure, totalling ¥2 trillion, (Note: Approximately US$200 million or €160 million in March 2009.) was intended to stimulate the recession-hit Japanese economy, which in common with others globally, was suffering as a result of the ongoing Great Recession.

== Public unease ==
The scheme was unpopular with the Japanese public, with the prevailing view that the "cash handout", as it was popularly known, would do little to stimulate the economy. This was not the first time that such schemes had been tried, and the consensus economic opinion was that a 1999 attempt had been a failure. Fears were also raised that the local government offices would be swamped by applications, just as the Japanese financial year (from 1st April) would be coming to an end.

== Implementation ==
As soon as the legislation was passed, the first recipients who had applied for the money received the cash in the form of transfers to their bank accounts. The implementation of the scheme had been left up to local government, so the money was not distributed to everyone at the same time, and involved considerable administrative work. The first recipients included residents of remote villages in Hokkaido and northern Honshu; areas with higher populations would follow later. To apply, recipients had to provide a photocopy of acceptable photo ID such as a driving licence. The problem of a village without a single photocopier was solved by local administrators journeying to the remote area with appropriate equipment; a queue formed for people to copy their documents.

== Aftermath ==
Following the implementation of the scheme, the governing Liberal Democratic Party which had proposed the handouts was defeated by the Democratic Party of Japan. The newly-elected government had no plans to repeat the measure, and had opposed the 2009 handout while in opposition.

A similar measure, the Special Fixed-Amount Payment Grant, followed during the COVID-19 pandemic in 2020.
