= Hayato Imai =

Japanese serial killer (born 1991)

- Born: 1991 (age 34–35); Kanagawa-ku, Yokohama, Japan
- Convictions: Murder x3 Theft
- Penalty: Death

Details
- Victims: 3+
- Span of crimes: November – December 2014
- Country: Japan
- State: Kanagawa
- Date apprehended: For the final time on December 31, 2014

Hayato Imai (今井 隼人, Imai Hayato; born 1991) is a Japanese serial killer who murdered three elderly people at a nursing home in Saiwai-ku, Kawasaki between November and December 2014. A former emergency medical technician, he was sentenced to death, and is currently trying to appeal said sentence.

== Case overview ==
In the months of November and December, 2014, three residents of the "S Amille Kawasaki Yukimachi" nursing home died suddenly. The deaths were ruled as suspicious, and possibly homicidal in nature. On February 16, 2016, the Kanagawa Prefectural Police arrested 23-year-old Hayato Imai, a former employee, on murder charges. In May 2015, he had been fired for stealing a patient's wallet and sentenced to two years and six months imprisonment, but had been allowed to leave prison under a 4-year-long suspended sentence.

== Timeline ==
- 2014
  - May 5: Imai began working at the nursing home.
  - November 4: an 87-year-old male patient was found dead in the backyard.
  - December 9: an 86-year-old female patient was found dead in the backyard.
  - December 31: a 96-year-old female patient was found dead in the backyard.
- 2015
  - May 21: Imai was arrested on suspicion of stealing a patient's wallet.
  - September 24: Hayato is found guilty, sentenced to two years and six months imprisonment, with a 4-year suspended sentence.
  - Late September: An investigation into the deaths is launched. Imai told the Mainichi Shimbun and other newspapers that he was not involved: "I chose the long-term care industry because I wanted to see them off, as my own family had died".
  - December 11: Three other ex-employees were arrested on charges of battery against a patient. The charges against one stuck, but the others were released for unknown reasons.
  - December 21: The Kawasaki District Court suspends nursing fees to the facility for three months.
- 2016
  - Late January: Imai is interviewed on several occasions by the Kanagawa Prefectural Police.
  - February 15: The Kanagawa Prefectural Police arrest Imai, after he made statements incriminating himself. During his interviews, Hayato shared information only the killer would know.
  - February 16: Imai is arrested on suspicion of committing for the first murder.
  - March 4: Imai is arrested on suspicion of committing the second murder. On the same day, the Yokohama District Public Prosecutor's Office announces that it will take up the case.
  - March 5: An investigation by the Kanagawa Prefectural Police reveals that a pipe was found on the second victim's private balcony, near where she had fallen to her death.
  - March 25: Imai is arrested on suspicion of killing the third victim. That same day, he is officially charged with the second murder by the Yokohama District Prosecutor's Office.
  - April 15: Imai is officially charged with the third murder, thus ending the investigation.

== Trial ==
On November 6, 2017, the Yokohama District Court, with presiding Justice Watanabe Eikei, decides that the date of the first trial would be January 23, 2018.

Immediately after his arrest, Imai confessed to the three murders, but in subsequent interviews before the trials, he changed his testimony, at first claiming to be unable to remember the events. Later on, he said that he remembered, but professed his innocence. The attorneys claimed his confession would be unreliable, and its credibility would be the biggest issue of the whole trial.

=== First trial, Yokohama District Court ===
On January 23, 2018, the trial began in the Yokohama District Court, with Justice Hidetaka Watanabe at the head of it.

In the prosecution's opening statement, it was said that, at the time of the murders, the defendant was the only one on duty, and that it was extremely unlikely that anybody else could've been the perpetrator. Regarding his confession, the prosecutors noted that it was recorded, and deemed credible, insisting that this was serial murder against weak, elderly people who trusted the staff.

On the contrary, Hayato denied the claims, saying that he had no memory of being at the facility at the designated time frame. In addition, the defense counsel argued that he should be acquitted, stating that Imai showed signs of amnesia, and thus shouldn't be considered criminally liable for the deaths.

In total, 23 witnesses would be questioned, including doctors and other officials working at the nursing home, in addition to various evidence being presented.

==== Closing arguments ====
On March 1, 2018, the closing arguments were presented, with the prosecution demanding the death penalty for Imai.

The defense counsel opposed these demands, reiterating about their client's innocence. According to them, there was no feasible evidence demonstrating that Hayato was responsible for the deaths, and it couldn't be ruled out that they were accidents or suicides. When it came to the confession, they alleged that it was coerced by law enforcement.

In his final statement, Imai said the following: "I wanted to be released from the interrogation, but I was forced to make a false confession, speaking the truth only in court. I haven't done anything."

==== Sentence ====
On March 22, 2018, Justice Watanabe Eikei found the defendant guilty of the murders, and sentenced Hayato Imai to death.

In the court ruling, it was deemed that the suspect's confession was very unlikely to have been forced, and was deemed credible.

Imai's defense team appealed the verdict, sending it to the Tokyo High Court. No decision has been returned yet.

== Motivation ==
Regarding Imai's possible motive, he himself claimed to have experienced "mixed emotions" and that he was a "troubled man" when questioned about the first murder. In addition, the Kanagawa Prefectural Police believe that another possibility could be the stressful nature of his profession, backed up by remarks made by Hayato himself.

== Hayato Imai's life ==
According to his acquaintances, Imai was a "friendly guy", but was often prone to bragging. He was a qualified paramedic, and regarded highly by everybody around him. However, at the time of the murders, numerous thefts were reported at the facility, leading to suspicions that it might've been his doing. In addition, he is known as a compulsive liar. Some have speculated that he could be responsible for other deaths at the nursing home, and could possibly be behind his sister's death as well.

== Police response ==
Initial investigations were delayed, as no autopsies were performed on the victims' corpses.

== Countermeasures ==
In response to the incident, the Kawasaki city officials expressed their intention to strengthen the system by stationing multiple staff members, four in total, between the various shifts.

== See also ==
- Ayumi Kuboki, another nurse who killed in the same region, serving a life sentence
- Angel of mercy
- List of serial killers by country
