= Mitake, Shūnan, Yamaguchi =

Coordinates: 34°11′29″N 131°55′14″E

Mitake (金峰) is a small community within Shūnan, Yamaguchi Prefecture. As of July 24, 2013, the community has 16 residents. It is located in a mountainous, remote area. The village had 10 households, a community center, and a temple.

In July 2013 the Yamaguchi arson and murders took place there. Five people, or about one-third of its population, died in the incident.
