= Mieko Yoshimura =

Japanese politician

- 吉村 美栄子
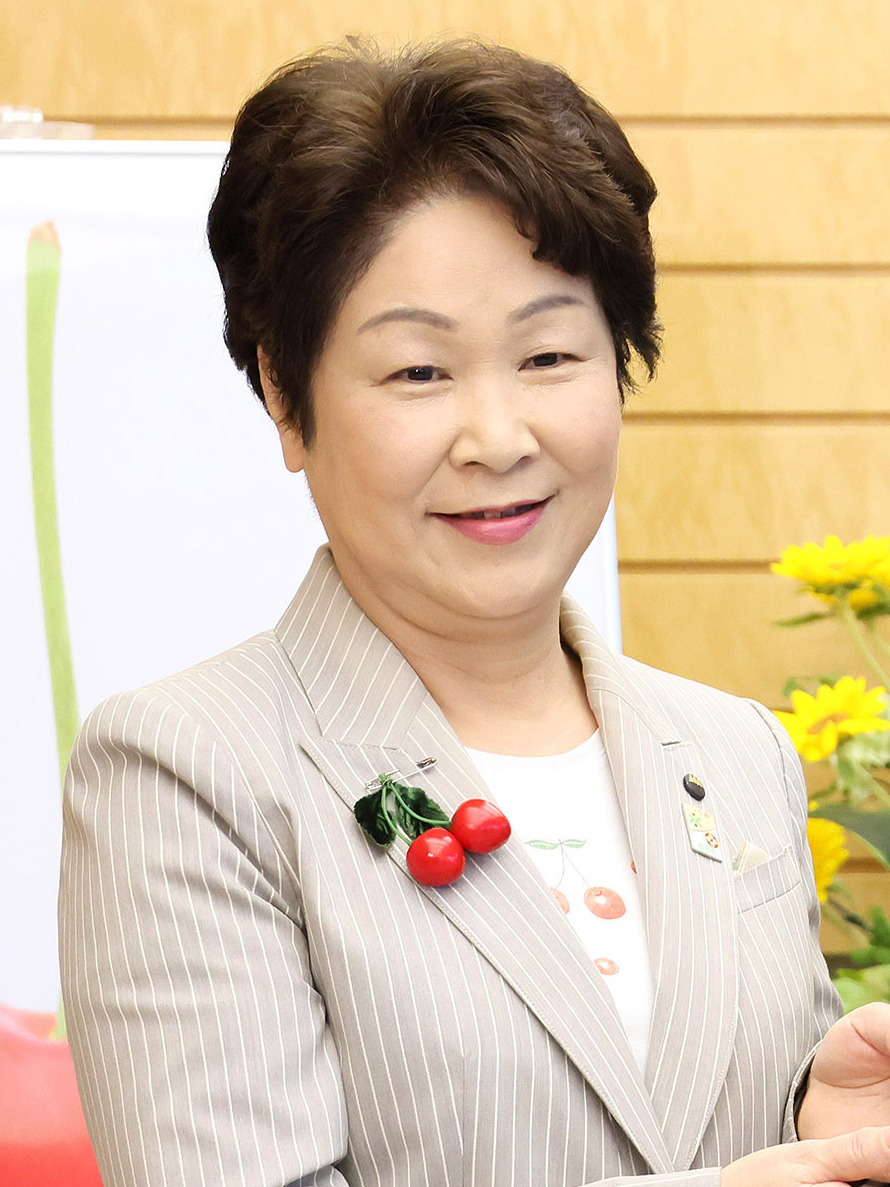
- Yoshimura in 2022

Governor of Yamagata Prefecture
- Incumbent
- Assumed office 14 February 2009
- Monarchs: Akihito; Naruhito
- Preceded by: Hiroshi Saitō

Personal details
- Born: 18 May 1951 (age 75) Ōe, Yamagata, Japan
- Party: Independent
- Other political affiliations: DP (2016–2017); DPJ (2009–2016)

Mieko Yoshimura (吉村 美栄子, Yoshimura Mieko; born 18 May 1951) is governor of Yamagata Prefecture, Japan. She was elected on 25 January 2009. She defeated the sitting governor of Yamagata Prefecture, Hiroshi Saitō in an upset. A native of Ōe, Yamagata, she worked at a help-wanted advertising company before becoming a notary public for the city government of Yamagata. She soon became a member of Yamagata Prefecture's Education Committee before running for governor in 2008. She is Yamagata's first female governor and the sixth in Japanese history.

== 2009 Election ==
Yoshimura ran as an independent. She received the support of the Democratic Party of Japan (DPJ) and various Upper House members from the Liberal Democratic Party (LDP). This race was seen as an early indicator of the strength of the two main parties in Japan before the 2009 Japanese general election. Yoshimura's rival, Governor Hiroshi Saito, was supported by both the New Komeito Party and the majority of the LDP.

== 2021 Election ==
Yoshimura was re-elected as Governor for the third time, gaining more than 70% of the vote.
