= Hiroshi Saitō (governor) =

Japanese politician (born 1957)

- 齋藤 弘
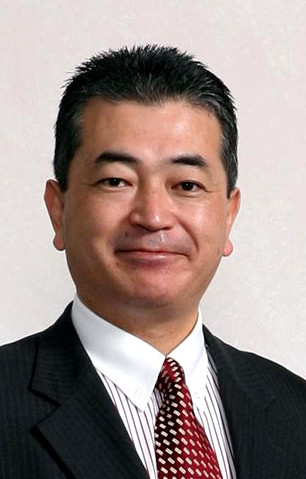
- Saitō in 2012

Governor of Yamagata Prefecture
- In office 14 February 2005 – 13 February 2009
- Monarch: Akihito
- Preceded by: Kazuo Takahashi
- Succeeded by: Mieko Yoshimura

Personal details
- Born: 18 October 1957 (age 69) Yamagata City, Yamagata, Japan
- Party: Independent
- Other political affiliations: Spirit of Japan (2010–2012)
- Education: Tokyo University of Foreign Studies; Johns Hopkins University

Hiroshi Saitō (斎藤 弘, Saitō Hiroshi; born 18 October 1957) is a Japanese politician who served as the governor of Yamagata Prefecture.

Saitō was born in Yamagata. After graduating from Tokyo University of Foreign Studies in 1981, he worked at the Bank of Japan. He received Master of International Public Policy and Master of Arts degrees from the Paul H. Nitze School of Advanced International Studies at the Johns Hopkins University in 1989 and 1990, respectively.

He was elected as governor of Yamagata in 2005, and then defeated for reelection in an upset by Mieko Yoshimura.
