= Yoshihiro Murai =

Japanese politician

- 村井 嘉浩
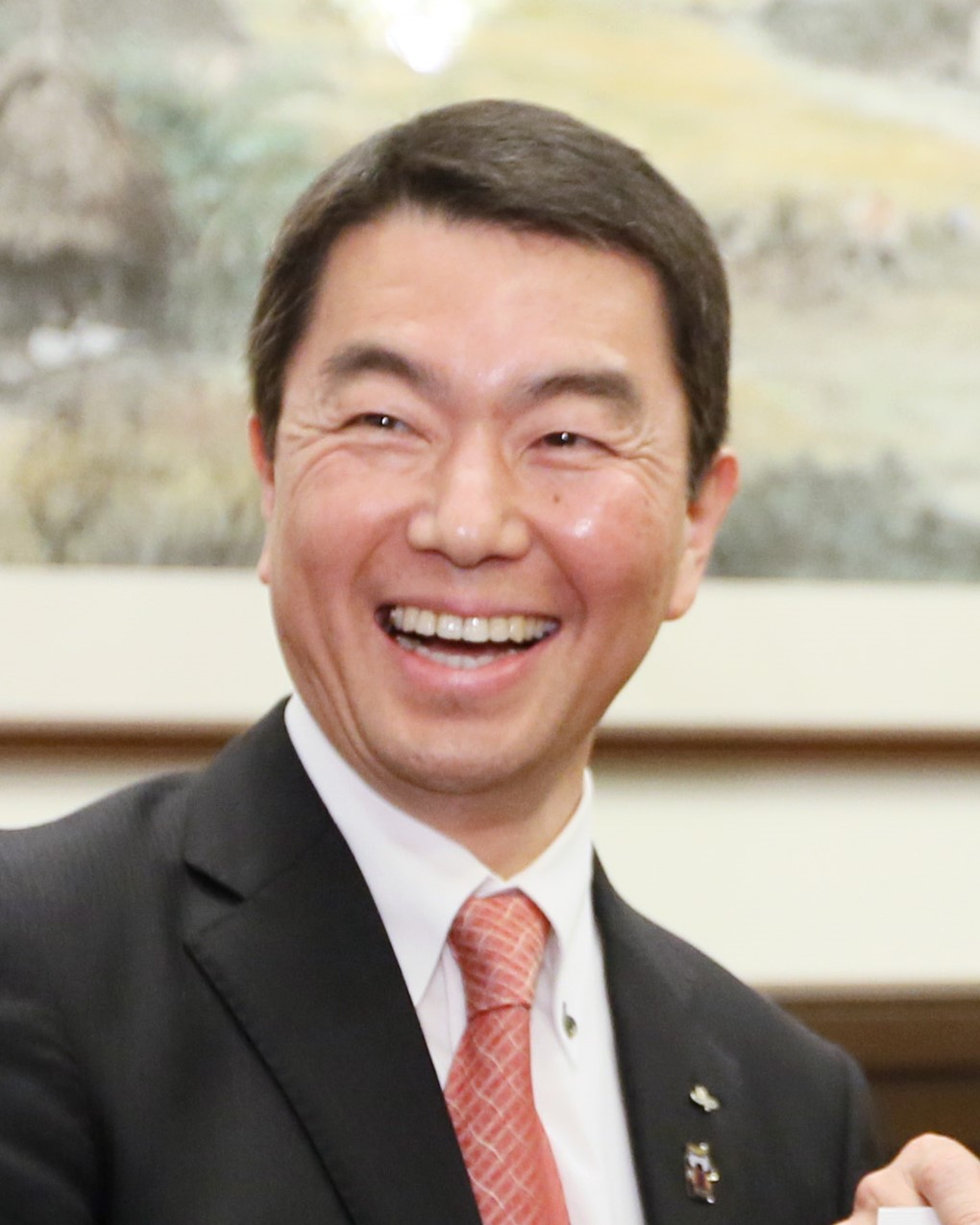
- Murai in 2015

Governor of Miyagi Prefecture
- Incumbent
- Assumed office 21 November 2005
- Monarchs: Akihito; Naruhito
- Preceded by: Shirō Asano

Member of the Miyagi Prefectural Assembly
- In office 23 April 1995 – 7 October 2005
- Constituency: Miyagino Ward

Personal details
- Born: 20 August 1960 (age 66) Toyonaka, Osaka, Japan
- Party: Liberal Democratic
- Education: National Defense Academy

Military service
- Allegiance: Japan
- Branch/service: Japan Ground Self-Defense Force
- Years of service: 1984–1992
- Rank: Captain

Yoshihiro Murai (村井 嘉浩, Murai Yoshihiro; born 20 August 1960) is a Japanese politician who has served as governor of Miyagi Prefecture since 2005. A native of Toyonaka, Osaka and a former officer in the Japan Ground Self-Defense Force, he was first elected governor in 2005 after serving in the Miyagi Prefectural Assembly since 1995.

In July 2017 Murai approved the online publication of a tourism promotion video that was created using 2011 Tōhoku earthquake and tsunami reconstruction funds and starred actress and gravure idol Mitsu Dan. Female members of the Miyagi Prefectural Assembly, along with members of the public, claimed that the video was sexually suggestive and demanded that it be taken down. Murai initially defended the video on the grounds that it successfully brought attention to the prefecture, but hundreds of complaints were filed in the month after publication, and he ordered the video withdrawn in August 2017.
