= Kazuo Takahashi (politician) =

Japanese politician (1930–2022)

- 髙橋 和雄

Governor of Yamagata Prefecture
- In office 14 February 1993 – 13 February 2005
- Monarch: Akihito
- Preceded by: Seiichirō Itagaki
- Succeeded by: Hiroshi Saitō

Personal details
- Born: 2 July 1930 Yamagata, Japan
- Died: 8 January 2022 (aged 91) Yamagata, Japan
- Party: Independent
- Education: Tohoku University

Kazuo Takahashi (Japanese: 高橋和雄 Takahashi Kazuo; 2 July 1930 – 8 January 2022) was a Japanese politician.

== Life and career ==
An independent, he served as governor of Yamagata Prefecture from 1993 to 2005. He died on 8 January 2022, at the age of 91.
