= Wakayama curry-poisoning incident =

1998 mass murder in Japan

- Native name: 和歌山毒物カレー事件
- Location: 34.1535644°N 135.1123586°E; Wakayama, Japan
- Date: 25 July 1998; 28 years ago 17:50 – c. 19:00 (JST)
- Attack type: Poisoning
- Weapon: Arsenous acid
- Deaths: 4
- Injuries: 63
- Charges: Murder, attempted murder, fraud
- Convicted: Masumi Hayashi

The Wakayama curry-poisoning incident refers to a criminal poisoning case that occurred on 25 July 1998 at a matsuri summer celebration in Wakayama, Japan. A communal pot of curry was intentionally contaminated with lethal amounts of arsenic, leading to the hospitalization of 67 attendants, of whom four died.

Three months after the poisoning, 37-year-old Masumi Hayashi (林 眞須美, Hayashi Masumi) was apprehended as the perpetrator based on witness accounts. She was convicted of murder and sentenced to death. Hayashi maintained her innocence and repeatedly sought retrial.

== Crime ==
A communal pot of curry being served to residents of Sonobe district, Wakayama, was poisoned with at least 130 grams of arsenic. Two children and two adults died after consuming the curry, and 63 others suffered from acute arsenic poisoning.

== Victims ==
The fatalities were 64-year-old Takatoshi Taninaka and 53-year-old Takaaki Tanaka (council president and vice president of Wakayama, respectively), 10-year-old Hirotaka Hayashi, and 16-year-old Miyuki Torii.

== Investigation ==
Attention quickly focused on Masumi Hayashi (born 22 July 1961), as a witness had seen her at the curry pot, and she had easy access to arsenic because her husband was an insect exterminator. Prior to the murders, Hayashi had been an insurance saleswoman. After her arrest, she and her husband were indicted on a number of insurance fraud charges as well. Hayashi has also been tried for three other attempted murders by poison that had occurred during the previous 10 years, with the motive in those cases being life-insurance benefits. She is believed to have tried to kill her husband at least once. Her motive for poisoning the curry has been said to be anger at her neighbours for shunning her family.

A blue paper cup containing traces of arsenous acid was recovered from the garbage at the festival. The arsenous acid was found to be "very similar" in composition to various arsenic samples from household items recovered at the Hayashi home.

Suspicions also arose that she had poisoned an employee working under her in 1985.

== Trial ==
At her trial she pleaded innocent, but Wakayama District Court sentenced her to death in 2002. On 29 June 2005, Osaka High Court upheld her death sentence. However, her lawyers (Yoshihiro Yasuda among them) insisted on her innocence because only circumstantial evidence existed.

On 21 April 2009, the Supreme Court of Japan rejected her final appeal.

In July 2009, Hayashi formally petitioned for a retrial. Wakayama District Court rejected her petition in March 2017. Hayashi appealed to Osaka High Court by April 2017, but the request was rejected. A third petition for retrial was filed in June 2021.

== Impact ==
The crime inspired a wave of copycat poisonings.

On 9 June 2021, Hayashi's 37-year-old daughter jumped off a bridge at Kansai Airport, killing herself and her four-year-old daughter. The woman's eldest daughter, 16 years old, was found bludgeoned to death earlier the same day.

== In popular culture ==
The 1998 Wakayama poison curry incident was the primary inspiration for Japanese screenwriter Hisashi Nozawa's 1999 television drama "Kōri no Sekai", starring Yutaka Takenouchi and Nanako Matsushima. The television drama depicts an insurance investigator who investigates an insurance-related murder case.
