= Osaka movie theatre fire =

2008 arson in Osaka, Japan

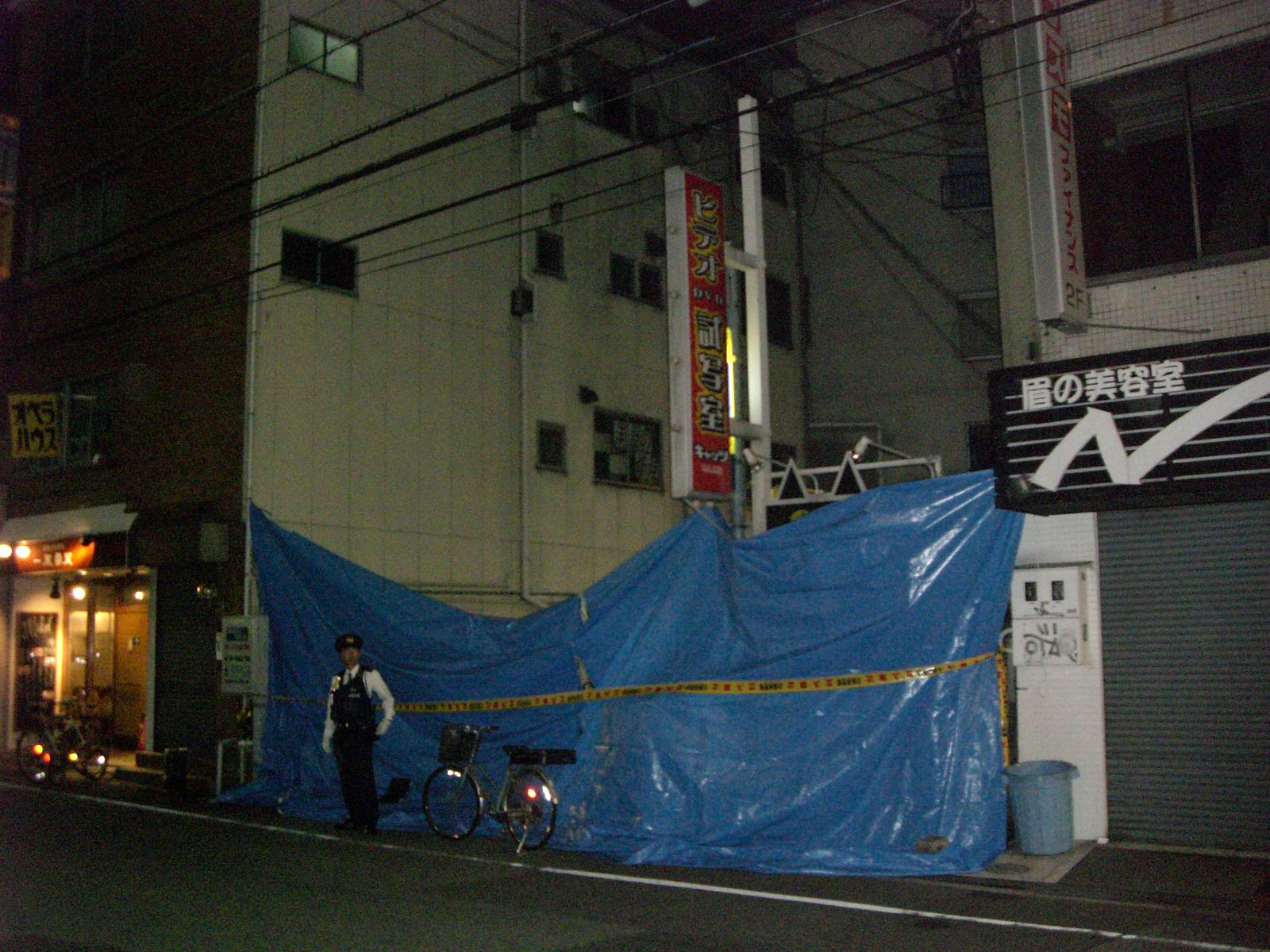
- Aftermath of the arson
- Native name: 大阪個室ビデオ店放火事件
- Location: 34°39′44″N 135°30′02″E; Nanbanaka 3-chome, Naniwa-ku, Osaka, Osaka, Japan
- Date: 1 October 2008
- Deaths: 16
- Injuries: 9
- Property damage: 1 floor of a building burnt down
- Perpetrator: Kazuhiro Ogawa

On 1 October 2008 at around 3 a.m., an adult video arcade in Osaka was set on fire deliberately. As a result, sixteen victims died and nine more were injured.

== Incident ==
The fire took place at an adult video arcade in Nanba, Osaka. The business, called Cats, rented out 32 small rooms, which cost $15 a night (or ¥1500), according to the New York Times. There were 26 customers and three employees in the store when the fire began.

Some 120 firefighters fought the blaze and extinguished it in 90 minutes. The theatre rooms, each equipped with a cot, were used as a cheap hotel by customers. The rooms in the video store were located in a narrow hallway with only a single exit via the reception. There were no sprinklers or smoke ventilation, and the video's manager turned off the alarm after the fire broke out as he thought it was a false alarm.

The fire resulted in the deaths of 15 of the people in the store due to carbon monoxide poisoning, with an additional 10 others sustaining injuries. Of the 10 injured, one of the victims, Hirokatsu Igawa from Uda, Nara, died on the morning of 14 October, also due to carbon monoxide poisoning, bringing the death count to 16.

== Motive, trial, sentencing ==
The perpetrator, Kazuhiro Ogawa (born 1962), a 46-year-old Osaka man, told police that he started the fire after deciding to commit suicide. However, he got scared, and ran away as smoke filled his room. Ogawa said he was depressed because he was living on welfare and that he "thought my life would be meaningless." Despite initially admitting the allegations, Ogawa pleaded innocent saying "I did not commit arson" and "I admitted to the arson thinking that it was because of my own cigarette" at his trial. Ogawa was found guilty on 21 November 2009, and was sentenced to death on 17 December.

Ogawa's death sentence was upheld by the Osaka High Court in 2011. In 2014, the Supreme court rejected Ogawa's appeal, judge Tomoyuki Yokota stated "an extremely large number of casualties is serious, and the impact and anxiety on society is great" and that "There is no reason to consider the motives and circumstances behind the decision to commit suicide." As of 2022, Ogawa awaits execution on death row.
