= 1922 in Japan =

- Decades: 1900s; 1910s; 1920s; 1930s; 1940s
- See also: Other events of 1922; History of Japan; Timeline; Years

Events from the year 1922 in Japan. It corresponds to Taishō 11 (大正11年) in the Japanese calendar.

== Incumbents ==
- Emperor: Taishō
- Regent: Hirohito
- Prime Minister:
  - Takahashi Korekiyo (until June 12)
  - Katō Tomosaburō (from June 12)

=== Governors ===
- Aichi Prefecture: Hikoji Kawaguchi
- Akita Prefecture: Ryoshin Nao (until 16 October); Masao Kishimoto (starting 16 October)
- Aomori Prefecture: Yujiro Ozaki
- Ehime Prefecture: Juunosuke Miyazaki
- Fukui Prefecture: Josuke Shiraogawa
- Fukushima Prefecture:
  - until 14 June: Miyata Mitsuo
  - 14 June-16 October: Toshio Mawatari
  - starting 16 October: Iwata Mamoru
- Gifu Prefecture: Manpei Ueda
- Gunma Prefecture: Muneyoshi Oshiba (until 16 October); Yamaoka Kunitoshi (starting 16 October)
- Hiroshima Prefecture: Ichiro Yoda (until 16 October); Kamehiko Abe (starting 16 October)
- Ibaraki Prefecture: Genjiro Moriya
- Iwate Prefecture: Takeo Kakinuma (until 16 October); Ushidzuka Torataro (starting 16 October)
- Kagawa Prefecture: Yoshibumi Satake (until 24 October); Shuji Sasaki (starting 24 October)
- Kanagawa Prefecture: Yasukouchi Asakichi (starting month unknown)
- Kochi Prefecture: Abe Yoshihiko (until 16 October); Toyoji Obata (starting 16 October)
- Kumamoto Prefecture: Sansuke Nakayama (until 16 October); Tadahiko Okada (starting 16 October)
- Kyoto Prefecture: Raizo Wakabayashi (until October); Tokikazu Ikematsu (starting October)
- Mie Prefecture: Haruki Yamawaki (until 16 October); Saburo Shibata (starting 16 October)
- Miyagi Prefecture: Yuichiro Chikaraishi
- Miyazaki Prefecture: Goro Sugiyama (until 16 October); Muneyoshi Oshiba (starting 16 October)
- Nagano Prefecture: Toshio Honma
- Niigata Prefecture: Ota Masahiro
- Okayama Prefecture: Masao Kishimoto
- Okinawa Prefecture: Jyun Wada
- Saga Prefecture: Tominaga
- Saitama Prefecture: Horiuchi Hidetaro
- Shiname Prefecture: Sanehide Takarabe
- Tochigi Prefecture: Hiroyoshi Hiratsuka (until 16 October); Haruki Yamawaki (starting 16 October)
- Tokyo: Katsuo Usami
- Toyama Prefecture: Shida Jisho (until 26 September); Kihachiro Ito (starting 26 September)
- Yamagata Prefecture: Morimoto Izumi (until 16 October); Agata Shinobu (starting 16 October)
- Yamanashi Prefecture: Miki Nagano (until month unknown)

== Events ==
- February 3 – According to Railway Ministry of Japan official confirmed report, A surface avalanche hit a passenger train near by Katsuyama shelter in Utatonami (now Itoigawa), Niigata Prefecture. There were 90 fatalities and 40 people were hurt.
- February 6 – Washington Naval Treaty signed between the United States, United Kingdom, Japan, France and Italy. Japan returns some of its control over the Shandong Peninsula to China.
- February 11 – Ezaki Glico was founded.
- May 1 – Kinjōtei Bakery, as predecessor of Fuji Bakery was founded in Nagoya.
- July – Shinano River incident
- August 8 – Shogakukan was founded.
- August 28 – Japan withdrew troops from the Siberian Intervention
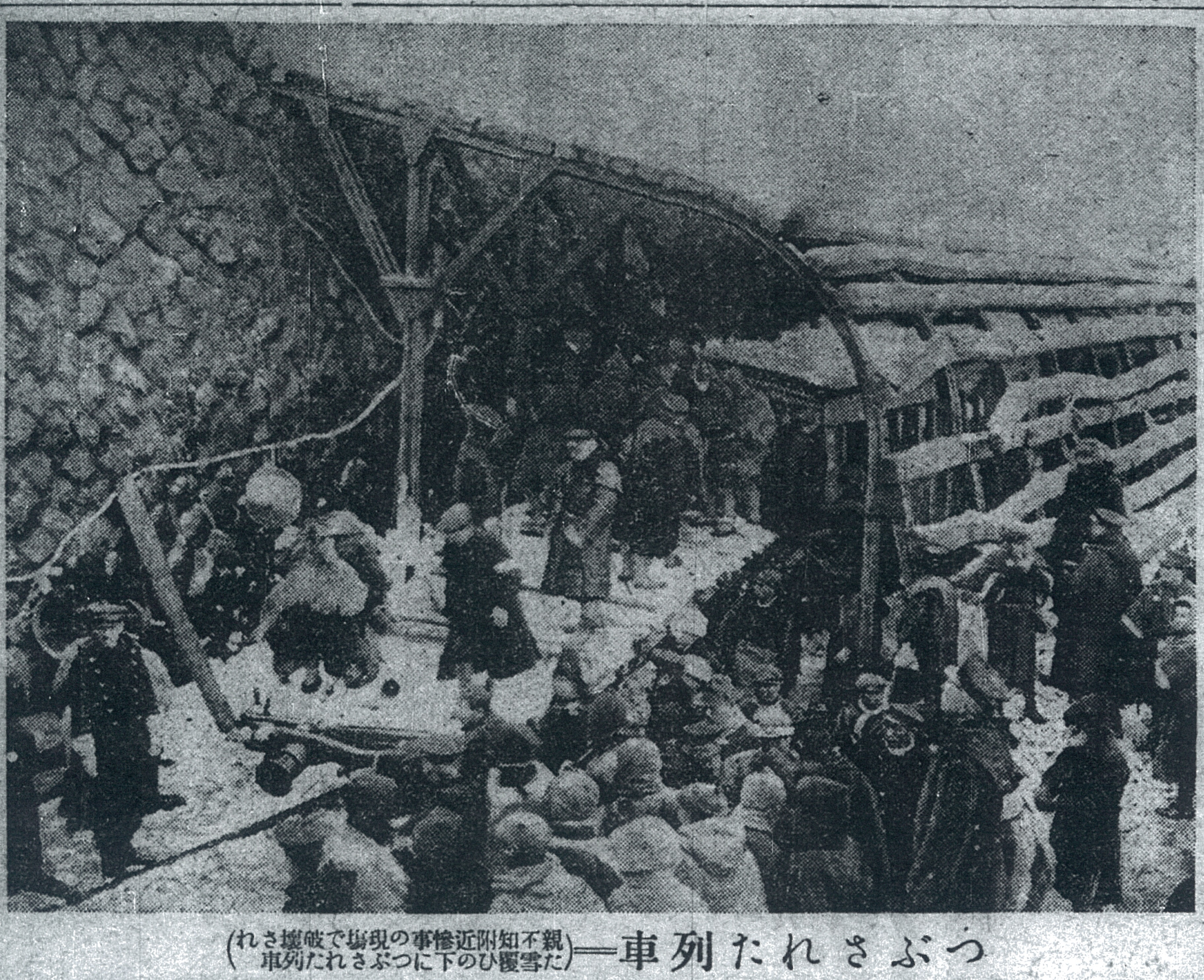
A surface avalanche hit to passenger train in Hokuriku Line (current Echigo Tokimeki Railway Line) in Niigata Prefecture on February 4.

== Births ==
- January 4 – Futaro Yamada, author (d. 2001)
- February 20 – Hitoshi Motoshima, mayor of Nagasaki (d. 2014)
- March 8 – Mizuki Shigeru, manga author and historian (d. 2015)
- March 20 – Terada Kiyoyuki, aikido teacher (d. 2009)
- April 25 – Ayako Miura, novelist (d. 1999)
- May 15 – Jakucho Setouchi, Buddhist nun, writer and activist (d. 2021)
- June 18 – Donald Keene, scholar, historian, and translator (d. 2019)
- August 27 – Sōsuke Uno, Prime Minister of Japan (d. 1998)
- September 16 – Kenichi Yamamoto, mechanical engineer and business executive (d. 2017)
- October 14 – Yumeji Tsukioka, film actress (d. 2017)

== Deaths ==
- January 10 – Ōkuma Shigenobu, politician and Prime Minister of Japan (b. 1838)
- February 1 – Yamagata Aritomo, field marshal and Prime Minister of Japan (b. 1838)
- February 8 – Kabayama Sukenori, samurai, military leader and politician (b. 1837)
- June 20 – Aeba Koson, author, theater critic, and calligraphy master (b. 1855)
- June 27 – Prince Higashifushimi Yorihito, marshal admiral (b. 1867)
- July 8 – Mori Ōgai, novelist, poet, translator and army surgeon (b. 1862)
- July 22 – Takamine Jōkichi, chemist (b. 1854)
- September 18 – Yukie Chiri, Ainu transcriber and translator (b. 1903)

== See also ==
- 1922 in Japanese football
- List of Japanese films of the 1920s
