= List of Tochigi Governors =

The following is a list of governors of the Tochigi Prefecture.

The first governor of Tochigi Prefecture was appointed by the Meiji government on November 13, 1871, following the merging of the previous, short-lived Utsunomiya and Tochigi Prefectures. Governors of Tochigi were politically appointed from 1871 until the post-war period starting in 1947, after which they were popularly elected.

Names are written in the Japanese style, family name first.

== Appointed governors ==
- Nabeshima Miki (Nov 13, 1871 - Oct 29, 1880)
- Fujikawa Tamechika (Oct 29, 1880 - Oct 30, 1883)
- Mishima Michitsune (Oct 30, 1883 - Jan 22, 1885)
- Kabayama Sukeo (Jan 22, 1885 - Dec 23, 1889)
- Orita Heinai (Dec 24, 1889 - Jan 20, 1894)
- Satō Shin (Jan 20, 1894 - Apr 7, 1897)
- Egi Kazuyuki (Apr 7, 1897 - Nov 13, 1897)
- Chikami Kiyoomi (Nov 13, 1897 - Aug 9, 1898)
- Hagino Samon (Aug 9, 1898 - Jan 13, 1899)
- Mizobe Iiku (Jan 13, 1899 - Dec 29, 1902)
- Sugai Masami (Dec 30, 1902 - Jan 25, 1904)
- Shirani Takeshi (Jan 25, 1904 - Aug 10, 1906)
- Kubota Kiyochika (Aug 10, 1906 - Dec 7, 1906)
- Nakayama Miyozō (Dec 7, 1906 - Aug 11, 1911)
- Okada Bunji (Aug 11, 1911 - June 5, 1914)
- Kitagawa Nobutsugu (June 5, 1914 - June 2, 1916)
- Hiratsuka Hiroyoshi (June 2, 1916 - Oct 16, 1922)
- Yamawaki Haruki (Oct 16, 1922 - June 13, 1924)
- Ōtsuka Isei (June 13, 1924 - Sept 28, 1926)
- Fujioka Hyōichi (Sept 28, 1926 - May 17, 1927)
- Beppu Sōtarō (May 17, 1927 - June 29, 1928)
- Fujiyama Takeichi (June 29, 1928 - July 5, 1929)
- Morioka Jirō (July 5, 1929 - Nov 8, 1929)
- Harada Iori (Nov 8, 1929 - Jan 20, 1931)
- Asari Saburō (Jan 20, 1931 - Dec 27, 1931)
- Toyoshima Chōkichi (Dec 27, 1931 - June 28, 1932)
- Nagarai Kiyoshi (June 28, 1932 - July 10, 1934)
- Kayaba Gunzō (July 10, 1934 - Mar 13, 1936)
- Matsumura Mitsuma (Mar 13, 1936 - Sept 30, 1937)
- Adachi Osamu (Oct 1, 1937 - Apr 8, 1940)
- Yamagata Saburō (Apr 9, 1940 - Jan 9, 1942)
- Sakurai Yasuemon (Jan 9, 1942 - July 1, 1943)
- Azumi Tokuya (July 1, 1943 - Nov 1, 1944)
- Sōma Toshio (Nov 1, 1944 - Jan 24, 1946)
- Ogawa Kimchi (Jan 25, 1946 - Mar 5, 1947)
- Ikeda Kiyoshi (Mar 11, 1947 - April 12, 1947)

== Elected governors ==
- Kodaira Jyūkichi (April 12, 1947 - Feb 5, 1955) (two terms)
- Ogawa Kiichi (Feb 5, 1955 - Feb 4, 1959) (his second term after an earlier term as appointed Governor)
- Yokokawa Nobuo (Feb 5, 1959 - Dec 7, 1974) (four terms)
- Funada Yuzuru (Dec 8, 1974 - Dec 8, 1984) (three terms)
- Watanabe Fumio (Dec 9, 1984 - Dec 8, 2000) (four terms)
- Fukuda Akio (Dec 9, 2000 - Dec 8, 2004) (one term)
- Fukuda Tomikazu (Dec 9, 2004 – present) (five terms)
