= 1890 in Japan =

- Decades: 1870s; 1880s; 1890s; 1900s; 1910s
- See also: Other events of 1890; History of Japan • Timeline • Years

Events in the year 1890 in Japan.

== Incumbents ==
- Monarch: Emperor Meiji
- Prime Minister: Yamagata Aritomo

=== Governors ===
- Aichi Prefecture: Baron Takatoshi Iwamura then Kojiro Iwasaki
- Akita Prefecture: Kojiro Iwasaki then Baron Akira Suzuki
- Aomori Prefecture: Masa Sawa
- Ehime Prefecture: Katsumata Minoru
- Fukui Prefecture: Toshitsuna Adashi
- Fukuoka Prefecture: Yasujo
- Fukushima Prefecture: Nobumichi Yamada
- Gifu Prefecture: Toshi Kozaki
- Gunma Prefecture: Sato Atasesan
- Hiroshima Prefecture: Nabeshima Miki
- Ibaraki Prefecture: Sadanori Yasuda
- Iwate Prefecture: Shoichiro Ishii
- Kagawa Prefecture: Yawara Shibahara
- Kochi Prefecture: Baron Hiroi Hirotake
- Kumamoto Prefecture: Takaaki Tomioka
- Kyoto Prefecture: Baron Kokudo Kitagaki
- Mie Prefecture: Shangyi Narukawa
- Miyagi Prefecture: Matsudaira Masanao
- Miyazaki Prefecture: Takayoshi Kyoganu
- Nagano Prefecture: Baron Utsumi Tadakatsu
- Niigata Prefecture: Senda Sada Akatsuki
- Oita Prefecture: Ryokichi Nishimura
- Okinawa Prefecture: Kanji Maruoka
- Osaka Prefecture: Sutezo Nishimura
- Saga Prefecture: Sukeo Kabayama
- Saitama Prefecture: Eitaro Komatsubara
- Shiname Prefecture: Sada Kotedayasu
- Tochigi Prefecture: Orita Hirauchi
- Tokyo: Marquis Shigeru Hachisuke then Tomita Tetsunosuke
- Toyama Prefecture: Fujishima Masaki then Fujishima Masaki
- Yamagata Prefecture: Hasebe Ren

== Events ==
- February unknown date – Kubota founded in Nishi-ku, Osaka.
- July 1 – 1890 Japanese general election; Empire of Japan’s first general election for members of the House of Representatives of the Diet of Japan. It was the first example of a popularly elected national assembly in Asia
- November 25 – The first Diet session is held.
- Unknown date – Ōshita Kaishunō, as predecessor of Fumakillar, an insecticide manufacturing and sales brand, founded in Hiroshima.

== Births ==
- January 15 – Michiaki Kamada, admiral (d. 1947)
- January 28 – Fusako, Princess Kane, seventh daughter of Emperor Meiji (d. 1974)
- September 30 – Chieko Higashiyama, film actress (d. 1980)
- November 3 – Yamakawa Kikue, activist, writer, socialist, and feminist (d. 1980)

== Deaths ==
- January 23 – Joseph Hardy Neesima, educator (b. 1843)
- June 2 – Matsudaira Yoshinaga, daimyō (b. 1828)
