= 1891 in Japan =

- Decades: 1870s; 1880s; 1890s; 1900s; 1910s
- See also: Other events of 1891; History of Japan; Timeline; Years

Events from the year 1891 in Japan. It corresponds to Meiji 24 (明治24年) in the Japanese calendar.

== Incumbents ==
- Emperor: Emperor Meiji
- Prime Minister: Yamagata Aritomo (until May 6), Matsukata Masayoshi (starting May 6)

=== Governors ===
- Aichi Prefecture: Takatoshi Iwamura
- Akita Prefecture: Baron Akira Suzuki then Shinichi Hirose then Yasuhiko Hirayama
- Aomori Prefecture: Masa Sawa
- Ehime Prefecture: Katsumata Minoru
- Fukui Prefecture: Toshitsuna Adashi then Nobuaki Makino then Kunizo Arakawa
- Fukuoka Prefecture: Yasujo
- Fukushima Prefecture: Nobumichi Yamada then Kiyoshi Watanabe
- Gifu Prefecture: Toshi Kozaki
- Gunma Prefecture: Sato Atasesan then Motootoko Nakamura
- Hiroshima Prefecture: Nabeshima Miki
- Ibaraki Prefecture: Sadanori Yasuda then Shoichiro Ishii
- Iwate Prefecture: Shoichiro Ishii then Ichizo Hattori
- Kagawa Prefecture: Yawara Shibahara then Masao Tanimori
- Kochi Prefecture: Baron Hiroi Hirotake
- Kumamoto Prefecture: Takaaki Tomioka then Matsudaira Masanao
- Kyoto Prefecture: Baron Kokudo Kitagaki
- Mie Prefecture: Shangyi Narukawa
- Miyagi Prefecture: Matsudaira Masanao then Mamoru Funakoshi
- Miyazaki Prefecture: Takayoshi Kyoganu then Yakichi Nagamine
- Nagano Prefecture: Baron Utsumi Tadakatsu then Baron Utsumi Tadakatsu
- Niigata Prefecture: Senda Sada Akatsuki then Baron Seung Zhi Kuwata
- Oita Prefecture: Ryokichi Nishimura then Baron Shirane Senitsu
- Okinawa Prefecture: Kanji Maruoka
- Osaka Prefecture: Sutezo Nishimura then Nobumichi Yamada
- Saga Prefecture: Sukeo Kabayama
- Saitama Prefecture: Eitaro Komatsubara then Kanichi Kubota
- Shiname Prefecture: Sada Kotedayasu then Goro Shinozaki
- Tochigi Prefecture: Orita Hirauchi
- Tokyo: Tomita Tetsunosuke
- Toyama Prefecture: Fujishima Masaki then Moriyama Shigeru
- Yamagata Prefecture: Moriyama Shigeru

== Events ==
- Mino–Owari earthquake

== Births ==
- May 18 – Sadamichi Kajioka, admiral (d. 1944)
- June 2 – Takijirō Ōnishi, admiral known as the father of the kamikaze (d. 1945)
- July 7 – Tadamichi Kuribayashi, general and haiku poet (d. 1945)
- August 25 – Yoshihide Hayashi, general (d. 1978)
- September 27 – Sōsaku Suzuki, general (d. 1978)
- October 12 – Fumimaro Konoe, prime minister during World War II (died 1945)
- October 15 – Tadashige Daigo, vice-admiral (d. 1947))
- October 17 – Yasuyo Yamasaki, general (d. 1945)
- December 6 – Masatomi Kimura, admiral (d. 1960}

== Deaths ==
- February 18 – Sanjō Sanetomi (b. 1837)
