= 1947 in Japan =

- Decades: 1920s; 1930s; 1940s; 1950s; 1960s
- See also: Other events of 1947; History of Japan; Timeline; Years

Events in the year 1947 in Japan.

== Incumbents ==
- Supreme Commander Allied Powers: Douglas MacArthur
- Emperor: Hirohito
- Prime Minister: Shigeru Yoshida (Peer–Imperial appointment) until May 24, Tetsu Katayama (S–Kanagawa)
- Chief Justice of the Supreme Court: Tadahiko Mibuchi from August 4
- Diet (Empire of Japan)
  - President of the House of Representatives: Takeshi Yamazaki (L–Ibaraki) until March 31
  - President of the House of Peers: Iemasa Tokugawa (Kayōkai–Prince) until May 2
  - Imperial Diet sessions: 92nd (regular session opened in December 1946, until March 31)
- Diet (State of Japan)
  - President of the House of Representatives: Komakichi Matsuoka (S–Tokyo) from May 24
  - President of the House of Councillors: Tsuneo Matsudaira (Ryokufūkai–Fukushima) from May 20
  - Diet sessions: 1st (special, May 20 to December 9), 2nd (regular, from December 10 to 1948)

=== Governors ===
- Aichi Prefecture: Hideo Aoyagi (starting 12 April)
- Akita Prefecture: Kosaku Hasuike (starting 12 April)
- Aomori Prefecture: Bunji Tsushima (starting 12 April)
- Chiba Prefecture: Tamenosuke Kawaguchi (starting 12 April)
- Ehime Prefecture: Juushin Aoki (starting 12 April)
- Fukui Prefecture: Harukazu Obata (starting 12 April)
- Fukuoka Prefecture: Katsuji Sugimoto (starting 12 April)
- Fukushima Prefecture: Kan'ichirō Ishihara (starting 12 April)
- Gifu Prefecture: Kamon Muto (starting 12 April)
- Gunma Prefecture: Shigeo Kitano (starting 12 April)
- Hiroshima Prefecture: Tsunei Kusunose (starting 12 April)
- Hokkaido Prefecture: Toshifumi Tanaka (starting 12 April)
- Hyogo Prefecture: Yukio Kishida (starting 12 April)
- Ibaraki Prefecture: Yoji Tomosue (starting 12 April)
- Ishikawa Prefecture: Wakio Shibano (starting 12 April)
- Iwate Prefecture: Kenkichi Kokubun (starting 12 April)
- Kagawa Prefecture: Keikichi Masuhara (starting 16 April)
- Kagoshima Prefecture: Kaku Shigenari (starting 5 April)
- Kanagawa Prefecture: Iwataro Uchiyama (starting 16 April)
- Kochi Prefecture: Wakaji Kawamura (starting 12 April and ending 11 November)
- Kumamoto Prefecture: Saburō Sakurai (starting 12 April)
- Kyoto Prefecture: Atsushi Kimura (starting 12 April)
- Mie Prefecture: Masaru Aoki (starting 12 April)
- Miyagi Prefecture: Saburō Chiba (starting 12 April)
- Miyazaki Prefecture: Tadao Annaka (starting 12 April)
- Nagano Prefecture: Torao Hayashi (starting 12 April)
- Nagasaki Prefecture: Sōjirō Sugiyama (starting 16 April)
- Nara Prefecture: Mansaku Nomura (starting 21 April)
- Niigata Prefecture: Shohei Okada (starting 21 April)
- Oita Prefecture: Tokuju Hosoda (starting 12 April)
- Okayama Prefecture: Hirokichi Nishioka (starting 16 April)
- Osaka Prefecture: Bunzō Akama (starting 12 April)
- Saga Prefecture: Gen'ichi Okimori (starting 12 April)
- Saitama Prefecture: Mizo Nishimura (starting 12 April)
- Shiga Prefecture: Iwakichi Hattori (starting 12 April)
- Shiname Prefecture: Fujiro Hara (starting 16 April)
- Shizuoka Prefecture: Takeji Kobayashi (starting 12 April)
- Tochigi Prefecture: Juukichi Kodaira (starting 12 April)
- Tokushima Prefecture: Goro Abe (starting 16 April)
- Tokyo Prefecture: Seiichirō Yasui (starting 14 April)
- Tottori Prefecture: Aiji Nishio (starting 12 April)
- Toyama Prefecture: Tetsuji Tachi (starting 19 April)
- Wakayama Prefecture: Shinji Ono (starting 15 April)
- Yamagata Prefecture: Michio Murayama (starting 12 April)
- Yamaguchi Prefecture: Tatsuo Tanaka (starting 16 April)
- Yamanashi Prefecture: Katsuyasu Yoshie (starting 12 April)

== Events ==
- February 25: Hachikō Line derailment
- February 28: February 28 incident in Taiwan
- April 5: In the first phase of the first unified regional elections the governors of all 46 prefectures are elected directly for the first time. Also up are mayors of municipalities across the country.
- March 3: Sekisui Chemical was founded.
- April 20: First election for the House of Councillors. 111 of 250 seats are won by non-affiliated candidates.
- April 25: 23rd Election for House of Representatives. Socialist Party wins 143 of 466 seats, followed by Liberal Party with 131 and Democratic Party with 124.
- April 30: In the second phase of the unified regional elections prefectural and municipal assemblies are elected.
- May 3: Constitution of Japan goes into effect.
- May 24: Tetsu Katayama becomes prime minister.
- August 4: Supreme Court of Japan established.
- September 14–16 – According to Japanese government official confirmed report, Typhoon Kathleen, an embankment collapse and flash flood occur around Saitama Prefecture, a debris flow and landslide occurred in Ashikaga, Ichinoseki and Mount Akagi area, resulting to toll death number was 1,930 persons, 1,547 persons were wounded.

=== Full date unknown ===
- IB Daiwa Corporation is founded.

== Births ==
- January 1 – Hideaki Yanagida, wrestler
- January 18
  - Takeshi Kitano, comedian, actor and director
  - Sachio Kinugasa, professional baseball player (d.2018)
- January 22 – Senichi Hoshino, professional baseball pitcher and coach (d. 2018)
- February 5 – Teruhiko Saigō, singer and actor
- February 11
  - Yukio Hatoyama, politician
  - Yuji Nunokawa, film director (d.2022)
- February 22 – Masahara Nakagawa, politician
- March 6 – Teru Miyamoto, author
- March 20 – Tamio Kageyama, novelist (died 1998)
- March 21 – Kazuhiko Katō, musician (died 2009)
- March 24 – Meiko Kaji, actress
- April 9 – Kazuko Sugiyama, voice actress
- June 10 – Hitoshi Igarashi, scholar (died 1991)
- September 20 – Kazumasa Oda, singer
- September 26 – Tadayoshi Yokota, volleyball player
- September 28 – Keishi Suzuki, former professional baseball pitcher
- October 7 – Reiko Kuroda, chemist
- November 4 – Toshiyuki Nishida, actor
- December 7 – Kōzō Okamoto, terrorist (d. 2026 in Lebanon)
- December 18 – Riyoko Ikeda, manga artist and singer
- December 22 – Mitsuo Tsukahara, artistic gymnast

== Deaths ==
- January 5: Osami Nagano, admiral (b. 1880)
- January 10: Sakunosuke Oda, novelist (b. 1913)
- March 10 – Harukichi Hyakutake, general (b. 1888)
- March 27: Hisakazu Tanaka (b. 1889)
- April 26: Hisao Tani, lieutenant general (b. 1882)
- June 18: Shigematsu Sakaibara, admiral (b. 1898)
- June 19: Kōsō Abe, admiral (b. 1892)
- July 13: Yone Noguchi, writer, poet, essayist and novelist (b. 1875)
- July 30: Kōda Rohan, writer and author (b. 1867)
- August 7: Masao Baba, general (b. 1892)
- September 10: Hatazō Adachi, general (b. 1890)
- October 18: Michiaki Kamada, vice-admiral (b. 1890)
- December 6: Tadashige Daigo, vice-admiral (b. 1891)
- December 30: Riichi Yokomitsu, novelist (b. 1898)

== See also ==
- List of Japanese films of the 1940s
