= 1974 in Japan =

- Decades: 1950s; 1960s; 1970s; 1980s; 1990s
- See also: Other events of 1974; History of Japan • Timeline • Years

Events in the year 1974 in Japan. It corresponds to Shōwa 49 (昭和49年) in the Japanese calendar.

== Incumbents ==
- Emperor: Hirohito
- Prime minister: Kakuei Tanaka (Liberal Democratic) until December 9, Takeo Miki (Liberal Democratic)
- Chief Cabinet Secretary: Susumu Nikaido until November 11, Noboru Takeshita until December 9, Ichitaro Ide
- Chief Justice of the Supreme Court: Tomokazu Murakami
- President of the House of Representatives: Shigesaburō Maeo
- President of the House of Councillors: Kenzō Kōno
- Diet sessions: 72nd (regular session opened on December 1, 1973, to June 3), 73rd (extraordinary, July 24 to July 31), 74th (extraordinary, December 9 to December 25), 75th (regular, December 27 to July 4, 1975)

=== Governors ===
- Aichi Prefecture: Mikine Kuwahara
- Akita Prefecture: Yūjirō Obata
- Aomori Prefecture: Shunkichi Takeuchi
- Chiba Prefecture: Taketo Tomonō
- Ehime Prefecture: Haruki Shiraishi
- Fukui Prefecture: Heidayū Nakagawa
- Fukuoka Prefecture: Hikaru Kamei
- Fukushima Prefecture: Morie Kimura
- Gifu Prefecture: Saburō Hirano
- Gunma Prefecture: Konroku Kanda
- Hiroshima Prefecture: Hiroshi Miyazawa
- Hokkaido: Naohiro Dōgakinai
- Hyogo Prefecture: Tokitada Sakai
- Ibaraki Prefecture: Nirō Iwakami
- Ishikawa Prefecture: Yōichi Nakanishi
- Iwate Prefecture: Tadashi Chida
- Kagawa Prefecture: Masanori Kaneko (until 4 September); Tadao Maekawa (starting 5 September)
- Kagoshima Prefecture: Saburō Kanemaru
- Kanagawa Prefecture: Bunwa Tsuda
- Kochi Prefecture: Masumi Mizobuchi (until 6 December); Chikara Nakauchi (starting 7 December)
- Kumamoto Prefecture: Issei Sawada
- Kyoto Prefecture: Torazō Ninagawa
- Mie Prefecture: Ryōzō Tagawa
- Miyagi Prefecture: Sōichirō Yamamoto
- Miyazaki Prefecture: Hiroshi Kuroki
- Nagano Prefecture: Gon'ichirō Nishizawa
- Nagasaki Prefecture: Kan'ichi Kubo
- Nara Prefecture: Ryozo Okuda
- Niigata Prefecture: Shiro Watari (until 30 April); Takeo Kimi (starting 1 May)
- Oita Prefecture: Masaru Taki
- Okayama Prefecture: Shiro Nagano
- Okinawa Prefecture: Chōbyō Yara
- Osaka Prefecture: Ryōichi Kuroda
- Saga Prefecture: Sunao Ikeda
- Saitama Prefecture: Yawara Hata
- Shiga Prefecture: Kinichiro Nozaki (until 6 December); Masayoshi Takemura (starting 7 December)
- Shiname Prefecture: Seiji Tsunematsu
- Shizuoka Prefecture: Yūtarō Takeyama (until 24 June); Keizaburō Yamamoto (starting 10 July)
- Tochigi Prefecture: Nobuo Yokokawa (until 7 December); Yuzuru Funada (starting 8 December)
- Tokushima Prefecture: Yasunobu Takeichi
- Tokyo: Ryōkichi Minobe
- Tottori Prefecture: Jirō Ishiba (until 22 February); Kōzō Hirabayashi (starting 27 March)
- Toyama Prefecture: Kokichi Nakada
- Wakayama Prefecture: Masao Ohashi
- Yamagata Prefecture: Seiichirō Itagaki
- Yamaguchi Prefecture: Masayuki Hashimoto
- Yamanashi Prefecture: Kunio Tanabe

== Events ==
- May 9 – A magnitude 6.9 earthquake strikes the Izu Peninsula, killing 30 and injuring 102.
- May 27 – Keyence was founded.
- June 20 – Daito Industry, as predecessor of Daito Trust Construction founded in Chikusa-ku, Nagoya.
- July 7 to 8 – According to Fire and Disaster Management Agency official confirmed report, a torrential heavy massibie rain, following debris flow and devee collapse hit in eastern Shizuoka Prefecture, 50 persons were human fatalities.
- August 30 – A powerful bomb blast occurred in the Marunouchi business area, Tokyo, resulting in 8 confirmed deaths and 376 injuries.
- November 9 – A LPG carrier, Juyo Maru 10 collision with Liberian cargo ship Pacific Ares, following caught fire in Tokyo Bay, according to Marine Safety Agency of Japan confirmed official, 33 persons lost their lives.
- December 18 – According to Japanese government official confirmed report, A petroleum tank broken in Mizushima refinery, Kurashiki, Okayama Prefecture, in affective 80,000 litter crude oil spill and contamination tide was widely Seto Inland Sea area, these place recoveries spend for more two years.

== Births ==
- January 5 – Yutaka Yoshie, professional wrestler (d. 2024)
- January 29
  - Taketo Aoki, baseball player
  - Kōji Wada, rock singer (d. 2016)
- February 7
  - Jun Seba, aka Nujabes, hip-hop producer (d. 2010)
  - Yō Yoshida, actress
- February 27 – Hiroyasu Shimizu, speed skater
- March 12 – Hekiru Shiina, voice actress and singer
- March 28 – Daisuke Kishio, voice actor
- March 30 – Miho Komatsu, essayist and singer-songwriter
- June 13 – Takahiro Sakurai, voice actor
- June 17 – Mikiyo Ōno, model, actress and J-pop singer
- July 2 – Kiyohiko Shibukawa, fashion model and actor
- August 4 – Wasabi Mizuta, voice actress
- September 29 – Hirofmi Ono, businessman (a CEO of live storming entertainment)
- October 8 – Koji Murofushi, hammer thrower
- November 8 – Masashi Kishimoto, manga author
- December 4 – Tadahito Iguchi, baseball player
- December 27 – Fumiko Orikasa, voice actress and singer

== Deaths ==
- March 1 – Kōtarō Tanaka, jurist and law professor (b. 1890)
- April 12 – Kimiko Tsumura, Noh traditional performer (b. 1902)
- August 11 – Fusako Kitashirakawa, seventh daughter of Emperor Meiji (b. 1890)
- December 24 – Sentarō Ōmori, admiral (b. 1892)

== See also ==
- 1974 in Japanese television
- List of Japanese films of 1974
- 1974 in Japanese music
