= 長安 =

長安 or 长安 is an East Asian character for a word or morpheme that means long and safety.

It may refer to:

- Chang'an, the traditional name of Xi'an
- Nagayasu, a Japanese person name
