= Etsujirō Uehara =

Japanese politician (1877–1962)

Uehara Etsujirō
- 植原 悦二郎
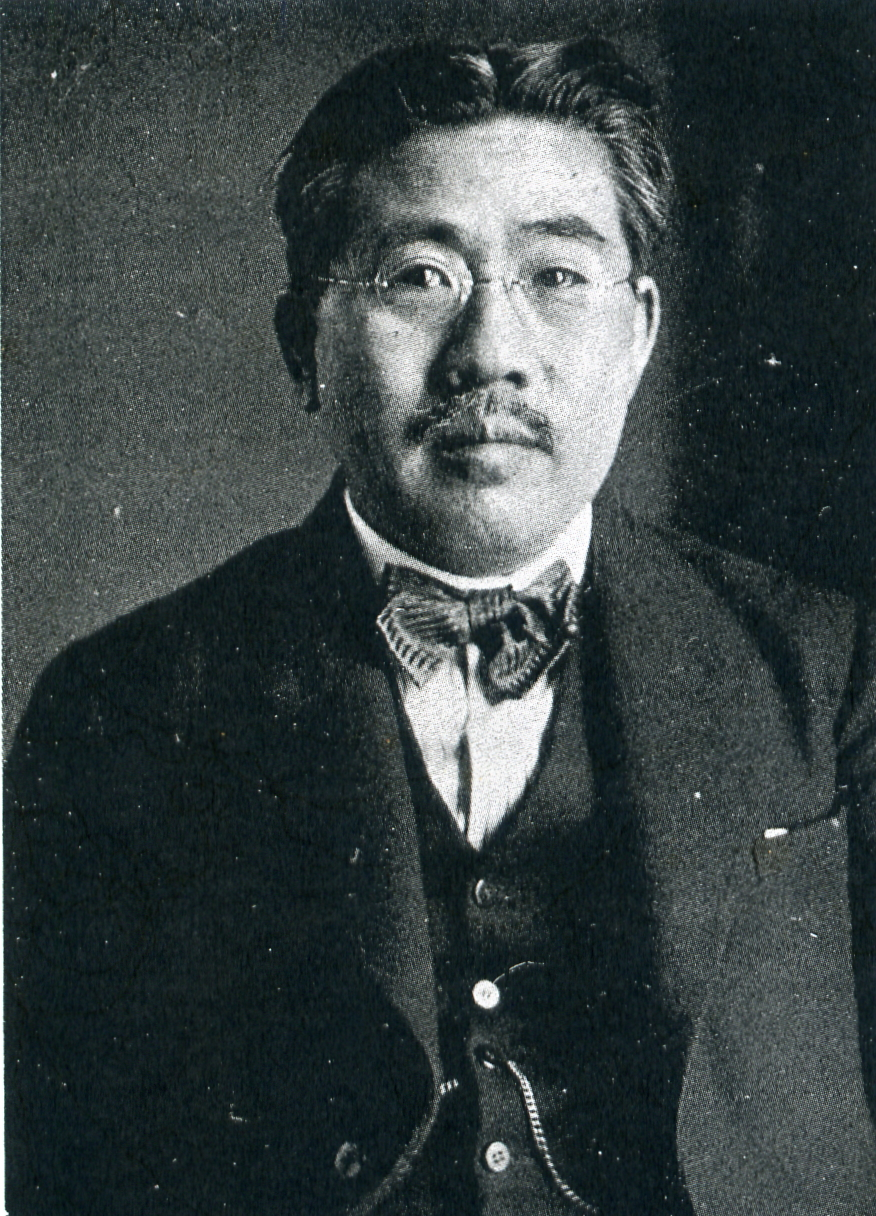
- Uehara in 1932

Minister of Home Affairs
- In office 31 January 1947 – 24 May 1947
- Prime Minister: Shigeru Yoshida
- Preceded by: Seiichi Ōmura
- Succeeded by: Tetsu Katayama (acting); Kozaemon Kimura

Vice Speaker of the House of Representatives
- In office 18 March 1932 – 21 January 1936
- Speaker: Kiyoshi Akita; Kunimatsu Hamada
- Preceded by: Giichi Masuda
- Succeeded by: Tadahiko Okada

Member of the House of Representatives
- In office 27 February 1955 – 25 April 1958
- Preceded by: Kaneshichi Masuda
- Succeeded by: Kaneshichi Masuda
- Constituency: Nagano 4th
- In office 10 April 1946 – 14 March 1953
- Preceded by: Constituency established
- Succeeded by: Tokuya Furuhata
- Constituency: Nagano at-large (1946–1947); Nagano 4th (1947–1953)
- In office 20 April 1917 – 29 April 1942
- Preceded by: Multi-member district
- Succeeded by: Tadashi Yoshida
- Constituency: Nagano Counties (1917–1920); Nagano 8th (1920–1928); Nagano 4th (1928–1942)

Personal details
- Born: 15 May 1877 Meisei, Nagano, Japan
- Died: 2 December 1962 (aged 85)
- Resting place: Aoyama Cemetery
- Party: Liberal Democratic
- Other political affiliations: Rikken Kokumintō (1917–1922); Kakushin Club (1922–1925); Rikken Seiyūkai (1925–1940); Independent (1940–1945); JLP (1945–1948); DLP (1948–1950); LP (1950–1953); LP–H (1953–1954); JDP (1954–1955)
- Education: Washington State University; London School of Economics and Political Science

Etsujirō Uehara (植原 悦二郎, Uehara Etsujirō; 15 May 1877 – 2 December 1962) was a politician and bureaucrat in the early Shōwa period Japan, who subsequently was a politician and cabinet minister in the immediate post-war era.

== Biography ==
Uehara was born in what is now the city of Azumino, Nagano. He lost his parents when he was three years old. After working for a silk mill, and the Yokohama Customs Office, he moved to the United States in 1899, working as a waiter to pay he way through high school. He also published a weekly business newsletter. In 1907, he graduated from Washington State University, continuing on to graduate school at the London School of Economics and Political Science, from his he obtained a doctorate in 1910.

After returning to Japan in 1911, Uehara worked as lecturer on political science at Meiji University, Rikkyo University and at the forerunner of Tokyo Institute of Technology in Tokyo, teaching both comparative legal theory and constitutional law. He was a supporter of the theory of popular sovereignty, which was one of the underpinnings of the Taishō democracy movement. He was elected to a seat in the lower house of the Diet of Japan in the 1917 General Election under the Rikken Kokumintō party, and was subsequently reelected 13 times, holding the seat until World War II. A supporter of the reforms of Inukai Tsuyoshi, he later changed party affiliations to the Rikken Seiyūkai.

Uehara served as parliamentary councilor for the Ministry of Communications in 1924 under Prime Minister Katō Takaaki, and parliamentary councilor for the Ministry of Foreign Affairs in 1926 under Prime Minister Tanaka Giichi. In 1932–1936, Uehara was the vice-chair of the House of Representatives. In the 1939 schism of the Rikken Seiyuto, Uehara sided with the "orthodox" faction led by Ichirō Hatoyama.

Uehara took a critical stance against the formation of the Taisei Yokusankai, and in 1941 formed an anti-Yokusankai group with Hatoyama and Yukio Ozaki; however, the group was defeated in the 1942 General Election. During the war years, he worked in the budgetary committee of the Ministry of Foreign Affairs under Shigenori Tōgō and was noted for his anti-war stance, repeated stating that it was the job of the ministry to bring the war to an early conclusion.

After the end of World War II, Uehara helped form the Japan Liberal Party 1942–1948 together with Hatoyama and Hitoshi Ashida. In the first Yoshida administration he was appointed Minister without portfolio and subsequently Home Minister. Despite his liberal credentials, he was highly opposed to Article 9 of the new Constitution of Japan, which he felt to be incompatible with a sovereign nation.

In 1955, Uehara served as chairman of the Committee of Foreign Affairs for the House of Representatives.

== Awards and recognition ==
勲一等旭日大綬章 Grand Cordon of the Order of Rising Sun.

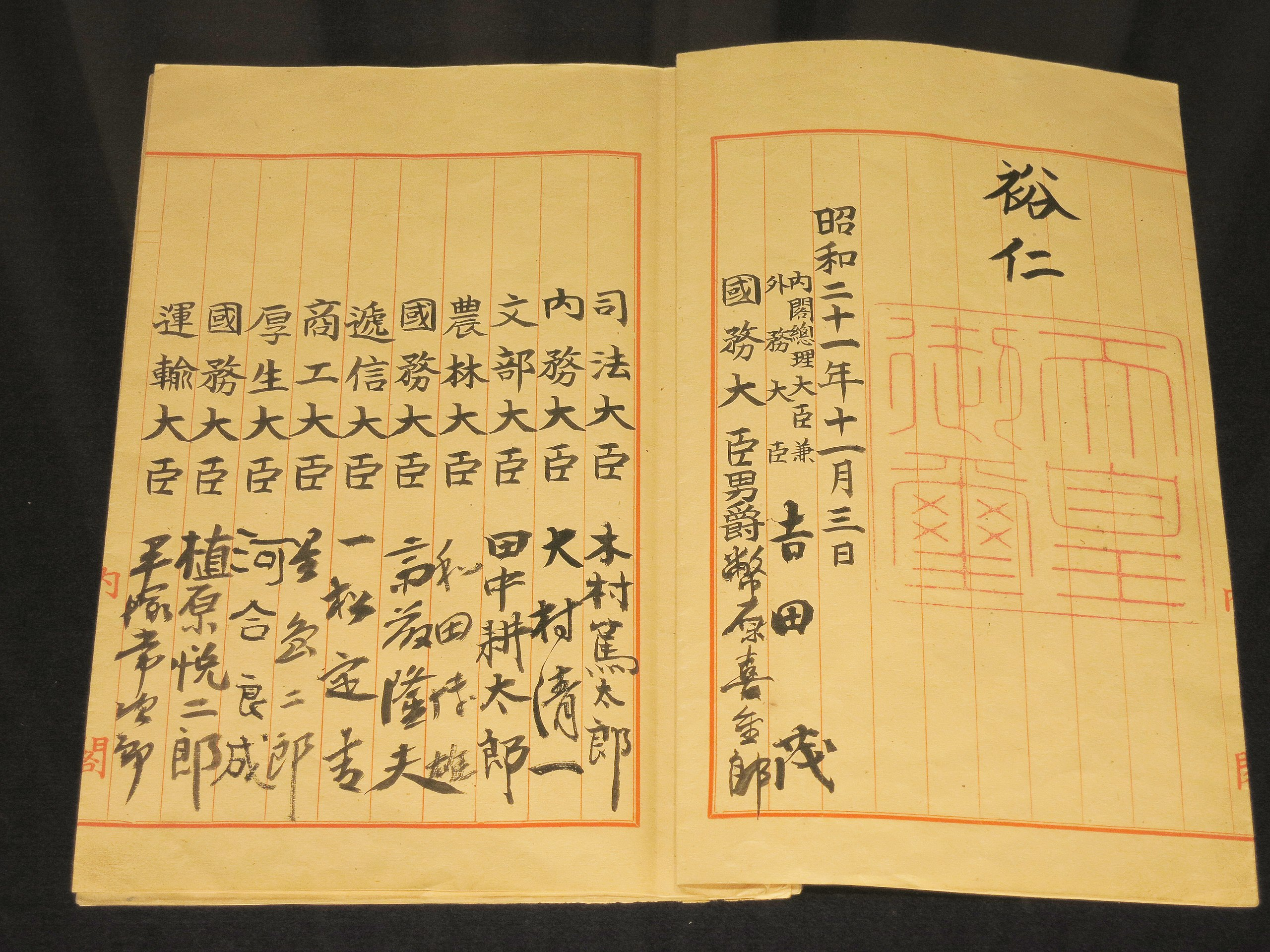
Signature on Proclamation for Constitution of Japan (1947), Etsujirō Uehara's signature is the second from the left

House of Representatives (Japan)
Preceded by Giichi Masuda	Vice-Speaker of the House of Representatives; 1932–1936	Succeeded by Tadahiko Okada
Preceded by Eikichi Kanbayashiyama	Chairman of the Committee on Budget; 1949–1950	Succeeded by Zentaro Kosaka
Preceded by Soichiro Kita	Chairman of the Committee on Foreign Affairs; 1955	Succeeded by Shigesaburō Maeo
Political offices
Preceded by Seiichi Ōmura	Minister of Home Affairs; 1947	Succeeded by Kozaemon Kimura
