= Kenji Tomita =

Japanese politician (1897–1977)

- 富田 健治
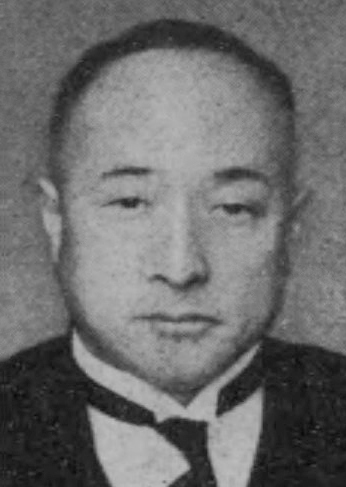
- Tomita in 1943

Chief Cabinet Secretary
- In office 22 July 1940 – 18 October 1941
- Prime Minister: Fumimaro Konoe
- Preceded by: Sōtarō Ishiwata
- Succeeded by: Naoki Hoshino

Member of the House of Representatives
- In office 22 May 1958 – 23 October 1963
- Preceded by: Fusanosuke Maeda
- Succeeded by: Eiji Yamashita
- Constituency: Hyōgo 2nd
- In office 1 October 1952 – 24 January 1955
- Preceded by: Gashirō Shiota
- Succeeded by: Fusanosuke Maeda
- Constituency: Hyōgo 2nd

Member of the House of Peers
- In office 16 October 1941 – 25 May 1946 Nominated by the Emperor

Governor of Nagano Prefecture
- In office 23 December 1938 – 22 July 1940
- Monarch: Hirohito
- Preceded by: Seiichi Ōmura
- Succeeded by: Minoru Suzuki

Personal details
- Born: 1 November 1897 Kobe, Hyōgo, Japan
- Died: 23 March 1977 (aged 79)
- Party: Liberal Democratic
- Other political affiliations: Independent (1938–1953); Liberal (1953–1955)
- Education: Kyoto Imperial University

Kenji Tomita (富田健治, 1 November 1897 – 23 March 1977) was a Japanese politician. He was born in Kobe. He graduated from Kyoto University. He was governor of Nagano Prefecture (1938–1940), served as Cabinet Secretary under Fumimaro Konoe, and was elected to the House of Representatives in 1952. He was a recipient of the Order of the Sacred Treasure.

Tomita was a keen martial artist, studying judo and aikido. He used his influence to protect aikido's founder Morihei Ueshiba from arrest during the Second Oomoto Incident in 1935 and was the first chairman of the Aikikai.

Preceded by Seiichi Ōmura	Governor of Nagano; 1938–1940	Succeeded by Minoru Suzuki
