= Isamu Sonoyama =

Japanese politician (1848–1921)

- 園山 勇
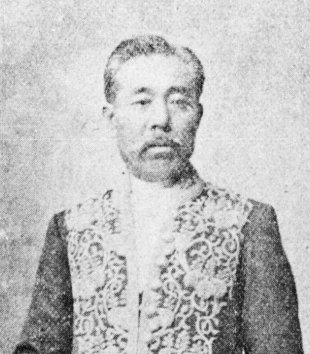
- Sonoyama in 1902

Member of the House of Representatives
- In office 15 May 1908 – 14 May 1912
- Preceded by: Chiyojirō Esumi
- Succeeded by: Multi-member district
- Constituency: Shimane Counties
- In office 10 August 1902 – 28 December 1902
- Preceded by: Constituency established
- Succeeded by: Hiromu Sakisaka
- Constituency: Shimane Counties
- In office 1 March 1894 – 10 June 1898
- Preceded by: Unbe Okazaki
- Succeeded by: Hoshino Jin'uemon
- Constituency: Shimane 1st

Governor of Miyazaki Prefecture
- In office 8 August 1899 – 8 February 1902
- Monarch: Meiji
- Preceded by: Kabayama Sukeo
- Succeeded by: Iwao Saburō

Governor of Nagano Prefecture
- In office 16 July 1898 – 8 August 1899
- Monarch: Meiji
- Preceded by: Kan'ichi Gondo
- Succeeded by: Norikichi Oshikawa

Personal details
- Born: 6 April 1848 Matsue Domain, Japan
- Died: 14 August 1921 (aged 73)
- Party: Rikken Seiyūkai
- Other political affiliations: Liberal (1894–1898)

Isamu Sonoyama (園山 勇, Sonoyama Isamu; April 6, 1848 – August 14, 1921) was a Japanese politician. He was born in Shimane Prefecture. He served in the House of Representatives of the Empire of Japan. He was governor of Nagano Prefecture (1898–1899) and Miyazaki Prefecture (1899–1902).

Preceded by Kan'ichi Gondo	Governor of Nagano Prefecture; 1898–1899	Succeeded by Sokkichi Oshikawa
Preceded by Sukeo Kabayama	Governor of Miyazaki Prefecture; 1899–1902	Succeeded by Saburo Iwao
