= Seiichi Ōmura =

Japanese politician

Ōmura Seiichi
- 大村 清一
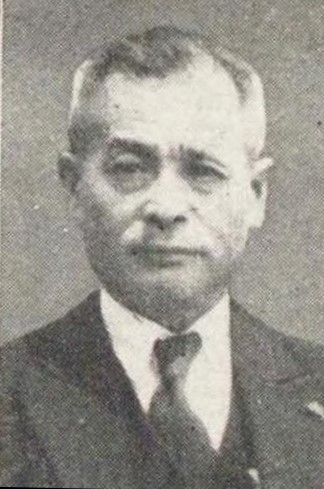

Director-General of the Japan Defense Agency
- In office 10 December 1954 – 19 March 1955
- Prime Minister: Ichirō Hatoyama
- Preceded by: Tokutarō Kimura
- Succeeded by: Arata Sugihara

Minister of Home Affairs
- In office 22 May 1946 – 24 May 1947
- Prime Minister: Shigeru Yoshida
- Preceded by: Chūzō Mitsuchi
- Succeeded by: Etsujirō Uehara

Member of the House of Representatives
- In office 21 November 1960 – 23 October 1963
- Preceded by: Kōichi Kameyama
- Succeeded by: Kōichi Kameyama
- Constituency: Okayama 1st
- In office 25 April 1947 – 25 April 1958
- Preceded by: Constituency established
- Succeeded by: Kuroda Hisao
- Constituency: Okayama 1st

Member of the House of Peers
- In office 8 June 1946 – 2 May 1947 Nominated by the Emperor
Gubernatorial offices
Governor of Kanagawa Prefecture
In office 23 December 1938 – 4 September 1939
| Monarch | Hirohito |
| Preceded by | Kiyoshi Nakarai |
| Succeeded by | Ichisho Inuma |
Governor of Nagano Prefecture
In office 11 January 1938 – 23 December 1938
| Monarch | Hirohito |
| Preceded by | Shunsuke Kondo |
| Succeeded by | Kenji Tomita |
In office 15 January 1935 – 13 March 1936
| Monarch | Hirohito |
| Preceded by | Shōzō Okada |
| Succeeded by | Shunsuke Kondo |

Personal details
- Born: 4 May 1892 Tsuyama, Okayama, Japan
- Died: 24 May 1968 (aged 76)
- Party: Liberal Democratic
- Other political affiliations: Independent (before 1947); JLP (1947–1948); DLP (1948–1950); LP (1950–1954); JDP (1954–1955)
- Children: Jōji Ōmura
- Education: Kyoto Imperial University

Seiichi Ōmura (大村 清一, Ōmura Seiichi; 4 May 1892 – 24 May 1968) was a politician and bureaucrat in the early Shōwa period Japan, who subsequently was a politician and cabinet minister in the immediate post-war era.

== Biography ==
Ōmura was born in Tsuyama, Okayama. After his graduation from the Law School of Kyoto Imperial University, he entered the Home Ministry. He served as Governor of Nagano Prefecture from 15 January 1935 to 13 March 1936, and again for a second term from 11 January 1938 to 23 December 1938. He was then appointed Governor of Kanagawa Prefecture from 23 December 1938 to 4 September 1939. Later in 1939, he was Vice Minister for Education under Prime Minister Abe Nobuyuki. In 1943, he was made chairman of the Japan Student Services Organization.

After the end of World War II, during the American occupation of Japan, Ōmura served as Home Minister in the first Yoshida administration from 22 May 1946 to 24 May 1947. He was also appointed to a seat in the House of Peers in the Diet of Japan.

From 10 December 1954 to 19 March 1955, Ōmura served as Director-General for the Japan Defense Agency under the first Hatoyama administration.

Ōmura subsequently was elected a seat in the Lower House of the Diet from his native Okayama, and served for six terms from 21 November 1960 to 23 October 1963. He was awarded the Grand Cordon of the Order of the Sacred Treasure on 29 April 1965.

Political offices
| Preceded by Chūzō Mitsuji | Home Minister; 22 April 1946 – 31 January 1947 | Succeeded by Etsujirō Uehara |
