= Shōzō Okada =

Japanese lawyer

- 岡田 周造
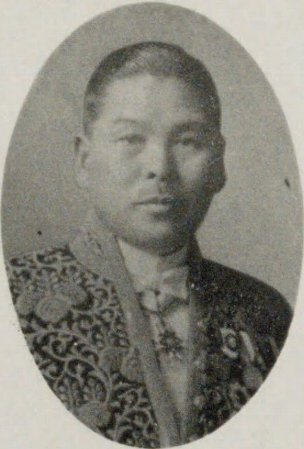

Governor of Tokyo
- In office 24 June 1938 – 7 January 1941
- Monarch: Hirohito
- Preceded by: Tetsuji Tachi
- Succeeded by: Jitsuzō Kawanishi
Additional positions
Governor of Hyōgo Prefecture
In office 13 March 1936 – 24 June 1938
Monarch	Hirohito
Preceded by	Michio Yuzawa
Succeeded by	Ennosuke Sekiya
Governor of Nagano Prefecture
In office 4 August 1933 – 15 January 1935
Monarch	Hirohito
Preceded by	Kuraji Ishigaki
Succeeded by	Seiichi Ōmura
Governor of Yamaguchi Prefecture
In office 18 December 1931 – 4 August 1933
Monarch	Hirohito
Preceded by	Hirai Mitsuo
Succeeded by	Yoshio Kikuyama
Governor of Chiba Prefecture
In office 9 November 1931 – 8 December 1931
Monarch	Hirohito
Preceded by	Hotta Kanae
Succeeded by	Tomejirō Ōkubo

Personal details
- Born: 8 November 1886
- Died: 31 May 1983 (aged 96)
- Education: Tokyo Imperial University

Shōzō Okada (岡田周造, Okada Shozo, 8 November 1886 – 31 May 1983) was a Japanese politician. He was born in Tochigi Prefecture. He was a graduate of Tokyo Imperial University. He was a governor of Chiba Prefecture (1931), Yamaguchi Prefecture (1931–1933), Nagano Prefecture (1933–1935), Hyōgo Prefecture (1936–1938) and Tokyo (1938–1941).

Preceded by	Governor of Chiba Prefecture; 1931	Succeeded by
Preceded by	Governor of Yamaguchi Prefecture; 1931–1933	Succeeded by
Preceded by Kuraji Ishigaki	Governor of Nagano; 1933–1935	Succeeded by Seiichi Ōmura
Preceded by	Governor of Hyōgo Prefecture; 1936–1938	Succeeded by
Preceded by Tetsuji Kan	Governor of Tokyo; 1938–1941	Succeeded by Jitsuzo Kawanishi
