= Kuraji Ishigaki =

Japanese politician

- 石垣 倉治
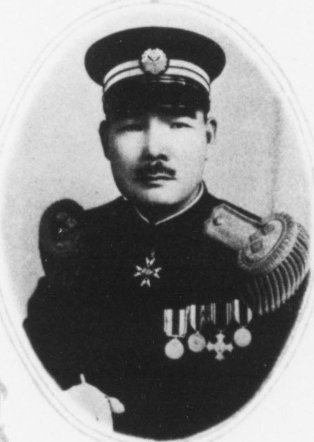

Mayor of Nagano
- In office 20 October 1941 – 7 April 1942
- Preceded by: Tadae Takano
- Succeeded by: Tadae Takano

Governor of Nagano Prefecture
- In office 28 August 1931 – 4 August 1933
- Monarch: Hirohito
- Preceded by: Shintarō Suzuki
- Succeeded by: Shōzō Okada

Personal details
- Born: 16 July 1880 Kitamurayama, Yamagata, Japan
- Died: 7 April 1942 (aged 61)
- Education: Tokyo Imperial University

Kuraji Ishigaki (石垣 倉治, Ishigaki Kuraji; 16 July 1880 – 7 April 1942) was a Japanese politician. He was born in Yamagata Prefecture. He was governor of Nagano Prefecture (1931–1933) and mayor of Nagano, Nagano (October 1941–April 1942). He was a member of the Government-General of Taiwan. He died in office.

== Bibliography ==
- Successive governor編纂会編『新編Japanのsuccessive governor』successive governor編纂会、1991.
- Ikuhiko Hata編『Comprehensive Encyclopedia of the Japanese Bureaucracy：1868 - 2000』University of Tokyo Press、2001.
- Nagano Prefecture姓氏歴史人物大辞典編纂委員会編著『Nagano Prefecture姓氏歴史人物大辞典』角川Japan姓氏歴史人物大辞典30、角川書店、1996.

Preceded by Shintarō Suzuki	Governors of Nagano; 1931–1933	Succeeded by Shōzō Okada
Preceded by	Mayor of Nagano; 1941–1942	Succeeded by
