= Yukiharu Miki =

Japanese physician and politician

- 三木 行治

Governor of Okayama Prefecture
- In office 1 May 1951 – 21 September 1964
- Monarch: Hirohito
- Preceded by: Hirokichi Nishioka
- Succeeded by: Takenori Katō

Personal details
- Born: 1 May 1903 Kita-ku, Okayama, Japan
- Died: 21 September 1964 (aged 61)
- Education: Kyushu Imperial University
- Occupation: Physician and politician
- Awards: Ramon Magsaysay Award (1964)

Yukiharu Miki (三木 行治, Miki Yukiharu; 1 May 1903 – 21 September 1964) was a Japanese physician and politician. He served as Governor for the Okayama Prefecture from 3 May 1951 until his death on 21 September 1964. During his period as governor, the prefecture went through considerable modernisation, becoming an important industrial district.

Yukiharu Miki was awarded the 1964 Ramon Magsaysay Award for Government Service.
