= Tsunamasa Ōyama =

Japanese politician

- 大山 綱昌
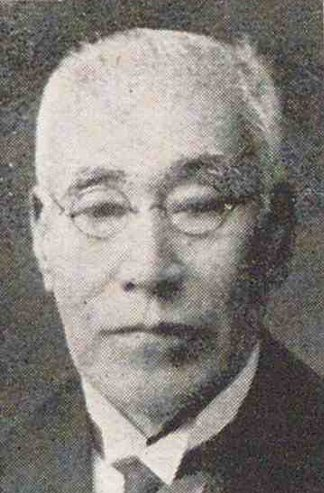

Member of the House of Peers
- In office 27 January 1919 – 18 October 1934 Nominated by the Emperor
Gubernatorial offices
Governor of Okayama Prefecture
In office 4 July 1911 – 1 June 1913
Monarchs	Meiji; Taishō
Preceded by	Taniguchi Tomegoro
Succeeded by	Yuasa Kurahei
Governor of Nagano Prefecture
In office 11 September 1905 – 4 July 1911
Monarch	Meiji
Preceded by	Kiyohide Seki
Succeeded by	Teikan Chiba
Governor of Yamanashi Prefecture
In office 27 February 1903 – 11 September 1905
Monarch	Meiji
Preceded by	Kenzō Ishihara
Succeeded by	Chiyosaburō Takeda
Governor of Saga Prefecture
In office 12 August 1896 – 7 April 1897
Monarch	Meiji
Preceded by	Tanabe Teruzane
Succeeded by	Takeuchi Iseki

Personal details
- Born: 24 December 1853 Kagoshima, Satsuma, Japan
- Died: 18 October 1934 (aged 80)

Tsunamasa Ōyama (大山 綱昌, Ōyama Tsunamasa; 24 December 1853 – 18 October 1934) was a Japanese politician. He was governor of Saga Prefecture (1898–1901), Gunma Prefecture (1901–1902) and Nagano Prefecture (1902–1905).

== Awards ==
- 1907 – Order of the Rising Sun

Preceded by	Governor of Saga Prefecture; 1896–1897	Succeeded by
Preceded by	Governor of Yamanashi Prefecture; 1903–1905	Succeeded by
Preceded by Kiyohide Seki	Governor of Nagano; 1905–1911	Succeeded by
Preceded by Taniguchi Tomegoro	Governor of Okayama Prefecture; 1911–1913	Succeeded by
