= Mitsusada Umetani =

Japanese government official

- 梅谷 光貞
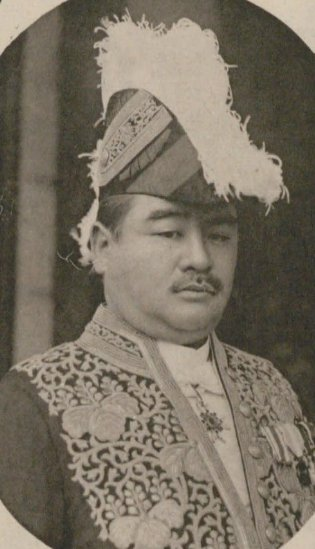
- A photograph of Mitsusada Umetani

Governor of Nagano Prefecture
- In office 24 June 1924 – 5 August 1926
- Monarch: Taishō
- Preceded by: Toshio Honma
- Succeeded by: Morio Takahashi

Governor of Yamanashi Prefecture
- In office 25 October 1923 – 24 June 1924
- Monarch: Taishō
- Preceded by: Shigeyoshi Omihara
- Succeeded by: Toshio Honma

Governor of Shinchiku Prefecture
- In office 15 May 1922 – 25 October 1923
- Monarch: Taishō
- Preceded by: Tokuju Tsuneyoshi
- Succeeded by: Susumu Satō

Personal details
- Born: 2 December 1880 Yabu, Hyōgo, Japan
- Died: 27 September 1936 (aged 55)
- Education: Tokyo Imperial University

Mitsusada Umetani (2 December 1880 – 27 September 1936) was a Japanese Home Ministry and Police Bureau government official. He was born in Hyōgo Prefecture. He was a graduate of the University of Tokyo. He was governor of Yamanashi Prefecture (1923–1924) and Nagano Prefecture (1924–1926).

Preceded by	Governor of Yamanashi Prefecture; 1923–1924	Succeeded by Toshio Honma
Preceded by Toshio Honma	Governor of Nagano; 1924–1926	Succeeded by Morio Takahashi
