= Teikan Chiba =

Japanese prosecutor, judge and politician

- 千葉 貞幹

Governor of Nagano Prefecture
- In office 4 July 1911 – 27 March 1913
- Monarchs: Meiji; Taishō
- Preceded by: Tsunamasa Ōyama
- Succeeded by: Ichiro Yoda

Governor of Ōita Prefecture
- In office 28 July 1906 – 4 July 1911
- Monarch: Meiji
- Preceded by: Ogura Hisashi
- Succeeded by: Akira Sakaya

Personal details
- Born: 29 February 1852
- Died: 26 March 1913 (aged 61)
- Resting place: Zōshigaya Cemetery

Teikan Chiba (千葉 貞幹, Chiba Teikan; 29 February 1852 – 26 March 1913) was a Japanese prosecutor, judge and politician. He was born in Nara Prefecture. He was governor of Ōita Prefecture (1906–1911) and Nagano Prefecture (1911–1913). He was a recipient of the Order of the Sacred Treasure.

== Bibliography ==
- 歴代知事編纂会編『新編日本の歴代知事』歴代知事編纂会、1991年。
- 内閣「長野県知事正四位勲二等千葉貞幹」大正2年、アジア歴史資料センター レファレンスコード: A10112762300

Preceded by	Governor of Ōita Prefecture; 1906-1911	Succeeded by
Preceded by Tsunamasa Ōyama	Governor of Nagano; 1911-1913	Succeeded by Ichiro Yoda
