= Kiyohide Seki =

Japanese politician

- 関 清英
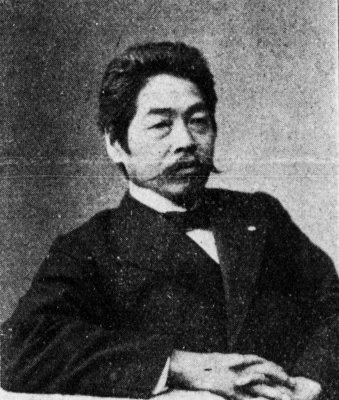

Member of the House of Peers
- In office 7 January 1906 – 22 January 1927 Nominated by the Emperor

Superintendent General of the Tokyo Metropolitan Police Department
- In office 10 September 1905 – 17 January 1906
- Preceded by: Tsunayuki Adachi
- Succeeded by: Kanemichi Anraku

Member of the House of Representatives
- In office 10 August 1902 – 28 December 1902
- Preceded by: Constituency established
- Succeeded by: Kanematsu Hiroshi
- Constituency: Saga Counties
Gubernatorial offices
Governor of Nagano Prefecture
In office 8 February 1902 – 10 September 1905
Monarch	Meiji
Preceded by	Norikichi Oshikawa
Succeeded by	Tsunamasa Ōyama
Governor of Gunma Prefecture
In office 2 April 1901 – 8 February 1902
Monarch	Meiji
Preceded by	Ogura Nobuchika
Succeeded by	Suzuki Sadanao
Governor of Saga Prefecture
In office 21 December 1898 – 2 April 1901
Monarch	Meiji
Preceded by	Takeuchi Iseki
Succeeded by	Kagawa Teru

Personal details
- Born: 6 June 1851
- Died: 22 January 1927 (aged 75)
- Resting place: Zōshigaya Cemetery

Kiyohide Seki (関 清英, Seki Kiyohide; 6 June 1851 – 22 January 1927) was a Japanese politician. He was governor of Saga Prefecture (1898–1901), Gunma Prefecture (1901–1902) and Nagano Prefecture (1902–1905).

== Awards ==
- 1907 – Order of the Rising Sun

Preceded by	Governor of Saga; 1898–1901	Succeeded by
Preceded by Ogura Nobuchika	Governor of Gunma; 1901–1902	Succeeded by Sada Suzuki
Preceded by	Governor of Nagano; 1902–1905	Succeeded by Tsunamasa Ōyama
