= Asada Tokunori =

Japanese diplomat

- 浅田 徳則
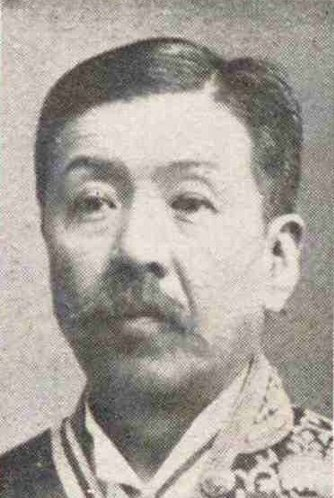

Member of the House of Peers
- In office 23 September 1903 – 30 March 1933 Nominated by the Emperor
Gubernatorial offices
Governor of Kanagawa Prefecture
In office 14 May 1898 – 16 June 1900
Monarch	Meiji
Preceded by	Kenmei Nakano
Succeeded by	Sufu Kōhei
In office 26 December 1889 – 9 April 1891
Monarch	Meiji
Preceded by	Morikata Oki
Succeeded by	Utsumi Tadakatsu
Governor of Hiroshima Prefecture
In office 7 April 1897 – 14 May 1898
Monarch	Meiji
Preceded by	Orita Heinai
Succeeded by	Takatoshi Iwamura
Governor of Niigata Prefecture
In office 6 February 1896 – 7 April 1897
Monarch	Meiji
Preceded by	Koteda Yasusada
Succeeded by	Minoru Katsumata
Governor of Nagano Prefecture
In office 9 April 1891 – 6 February 1896
Monarch	Meiji
Preceded by	Utsumi Tadakatsu
Succeeded by	Chikaaki Takasaki

Personal details
- Born: 21 November 1848 Kyoto, Yamashiro, Japan
- Died: 30 March 1933 (aged 84)
- Resting place: Tama Cemetery

Asada Tokunori (Japanese: 浅田徳則; 21 November 1848 – 30 March 1933) was a Japanese politician from the Meiji era. He served as governor of Hiroshima Prefecture in 1897–1898 and 1898–1903, governor of Kanagawa Prefecture (1889–1891, 1898–1900), Nagano (1891–1896) and Niigata Prefecture (1896–1897). He also served as the director of the Public Communications Bureau in the Foreign Ministry under Foreign Minister Inoue Kaoru.
