= Nagayasu =

- Gender: Male

Origin
- Origin: Japanese
- Meaning: Different meanings depending on the kanji used

Nagayasu (written: 長康 or 長泰) is a masculine Japanese given name. Notable people with the name include:

- Hirano Nagayasu (平野 長泰; 1559–1628), Japanese samurai
- Nagayasu Honda (本田 長康), Japanese footballer
- Maeno Nagayasu (前野 長康; 1528–1595), Japanese samurai
- Ōkubo Nagayasu (大久保 長安; 1545–1613), Japanese samurai and daimyō

Nagayasu (written: 長安 or 永安) is also a Japanese surname. Notable people with the surname include:

- Hakuji Nagayasu (永安 百治; 1895–1943), Japanese politician
- Takashi Nagayasu (長安 豊; born 1968), Japanese politician
