= Chikaaki Takasaki =

Japanese politician

- 高崎 親章
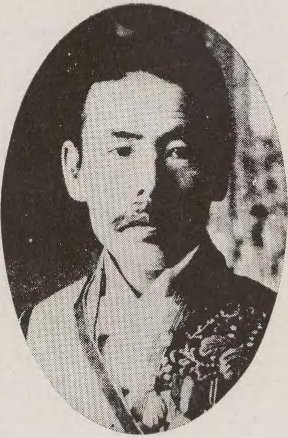

Member of the House of Peers
- In office 15 July 1903 – 27 December 1920 Nominated by the Emperor
Gubernatorial offices
Governor of Osaka Prefecture
In office 8 February 1902 – 4 September 1911
Monarch	Meiji
Preceded by	Kikuchi Kanji
Succeeded by	Katsutarō Inuzuka
Governor of Kyoto Prefecture
In office March 1900 – February 1902
Monarch	Meiji
Preceded by	Utsumi Tadakatsu
Succeeded by	Shōichi Ōmori
Governor of Miyagi Prefecture
In office 19 January 1900 – 19 March 1900
Monarch	Meiji
Preceded by	Chikami Kiyoomi
Succeeded by	Nomura Masaaki
Governor of Okayama Prefecture
In office 7 July 1897 – 19 January 1900
Monarch	Meiji
Preceded by	Kōno Chūzō
Succeeded by	Yoshihara Saburō
Governor of Nagano Prefecture
In office 6 February 1896 – 7 April 1897
Monarch	Meiji
Preceded by	Asada Tokunori
Succeeded by	Kan'ichi Gondo
Governor of Ibaraki Prefecture
In office 10 March 1893 – 6 February 1896
Monarch	Meiji
Preceded by	Makino Nobuaki
Succeeded by	Egi Kazuyuki

Personal details
- Born: 7 June 1853 Hioki, Satsuma, Japan
- Died: 27 December 1920 (aged 67)

Chikaaki Takasaki (高崎 親章, Takasaki Chikaaki; 7 June 1853 – 27 December 1920) was a Japanese politician. He fought in the Satsuma Rebellion of 1877. He was governor of Ibaraki Prefecture (1893–1896), Nagano Prefecture (1896–1897), Okayama Prefecture (1897–1900), Miyagi Prefecture (1900), Kyoto Prefecture (1900–1902) and Osaka (1902–1911).

== Awards ==
- 1894 – Order of the Sacred Treasure
- 1903 – Order of the Rising Sun
- 1907 – Order of the Rising Sun
- 1908 – Military Medal of Honor (Japan)
- 1916 – Victory Medal (Japan)

Preceded by Makino Nobuaki	Governor of Ibaraki Prefecture; 1893–1896	Succeeded by Egi Kazuyuki
Preceded by Asada Tokunori	Governor of Nagano; 1896–1897	Succeeded by Kan'ichi Gondo
Preceded by Chuuzo Kohno	Governor of Okayama Prefecture; 1897–1900	Succeeded by Saburo Yoshihara
Preceded by Kiyoomi Chikami	Governor of Miyagi Prefecture; 1900	Succeeded by Masaaki Nomura
Preceded by Utsumi Tadakatsu	Governor of Kyoto; 1900–1902	Succeeded by Shouichi Ohmori
Preceded by Kanji Kikuchi	Governor of Osaka; 1902–1911	Succeeded by Katsutaro Inuduka
