= Minoru Suzuki (Home ministry government official) =

Japanese politician

- 鈴木 登

Mayor of Kure
- In office 11 January 1942 – 10 January 1946
- Preceded by: Jinjiro Mizuno
- Succeeded by: Jinjiro Mizuno

Governor of Nagano Prefecture
- In office 24 July 1940 – 9 January 1942
- Monarch: Hirohito
- Preceded by: Kenji Tomita
- Succeeded by: Hakuji Nagayasu

Governor of Aomori Prefecture
- In office 1 March 1939 – 24 July 1940
- Monarch: Hirohito
- Preceded by: Masayoshi Ogawa
- Succeeded by: Ueda Seiichi

Personal details
- Born: 25 March 1893 Ogasa, Shizuoka, Japan
- Education: Tokyo Imperial University

Minoru Suzuki (鈴木 登, Suzuki Minoru; born 1893) was a Japanese politician. He was born in Shizuoka Prefecture. He graduated from Tokyo Imperial University. He was governor of Aomori Prefecture (1939–1940) and Nagano Prefecture (1940–1942). He was mayor of Kure, Hiroshima (1942–1946).

Preceded by	Governor of Aomori Prefecture; 1939-1940	Succeeded by
Preceded by Kenji Tomita	Governor of Nagano; 1940-1942	Succeeded by Hakuji Nagayasu
Preceded by	Mayor of Kure, Hiroshima; 1942-1946	Succeeded by

== Bibliography ==
- Nagano Prefecture 『Nagano Prefecture政史』
- 赤羽篤外編 『Nagano Prefecture歴史人物大事典』郷土出版社、1989.
