= Norikichi Oshikawa =

Japanese politician

- 押川 則吉
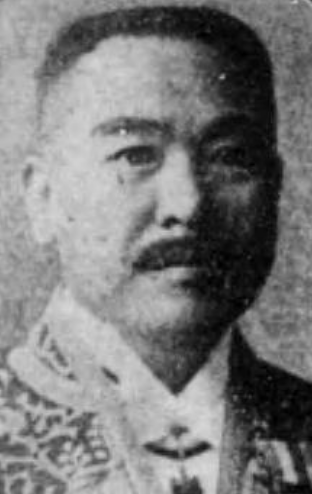

Member of the House of Peers
- In office 24 August 1911 – 18 February 1918 Nominated by the Emperor
Gubernatorial offices
Governor of Kumamoto Prefecture
In office 11 January 1907 – 20 July 1908
Monarch	Meiji
Preceded by	Egi Kazuyuki
Succeeded by	Kawaji Toshiatsu
Governor of Iwate Prefecture
In office 17 November 1904 – 12 January 1907
Monarch	Meiji
Preceded by	Mototoshi Kitajō
Succeeded by	Shin'ichi Kasai
Governor of Nagano Prefecture
In office 8 August 1899 – 8 February 1902
Monarch	Meiji
Preceded by	Isamu Sonoyama
Succeeded by	Kiyohide Seki
Governor of Ōita Prefecture
In office 25 June 1898 – 8 August 1899
Monarch	Meiji
Preceded by	Sugimoto Shigetō
Succeeded by	Suzuki Sadanao
Governor of Yamagata Prefecture
In office 29 December 1897 – 25 June 1898
Monarch	Meiji
Preceded by	Kurō Kikuchi
Succeeded by	Sone Shizuo

Personal details
- Born: 7 February 1863 Kagoshima, Satsuma, Japan
- Died: 18 February 1918 (aged 55) Tokyo, Japan
- Resting place: Aoyama Cemetery

Norikichi Oshikawa (押川 則吉, Oshikawa Norikichi; 7 February 1863 – 18 February 1918) was a Japanese politician. He was born in Kagoshima Prefecture. He was governor of Yamagata Prefecture (1897–1898), Ōita Prefecture (1898–1899), Nagano Prefecture (1899–1902), Iwate Prefecture (1904–1907) and Kumamoto Prefecture (1907–1908). He was a member of the Government-General of Taiwan. He was a recipient of the Order of the Rising Sun and the Order of the Sacred Treasure.

Preceded by Kikuchi Karasu	Governor of Yamagata Prefecture; 1897-1898	Succeeded by Sone Shizuo
Preceded by Shigetoo Sugimoto	Governor of Ōita Prefecture; 1898-1899	Succeeded by Sada Suzuki
Preceded by Isamu Sonoyama	Governor of Nagano; 1899-1902	Succeeded by Kiyohide Seki
Preceded by Ganri Hojo	Governor of Iwate Prefecture; 1904-1907	Succeeded by Shinichi Kasai
Preceded by Egi Kazuyuki	Governor of Kumamoto Prefecture; 1907-1908	Succeeded by Kawaji Toshikyo

== Bibliography ==
- 秦郁彦編『日本近現代人物履歴事典』東京大学出版会、2002年。
- 歴代知事編纂会編『新編日本の歴代知事』歴代知事編纂会、1991年。
- 衆議院・参議院編『議会制度百年史 - 貴族院・参議院議員名鑑』1990年。
