= List of Japanese films of 1974 =

A list of films released in Japan in 1974 (see 1974 in film).

Japanese films released in 1974
Title	Director	Cast	Genre	Notes
The 6 Ultra Brothers vs. the Monster Army	Shohei Tojo, Sompote Sands	Ko Kaeoduendee; Yodchay Meksuwan		
Abayo Dachi Kō				
Akumei–Nawabari arashi	Yasuzo Masumura	Shintaro Katsu, Kinya Kitaoji, Kiwako Taichi	—N/a	
Akumyō: Shima Arashiaka				
Aoba shigereru	Kihachi Okamoto	Masao Kusakari, Kumiko Akiyoshi, Yoshitaka Tanba	—N/a	
Ali the Man: Ali, the Fighter	Rick Baxter, William Greaves	Muhammad Ali	Documentary	Japanese-American co-production
Arupusu no shojo haiji–Mou hitori no kazoku	Isao Takahata			Animated short
Battles Without Honor and Humanity: Police Tactics	Kinji Fukasaku	Bunta Sugawara, Tatsuo Umemiya, Toshio Kurosawa	—N/a	
Battles Without Honor and Humanity: Final Episode	Kinji Fukasaku	Bunta Sugawara, Kinya Kitaoji, Hiroki Matsukata	—N/a	
Bitterness of Youth	Tatsumi Kamiyo	Kenichi Hagiwara, Kaori Momoi, Fumi Dan	—N/a	
Castle of Sand	Yoshitarō Nomura			
Demon Spies	Takashi Tsuboshima	Masaomi Kondo, Keiko Aramaki, Ryunosuke Minegishi	Chambara, horror	
ESPY	Jun Fukuda	Hiroshi Fujioka, Kaoru Yumi, Masao Kusakari	Fantasy, thriller	
Evil of Dracula	Michio Yamamoto	Toshio Kurosawa, Kunie Tanaka, Mariko Mochizuki	—N/a	
The Family	Satsuo Yamamoto	Shin Saburi, Yumeji Tsukioka, Tatsuya Nakadai	—N/a	
Female Ninja Magic: 100 Trampled Flowers	Chūsei Sone	Junko Miyashita	Roman porno	
Flower and Snake	Masaru Konuma	Naomi Tani	—N/a	
Godzilla vs. Mechagodzilla	Jun Fukuda	Masaaki Daimon, Kazuya Aoyama, Reiko Tajima	—N/a	
Hanzo the Razor: Who's Got the Gold?	Yoshio Inoue	Shintaro Katsu, Kō Nishimura, Mako Midori	—N/a	
Haroo! Fingaa 5	Susumu Fukuhara	Finger 5	Documentary	Short film
Himiko	Masahiro Shinoda	Shima Iwashita	Drama	
The Homeless	Kōichi Saitō	Shintaro Katsu, Ken Takakura. Meiko Kaji	—N/a	
Isoge! Wakamono–Tomorrow Never Waits	Tsugunobu Kotani	Koji Kata, Masao Orimo, Toshiya Egi	—N/a	
Izu no odoriko	Katsumi Nishikawa	Momoe Yamaguchi, Tomokazu Miura, Hitoshi Nakayama	—N/a	
Kamen Rider X	—N/a	—N/a	—N/a	
Kamen Rider X: The Five Riders vs. King Dark	—N/a	—N/a	—N/a	
Kanda kawa	Masanobu Deme	Keiko Sekine, Masao Kursakari, Tokue Hanazawa	—N/a	
Karafuto 1945 Summer Hyosetsu no mon	Mitsuo Murayama		—N/a	
Kigeki Damashi no jingi	Jun Fukuda	Kei Tani, Shiro Kishibe, Jiro Sakagami	—N/a	
Koi wa midori no kaze no naka	Miyoharu Ieki	Yusuke Sato, Mieko Harada, Yoshiko Mita	—N/a	
Lady Snowblood: Love Song of Vengeance	Toshiya Fujita	Meiko Kaji, Yoshio Harada, Juzo Itami	—N/a	
Last Swordsman	Masanobu Deme	Shigeru Koyama, Jiro Kawaraski, Masao Kusakari	—N/a	
Lone Wolf and Cub: White Heaven in Hell	Yoshiyuki Kuroda	Tomisaburo Wakayama, Akihiro Tomikawa, Junko Hitomi	—N/a	
Lupin the Third: Strange Psychokinetic Strategy	Takashi Tsuboshima	Yuki Meguro, Kunie Tanaka, Shiro Ito	—N/a	
Moscow, My Love	Kenji Yoshida, Aleksandr Mitta	Komaki Kurihara, Oleg Vidov, Makoto Sato	—N/a	Japanese-Soviet co-production
Mr. Giants–The Eternal Number on the Player's Jersey	Kauzo Kawabe	Shigeo Nagashima	Documentary	
New Battles Without Honor and Humanity				
Nyobo o hayajine saseru	Susumu Kodama	Yosuke Natsuki, Miyoko Akaza, Michiko Tsukasa	—N/a	
Pastoral: To Die in the Country	Shūji Terayama	Kantaro Suga	Drama	
Prophecies of Nostradamus	Toshio Masuda	Tetsuro Tamba, Kaoru Yumi, Toshio Kurosawsa	Fantasy	
Return of the Street Fighter	Shigehiro Ozawa	Sonny Chiba, Yoko Ichiji	Martial Arts	
Ryōma Ansatsu				
Samurai jyaiantsu–Sessho gawara no ketto	Tadao Nagahara		—N/a	Animated short
Sandakan No. 8	Kei Kumai	Komaki Kurihara, Kinuyo Tanaka, Yoko Takahashi	—N/a	
School of the Holy Beast	Norifumi Suzuki	Yumi Takigawa	—N/a	
Seishun no umi	Aihiko Okamoto	Daijiro Harada, Hidenari Aoki, Fujio Tokita	—N/a	
Shiawase	Hideo Onchi	Yuriko Sumi, Yusuke Okada, Nobuko Otowa	—N/a	
Shinzo ningen Kyashan–Fujimi no choseusha	Hiroshi Sasagawa		—N/a	Animated short
Sister Street Fighter	Kazuhiko Yamaguchi	Etsuko Shihomi, Sonny Chiba	Action	
Sister Street Fighter: Hanging by a Thread	—N/a	Yasuaki Kurata	Action	
The Street Fighter	Shigehiro Ozawa	Sonny Chiba, Gerald Yamada	Action	
Tomodachi				
Tora-san's Lovesick	Yoji Yamada	Kiyoshi Atsumi	Comedy	
Tora-san's Lullaby	Yoji Yamada	Kiyoshi Atsumi	Comedy	
Three Old Women	Noboru Nakamura	Aiko Mimasu, Kinuyo Tanaka, Michiyo Kogure	—N/a	
Urutoraman Taro–Chi o su hana wa shojo no sei	Eizo Yamagina	Saburo Shinoda, Takahiro Tono, Hidehiro Tsumura	—N/a	
Wife to be Sacrificed	Masaru Konuma	Naomi Tani	—N/a	
Yahu shisubeshi–Fukushu no mekanikku	Eizo Sudo	Hiroshi Fujioka, Mako Midori, Akemi Mari	—N/a	
The Year Without a Santa Claus	Jules Bass, Arthur Rankin Jr.	Shirley Booth, Mickey Rooney, Dick Shawn, George S. Irving	Animated	
Zao Zessho	Kunihiko Yammamoto	Yoko Takahashi, Akira Oda, Yoshitaka Tanba	—N/a	

== See also ==
- 1974 in Japan
- 1974 in Japanese television
