= Kan'ichi Gondo =

Japanese politician

- 権藤 貫一

Governor of Nagano Prefecture
- In office 7 April 1897 – 16 July 1898
- Monarch: Meiji
- Preceded by: Chikaaki Takasaki
- Succeeded by: Isamu Sonoyama

Member of the House of Representatives
- In office 1 September 1894 – 25 December 1897
- Preceded by: Tsuda Morihiko
- Succeeded by: Hiraoka Kōtarō
- Constituency: Fukuoka 1st
- In office 2 July 1890 – 25 December 1891
- Preceded by: Constituency established
- Succeeded by: Kōri Hosō
- Constituency: Fukuoka 3rd

Personal details
- Born: December 1845 Sawara, Chikuzen, Japan
- Died: 10 January 1915 (aged 69)
- Party: Kokumin Kyōkai
- Other political affiliations: Taiseikai (1890–1891)

Kan'ichi Gondo (権藤 貫一, Gondō Kan'ichi; December 1845 – 10 January 1915) was a Japanese politician. He was born in Fukuoka, Fukuoka. He was governor of Nagano Prefecture (1897–1898). He served in the House of Representatives of the Empire of Japan.

Preceded by Chikaaki Takasaki	Governor of Nagano Prefecture; 1897–1898	Succeeded by Isamu Sonoyama
