= Utsumi Tadakatsu =

Japanese politician

Junior Second Rank Baron Utsumi Tadakatsu
- 内海 忠勝
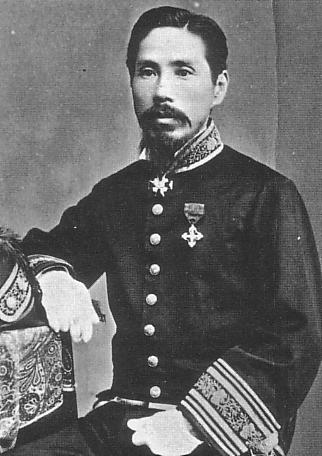
- Utsumi Tadakatsu wearing the 1872 Dajō-kan standard court uniform

Minister of Home Affairs
- In office 2 June 1901 – 15 July 1903
- Prime Minister: Katsura Tarō
- Preceded by: Suematsu Kenchō
- Succeeded by: Kodama Gentarō

President of the Board of Audit
- In office 19 March 1900 – 2 June 1901
- Preceded by: Yamada Nobumichi
- Succeeded by: Tajiri Inajirō

Member of the House of Peers
- In office 10 July 1904 – 20 January 1905 Nominated by the Emperor
- In office 29 November 1899 – 19 March 1900 Nominated by the Emperor
Gubernatorial offices
Governor of Kyoto Prefecture
In office November 1897 – March 1900
Monarch	Meiji
Preceded by	Yamada Nobumichi
Succeeded by	Chikaaki Takasaki
Governor of Osaka Prefecture
In office 10 October 1895 – 13 November 1897
Monarch	Meiji
Preceded by	Yamada Nobumichi
Succeeded by	Tokito Tamemoto
Governor of Kanagawa Prefecture
In office 9 April 1891 – 10 March 1893
Monarch	Meiji
Preceded by	Asada Tokunori
Succeeded by	Kenmei Nakano
Governor of Nagano Prefecture
In office 26 December 1889 – 9 April 1891
Monarch	Meiji
Preceded by	Kinashi Seiichirō
Succeeded by	Asada Tokunori
Governor of Hyōgo Prefecture
In office 18 April 1885 – 26 December 1889
Monarch	Meiji
Preceded by	Morioka Masazumi
Succeeded by	Hayashi Tadasu
Governor of Mie Prefecture
In office 10 July 1884 – 18 April 1885
Monarch	Meiji
Preceded by	Iwamura Sadataka
Succeeded by	Ishii Kunimichi
Governor of Nagasaki Prefecture
In office 11 October 1877 – 8 March 1883
Monarch	Meiji
Preceded by	Hidetomo Kitajima
Succeeded by	Ishida Eikichi

Personal details
- Born: 12 September 1843 Chōshū, Suō, Japan
- Died: 20 January 1905 (aged 61) Mita, Tokyo, Japan

Baron Utsumi Tadakatsu (内海 忠勝; 12 September 1843 – 20 January 1905) was a Japanese bureaucrat, statesman and cabinet minister, active in Meiji period Empire of Japan.

== Biography ==
Utsumi was born to a samurai family in Chōshū Domain, in what is now part of the city of Yamaguchi, Yamaguchi Prefecture). As a youth, he participated in the Kinmon Incident in Kyoto, where pro-sonnō Jōi Chōshū forces sought to seize control of the Emperor to overthrow the Tokugawa shogunate.

After the Meiji Restoration, he went to Tokyo and entered into service of the new Meiji government, and was selected as a member of the 1871 Iwakura Mission, visiting the United States, Great Britain and other European countries. After his return to Japan, he was appointed governor of Nagasaki Prefecture (1877–1883), Mie Prefecture (1884–1885), Hyōgo Prefecture (1885–1889), Nagano Prefecture (1889–1891), Kanagawa Prefecture (1891–1893), Osaka Prefecture (1895–1897), and Kyoto Prefecture (1897–1900). He then served as chairman of the Board of Audit from 1900 to 1901.

While Utsumi was Governor of Nagasaki, he hosted former United States President Ulysses S. Grant on his visit to Japan.

Utsumi was ennobled with the kazoku peerage title danshaku (baron) in 1887. He also served as a member of the House of Peers from its inception in 1890.

Utsumi was selected to become Home Minister in the cabinet of the 1st administration of Prime Minister Katsura Tarō in 1901.

Political offices
Preceded by Suematsu Kenchō	Home Minister; 2 June 1901 – 15 July 1903	Succeeded by Kodama Gentarō
Preceded by Nobumichi Yamada	Governor of Kyoto; November 1897 – March 1900	Succeeded by Chikaaki Takasaki
