= 1974 in Japanese television =

Events in 1974 in Japanese television.

== Debuts ==
Show	Station	Premiere Date	Genre	Original Run
Akai Meiro	TBS	October 4	drama	October 4, 1974 – March 28, 1975
Ai to Makoto	Tokyo Channel 12	October 4	drama	October 4, 1974 – March 28, 1975
Alps no Shōjo Heidi	Fuji TV	January 6	anime	January 6, 1974 – December 29, 1974
Calimero	NET	October 15	anime	October 15, 1974 – September 30, 1975
Chargeman Ken!	TBS	April 1	anime	April 1, 1974 – June 28, 1974
Chiisana Viking Bikke	Fuji TV	April 3	anime	April 3, 1974 – September 24, 1975
Dame Oyaji	Tokyo Channel 12	April 2	anime	April 2, 1974 – October 9, 1974
Dengeki!! Strada 5	NET	April 5	tokusatsu	April 5, 1974 – June 28, 1974
Denjin Zaborger	Fuji TV	April 6	tokusatsu	April 6, 1974 – June 29, 1975
FNS Music Festival	Fuji TV	July 2	music	July 2, 1974 – present
First Human Giatrus	TBS	October 5	anime	October 5, 1974 – March 27, 1976
Ganbare!! Robocon	NET	October 4	tokusatsu	October 4, 1974 – March 25, 1977
Getter Robo	Fuji TV	April 4	anime	April 4, 1974 – May 8, 1975
Great Mazinger	Fuji TV	September 8	anime	September 8, 1974 – September 28, 1975
Hurricane Polymar	NET	October 4	anime	October 4, 1974 – March 28, 1975
Hoshi no Ko Chobin	TBS	April 5	anime	April 5, 1974 – September 27, 1974
Ike! Ushiwaka Kotaro	Nippon TV	November 12	tokusatsu	November 12, 1974 – April 25, 1975
Inazuman Flash	NET	April 9	tokusatsu	April 9, 1974 – September 24, 1974
Kamen Rider Amazon	NET	October 19	tokusatsu	October 19, 1974 – March 29, 1975
Kamen Rider X	NET	February 16	tokusatsu	February 16, 1974 - October 12, 1974
Konchû Monogatari Shin Minashigo Hutch	NET	April 4	anime	April 4, 1974 – September 27, 1974
Majokko Megu-chan	NET	April 1	anime	April 1, 1974 - September 29, 1975
Space Battleship Yamato	Yomiuri TV	October 6	anime	October 6, 1974 – March 30, 1975
Sci-Fi Drama: Army of the Apes	TBS	October 6	tokusatsu	October 6, 1974 – March 30, 1975
Super Robot Mach Baron	Nippon TV	October 7	tokusatsu	October 7, 1974 – March 31, 1975
Ultraman Leo	TBS	April 12	tokusatsu	April 12, 1974 – March 28, 1975

== Ongoing ==
- Music Fair, music (1964–present)
- Mito Kōmon, jidaigeki (1969–2011)
- Sazae-san, anime (1969–present)
- Ōedo Sōsamō, jidaigeki (1970–1984)
- Ōoka Echizen, jidaigeki (1970–1999)
- Star Tanjō!, talent (1971–1983)

== Endings ==
Show	Station	Ending Date	Genre	Original Run
Alps no Shōjo Heidi	Fuji TV	December 29	anime	January 6, 1974 – December 29, 1974
Chargeman Ken!	TBS	June 28	anime	April 1, 1974 – June 28, 1974
Cutie Honey	NET	March 30	anime	October 13, 1973 – March 30, 1974
Dame Oyaji	Tokyo Channel 12	October 9	anime	April 2, 1974 – October 9, 1974
Dengeki!! Strada 5	NET	April 5	tokusatsu	April 5, 1974 – June 28, 1974
Dokonjō Gaeru	TBS	September 28	anime	October 7, 1972 – September 28, 1974
Hoshi no Ko Chobin	TBS	September 27	anime	April 5, 1974 – September 27, 1974
Ike! Greenman	Nippon TV	September 27	tokusatsu	November 12, 1973, to September 27, 1974
Inazuman	NET	March 26	tokusatsu	October 2, 1973 - March 26, 1974
Inazuman Flash	NET	September 24	tokusatsu	April 9, 1974, to September 24, 1974
Kamen Rider V3	NET	February 9	tokusatsu	February 17, 1973 – February 9, 1974
Kamen Rider X	NET	October 12	tokusatsu	February 16, 1974 - October 12, 1974
Kikaider 01	NET	March 30	tokusatsu	May 12, 1973 - March 30, 1974
Mazinger Z	Fuji TV	September 1	anime	December 3, 1972 – September 1, 1974
Neo-Human Casshern	Fuji TV	June 25	anime	October 2, 1973 – June 25, 1974
Konchû Monogatari Shin Minashigo Hutch	NET	September 27	anime	April 4, 1974 – September 27, 1974
Sasuga no Sarutobi	Fuji TV	March 11	anime	October 17, 1972 – March 11, 1974
Science Ninja Team Gatchaman	Fuji TV	September 29	anime	October 1, 1972 – September 29, 1974
Super Robot Red Baron	Nippon TV	March 27	tokusatsu	July 4, 1973 – March 27, 1974
Tetsujin Tiger Seven	Fuji TV	March 30	tokusatsu	October 6, 1973 - March 30, 1974
The Water Margin	Nippon TV	March 26	tokusatsu	October 2, 1973 - March 26, 1974
Ultraman Taro	TBS	April 6	tokusatsu	April 6, 1973 – April 5, 1974

== See also ==
- 1974 in anime
- 1974 in Japan
- List of Japanese films of 1974
