= Mishima Michitsune =

Japanese politician (1835–1888)

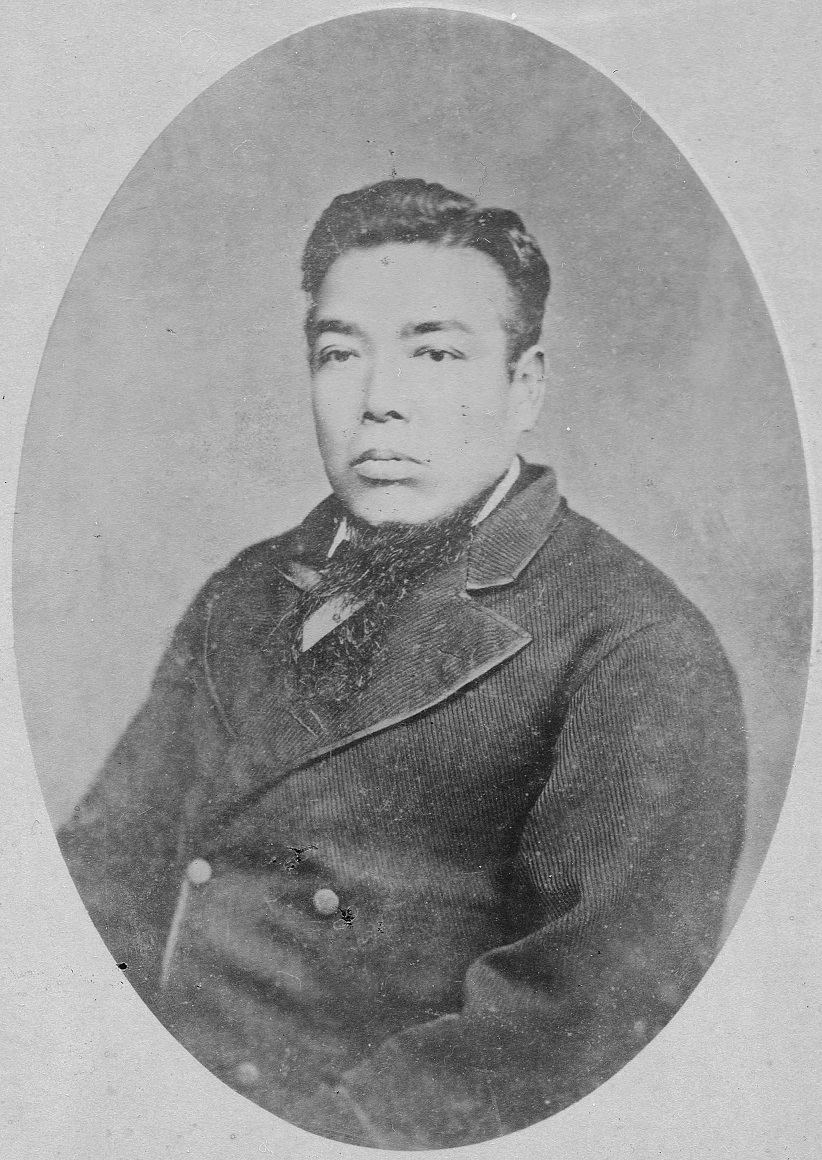
Viscount Mishima Michitsune

Viscount Mishima Michitsune (三島 通庸; 26 June 1835 – 23 October 1888) was a Japanese samurai of the Satsuma Domain during the Late Tokugawa shogunate. After the Meiji Restoration he served in the Home Ministry as a bureaucrat. He is also commonly known as Yahei or Yahée (弥兵衞 Yahee).

He had two sons, his first son Yatarō Mishima was governor of the Bank of Japan, while his second son Yahiko Mishima was a track and field athlete who competed in the 1912 Summer Olympics. His grandson Michiharu Mishima served as the fourth Chief Scout of the Scout Association of Japan. His second daughter Mineko was married to Ōkubo Toshimichi's second son Makino Nobuaki.

== Governor of Yamagata ==
In 1874, Mishima became the governor of Sakata Prefecture. The focus of this new post soon turned to countermeasures aimed at an agrarian-sector demonstration known as the Wappa Rebellion. This was a peasant protest opposed to a failure on the part of the former governor and government officials, who had come from being lords and vassals during the feudal era, to uphold a central edict and thereby imposing labour and taxes identical to those of the previous period. Mishima thus embarked on a full-scale reshuffling of all clerks and officials whilst simultaneously dealing with pressure from the agrarian sector. That following year the protests had been settled through the courts with the money returned to the farmers.

In August 1875, Sakata Prefecture became Uruoka Prefecture; the following year it became Yamagata Prefecture through the merging of Okitama (also Oitama) and Yamagata prefectures. Accordingly, Mishima became governor of both Uruoka and Yamagata prefectures. Mishima's central policy for Yamagata was the maintenance of roads and bridges and the building of public facilities.

During the Edo period, the Yamagata region formed a strong bond with Osaka, even more so than with Edo, due to shipping routes via the Sea of Japan and Mogami River. However, when land-based transportation was emphasised as an objective of the Meiji era government, traffic control on land routes were progressed so as to form ties with Tokyo. Firstly, allowance was made for the Kuriko Highway between Yonezawa and Fukushima, which was completed in 1880. Then, in 1882 the Sekiyama Highway between Yamagata and Sendai was completed. Both these routes were constructed to allow for vehicles (or, in those days, horse-carriages).

== Pressures faced in the public eye ==
In 1884, while he was serving as Governor of Tochigi, members of the Liberal Party plotted for Mishima's assassination in what became known as the Mount Kaban Incident. Even despite this there is still speculation as to whether any pressure from Mishima somehow proved to be an obstacle to any Freedom and People's Rights Movements.

On December 25, 1887, Mishima as Superintendent General brought to execution the Regulations for the Preservation of Law and Order declared publicly by imperial edict, which aimed to remove so-called "dangerous characters" from the imperial circles and opposed Freedom and People's Rights Movements such as the (三大事件建白運動 Sandai Jiken Kempaku Undō) and the United Front Movement. He was also the Superintendent General of the Metropolitan Police who brought to execution the Public Order & Police Law of 1900, the predecessor to the Peace Preservation Law of 1925.

It is speculated that with Prime Minister Itō Hirobumi's opposition to the Regulations for the Preservation of Law and Order and Home Minister Yamagata Aritomo's passive nature at this time, it was Mishima who actively promoted the Regulations for the Preservation of Law and Order. Resultant targets were figures such as Ozaki Yukio, Kataoka Kenkichi, Nakae Chōmin and Hoshi Tōru.

== Personal achievements ==
Mishima also displayed his enthusiasm for district developments outside the public office through the Chōkōsha firm in Nasunogahara, Tochigi (known today as Mishima Farms). He recruited his son Yatarō Mishima as managing director and fourteen of his closest subordinates to join the firm as shareholders, ensuring that land cultivation in the area would not succumb to monopolization.

Government offices
New title Prefecture established	Governor of Yamagata Prefecture; 1876–1882	Succeeded by Orita Heinai
Preceded by Yamayoshi Morisuke	Governor of Fukushima Prefecture; 1882–1884	Succeeded by Akashi Kinichi
Preceded by Fujikawa Tamechika	Governor of Tochigi Prefecture; 1883–1885	Succeeded by Kabayama Sukeo
Preceded by Ōsako Sadakiyo	Superintendent General of the Tokyo Metropolitan Police; 1885–1888	Succeeded by Orita Heinai
