= Orita Heinai =

Japanese politician

- 折田 平内
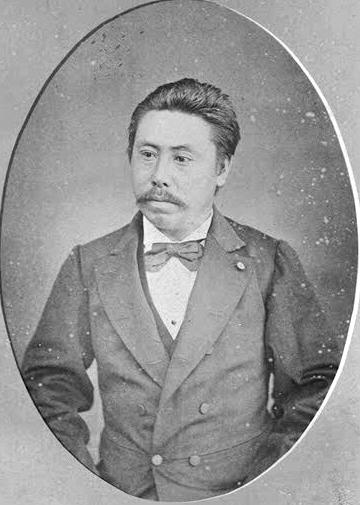
- Orita in 1880

Member of the House of Peers
- In office 23 January 1894 – 6 May 1905 Nominated by the Emperor
Gubernatorial offices
Governor of Shiga Prefecture
In office 7 April 1897 – 7 April 1899
Monarch	Meiji
Preceded by	Koteda Yasusada
Succeeded by	Atsushi Kawashima
Governor of Hiroshima Prefecture
In office 23 April 1896 – 7 April 1897
Monarch	Meiji
Preceded by	Nabeshima Miki
Succeeded by	Asada Tokunori
Governor of Tochigi Prefecture
In office 24 December 1889 – 20 January 1894
Monarch	Meiji
Preceded by	Kabayama Sukeo
Succeeded by	Satō Chō
Governor of Fukushima Prefecture
In office 19 July 1886 – 19 October 1888
Monarch	Meiji
Preceded by	Akashi Kinichi
Succeeded by	Yamada Nobumichi
Governor of Yamagata Prefecture
In office 13 July 1882 – 19 July 1886
Monarch	Meiji
Preceded by	Mishima Michitsune
Succeeded by	Shibahara Yawara

Personal details
- Born: 23 January 1847 Kagoshima, Satsuma, Japan
- Died: 6 May 1905 (aged 58)

Orita Heinai (23 January 1847 – 6 May 1905) was a Japanese politician who served as governor of Hiroshima Prefecture from April 1896 to April 1897. He was also governor of Yamagata Prefecture (1882–1883), Fukushima Prefecture (1883–1888), Tochigi Prefecture (1889–1894) and Shiga Prefecture (1897–1899).

Preceded by Nabeshima Miki	Governor of Hiroshima Prefecture; 1896–1897	Succeeded by Asada Tokunori
