= 1922 in Japanese football =

1922 season

Japanese football in 1922.

== Emperor's Cup ==
November 26, 1922

Nagoya Shukyu-Dan	1–0	Hiroshima Koto-shihan
? ?'

Toshima Shihan Ground

== Births ==
- July 18 - Ken Noritake
- August 9 - Taro Kagawa
