= Egi Kazuyuki =

Japanese bureaucrat and politician

Junior Second Rank Egi Kazuyuki
- 江木 千之
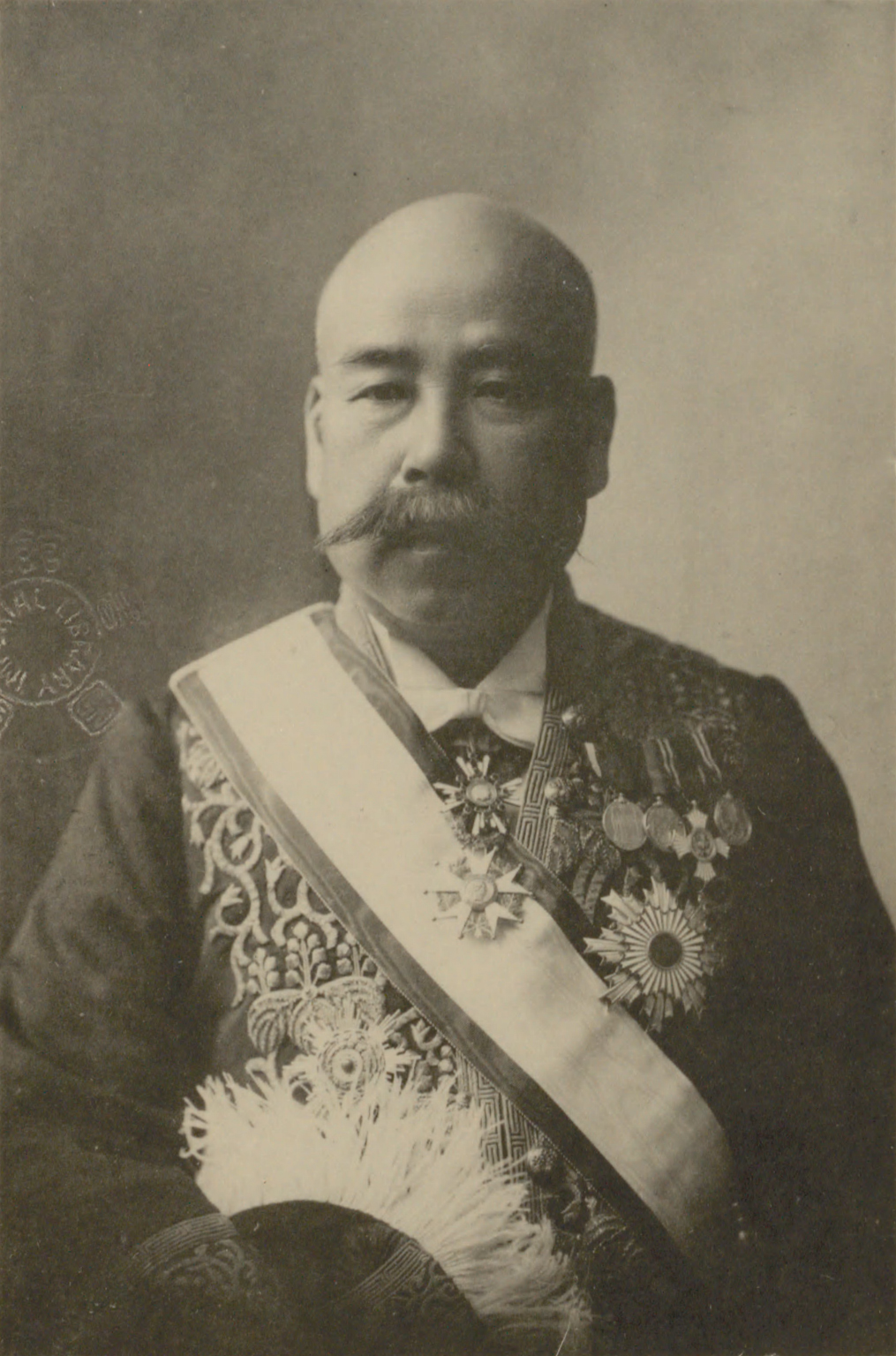

Minister of Education
- In office 7 January 1924 – 11 June 1924
- Prime Minister: Kiyoura Keigo
- Preceded by: Okano Keijirō
- Succeeded by: Ryōhei Ogada

Member of the Privy Council
- In office 28 June 1924 – 23 August 1932
- Monarchs: Taishō; Hirohito

Member of the House of Peers
- In office 22 August 1904 – 3 July 1924 Nominated by the Emperor
Gubernatorial offices
Governor of Kumamoto Prefecture
In office 29 June 1903 – 11 January 1907
Monarch	Meiji
Preceded by	Tokuhisa Tsunenori
Succeeded by	Norikichi Oshikawa
Governor of Hiroshima Prefecture
In office 28 December 1898 – 29 June 1903
Monarch	Meiji
Preceded by	Hattori Ichizo
Succeeded by	Tokuhisa Tsunenori
Governor of Aichi Prefecture
In office 13 November 1897 – 28 December 1898
Monarch	Meiji
Preceded by	Tokito Tamemoto
Succeeded by	Morikata Oki
Governor of Tochigi Prefecture
In office 7 April 1897 – 13 November 1897
Monarch	Meiji
Preceded by	Satō Chō
Succeeded by	Chikami Kiyoomi
Governor of Ibaraki Prefecture
In office 6 February 1896 – 7 April 1897
Monarch	Meiji
Preceded by	Chikaaki Takasaki
Succeeded by	Onoda Motohiro

Personal details
- Born: 21 May 1853 Iwakuni, Suō, Japan
- Died: 23 August 1932 (aged 79) Ushigome, Tokyo, Japan
- Education: Sapporo Agricultural College

Egi Kazuyuki (江木 千之, Kazuyuki Egi; 21 May 1853 – 23 August 1932) was a Japanese bureaucrat and politician in Meiji and Taishō period.

== Biography ==
Egi Kazuyuki was the son of a samurai in Iwakuni, Suō Province. He attended the English School in Osaka and then began studying at the Sapporo Agricultural College and the Southern University (Daigaku Nankō). He transferred to the engineering school of Ministry of Industry, which he had to leave in 1874 due to illness. He then moved to the Ministry of Education and was initially a teacher at the Kaisei Academy in Arakawa, Tokyo.

He later became an inspector in the Ministry of Education and in 1890 a councilor before becoming Director General of the Department of General School Affairs in the Ministry of Education in 1891. In 1892 he moved to the Ministry of the Interior and became the secretary of Minister Inoue Kaoru. He then served as Governor of Ibaraki Prefecture (1896–1897), Tochigi Prefecture (1897), Aichi Prefecture (1897–1898), Hiroshima Prefecture (1898–1903), and Kumamoto Prefecture (1903–1907).

In 1904, Egi was awarded a seat in the House of Peers. In January 1924, he was appointed Minister of Education of the Kiyoura Cabinet, serving until the cabinet dissolved in June of the same year, and then became a member of the Privy Council.

He was a recipient of the Order of the Rising Sun (4th class, 1896; 2nd class, 1902; 1st class, 1906) and the Order of the Sacred Treasure (4th class, 1895; 3rd class, 1899) as well as being a member of the French Legion of Honour (joined 1901).

Political offices
Preceded by Chikaaki Takasaki	Governor of Ibaraki Prefecture; 1896-1897	Succeeded by Motohiro Onoda
Preceded by Sato Nobu	Governor of Tochigi Prefecture; 1897	Succeeded by Sento Kiyoshi
Preceded by Tokito Tanemoto	Governor of Aichi Prefecture; 1897-1898	Succeeded by Mori Mamoru
Preceded by Hattori Ichizo	Governor of Hiroshima Prefecture; 1898–1903	Succeeded by Tokuhisa Tsunenori
Preceded by Tokuhisa Tsunenori	Governor of Kumamoto Prefecture; 1903-1907	Succeeded by Nori Oshikawa
Preceded by Okano Keijirō	Minister of Education; 1924	Succeeded by Okada Ryōhei
