= Toshio Honma =

Japanese government official and businessman

- 本間 利雄
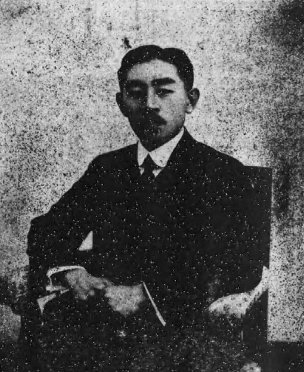

Governor of Yamanashi Prefecture
- In office 24 June 1924 – 28 April 1925
- Monarch: Taishō
- Preceded by: Mitsusada Umetani
- Succeeded by: Kurose Hiroshi

Governor of Nagano Prefecture
- In office 16 October 1922 – 24 June 1924
- Monarch: Taishō
- Preceded by: Tadahiko Okada
- Succeeded by: Mitsusada Umetani

Personal details
- Born: 3 March 1877 Yamagata Prefecture, Japan
- Died: 2 February 1970 (aged 92)
- Relatives: Ikeda Shigeaki (brother-in-law)
- Education: Tokyo Imperial University

Toshio Honma (3 March 1877 - 2 February 1970) was a Japanese Home Ministry and Police Bureau government official and businessman. He was born in Yamagata Prefecture. He was a graduate of Tokyo Imperial University. He was governor of Nagano Prefecture (1922–1924) and Yamanashi Prefecture (1924–1925).

| Preceded by Tadahiko Okada | Governors of Nagano; 1922–1924 | Succeeded by Mitsusada Umetani |
| Preceded by Mitsusada Umetani | Governor of Yamanashi Prefecture; 1924–1925 | Succeeded by Kurose Hiroshi |
