= IB Daiwa =

IB Daiwa Corporation
- Industry: Energy and resources; food
- Founded: 1947
- Headquarters: Tokyo
- Key people: Seiki Takahashi, President, CEO
- Website: IB Daiwa website in English

IB Daiwa Corporation (株式会社アイビーダイワ) is a Japanese multi-national business conglomerate with headquarters in Tokyo. Daiwa's primary interests are in the resources and energy business in the United States and Australia; and the company is also involved in the food business.

== History ==
Daiwa was started in 1947 as a manufacturer of industrial use machine sewing thread and twisted yarns. The company subsequently diversified.

Following the 2011 Tohoku earthquake and tsunami, the series of Fukushima I nuclear accidents included the discovery of a roughly 20 cm crack in a concrete-lined basin behind the No. 2 reactor's turbine building. Daiwa provided a water-gel polymer mix which was introduced into the basin in an attempt to plug the leak; but the attempt was initially unsuccessful. In due course, the Tokyo Electric Power Company (TEPCO) announced that an injection of 6,000 litres (1,600 US gal) of polymer coagulant into the pit did mitigate the leaking; however, the International Atomic Energy Agency (IAEA) and others credit additional factors as well.
