= Ichiro Yoda =

Japanese politician

- 依田 銈次郎
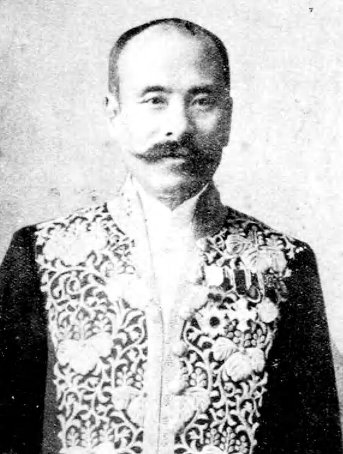

Governor of Hiroshima Prefecture
- In office 19 July 1921 – 16 October 1922
- Monarch: Taishō
- Preceded by: Raizo Wakabayashi
- Succeeded by: Kamehiko Abe

Governor of Yamagata Prefecture
- In office 12 December 1917 – 19 July 1921
- Monarch: Taishō
- Preceded by: Keiichirō Soeda
- Succeeded by: Izumi Morimoto

Governor of Nagano Prefecture
- In office 3 April 1913 – 28 April 1914
- Monarch: Taishō
- Preceded by: Teikan Chiba
- Succeeded by: Yūichirō Chikaraishi

Governor of Gunma Prefecture
- In office 28 March 1912 – 30 December 1912
- Monarchs: Meiji; Taishō
- Preceded by: Junji Kamiyama
- Succeeded by: Kurogane Yasuyoshi

Personal details
- Born: 26 August 1860 Sasayama Domain, Japan
- Died: 28 September 1933 (aged 73)
- Party: Rikken Seiyūkai
- Education: Nishogakusha University

Ichiro Yoda (26 August 1860 – 28 September 1933) was a Japanese politician who served as the governor of Hiroshima Prefecture from July 1921 to October 1922. Prior to that, he served as the governor of Gunma Prefecture (1912), and of Nagano Prefecture (1913–1914).

Preceded by Uruji Kamiyama	Governor of Gunma Prefecture; 1912	Succeeded by Yasuyoshi Kurogane
Preceded by Teikan Chiba	Governor of Nagano Prefecture; 1913-1914	Succeeded by Yūichirō Chikaraishi
Preceded by Raizo Wakabayashi	Governor of Hiroshima Prefecture; 1921–1922	Succeeded by Kamehiko Abe
