= Hakuji Nagayasu =

Japanese politician

- 永安 百治

Governor of Nagano Prefecture
- In office 9 January 1942 – 10 January 1943
- Monarch: Hirohito
- Preceded by: Minoru Suzuki
- Succeeded by: Yoshio Kōriyama

Governor of Kagawa Prefecture
- In office 9 April 1940 – 9 January 1942
- Monarch: Hirohito
- Preceded by: Nagatoshi Fujioka
- Succeeded by: Yoshiji Kosuge

Personal details
- Born: 13 April 1895 Hyōgo Prefecture, Japan
- Died: 10 January 1943 (aged 47)

Hakuji Nagayasu (永安 百治, Nagayasu Hakuji; 13 April 1895 – 10 January 1943) was a Japanese politician. He was born in Hyōgo Prefecture. He was governor of Kagawa Prefecture (1941–1942) and Nagano Prefecture (1942–1943).

== Bibliography ==
- Ikuhiko Hata, Comprehensive Encyclopedia of the Japanese Bureaucracy: 1868 - 2000, University of Tokyo Press, 2001.

Preceded by	Governor of Kagawa Prefecture; 1941-1942	Succeeded by
Preceded by Minoru Suzuki	Governor of Nagano; 1942-1943	Succeeded by Yoshio Kōriyama
