= Yamada Nobumichi =

Japanese statesman

Junior Second Rank Baron Yamada Nobumichi
- 山田 信道
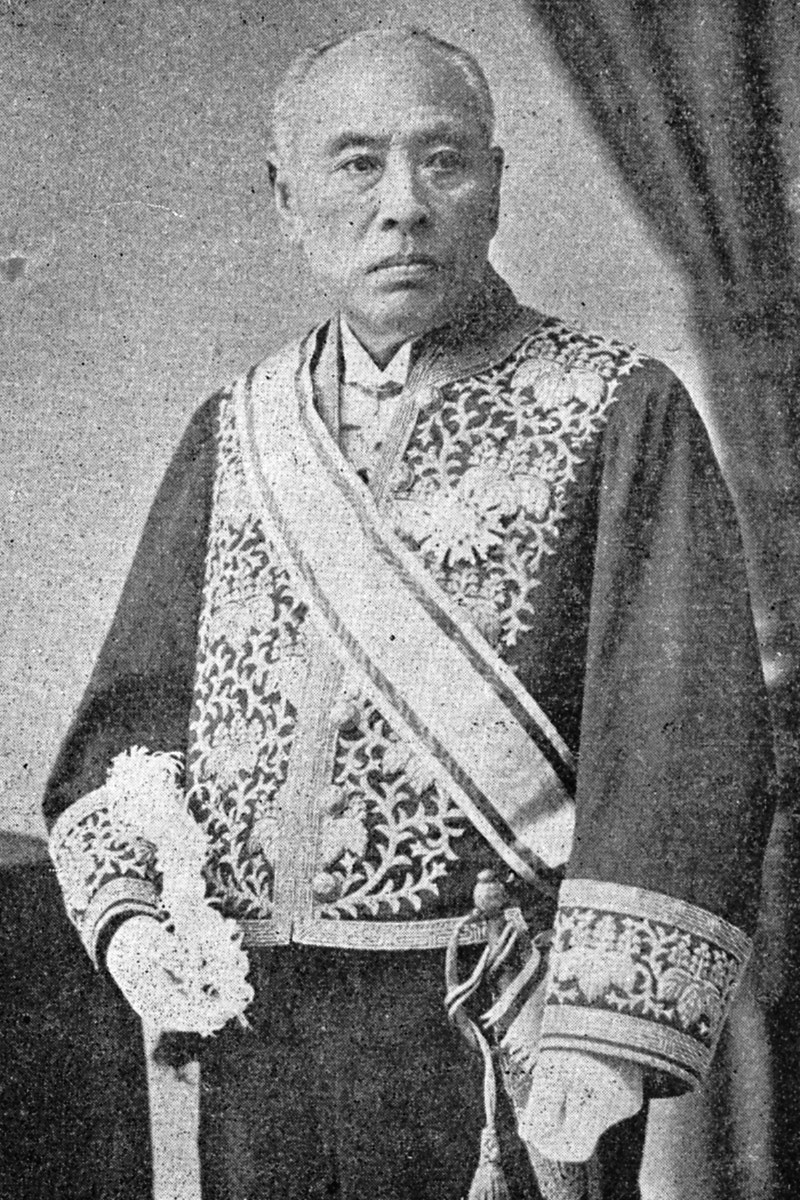
- Yamada Nobumichi

President of the Board of Audit
- In office 22 December 1898 – 11 March 1900
- Preceded by: Noboru Watanabe
- Succeeded by: Utsumi Tadakatsu

Minister of Agriculture and Commerce
- In office 8 November 1897 – 12 January 1898
- Prime Minister: Matsukata Masayoshi
- Preceded by: Ōkuma Shigenobu
- Succeeded by: Itō Miyoji
Gubernatorial offices
Governor of Kyoto Prefecture
In office October 1895 – November 1897
Monarch	Meiji
Preceded by	Chiaki Watanabe
Succeeded by	Utsumi Tadakatsu
Governor of Osaka Prefecture
In office 15 June 1891 – 10 October 1895
Monarch	Meiji
Preceded by	Nishimura Sutezō
Succeeded by	Utsumi Tadakatsu
Governor of Fukushima Prefecture
In office 19 October 1888 – 15 June 1891
Monarch	Meiji
Preceded by	Orita Heinai
Succeeded by	Kiyoshi Watanabe
Governor of Tottori Prefecture
In office 12 September 1881 – 19 October 1888
Monarch	Meiji
Preceded by	Ijūin Kaneyoshi
Succeeded by	Morimasa Takei

Personal details
- Born: 13 December 1833 Kumamoto, Higo, Japan
- Died: 11 March 1900 (aged 66)
- Resting place: Aoyama Cemetery

Baron Yamada Nobumichi (山田 信道; 13 December 1833 – 11 March 1900) was a statesman in early Meiji period Japan.

== Biography ==
Yamada was born in Kumamoto Domain, Higo Province (present-day Kumamoto Prefecture). He was active in the Sonnō jōi movement, relocated to Satsuma Domain during the Bakumatsu period. Captured by security forces of the Tokugawa shogunate in 1863, he was sentenced to five years in prison.

After the Meiji restoration, Yamada was recruited into the new Meiji government and was assigned as governor of the short-lived Esashi Prefecture (now part of Akita and Iwate Prefectures in 1871.

Although Yamada was sympathetic to the grievances of the ex-samurai class and personally acquainted with many of the leaders of the Shinpūren Rebellion in his native Kumamoto, he remained loyal to the Meiji government throughout the uprising. He was rewarded with the governorships of Tottori Prefecture (1881–1888), Fukushima Prefecture (1888–1891), Osaka Prefecture (1891–1895) and Kyoto Prefecture (1895–1897). On 5 June 1896, he was elevated to the rank of baron (danshaku) in the kazoku peerage system.

Yamada was selected Minister of Agriculture & Commerce in the second Matsukata Masayoshi cabinet from 1897-1898. He subsequently served as chairman of the Board of Audit to his death in 1900. His grave is at the Aoyama Cemetery in Tokyo.

Political offices
Preceded by Okuma Shigenobu	Minister of Agriculture & Commerce; Nov 1897 – Jan 1898	Succeeded by Itō Miyoji
Preceded by Chiaki Watanabe	Governor of Kyoto; Dec 1895 – Nov 1897	Succeeded by Tadakatsu Utsumi
