= List of governors of Okayama Prefecture =

This is a list of governors of Okayama Prefecture:

- Igi Tadazumi 1871
- Shinjō Atsunobu 1871-1873
- Ishibe Seichū 1873-1875
- Takasaki Goroku 1875-1884
- Chisaka Takamasa 1886-1894
- Kono Chuzo 1894-1897
- Chikaaki Takasaki 1897-1900
- Yoshihara Saburo 1900-1902
- Higaki Naosuke 1902-1906
- Terada Yushi 1906-1908
- Taniguchi Tomegoro 1908-1911
- Tsunamasa Ōyama 1911-1913
- Masao Kishimoto 1927-1928
- Minabe Choji 1928-1929
- Hirokichi Nishioka 1947-1951
- Yukiharu Miki 1951-1964
- Takenori Kato 1964-1972
- Shiro Nagano 1972-1996
- Masahiro Ishii 1996-2012
- Ryuta Ibaragi 2012–present
