= Nabeshima Miki =

Japanese politician

Baron Nabeshima Miki
- 鍋島 幹
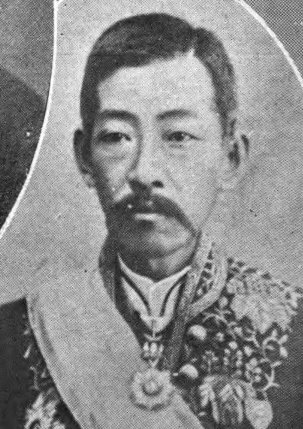

Member of the House of Peers
- In office 11 September 1896 – 1 September 1913 Nominated by the Emperor

Member of the Genrōin
- In office 27 June 1881 – 24 July 1886
Gubernatorial offices
Governor of Hiroshima Prefecture
In office 26 December 1889 – 23 April 1896
Monarch	Meiji
Preceded by	Sadaaki Senda
Succeeded by	Orita Heinai
Governor of Aomori Prefecture
In office 24 July 1886 – 26 December 1889
Monarch	Meiji
Preceded by	Fukushima Kyūsei
Succeeded by	Sawa Tadashi
Governor of Tochigi Prefecture
In office 13 November 1871 – 29 October 1880
Monarch	Meiji
Preceded by	Office established
Succeeded by	Fujikawa Tamechika

Personal details
- Born: 23 October 1844 Saga, Hizen, Japan
- Died: 1 September 1913 (aged 68)

Nabeshima Miki (23 October 1844 – 1 September 1913) was a Japanese politician who served as governor of Hiroshima Prefecture in 1889–1896. He was governor of Tochigi Prefecture (1871–1880) and Governor of Aomori Prefecture (1886–1889).

Preceded by Sadaaki Senda	Governor of Hiroshima Prefecture; 1889–1896	Succeeded by Orita Heinai
