= List of governors of Nagano Prefecture =

This is a list of governors of Nagano Prefecture:

- Kaneyoshi Tachiki 1871–1873
- Hironao Narasaki 1873–1881
- Makoto Ono 1881–1884
- Seiichi Kinashi 1884–1889
- Utsumi Tadakatsu 1889–1891
- Asada Tokunori 1891–1896
- Chikaaki Takasaki 1896–1897
- Kan'ichi Gondo 1897–1898
- Isamu Sonoyama 1898–1899
- Norikichi Oshikawa 1899–1902
- Kiyohide Seki 1902–1905
- Tsunamasa Ōyama 1905–1911
- Teikan Chiba 1911–1913
- Ichiro Yoda 1913–1914
- Yūichirō Chikaraishi 1914–1915
- Tenta Akaboshi 1915–1921
- Tadahiko Okada 1921–1922
- Toshio Honma 1922–1924
- Mitsusada Umetani 1924–1926
- Morio Takahashi 1926–1927
- Ryo Chiba 1927–1929
- Shintarō Suzuki 1929–1931
- Kuraji Ishigaki 1931–1933
- Shōzō Okada 1933–1935
- Seiichi Ōmura 1935–1936
- Shunsuke Kondo 1936–1938
- Seiichi Ōmura January 11–December 23, 1938
- Kenji Tomita 1938–1940
- Minoru Suzuki 1940–1942
- Hakuji Nagayasu 1942–1943
- Yoshio Kōriyama 1943–1944
- Yasuo Ōtsubo 1944–1945
- Kunrō Mononobe 1945–1947
- Yoshio Iyoku March–April 1947
- Torao Hayashi 1947–1959
- Gon'ichirō Nishizawa 1959–1980
- Goro Yoshimura 1980–2000
- Yasuo Tanaka 2000–2006
- Jin Murai 2006–2010
- Shuichi Abe 2010–
