= Makoto Sakurai =

Japanese political activist (born 1972)

- 桜井 誠
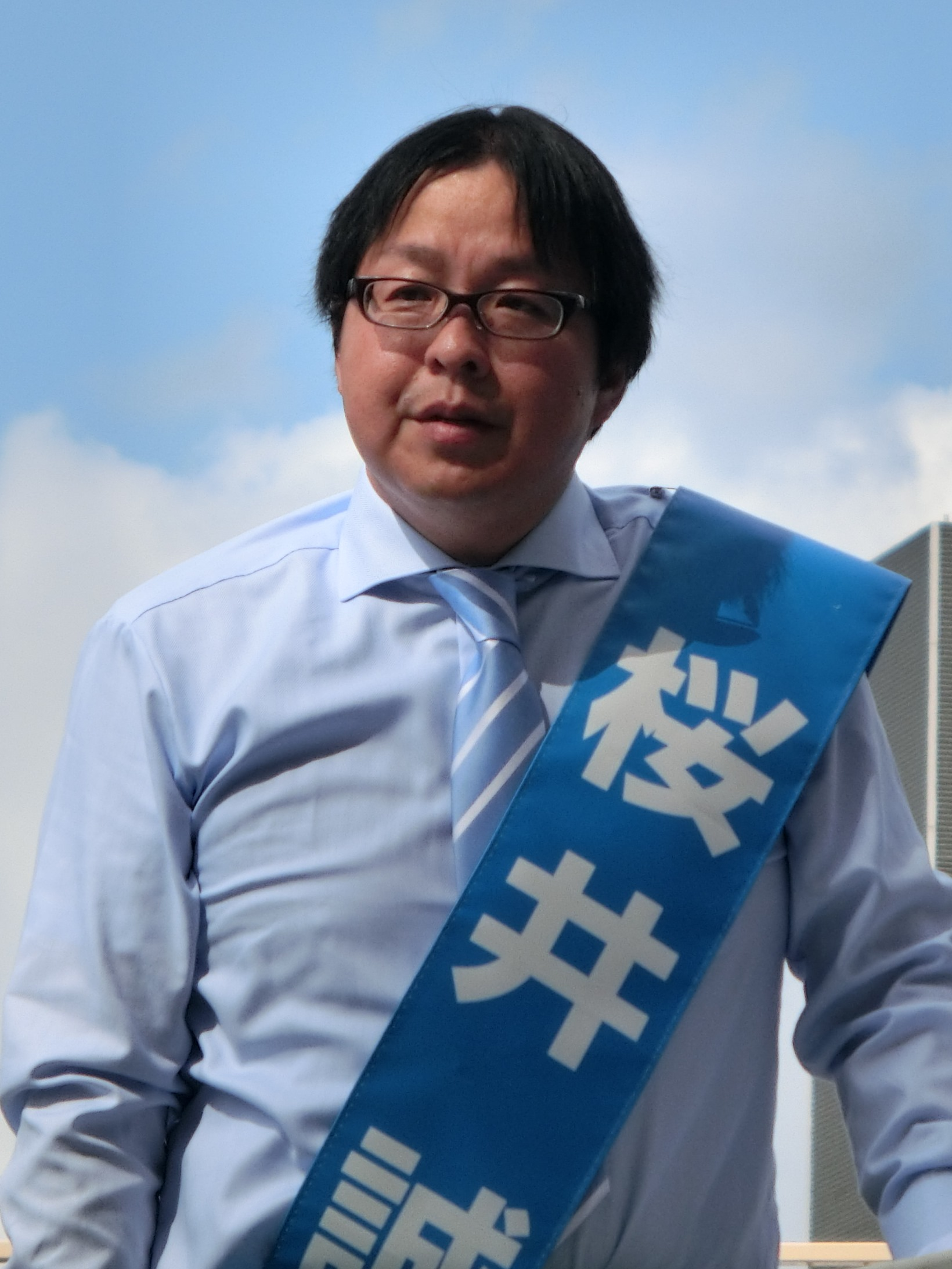
- Makoto Sakurai in front of Ueno Station on July 24, 2016, during the 2016 Tokyo gubernatorial election

Leader of the Japan First Party
- In office February 26, 2017 – February 16, 2025
- Preceded by: Position established
- Succeeded by: Takako Yamaguchi

Personal details
- Born: Makoto Takata (髙田 誠, Takata Makoto); February 15, 1972 (age 54) Kitakyushu, Fukuoka Prefecture, Japan
- Party: Japan First
- Known for: Founder and former leader of Zaitokukai
- Website: ameblo.jp/doronpa01/ (in Japanese)

Takata Makoto (髙田 誠; born February 15, 1972), better known by the pen name Makoto Sakurai (桜井 誠, Sakurai Makoto), is a Japanese political activist, blogger, and writer from Kitakyushu in Fukuoka Prefecture. A former civil servant in a ward office, he is the founder and former leader of the far-right nationalist group Zaitokukai, known for its anti-foreign messages and public demonstrations which some consider unruly. Following his unsuccessful campaign in the 2016 Tokyo gubernatorial election, he founded the Japan First Party in August 2016 and stepped down as the party's leader in 2025 due to heart failure.

== Name ==
Sakurai refers to himself as "Makoto Sakurai" in public and publishes under the same name. It has been speculated that his real name may be Makoto Kimura (木村 誠, Kimura Makoto), as he was introduced as such when he first appeared on television, on the show Jene Jan (ジェネジャン) in January 2005. However, on May 10, 2017, he tweeted a picture of a document pertaining to the Tokyo Gubernatorial Election with his real name "Makoto Takata" (髙田 誠, Takata Makoto), along with his pen name that he is known as written on it.

== Activism ==
=== Online presence ===
Sakurai maintains an online presence under the username "Doronpa" and similar variations. He is currently active on his blog, Twitter, and TwitCasting accounts.

While Sakurai was a civil servant, he started gaining interest in South Korea through the Internet, and came to the conclusion that "South Korea is a rare country that one hates more the more they learn about it" (韓国という国は、知れば知るほど嫌いになる希有の国). He then afterwards relied on a Japanese-Korean online bulletin board to have thorough discussions with South Korean netizens. It is through this bulletin board he was invited to discuss South Korea in the TV show mentioned above, with himself the only one against the popularity of the country in Japan.

=== Zaitokukai ===
On December 2, 2006, Sakurai founded the nationalist political group Zaitokukai, short for Zainichi Tokken-wo Yurusanai Shimin-no Kai (在日特権を許さない市民の会, "Association of Citizens against the Special Privileges of the Zainichi") and held an inaugural meeting the next month, in response to a TV news report about a group of Japanese citizens supporting Zainichi Koreans' ability to obtain national pensions without making any premium payments. Disturbed by the news and thinking that it could potentially destroy the Japanese pension system, he searched for a political organization fighting against Zainichi rights in Japan, only to find none, which led him to establish the Zaitokukai. The goals of this group is to abolish special rights towards foreigners, Koreans in particular, on the basis of nationalism, law, and the numerous criminal acts made by the perpetrators.

Sakurai was arrested by Japanese police on June 16, 2013, in Tokyo after an anti-Korean demonstration by Zaitokukai members ended in a fistfight with counterprotesters.

Sakurai held a public debate with Osaka mayor Tōru Hashimoto on October 20, 2014, regarding hate speech. The meeting lasted for only eight minutes, as Hashimoto ultimately left the stage along with his security detail after intense shouting and insulting from both sides.

On November 11, 2014, Sakurai announced that he would step down as leader of the Zaitokukai and leave the group on the 30th of the same month.

== Politics ==
Before contesting to become the governor of Tokyo in 2016, Sakurai had stated numerous times that he would not enter the world of politics. During an assembly conducted by the Zaitokukai on August 30, 2009, in response to a participant's question regarding whether Sakurai would advance into the political world, Sakurai answered that he "would not go as far as setting aside his current life just to advance into the world of politics", denying his intention to run for office. During the debate with Osaka major Toru Hashimoto in October 2014, after receiving an explanation from Hashimoto about the responsibilities of a politician, Sakurai replied that he is not interested in becoming one. When Sakurai announced his intention to step down as leader of Zaitokukai and leave the group, he stated once again he would not be a politician.

=== 2016 Tokyo gubernatorial election ===
Following the resignation of Yōichi Masuzoe as the governor of Tokyo, Sakurai announced his candidacy in June 2016. There was a total of 21 candidates, a record breaking number for this position.

Compared to the three main candidates (Yuriko Koike, Hiroya Masuda, and Shuntaro Torigoe), Sakurai received little media coverage during the campaign, along with seventeen other candidates, and he criticized the media in his speeches for the unequal treatment. This criticism got the approval from his rival Mac Akasaka, who was also running for Tokyo Governor. When Sakurai was featured in news coverage, however, newspapers such as The Asahi Shimbun and Tokyo Shimbun criticized Sakurai, claiming he took advantage of the election to deliver hate speech. Sankei Shimbun was the only large newspaper to feature Sakurai either neutrally or positively, even going as far as conducting a close reporting in Sakurai's campaign office the moment of the vote counting. The election placed him fifth place, with 114,171 votes or 1.74% of the popular vote.

Sakurai had seven promises for the residents of Tokyo:

1. Abolish welfare for foreigners (Note: Permanent residents (永住者) are allowed welfare as stated in the Welfare Law. Sakurai incorrectly claims that these laws do not allow foreigners to receive welfare.)
2. Halve the number of illegal immigrants within Tokyo
3. Create a law banning anti-Japanese hate speech (Note: This is in response to the then-newly passed Hate Speech Act (June 3, 2016), which regulates hate speech toward foreigners living in Japan. Sakurai would have created a law to regulate hate speech toward Japanese by foreigners and the Japanese themselves.)
4. Legalize marijuana and send all tax revenue to the Yamaguchi-gumi yakuza syndicate
5. Enforce the regulation of pachinko, a de facto form of gambling, which is illegal in Japan
6. Cancel the establishment of a new Korean school in Tokyo
7. Enforce a more compact Tokyo Olympics

He claimed that by fulfilling these promises, money and pride would go back to the hands of the Japanese to better suit the lives of the Japanese people instead of foreigners and foreign countries. Sakurai's catch phrase was "Japan First" (日本第一・ジャパンファースト).

Aside from his promises, Sakurai criticized the Liberal Democratic Party for supporting Yoichi Masuzoe during the 2014 Tokyo gubernatorial election, only for him to use public money for unnecessary expenses and personal affairs leading to his resignation. Moreover, Sakurai criticized the Japanese people, especially those in their 20s and 30s, who do not vote. He urged everyone to take 20–30 minutes to go to the voting booth to cast their opinion so that there can be change in the politicians themselves, which Sakurai also criticized. He did not beg voters to vote for him; only to cast their votes.

During the campaign, Sakurai received several death threats. The culprits were high school students, all of whom were written up and given warnings.

=== 2020 Tokyo gubernatorial election ===
On June 4, 2020, he announced his intention to run for the 2020 Tokyo gubernatorial election being held on July 5 of the same year. He was running as "a candidate recommended by the Japan First Party." The public promises that he touted in the election this time had been drastically reduced from the seven in the previous 2016 Metrop gubernatorial elect, and had become three: "zero Tokyo inhabitant's taxes and fixed property taxes, (Note: A public promise with a two-year limit in regard to the novel coronavirus infection. Moreover, he also touted that he would reduce the Governor of Tokyo's salary to zero for only one year.)" "the regulation of pachinko," and "the immediate shutdown of welfare for foreign citizens."

About his election campaign after June 18, 2020, he was concerned about the impact of the novel coronavirus infection, so he cancelled the conventional street speeches that bring people together outdoors, and he aimed at virtual street propaganda and interviews by web broadcasts. In exceptional cases, he had carried out protest street propaganda that travelled to the Embassy of China and other places in a way that did not give prior notice so that they did not bring people together. Prior to the Metrop gubernatorial elect, he was concerned about the spread of novel coronavirus, so he had submitted a written request for the postponement of the election to the Ministry of Internal Affairs and Communications.

On June 24, 2020, during a Toranomon News (Tsukasa Jōnen and Kent Gilbert appeared) studio broadcast (8:30 a.m.), he caused a disturbance by pulling an election campaign car in front of the studio, involving the audience in it, criticizing Jōnen by name and so on. About the reports that Sakurai himself, who had prepared in advance, decided on controversial statements when Toranomon News denounced Sakurai in the program on that day, Asahi Shimbun and Kanagawa Shimbun that Toranomon News had originally denounced are those which have reported them as articles in the past, and in addition, is not that which Sakurai himself said those controversial statements are not those which Sakurai himself made.

On July 6, an apology for unauthorized use to the person entitled to Sakurai's street propaganda videos in the Toranomon News (appearances: Ippei Orishima, Tsukasa Jōnen and Kent Gilbert) broadcast on June 24 was made.

As for the results of the election, he received 178,784 votes but lost in fifth place. Sakurai said, "Indeed, I have been defeated in the election this time. I would like to hope for Ms. Yuriko Koike's future success. However, I think that this election at this time has set one major guideline. Virtual elections, virtual street propaganda and virtual interviews. Through these kinds of things, I suspect I was able to have everybody also feel the power of the virtual and the Net even just a little. And the next election. It means that we must make the most of them in the next election." Even though the voter turnout in the election had decreased compared to 2016 last time, the percentage of votes won increased from 1.74% last time to 2.92%.

=== 2021 Japanese general election ===
Sakurai was a candidate in the 2021 Japanese general election for the Japan First Party in the Tokyo 15th district. He received 9,449 votes or 3.96% which was the highest percentage of votes he received to date. The party also received 33,661 votes in the Tokyo proportional representation block.

=== 2024 Tokyo gubernatorial election ===
Sakurai was a candidate in the 2024 Tokyo gubernatorial election for the Japan First Party. He received 83,600 votes or 1.2%.

== Election results ==
=== Tokyo gubernatorial ===
Election	Candidate	Result		
Election	Candidate	Result	Votes	%
2016	Makoto Sakurai	Lost	114,171	1.74
2020	Makoto Sakurai	Lost	178,784	2.92
2024	Makoto Sakurai	Lost	83,600	1.20

=== General election ===
Election	Candidate	Party	District	Result	Votes	%
2021	Makoto Sakurai	Japan First	Tokyo's 15th	Lost	9,449	4.0

== Publications ==
All publications are in Japanese and there are no known English translations.

- 大嫌韓時代 [The Anti-Korean Era] (in Japanese). Seirindō. September 24, 2014. ISBN 978-4792605025.
- 大嫌韓日記 [The Anti-Korean Diary] (in Japanese). Seirindō. June 16, 2016. ISBN 978-4792605544.
- 日本第一党宣言 [Japan First Party Declaration] (in Japanese). Seirindō. May 20, 2017. ISBN 978-4792605902.

Articles written by Sakurai occasionally appeared in the magazine Japanism, published by Seirindō.

== See also ==
- Ultranationalism
- Uyoku dantai
