= Torigoe =

Torigoe (written: 鳥越) is a Japanese surname. Notable people with the surname include:

- Megumi Torigoe (鳥越 恵), Japanese women's footballer
- Shuntaro Torigoe (鳥越 俊太郎, born 1940), Japanese journalist and activist
- Yusuke Torigoe (鳥越 裕介, born 1971), Japanese baseball player

== See also ==
- Torigoe, Ishikawa, a former village in Ishikawa District, Ishikawa Prefecture, Japan
