= Makoto Sakurai (disambiguation) =

Makoto Sakurai could refer to:

- Makoto Sakurai, an activist of Zaitokukai
- Makoto Sakurai (drummer) (桜井 誠) a member of Dragon Ash
- Makoto Sakurai, a fictional character in Nichijou
