= 2016 Tokyo gubernatorial election =

Election for Governor of Tokyo

- 31 July 2016
- Turnout: 59.73% ▲13.59 pp
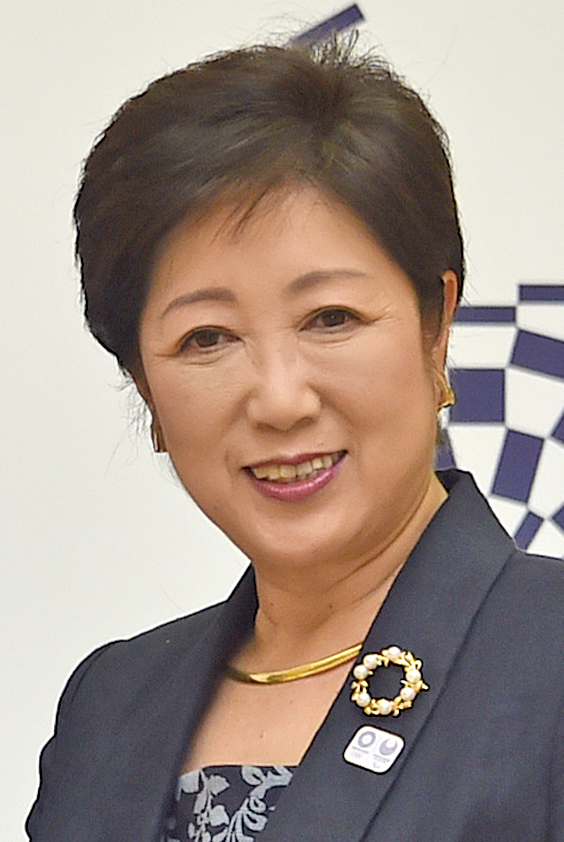

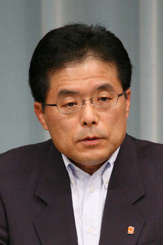

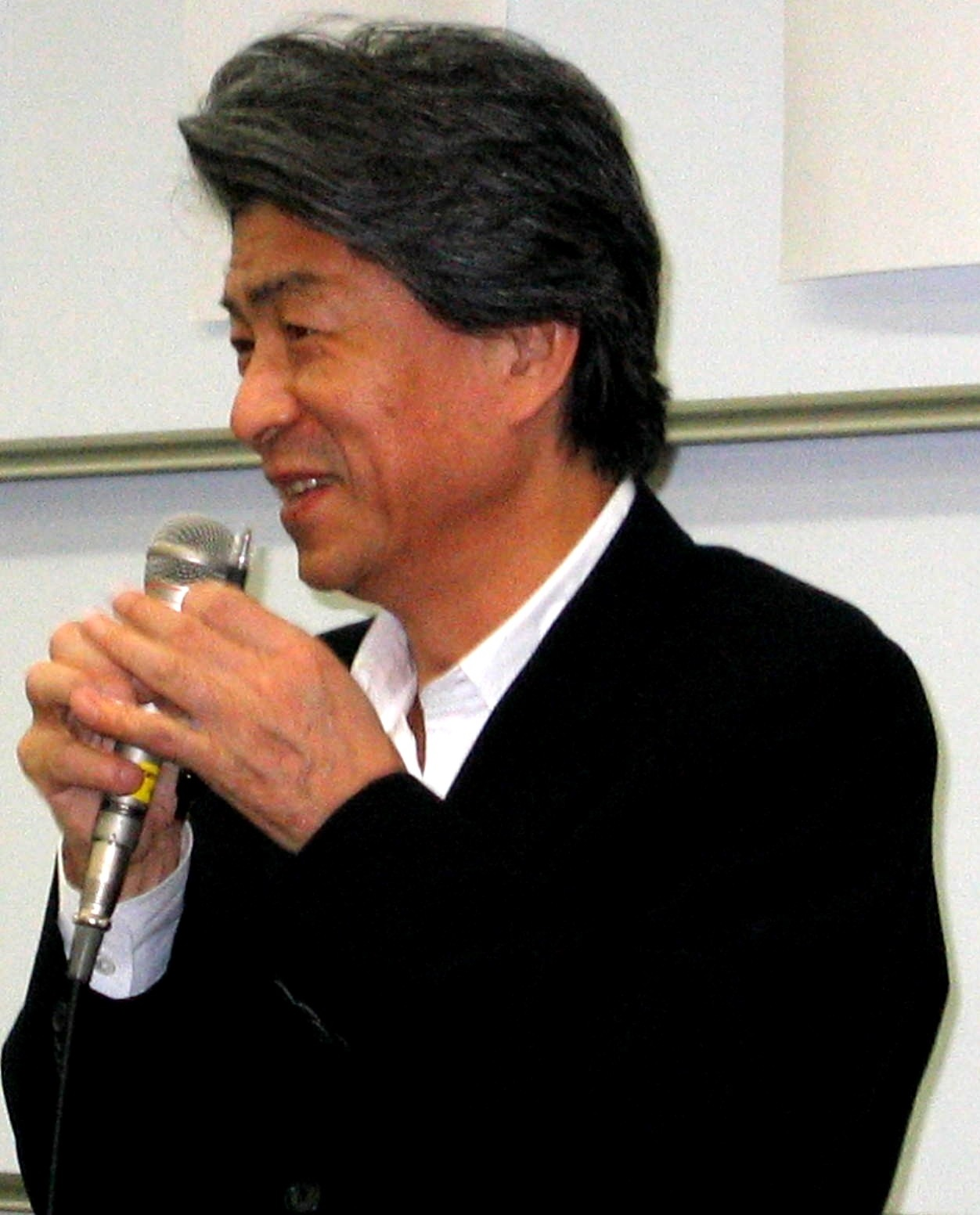
Candidate	Yuriko Koike	Hiroya Masuda	Shuntaro Torigoe
Party	Independent	Independent	Independent
Popular vote	2,912,628	1,793,453	1,346,103
Percentage	44.49%	27.4%	20.56%
Supported by	—	LDP, Komeito, Kokoro	DP, JCP, SDP, PLP, TSN
- Koike swept all main island municipalities except Hinohara village, she won her largest margin in Toshima ward in her former lower house district, Masuda only carried Hinohara and a few towns and villages on the Izu islands.
Governor before election
Yoichi Masuzoe
Independent
Elected Governor
Yuriko Koike
Independent

The 2016 Tokyo gubernatorial election took place on 31 July 2016 to elect the successor to Governor Yoichi Masuzoe, who submitted his resignation to the Tokyo Metropolitan Assembly on 15 June 2016. By-elections in four of Tokyo's cities were held on the same day to fill vacancies in the Assembly.

Former Defense Minister Yuriko Koike won the election by a wide margin. Turnout increased sharply to 59% from 46% in the previous election.

== Background ==
Yoichi Masuzoe, a former national Minister of Health, Labour, and Welfare, was elected in the February 2014 election. At the election he was endorsed by the Liberal Democratic Party (LDP) and Komeito and received more than 2.11 million votes, more than double his nearest opponent in the seven-candidate race. He replaced Naoki Inose, who had resigned in the second year of his four-year term due to a political funds scandal.

In May 2016 reports surfaced concerning Masuzoe's misuse of public funds, including the use of his chauffeur-driven government car to travel to and from his holiday house on most weekends. As examination into his spending continued, it was found that he had misused funds to purchase items for personal use, including art, comics, and meals, as well as paying for his family to stay in hotels that were accounted as meeting-related expenses. An independent investigation ultimately determined that he had acted inappropriately but not illegally. Despite this, surveys showed that more than 90% of Tokyo residents were dissatisfied with how he handled the issue and the lack of a clear explanation.

As pressure grew on Masuzoe to resign, a no-confidence motion jointly submitted by all of the parties represented in the Tokyo Metropolitan Assembly was to be put to a vote on the afternoon of 15 June. As the motion was likely to pass and wanting to avoid further disruption to the governing of the city, Masuzoe submitted his resignation to assembly President Shigeo Kawai on the morning of the 15th, to become effective as of 21 June.

== Candidates ==
A total of 21 candidates were nominated for the election. Yuriko Koike, a former Minister of Defence and incumbent member for the Tokyo 10th district in the House of Representatives, announced her candidacy despite not receiving an endorsement from the Liberal Democratic Party. Instead, the LDP (along with Komeito and the Party for Japanese Kokoro) endorsed Hiroya Masuda, who is a former Minister of Internal Affairs and Communications and former governor of Iwate Prefecture. Actor Junichi Ishida was approached by the Democratic Party but ultimately declined to run. Ultimately, the Democratic Party and other opposition parties (including the Communist and Social Democratic parties) endorsed veteran journalist Shuntaro Torigoe. Kenji Utsunomiya, former head of the Japan Federation of Bar Associations and a candidate in the two previous gubernatorial elections, announced his intention to run on 11 July but withdrew two days later.

The Guardian stated that the election "has piqued interest not only because of the size of the task which falls to its victor, but also for the mud slinging and misogyny which has characterised the fight between the candidates." Former Tokyo governor Shintaro Ishihara made disparaging remarks regarding Koike's age and use of makeup, and characterized Torigoe as a "traitor to his country" for questioning Japanese protection of the Senkaku Islands. Torigoe was attacked in a tabloid magazine with allegations that he seduced a 20-year-old university student ten years earlier, in what some viewed as a deliberate smear campaign by his opposition.

Candidates
Name	Age	Party (Endorsements)	Notes
Shōgo Takahashi	32	Independent	
Yujiro Taniyama	43	Independent	
Makoto Sakurai	44	Independent	Founder of Zaitokukai.
Shuntaro Torigoe	76	Independent (Democratic, Communist and Social Democratic, People's Life parties, Tokyo Seikatsusha Network)	
Hiroya Masuda	64	Independent (Liberal Democratic Party, Komeito, Party for Japanese Kokoro)	Former Minister of Internal Affairs and Communications, former governor of Iwate Prefecture
Mac Akasaka	67	Independent	Perennial candidate
Toshio Yamaguchi	75	People's Sovereignty Party	Former Minister of Labour
Masaaki Yamanaka	52	Future Creation Management Practice Party	
Teruki Gotō	33	Independent	Known for his naked election posters
Masatoshi Kishimoto	63	Independent	
Yuriko Koike	64	Independent	Former Minister of Defence
Takashi Uesugi	48	Independent	
Hiroko Nanami	32	Happiness Realization Party	
Chōzō Nakagawa	60	Independent	Former mayor of Kasai, Hyōgo
Yasuhiro Sekiguchi	64	Independent	
Takashi Tachibana	48	NHK Party	Former Funabashi city councillor
Masahiro Miyazaki	61	Independent	
Sadao Imao	76	Independent	
Yoshihiko Mochizuki	51	Independent	
Naoko Takei	51	Independent	
Hisao Naitō	59	Independent	

== Results ==
Tokyo gubernatorial election, 2016
Party	Candidate	Votes	%	±%
Independent	Yuriko Koike	2,912,628	44.49%	N/A
Independent (Supported by LDP, Komeito, Party for Japanese Kokoro)	Hiroya Masuda	1,793,453	27.40%	N/A
Independent (Supported by Democrats, Communist, Social Democrats, PLP, TSN)	Shuntaro Torigoe	1,346,103	20.56%	N/A
Independent	Takashi Uesugi	179,631	2.74%	N/A
Japan First	Makoto Sakurai	114,171	1.74%	N/A
Smile	Mac Akasaka	43,912	0.72%	N/A
Happiness Realization	Hiroko Nanami	28,809	0.44%	N/A
Anti-NHK	Takashi Tachibana	27,242	0.42%	N/A
Independent	Shōgo Takahashi	16,664	0.25%	N/A
Independent	Chōzō Nakagawa	16,584	0.25%	N/A
People's Sovereignty Party	Toshio Yamaguchi	15,986	0.24%	N/A
Independent	Masatoshi Kishimoto	8,056	0.12%	N/A
Independent	Teruki Gotō	7,031	0.11%	N/A
Independent	Yujiro Taniyama	6,759	0.1%	N/A
Independent	Yoshihiko Mochizuki	4,605	0.07%	N/A
Independent	Masahiro Miyazaki	4,010	0.06%	N/A
Independent	Yoshihiko Mochizuki	3,332	0.05%	N/A
Future Creation Management Practice Party	Masaki Yamanaka	3,332	0.05%	N/A
Independent	Sadao Imao	3,105	0.05%	N/A
Independent	Hisao Naitō	2,695	0.04%	N/A
Independent	Yasuhiro Sekiguchi	1,326	0.02%	N/A
Turnout		6,620,407	59.73%	▲13.59%
