= Toshio Tamogami =

Japanese general (born 1948)

Toshio Tamogami 田母神 俊雄
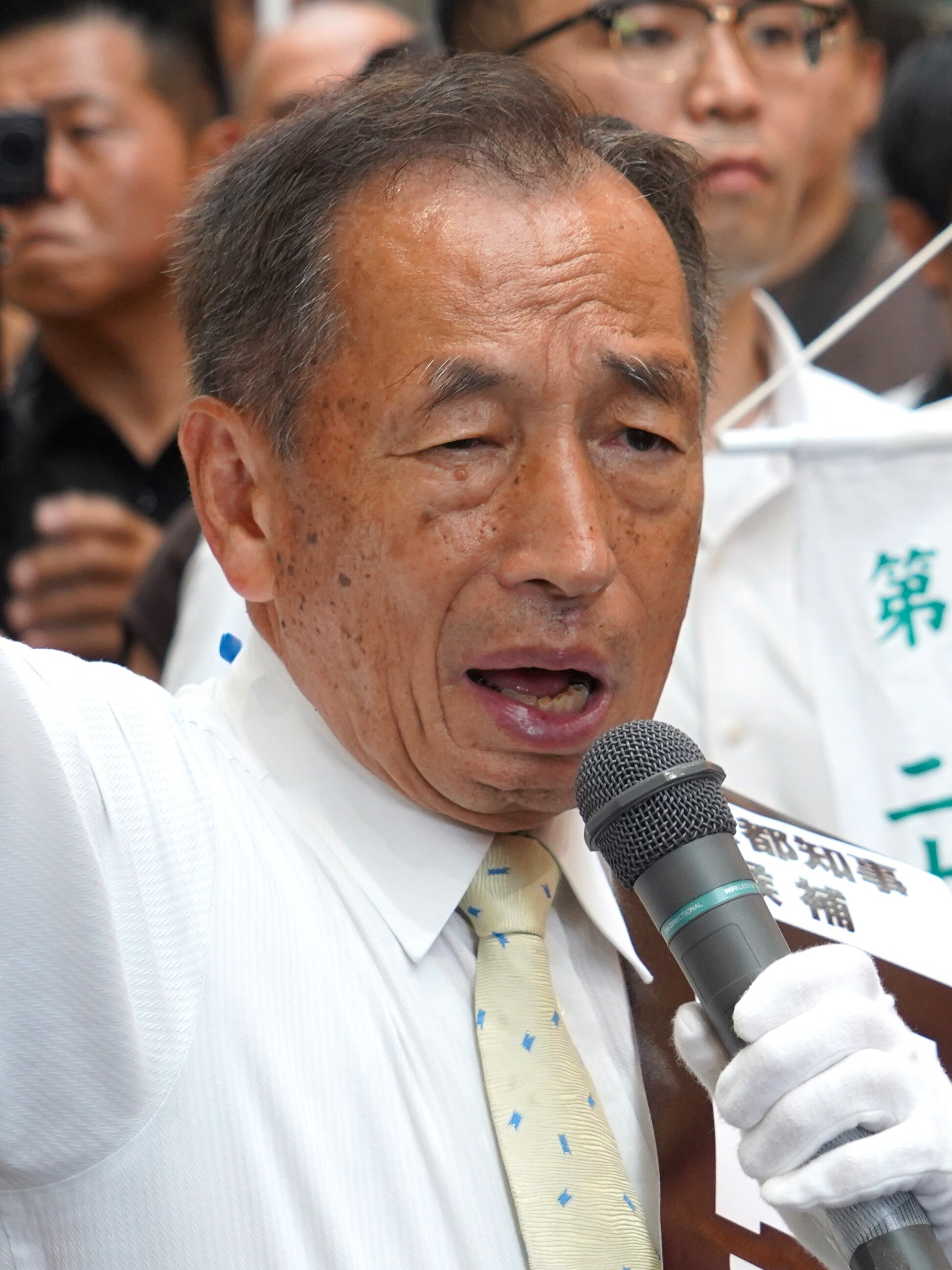
- Tamogami in 2024
- Born: July 22, 1948 (age 78); Kōriyama, Fukushima, Japan
- Alma mater: National Defense Academy of Japan (BS)
- Military career
- Allegiance: Japan
- Branch: Japan Air Self-Defense Force
- Service years: 1971–2008
- Rank: General
- Commands: Chief of Staff, Air Self Defense Force; Commander in Chief of the Air Defence Command; Southwestern Air Defense Force; 6th Air Wing

Signature
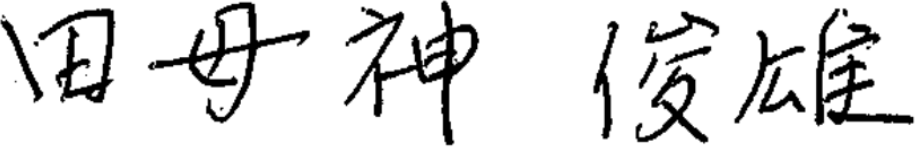

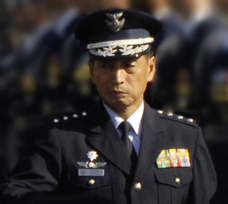
Gen. Toshio Tamogami in August 2008

Toshio Tamogami (田母神 俊雄, Tamogami Toshio; born July 22, 1948) is a retired Japan Air Self-Defense Force general and politician. He served as the Chief of Staff of the Air Self-Defense Force from March 2007 until his dismissal in October 31, 2008.

Tamogami was dismissed in 2008 due to a controversial essay he wrote. In the essay, he denied that Japan was an aggressor in World War II and claimed that Japan had been drawn into the war by Chiang Kai-shek and Franklin D. Roosevelt. He also argued that Japan's wartime actions were not acts of aggression but were justified as self-defense and efforts to "liberate Asia from Western colonialism."

Tamogami turned to politics following his retirement from the military. In 2014 he ran as a candidate for governor of Tokyo and for the House of Representatives; in which he both lost. He was arrested in April 2016 for alleged violations of campaign finance laws (illegal payments to supporters) in relation to his gubernatorial campaign. He made a political comeback in 2024 by running for the Tokyo gubernatorial election, but placed fourth and performed worse compared to his 2014 run. He has been described as a "champion of Japan's right wing". He denies that women were forced by the Empire of Japan into sex work as "comfort women" and that the Nanjing Massacre occurred.

== JASDF career ==
Tamogami graduated from Fukushima Prefectural Asaka High School in 1967 and the National Defense Academy of Japan in 1971 with a major in electrical engineering. He was promoted to lieutenant colonel in 1986, colonel in 1990, and major general in 1996. He was promoted to lieutenant general and appointed Head of the Joint Staff College on December 2, 2002, and appointed to Commander in Chief of the Air Defense Command on August 30, 2004. He was promoted to general and appointed Chief of Staff of the Air Self-Defense Force on March 28, 2007.

A member of the openly revisionist organization Nippon Kaigi, Tamogami gained attention in the press for a number of outspoken remarks in the latter days of his career. On the occasion of an unsuccessful civil case brought against the government for sending troops to Iraq, he remarked that he felt some of the activities of the Japan Air Self-Defense Force were against Japan's peace constitution, causing the litigants to claim a moral victory. On 14 July 2004, when questioned further about this supposed 'unconstitutionality' of the Air Self-Defense Force, he said that his opinion should not distress its members since (quoting the catch phrase of Yoshio Kojima, a popular comedian), "What does that matter?"

At a semipolitical meeting on the 15 September 2004, he said that he felt that it would probably be necessary for Japan to develop nuclear arms in order to be seen as an independent nation by China and that promising never to develop nuclear arms is "foolish." After the furor created by his essay and dismissal, he was asked, by a British journalist on 1 December 2008, whether he would have used nuclear arms against America in 1945; he responded he "might have considered using nuclear weapons against the United States had he been a general for a nuclear-capable Japan in 1945, especially if it was a case of nuking in response to the threat of American nuclear weapons."

Tamogami claimed that other members of the Japanese government and military share his views.

=== Essay controversy and dismissal ===
Tamogami was dismissed with a 60 million yen allowance due to an essay he published on October 31, 2008, arguing that "it is a false accusation to say (Japan) was an aggressor nation" during the Second Sino-Japanese War and World War II and that it was rather drawn into these wars by Chiang Kai-shek and Franklin D. Roosevelt, who had allegedly been manipulated by the Comintern. The essay further mentions that Soviet spies helped initiate the United States' war against Japan and that Roosevelt was tricked into it because he “was not aware of the terrible nature of communism”. The essay also argues that the war brought prosperity to occupied China, Taiwan and Korea, that "it is often those who never directly saw the Japanese military who are spreading rumors about the army's act of brutality", and that the Greater East Asia War is viewed in a positive way by many Asian countries. It criticizes the war crimes trials, which followed the war.

Following the essay's publication, Defense Minister Yasukazu Hamada removed Tamogami from the post and ordered him to retire since its viewpoint contradicted the government position and was likely to anger Japan's regional neighbors. Tamogami, on November 3, 2008 confirmed that the essay accurately expressed his views on the war and Japan's role in it. He had already written a similar essay in May 2007 for an ASDF internal publication.

On 13 November, prime minister Tarō Asō said Tamogami decision's to write this essay was "extremely inappropriate" and the government was wrong in having overlooked Tamogami's views for many years.

The essay that led to Tamogami's dismissal had been solicited for a writing contest organized and sponsored by his friend, prominent businessman and nationalist Toshio Motoya, under the theme "True Interpretation of Modern History." Motoya and the other judges, including Shoichi Watabe, an honorary professor at Sophia University, awarded Tamogami the competition's ¥3 million first prize. The piece later appeared in a book published by Motoya, "The Shocking Truth About Modern History," which also featured other essays entered in the competition.

Tamogami was demoted to lieutenant general upon removal from his position as chief of staff on October 31. He retired from the JASDF on November 3, 2008, having reached the mandatory retirement age for his lower rank.

== Political career ==
Since retiring from the Air Self-Defense Force, General Tamogami has become involved with Japanese nationalist groups, heading Ganbare Nippon at its founding in February 2010. He also wrote a column for the magazine Asahi Geino, in which he opined on topics such as the Chinese and North Korean military threats and the benefits of corporal punishment.

In a 2011 book, he spelled out a more independent defense policy for Japan under which Japan would have the right to collective self-defense and would acquire nuclear weapons, aircraft carriers, bombers and cruise missiles, as well as enhancing its amphibious troops and intelligence-gathering capabilities.

He organized a rally to protest the Senkaku Islands incident where a Chinese fishing trawler collided with two Japanese Coast Guard patrol boats. At the anti-China rally, he said: "Senkaku Islands is Japan's traditional territory, if we don't protect it, China will make action to take it." In August 2012, he helped lead a group of Japanese activists to the Senkaku Islands to protest a landing on the islands days earlier by Chinese activists.

In the wake of a rape incident by American servicemen in Okinawa in October 2012, he pointed out in a Twitter post that both recent rape incidents had occurred around 4 am, and asked why the media had not questioned what the victims were doing walking around town at that time.

He announced his candidacy for governor of Tokyo in 2014 in the election to replace resigning governor Naoki Inose. Although Tamogami obtained 610,865 votes, he lost to former Minister of Health, Labour and Welfare Yōichi Masuzoe, who obtained more than 2.1 million votes.

In the 2014 general election he ran as a candidate for the Party for Future Generations but was not elected. As of 2015 he was no longer the head of this organization.

=== Arrest and trial ===
Tamogami and his campaign finance director were arrested in April 2016 on charges that Tamogami's gubernatorial campaign paid 2.8 million yen to five staffers who were legally classified as volunteers. Prior to his arrest (but after the charges became public), Tamogami explained the payments as "not something that I directly ordered, but [a] result of my ignorance and lack of oversight."

Tamogami pled not guilty in June 2016, stating that "I was never involved in distributing the money, nor did I conspire to do so." Prosecutors alleged that Tamogami approved the distribution of surplus cash remaining at the end of his campaign, and specifically instructed his finance director to increase payments to certain individuals.

In May 2017, a district court sentenced Tamogami to 22 months in prison, suspended for five years, for making illegal payments to his campaign staff in his unsuccessful Tokyo gubernatorial bid in February 2014.

== Controversies ==
Tamogami is controversial for his historiography of the Second Sino-Japanese War and World War II. He has been described as a "champion of Japan's right wing". He denies that women were forced into sexual service as "comfort women". He also denies the Nanjing Massacre.

== Medals ==
- Legion of Merit Degree Commander Medal

== Humor ==
Tamogami is known for making jokes, particularly about his own diminutive stature. When criticized for his outspoken remarks he countered that "he did not lack prudence (shinchō (慎重)) of speech, only of height (shinchō (身長))", and when commenting on defense spending cuts, he said of his own appointment, "The slimming down of the self defense forces has begun, with the appointment of a more compact Chief of Staff." When criticized for accepting severance pay after the scandal caused by his essay, he quipped, "Well, at last my wife and children are giving me hot food again." During the 2014 gubernatorial campaign, he said "although I make this face, I am actually a good person."

Military offices
Preceded by Tadashi Yoshida	Chief of Staff Japan Air Self Defense Force; 2007 - 2008	Succeeded by Kenichiro Hokazono
