= Haken =

Haken may refer to:

- Haken (band), an English progressive metal band
- Haken (employment), a type of labor contract in Japan
- Haken manifold, a type of 3-manifold named after Wolfgang Haken
- Eduard Haken (1910–1996), Czech operatic bass
- Hermann Haken (1927-2024), physicist known for his contributions to laser theory and Synergetics
- Rianne ten Haken (born 1986), Dutch model
- Wolfgang Haken (1928–2022), German mathematician
- Shiluach haken, a mitzvah in the Torah
