= Ieiri =

Ieiri (written: 家入) is a Japanese surname. Notable people with the surname include:

- Kazuma Ieiri (家入 一真; born 1978), Japanese internet entrepreneur
- Leo Ieiri (家入 レオ; born 1994), Japanese singer-songwriter

== Fictional characters ==
- Shiruku Ieiri (家入 しるく), a supporting character in Star Detective Precure!
- Shoko Ieiri (家入 硝子), a supporting character in Jujutsu Kaisen
