= 2011 Tokyo gubernatorial election =

Election for Governor of Tokyo

← 2007	April 10, 2011	2012 →
- Turnout: 57.8%
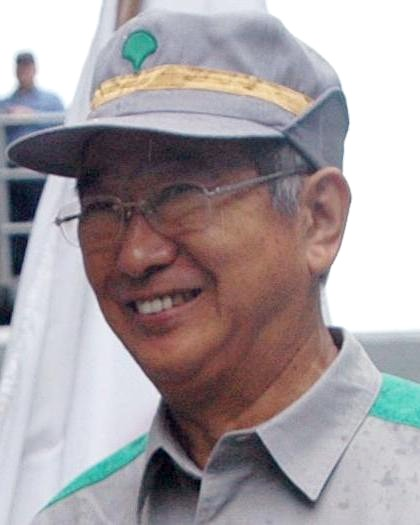

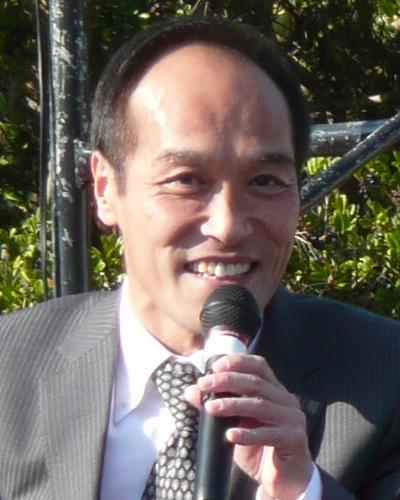

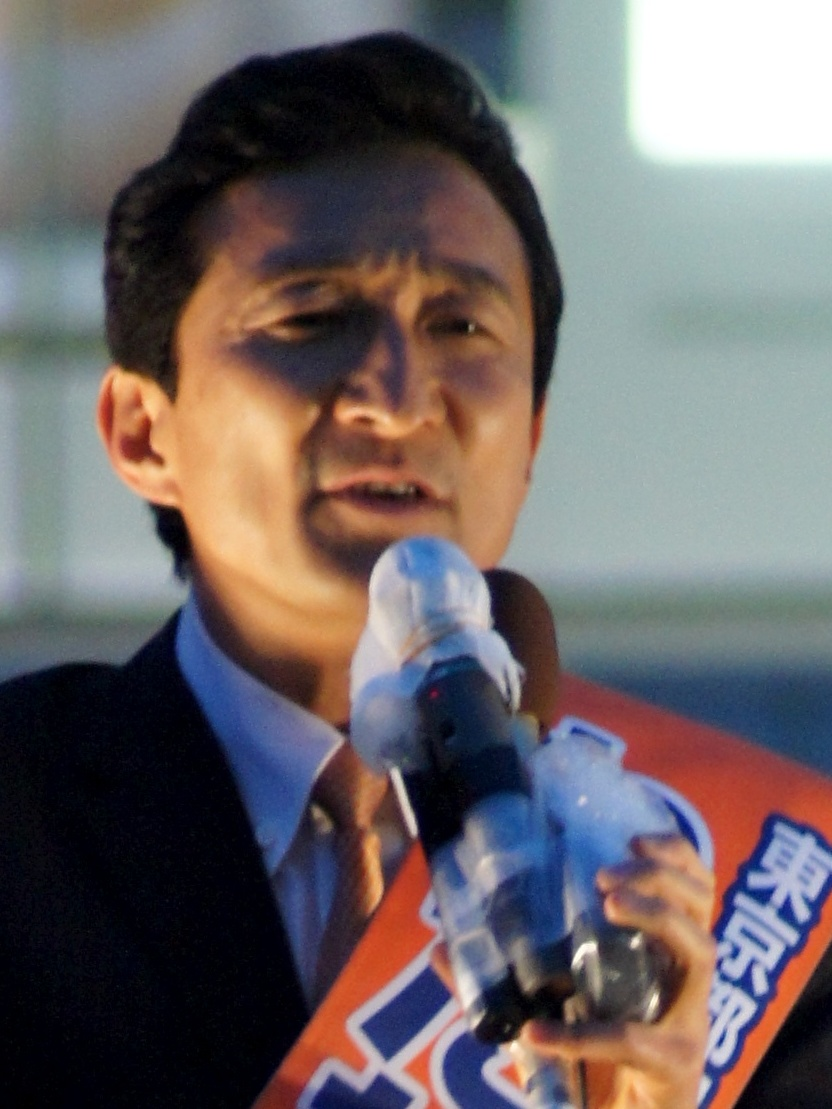
Candidate	Shintarō Ishihara	Hideo Higashikokubaru	Miki Watanabe
Party	Independent	Independent	Independent
Popular vote	2,615,120	1,690,669	1,013,132
Percentage	43.4%	28.1%	16.8%
Governor before election
Shintarō Ishihara
Independent
Elected Governor
Shintarō Ishihara
Independent

The 2011 Tokyo gubernatorial election was held on April 10, 2011 as part of the 17th unified local elections. There were eleven candidates.

The election occurred in the wake of the 2011 Tohoku earthquake and tsunami and Fukushima nuclear disaster, which occurred on the first day of the campaign. Incumbent governor Shintaro Ishihara entered the race after initially indicating that he would retire, with a platform of supporting the tsunami disaster areas and bidding for the 2020 Summer Olympics. Kanagawa governor Shigefumi Matsuzawa, who had been a prominent candidate at the start of the campaign, left the race on March 15 and threw his support behind Ishihara, arguing that both men needed to stay with their governments through the wake of the disasters. Ishihara remained in the lead in polls through voting day, despite a prominent gaffe in which he characterized the disasters as "divine punishment" for "egoism" in Japanese society. His victory was owed in large part to his crisis management presence following the disasters, such as drinking Tokyo tap water on camera in order to demonstrate that it was safe from radiation.

Gubernatorial election 2011: Tokyo
Party	Candidate	Votes	%	±%
LDP, New Komeito	Shintarō Ishihara (incumbent)	2,615,120	43.4%	−7.7%
Independent	Hideo Higashikokubaru	1,690,669	28.1%	
Independent	Miki Watanabe	1,013,132	16.8%	
JCP	Akira Koike	623,913	10.4%	
Independent	Yoshiro Nakamatsu	48,672	0.8%	−0.8%
Independent	Yujirō Taniyama	10,300	0.2%	
Independent	Keigo Furukawa	6,389	0.1%	
Independent	Ken Sugita	5,475	0.1%	
Smile Party	Mac Akasaka	4,598	0.1%	
Tokyo Restoration Party	Osamu Ogami	3,793	0.1%	
Peace and Nuclear Disarmament Party	Kenji Himeji	3,278	0.1%	
Turnout		6,072,604	57.8%	+3.5%
