= 2014 Tokyo gubernatorial election =

Election for Governor of Tokyo

- 9 February 2014
- Turnout: 46.14% ▼16.46 pp
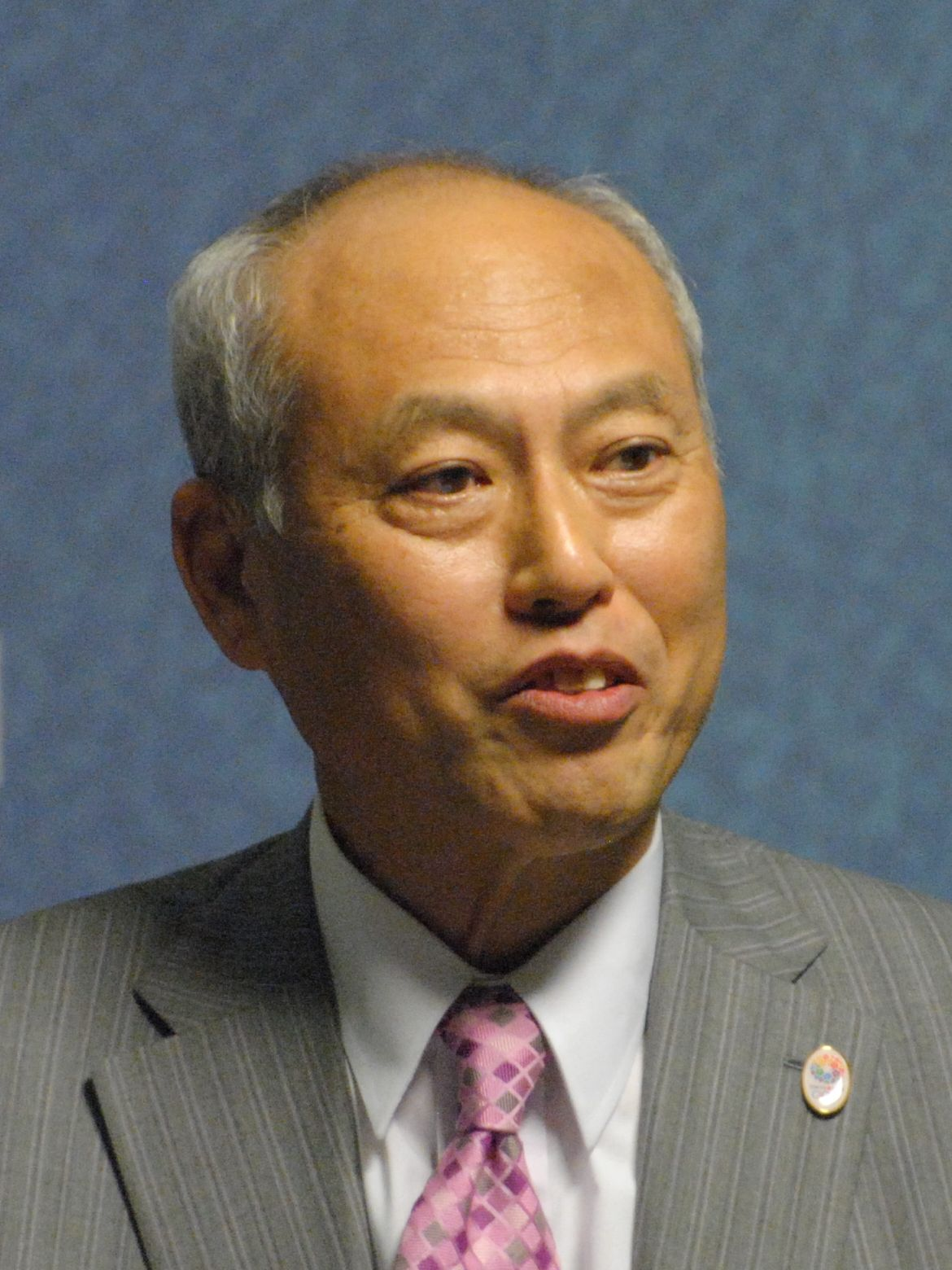

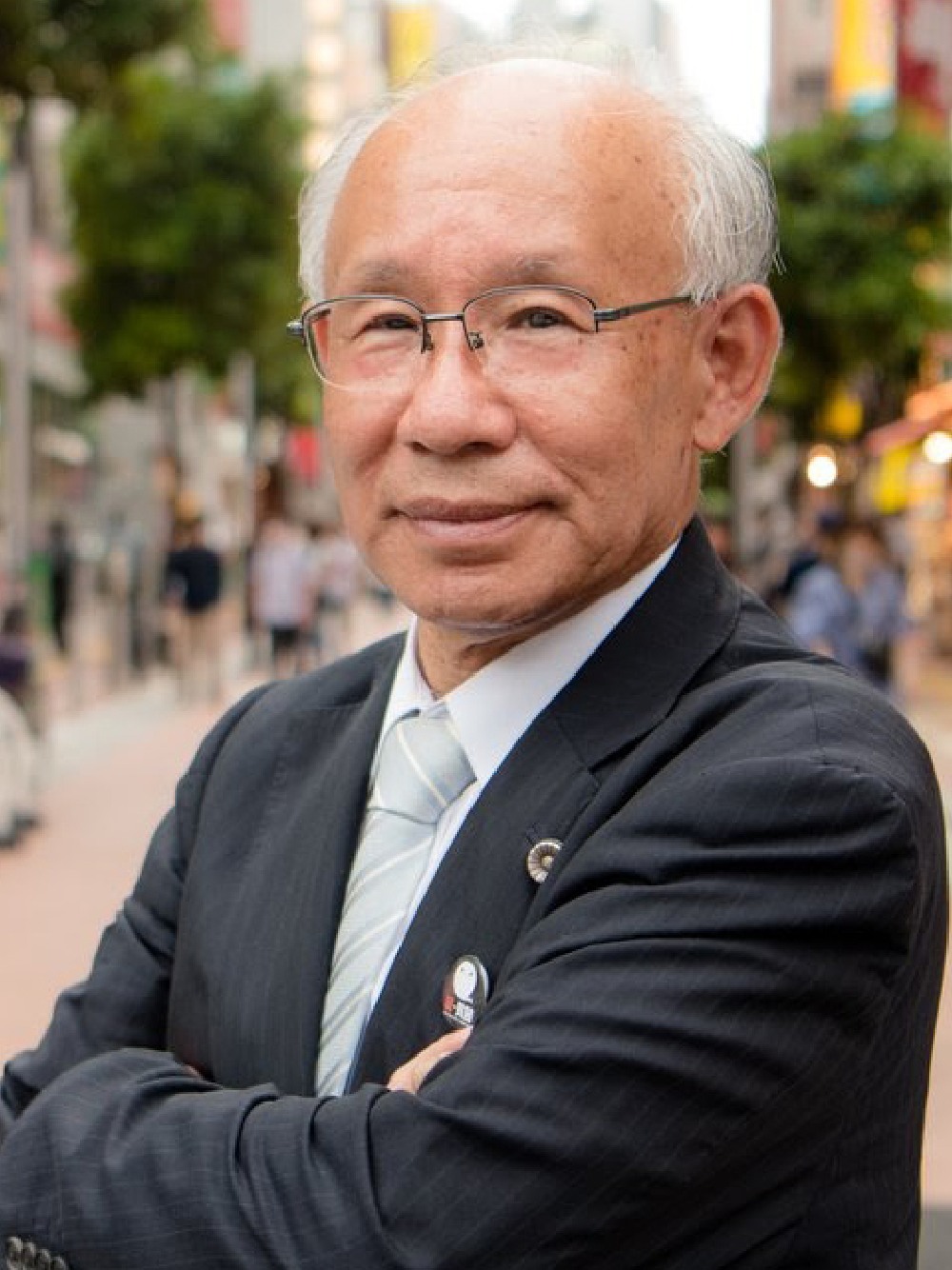

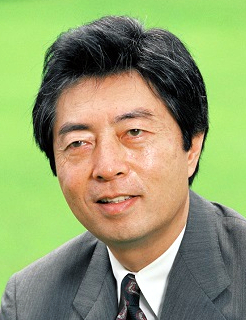

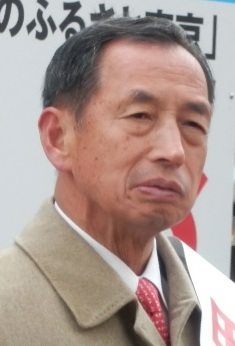
Candidate	Yōichi Masuzoe	Kenji Utsunomiya
Party	Independent	Independent
Popular vote	2,112,979	982,595
Percentage	42.86%	19.93%
Supported by	LDP, NK	JCP, SDP, GJ
Candidate	Morihiro Hosokawa	Toshio Tamogami
Party	Independent	Independent
Popular vote	956,063	610,865
Percentage	19.39%	12.39%
Supported by	DPJ, PLP, UP	ISS
- Election results by municipalities.
Governor before election
Naoki Inose
Independent
Elected Governor
Yoichi Masuzoe
Independent

The 2014 Tokyo gubernatorial election took place on February 9, 2014 to replace outgoing Governor Naoki Inose, who resigned effective December 24, 2013. Yōichi Masuzoe was declared the winner in exit polling, with a substantial lead over the fifteen other candidates. His final tally was 2,112,979 votes (42.86%), with his two closest competitors Morihiro Hosokawa and Kenji Utsunomiya failing to break the 20% mark. Total turnout was 4,930,251 (46.14%), significantly lower than the 62.6% turnout in the 2012 election.

== Background ==
Tokyo governor Naoki Inose abruptly resigned in December 2013 following a month-long investigation into a political funds scandal. His resignation came in the midst of various preparations for the 2020 Summer Olympics, which had been awarded to Tokyo earlier in the year, including the formation of an organization committee (due by February 2014), the allocation of 10.3 billion yen in Olympics-related funding, and negotiation with the national government over the construction of the new National Olympic Stadium.

The election campaign was set to officially begin on January 23, 2014 and was one of three critical electoral tests for the ruling Liberal Democratic Party in early 2014, along with the January 19 mayoral election in Nago, Okinawa (widely viewed as a referendum on the relocation plan of Marine Corps Air Station Futenma), in which the incumbent mayor, who is against the plan, was re-elected, and the late February gubernatorial election in Yamaguchi Prefecture.

Yoichi Masuzoe was initially seen as the strongest candidate in the race due to his popularity and support from the LDP. In mid-January, former Prime Minister Morihiro Hosokawa emerged as a second strong candidate with the backing of former LDP Prime Minister Junichirō Koizumi, with his platform focusing on opposition to the restart of nuclear power generation in Japan. Prime Minister Shinzō Abe stated his concern that the campaign would focus on the nuclear issue at the expense of other issues. Masuzoe, who supported a gradual phase-out of nuclear power, stated that "choosing the Tokyo governor based (solely) on whether they favor or oppose nuclear power seems odd." Masuzoe was endorsed by the LDP and Komeito, while Hosokawa was endorsed by the Democratic Party of Japan, People's Life Party and Unity Party (Japan), and the Social Democratic Party of Japan and Japanese Communist Party endorsed former Japan Federation of Bar Associations president Kenji Utsunomiya.

There were 10.8 million eligible voters, a new all-time high. Of these, 7.4 million lived in special wards, 3.3 million in cities, less than 0.1 million in the towns and villages in West Tama and on the islands. In the first three days of early voting (possible from the day after the official campaign start), turnout increased tenfold compared to the same period in the previous gubernatorial election of 2012; but in 2012, the national House of Representatives election was held together with the gubernatorial election, and the legal campaign period for Representatives elections is twelve days – five days less than in elections for prefectural governors, so many early voters in 2012 waited until the official start of the lower house campaign to cast their ballots in both elections. Compared to the 2011 gubernatorial election when no national election was held simultaneously, turnout in the first three days of early voting increased by 60%. A blizzard struck eastern Japan on the day before the election, bringing the most snow seen in Tokyo in two decades. Residual snow on the streets impacted voter turnout on election day.

On the remote island of Haha-jima in Ogasawara village, the election was held one day earlier than in the rest of Tokyo (kuriage-tōhyō), i.e. the election day is February 8.

== Polling ==
A poll conducted shortly after Hosokawa's announcement, as reported by the Sankei-affiliated news site ZAKZAK, showed that 40% of Tokyo voters supported Masuzoe, 16% supported Hosokawa, 15% supported Utsunomiya and 6% supported Tamogami. Masuzoe maintained the lead over Hosokawa, Utsunomiya and Tamogami in four separate polls conducted January 23–24 by Mainichi Shimbun, Kyodo News, Sankei Shimbun and Fuji Television. This ranking remained unchanged in a February 1–2 polling by Mainichi, although 30% of voters remained undecided. These outlets refrained from disclosing actual poll numbers in order to comply with Japanese election laws.

An electoral simulation by the LDP in January, as reported by the weekly magazine Shukan Post, resulted in 42% voting for Hosokawa, 39% for Masuzoe, 10% for Utsunomiya and 7% for Tamogami, assuming a typical turnout of their respective supporting bases (around 55% of the total electorate), with the caveat that a large turnout by anti-nuclear supporters could tip the balance further against Masuzoe.

== Result ==
Tokyo gubernatorial election, 2014
Party	Candidate	Votes	%	±%
Independent (Supported by Liberal Democratic, Komeito)	Yoichi Masuzoe	2,112,979	42.86%	N/A
Independent (Supported by Social Democratic, Communist)	Kenji Utsunomiya	982,595	19.93%	▲5.35%
Independent (Supported by Democrats, People's Life, and Unity)	Morihiro Hosokawa	956,063	19.39%	N/A
Independent	Toshio Tamogami	610,865	12.39%	N/A
Independent	Kazuma Ieiri	88,936	1.8%	N/A
Independent	Yoshiro Nakamatsu	64,774	1.31%	▼0.64%
Smile Party	Mac Akasaka	15,070	0.31%	▼0.27%
Turnout		4,930,251	46.14%	▼16.46%

Kenji Himeji, Masaichi Igarashi, Hiroshi Kaneko, Chikanori Matsuyama, Tomoharu Nakagawa, Hisao Naito, Takashi Negami, Eiichi Sato and Tatsuo Suzuki also appeared on the ballot but won less than 5,000 votes each. 1.24% of votes were invalid.

Exit polls by the Asahi Shimbun found that Masuzoe was the most popular candidate in each age segment but had particularly strong support from elderly voters, winning 55% of voters in the 70+ age range versus 36% of voters in their twenties and 38% of voters in their thirties. Tamogami polled strongest among voters in their twenties, gaining 24% of the vote in this age range, but his support among voters in the 60+ age range was in single digits. Hosokawa was second-ranked among voters in their forties, fifties and sixties while Utsunomiya was second-ranked among voters in their thirties and seventies.

Voter turnout was highest in the remote island villages of Mikurajima (80.16%) and Aogashima (75.00%), and lowest in the western suburb of Mizuho (35.61%).

== Candidates ==
There were sixteen candidates in the race, fifteen of whom ran as independents (Mac Akasaka was the only candidate claiming a party affiliation).

- Yoichi Masuzoe, former Health and Welfare Minister, entered the race as an independent with the support of the Liberal Democratic Party and Komeito. he also enjoys widespread support within the Democratic Party of Japan and was endorsed by the Tokyo chapter of RENGO. The DPJ considered backing Masuzoe instead of standing their own candidate; the LDP was highly critical of Masuzoe for leaving the LDP in 2010 to start his own party, but backed him "because there was no other candidate that could win". Shigeru Uchida, head of the LDP delegation in the Tokyo metropolitan assembly, had urged the party to avoid endorsing another "celebrity candidate", expressing a preference for a candidate with administrative experience, while Prime Minister and LDP President Shinzō Abe said he emphasized name recognition. Voices within the party supported Masuzoe as a compromise between both considerations. The LDP national executive declared three criteria for adoption as its candidate in the race as: (i) an international outlook; (ii) an ardent supporter of the Tokyo 2020 Games; and iii) capability to have a trustworthy relationship with the Tokyo Metropolitan Assembly. He was previously a candidate in the 1999 gubernatorial election, where he won over 830,000 votes.
- Kenji Utsunomiya, an attorney who came in second behind Inose in the 2012 gubernatorial election, was the first person to formally declare his candidacy, and called for providing a check against Prime Minister Shinzō Abe, closing all nuclear plants, restricting spending on the Olympics and making Tokyo "a secure city where people can live and work". After the emergence of Hosokawa's candidacy, former Prime Minister Naoto Kan called on Utsunomiya to leave the race out of fears that he would split the anti-nuclear vote in Tokyo. Utsunomiya stated that he would like to have an in-depth policy discussion with Hosokawa but would not back down from his campaign.

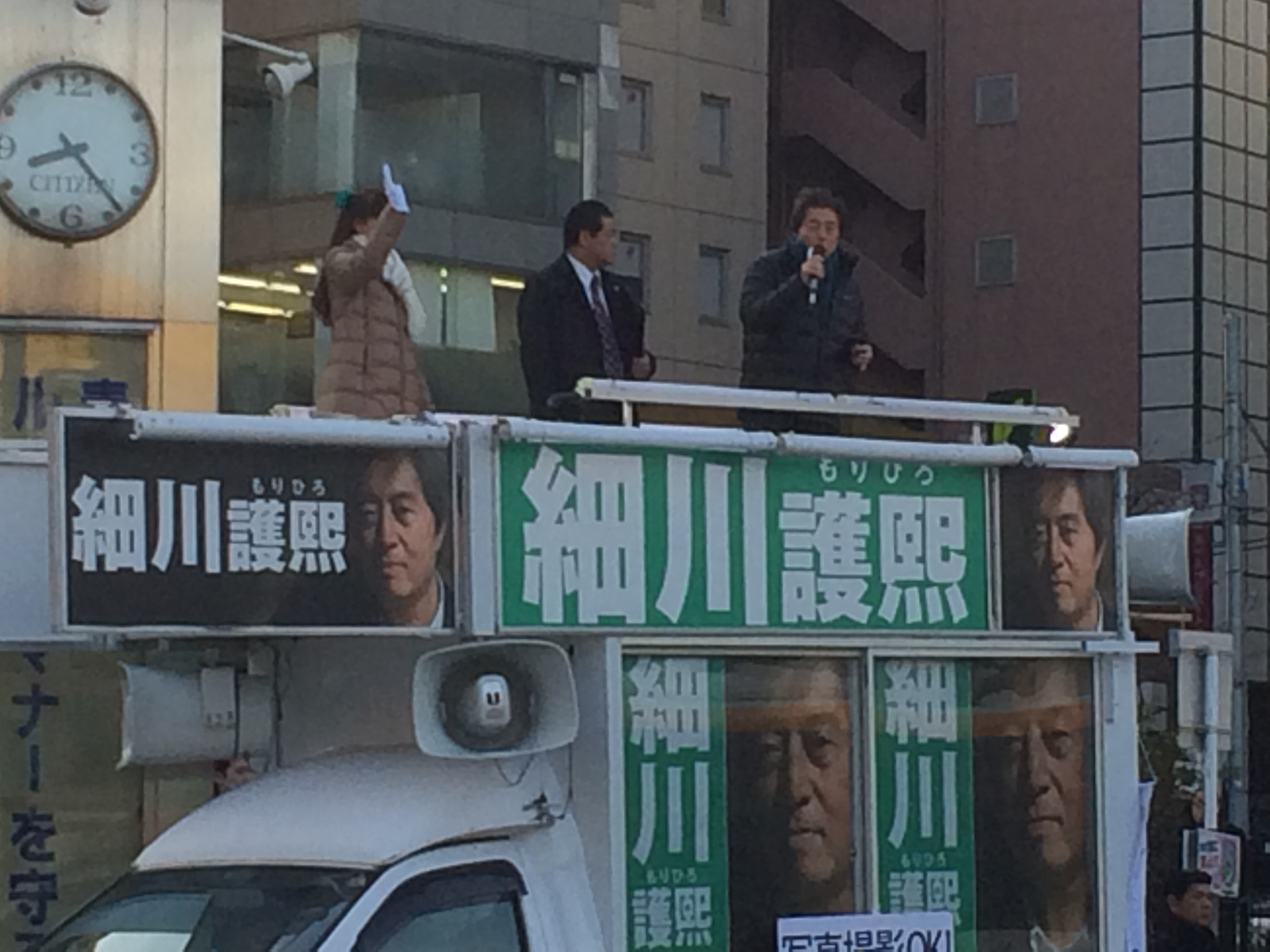
Morihiro Hosokawa campaigning from a speaker truck at Takadanobaba Station, February 7

- Morihiro Hosokawa, former Prime Minister, decided to run on a platform of eliminating nuclear power in Japan, reducing energy consumption and overhauling the welfare system. Former LDP Prime Minister Junichiro Koizumi reportedly pressed Hosokawa to run on an anti-nuclear platform, and stood next to Hosokawa as he announced his candidacy. Although Tokyoites were overwhelmingly in favor of a phase-out of nuclear power, Hosokawa's age (76 at the time of the election) and minimal contact with Tokyo, as well as the circumstances surrounding his resignation as prime minister in 1994, were potential clouds to his candidacy.
- Toshio Tamogami, retired General and former Chief of Staff of the Japan Air Self-Defense Force, entered the race as an independent with the support of former Governor Shintaro Ishihara and several other members of the Japan Restoration Party (although not the party itself.) He was previously approached by the Liberal Democratic Party to run in the 2010 House of Councillors election but turned down their request. His platform calls for strengthening disaster countermeasures in Tokyo through cooperation with the SDF. He is known as a nationalist figure, arguing that Japan was not an aggressor during World War II and supporting official visits to Yasukuni Shrine; his views led to his removal as JASDF Chief of Staff in 2008.
- Kazuma Ieiri, founder of several internet start-up companies, announced his candidacy after soliciting 1,000 retweets on Twitter. He proposed an open platform for citizens to decide policy for the Tokyo government.
- Yoshiro Nakamatsu, a celebrity inventor and perennial candidate popularly known as Dr. NakaMats, entered the race as an independent. The 2014 election is his seventh campaign for governor of Tokyo.
- Mac Akasaka, perennial candidate and leader of the Smile Party, announced he would enter the race after an outpouring of comments on Twitter urging him to run. He previously ran in the 2012 gubernatorial election.

=== Others considered to be candidates ===
The LDP considered a number of candidates prior to endorsing Masuzoe, conducting a private telephone poll in December 2013 which named Masuzoe, former TV comedian and Miyazaki Prefecture governor Hideo Higashikokubaru and LDP legislators Nobuteru Ishihara, Satsuki Katayama, Yuriko Koike and Tamayo Marukawa. Higashikokubaru came in second to Masuzoe, but on January 10 he stated that he had "2,000%" "no scheme, plan, or intention" to run. Hakubun Shimomura and Seiko Hashimoto were also rumored to be potential LDP candidates, but were excluded from consideration by the party due to existing duties related to the 2020 Summer Olympics and 2014 Winter Olympics respectively. Akira Ikegami, a television journalist, was also included in the LDP poll, but said that he had no interest in running and that he had already agreed to cover the election for the Tokyo MX television station. Hiroshi Sato, former Vice Governor of Tokyo, was approached by LDP lawmakers in the Tokyo metropolitan assembly but declined to run.

Saburō Kawabuchi, former head coach of the Japan national football team, was reported in December 2013 to be a compromise candidate between Prime Minister Shinzō Abe and former Governor Shintaro Ishihara, with his athletic background being viewed as an advantage in the run-up to the Tokyo Olympics. Abe and Ishihara eventually endorsed Masuzoe and Tamogami respectively.

The DPJ approached baseball player Atsuya Furuta and journalist Shuntaro Torigoe, both of whom refused to run. Renhō Murata, former State Minister of Government Revitalization, was widely viewed as a likely candidate from the DPJ.

Antonio Inoki, a professional wrestler and Diet member, was reportedly considering announcing his candidacy. He had been suspended from the Japan Restoration Party following an unauthorized November 2013 visit to North Korea, and was reportedly planning to decide whether to resign from the Diet to run for governor following his return from a second visit to North Korea in January 2014.

Junichirō Koizumi, former Prime Minister and nuclear power critic, declined to run after reportedly being approached by Yoshimi Watanabe of Your Party.

Setsuo Yamaguchi, a real estate appraiser and head of a political organization, planned to run on a platform of revising the plans for rebuilding the National Olympic Stadium. This would be his third run for governor of Tokyo, his last appearance being in the 2007 election in which he received 0.06% of the total votes cast. He withdrew from the race on January 8 citing a lack of funds. Shigenobu Yoshida, former Japanese ambassador to Nepal, also briefly entered the race as an independent on a platform of reducing the budget for the Olympics. He previously ran in the 2012 election in which he received 1.23% of the total votes cast.
