= Yōichi Masuzoe =

Japanese politician

- 舛添 要一
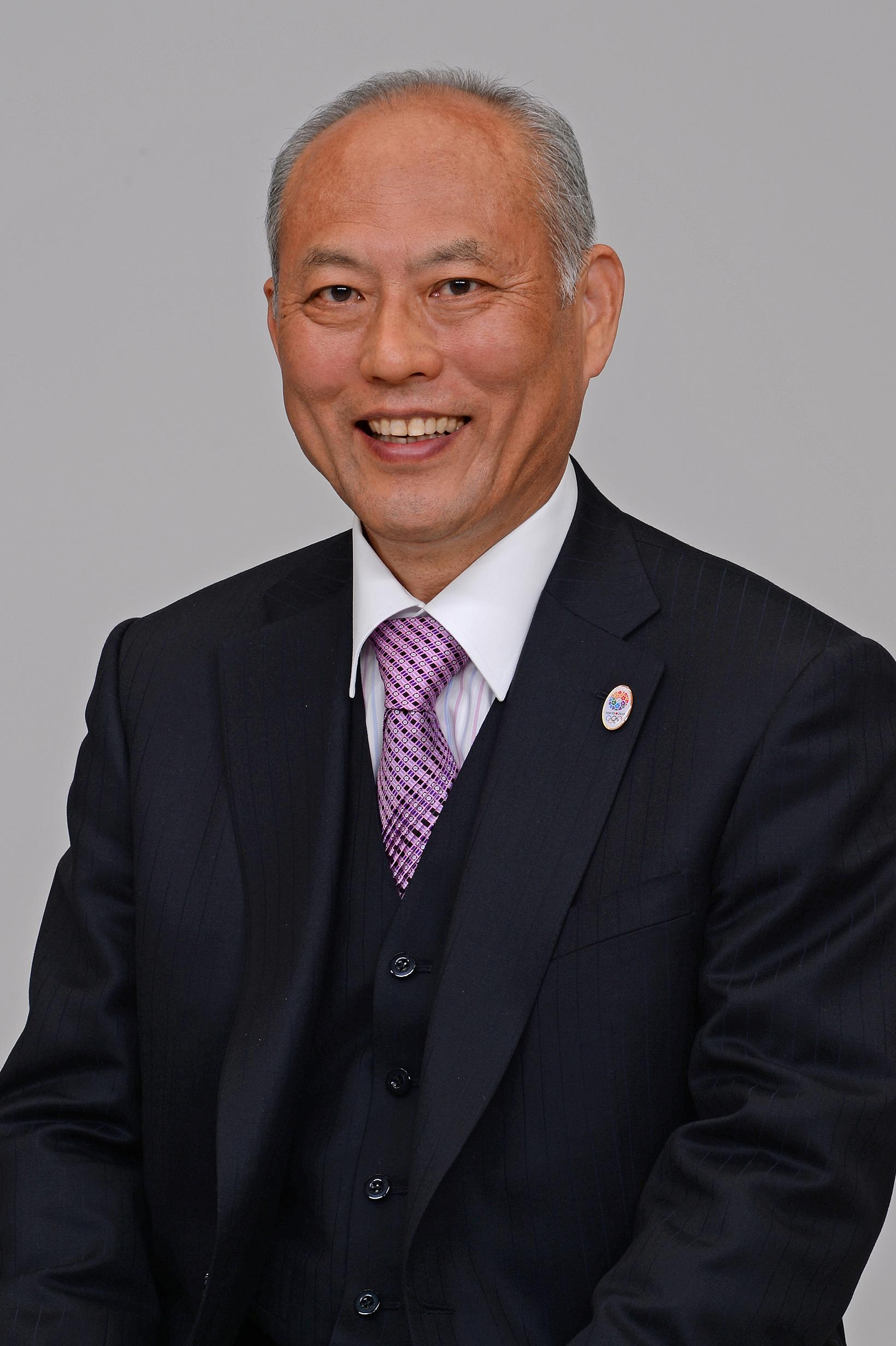
- Official portrait, 2014

Governor of Tokyo
- In office 9 February 2014 – 21 June 2016
- Monarch: Akihito
- Preceded by: Naoki Inose
- Succeeded by: Yuriko Koike

President of the New Renaissance Party
- In office 23 April 2010 – 22 July 2013
- Preceded by: Hideo Watanabe
- Succeeded by: Hiroyuki Arai

Minister of Health, Labour, and Welfare
- In office 27 August 2007 – 16 September 2009
- Prime Minister: Shinzo Abe; Yasuo Fukuda; Tarō Asō
- Preceded by: Hakuo Yanagisawa
- Succeeded by: Akira Nagatsuma

Member of the House of Councillors
- In office 29 July 2001 – 28 July 2013
- Constituency: National PR

Personal details
- Born: 29 November 1948 (age 77) Kitakyushu, Fukuoka, Japan
- Party: Independent (since 2013)
- Other political affiliations: LDP (2001–2010); NRP (2010–2013)
- Spouse: Satsuki Tomonaga (m. 1986; div. 1989)
- Children: 5
- Education: University of Tokyo; Graduate Institute of International and Development Studies

Yōichi Masuzoe (舛添 要一, Masuzoe Yōichi; born 29 November 1948) is a Japanese politician who was elected to the position of governor of Tokyo in 2014 and resigned in June 2016 due to the misuse of public funds. He was previously a member of the Japanese House of Councillors and served as the Minister of Health, Labour, and Welfare. Before entering politics, he became well known in Japan as a television commentator on political issues.

== Early life ==
Masuzoe was born in Kitakyushu in Fukuoka Prefecture on 29 November 1948. He graduated from Yahata High School in 1967 and entered the Faculty of Law at the University of Tokyo, where he majored in law, politics and history. He is conversationally fluent in English and French.

Masuzoe was an academic assistant at the University of Tokyo from 1971, and later spent several years in Europe as a research fellow at the University of Paris (1973–75) and the Graduate Institute of International Studies in Geneva (1976–78). He was an assistant professor at the University of Tokyo from 1979 to 1989. After leaving the university in 1989, he established the Masuzoe Institute of Political Economy. He became known as a frequent guest on political talk shows in Japan, particularly the popular TV Tackle program hosted by Takeshi Kitano.

While continuing his writing and consulting on foreign affairs, Masuzoe relocated from Tokyo to Kitakyushu in the 1990s to take care of his aging mother, who began to show signs of deteriorating mental health. In 1998, he published a book entitled When I Put a Diaper on My Mother, which details his experience caring for his mother and the obstacles imposed by the Japanese welfare system. The book sold 100,000 copies, more than any of his previous political works, and propelled Masuzoe into the national spotlight as an authority on the aging society in Japan.

== Legislative career ==
=== Liberal Democratic Party ===
Masuzoe ran for Governor of Tokyo in the 1999 election, placing third among nineteen candidates (behind Shintaro Ishihara and Kunio Hatoyama).

He won his first National Diet seat in the Upper House in 2001 with the largest number of ballots in the national proportional representation section of the House of Councilors. His main election promise was to change the Bank of Japan's policies by reforming the Bank of Japan Law. However, in May 2001 the book Princes of the Yen (『円の支配者』) on the Bank of Japan, by Richard Werner, became a number one general bestseller, and Masuzoe agreed with its conclusion that to end the recession and avoid future banking disasters and credit-driven boom-bust cycles, the Bank of Japan Law had to change to make the central bank more accountable for its policies. Masuzoe won with a landslide victory – presaging the same platform, policy recommendation and landslide victory enjoyed by Shinzō Abe in the election that was to make him prime minister in late 2012. After his victory in 2001, Masuzoe duly formed the LDP BoJ Law Reform Group and appointed Professor Werner as its advisor. It included the members of the Lower House Yoshimi Watanabe and Kozo Yamamoto, among others.

In 2006, he was named deputy director general of an LDP committee charged with redrafting the Constitution of Japan. In this role, he argued that Article 9 of the Constitution of Japan, which prohibits Japan from maintaining warmaking potential, was increasingly disjoined from the reality of Japan's defense arrangements, and should be revised to allow the Japan Self-Defense Forces to have the status of a military.

In August 2007, Masuzoe was appointed as Minister of Health, Labour and Welfare. He served in this position until 2009 under three consecutive prime ministers (Shinzō Abe, Yasuo Fukuda and Tarō Asō). Abe reportedly appointed Masuzoe, a frequent critic of Abe's policies, to silence critics who would call him a factionalist. Masuzoe came under fire during his tenure for an incident in which the government failed to match 50 million pension records with their owners, which led Democratic Party of Japan head Ichirō Ozawa to call for Masuzoe's censure if he did not apologize.

As MHLW minister, Masuzoe was the first Japanese government official to set forth a timetable for the settlement of lawsuits against the state for hepatitis C infections caused by tainted blood transfusions, and started an internal investigation regarding the ministry's previous responses to the issue. The plaintiffs rejected his settlement proposal in December 2007, which placed strain on the Fukuda government's approval ratings.

Masuzoe set up a study group within the LDP in early 2010 to study economic reforms similar to those begun by Prime Minister Junichirō Koizumi.

=== New Renaissance Party ===
By early 2010, Masuzoe had become an extremely popular political figure, with opinion polls suggesting that he was the public's most favored prime ministerial candidate by a wide margin. In a Kyodo News poll in March 2010, 23.7% of respondents named him as the best candidate for prime minister, compared to only 8.3% who chose second-ranked incumbent prime minister Yukio Hatoyama. The Liberal Democratic Party at the same time had incurred a massive general election defeat in August 2009, and its approval ratings continued to plummet following the election of Sadakazu Tanigaki as party president in September 2009.

In April 2010, Masuzoe left the LDP and formed a splinter group called New Renaissance Party (Shintō Kaikaku). The party's platform included a call for decentralization, deregulation, and a halving of the number of Diet members. At the time, The Economist's Banyan column dubbed Masuzoe "Japan's most popular politician". Both the NRP and Your Party, led by ex-LDP lawmaker Yoshimi Watanabe, were viewed at the time as potentially effective center-right counterweights to the Democratic Party of Japan, and possibly even successors to the LDP itself. Masuzoe's party nonetheless gained minimal traction. Four of its initial six Upper House members were voted out in the July 2010 election, leaving the party with only Masuzoe and Hiroyuki Arai representing it in the Upper House; the NRP was ultimately overshadowed by Your Party as a reformist element.

LDP secretary-general Nobuteru Ishihara indicated in October 2010 that Masuzoe would run as a candidate in the 2011 Tokyo gubernatorial election, which Masuzoe emphatically denied, stating that he would serve out the remainder of his term in the House of Councillors. In December 2010, he met with Ichirō Ozawa, Yukio Hatoyama and Kunio Hatoyama, reportedly to discuss a potential political realignment within the ruling Democratic Party of Japan following the resignation of Chief Cabinet Secretary Yoshito Sengoku. He continued to be critical of the DPJ administration under Naoto Kan in the wake of the 2011 Fukushima Daiichi nuclear disaster, saying that "the government has failed to disclose information thoroughly and, secondly, it has created a confusing array of committees and organizations".

Masuzoe made efforts in foreign relations as head of the NRP. He met with Chinese state councilor Dai Bingguo in March 2011 following the resignation of Foreign Minister Seiji Maehara to reassure the Chinese government about Japan's stability. He traveled to Taiwan in October 2011 as part of a trilateral security dialogue between Taiwan, Japan and the United States, and met with Tang Jiaxuan in Beijing in April 2013 as part of an effort to improve strained Sino-Japanese relations following the nationalization of the Senkaku Islands.

Masuzoe was reportedly considered for a cabinet position under Prime Minister Yoshihiko Noda in January 2012, but was passed over. On 18 January, he dissolved his alliance with the Sunrise Party of Japan led by Takeo Hiranuma. Later that month, the Asahi Shimbun proclaimed that he had "dropped off the political radar".

In a September 2012 column, Masuzoe was critical of Prime Minister Yoshihiko Noda's "succession of failures on both the domestic and foreign policy fronts", and was also critical of incoming LDP president Shinzō Abe, writing: "Wariness of Abe on the Korean and Chinese sides would make an improvement in relations increasingly difficult. If he shows an excessively right-wing bent when dealing with reform to the Constitution, he will no longer be able to garner support from the majority of the Japanese people." He held out hope that dissatisfaction with the DPJ and LDP would boost third parties in the 2012 general election, writing that "the dysfunction within the DPJ, and the lack of any impetus for internal reform in the LDP, is forcing the electorate to seriously consider supporting political forces outside the traditional two-party structure".

During the 2012 election race, Masuzoe expressed opposition to the consumption tax increase implemented by the DPJ, and argued in favor of deregulation and reducing corporate taxes, as well as implementation of a dōshūsei federal system. He openly considered leaving the House of Councillors to run for governor of Tokyo in the 2012 gubernatorial election at the behest of DPJ legislators in the metropolitan assembly, and also considered running for the House of Representatives in the general election.

Following the resounding victory of Abe and the LDP in the general election, Masuzoe announced in June 2013 that he would not stand for re-election in the July 2013 House of Councillors election, stating, "I have done the best I could for nearly three years, but I was unable to boost [the party's] strength."

== Governor of Tokyo ==
With Shinzō Abe (at the Prime Minister's Official Residence on 26 February 2014)

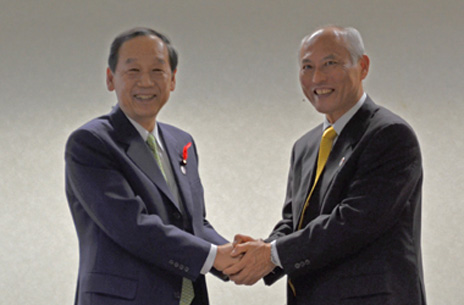
With Shun'ichi Yamaguchi (at the Headquarters of the National Institute of Information and Communications Technology 22 October 2014)

Masuzoe was considered by both the Liberal Democratic Party and Democratic Party of Japan as a potential candidate for the 2014 gubernatorial election in Tokyo. In a December 2013 LDP poll, he reportedly had the strongest support among a broad field of potential candidates. The party was divided with regard to candidate selection, with local LDP lawmakers seeking an experienced candidate and the central party leadership seeking a candidate with name recognition; Masuzoe was viewed as a compromise between these two requirements, even though he was no longer a member of the LDP.

Masuzoe ran as an independent with LDP support, as part of which he resigned from the New Renaissance Party and entered into a policy pact with the LDP. His platform focused on successfully holding the 2020 Summer Olympics and enhancing social security and disaster prevention measures. Chief Cabinet Secretary Yoshihide Suga of the LDP stated that Masuzoe "made a great contribution as a state minister to the management of health, welfare and labor issues", while Jin Matsubara of the DPJ stated that Masuzoe was "the right candidate to receive our support". Masuzoe attended a meeting of the Tokyo LDP in January 2014 and apologized for leaving the party in a bid to win their support.

Masuzoe led opinion polls through the final week of the campaign. His most prominent opponent, former opposition Prime Minister Morihiro Hosokawa, had the backing of the popular former LDP prime minister Jun'ichirō Koizumi. In a rare display of humor, Masuzoe dismissed a question as to whether the "tag team" of ex-prime ministers was intimidating, saying "I wouldn't care if they had a hundred prime ministers!" Hosokawa, as well as rival Kenji Utsunomiya, both made opposition to nuclear power a key issue in their campaigns, while Masuzoe, who supported a gradual phase-out of nuclear power, focused on social welfare issues. He ultimately won the election amid low voter turnout following a blizzard in Tokyo the previous day.

=== Resignation ===
In March 2016, the Tokyo Metropolitan Government released Masuzoe's overseas travel expenses for 2015, which came to 57 million yen. From March 2016, the Tokyo Metropolitan Assembly received a total of 610 telephone calls of complaint regarding Masuzoe's alleged extravagant spending. Then in May of that year, the Shukan Bunshun weekly news magazine reported on issues regarding public figures' official automobile travel expenses and the use of political funds for family trips. Masuzoe was the focus of the reports on the use of political funds for family trips, and came under prolonged media criticism. Masuzoe held a press conference that month to apologize for having declared over ¥370,000 spent on dining with his family at restaurants in 2013 and 2014 as "meeting-related" expenses covered by political funds. Among these were hotel expenses, family vacation trips, artwork, comic books as well as the use of government vehicle to travel to his holiday home located in Yugawara, Kanagawa Prefecture. In the following weeks investigations into his activities uncovered further inappropriate spending of public funds. An investigation instigated by Masuzoe and conducted by lawyers determined that he had used ¥4.4 million "inappropriately", but had not committed any crime. Masuzoe subsequently declared that he would refund the misappropriated expenses, but refused to resign over the issue.

Following the findings of the report and Masuzoe's admission, public discontent continued to rise in the first half of June 2016, with at least 70 per cent of Tokyo residents seeking his resignation. Masuzoe lost the support of his former backers, the LDP and Komeito parties, as they feared negative consequences in the national House of Councillors election to be held on 10 July and the Tokyo Metropolitan Assembly election the following year. On the afternoon of 15 June 2016, a no-confidence motion jointly submitted by all parties, including the LDP and Komeito, was to be voted upon in the Metropolitan Assembly. Despite publicly stating his refusal to step down the previous day, citing more time for public consideration, Masuzoe ultimately submitted his resignation effective 21 June to assembly president Shigeo Kawai on the morning of 15 June 2016. Another reason Masuzoe gave for seeking to delay his resignation was the pending Olympic Games in Rio, Brazil, which he was scheduled to attend as the representative of Tokyo, the host of the 2020 Summer Olympics. If the election of his replacement was held in July 2016, then the subsequent election would happen in July 2020, in the middle of the 2020 Tokyo Olympic Games.

== Views ==
In a 1996 Shokun article cited by SDP leader Mizuho Fukushima, Masuzoe argued that nuclear power is a fundamental component of national energy and defense policy and should not be influenced by local concerns: he asked "if 30,000 local residents can reject a national policy in a referendum, where and how are the other 125 million Japanese citizens supposed to manifest their own intentions?"

Fukushima also cited a 1989 article in which Masuzoe argued that women are "not fundamentally suited for politics"; that women lack the ability to compile parts into a logical whole, thus leading to single-issue politics; that women lack the physical strength to work 24 hours a day and make major decisions; and that their menstrual cycle leads them to be "abnormal" on a monthly basis and unsuitable for making major policy decisions such as whether to go to war.

Masuzoe, while Governor of Tokyo, is reported as having joined in general laughter in response to several taunts by male members of the Tokyo Metropolitan Assembly aimed at the female representative Ayaka Shiomura during a session of the Assembly on 18 June 2014. Shiomura was calling for more government assistance for women seeking to have children when she was met with heckles such as "You are the one who must get married as soon as possible" and "Can't you even bear a child?"

== Personal life ==
Masuzoe has married three times. His first marriage was to a French woman whom he met while studying in Europe; they divorced. He married Ministry of Finance bureaucrat Satsuki Katayama in 1986; they were divorced in 1989 and Katayama later became a member of the Diet. Masuzoe is known to have five children, three of which were born out of wedlock by two other women; one of his children, aged 25 as of 2014, is seriously disabled, and Masuzoe's negotiations with the child's mother over support payments drew attention in the Japanese tabloid press. Prime Minister Abe said that he wanted Katayama more than anyone else to stand in support of Masuzoe's 2014 gubernatorial bid, but Katayama responded that it was difficult for her to do so given the state of the negotiations. The magazine Nikkan Gendai reported in 2007 that Masuzoe held a wedding ceremony with another Japanese woman in France (but was not legally married to her) before marrying his first wife.

Masuzoe is a fan of horse racing, and owned several racehorses before entering politics. Two of his horses won the Tokyo Derby in 1997 and 1998 respectively.

Masuzoe lives in Setagaya, Tokyo, and has vacation homes in Yugawara and Lake Kawaguchi.

Political offices
Preceded by Naoki Inose	Governor of Tokyo; 2014–2016	Succeeded by Yuriko Koike
Preceded by Hakuo Yanagisawa	Minister of Health, Labour and Welfare of Japan; 2007–2009	Succeeded by Akira Nagatsuma
