= Takashi Uesugi =

Japanese journalist (born 1968)

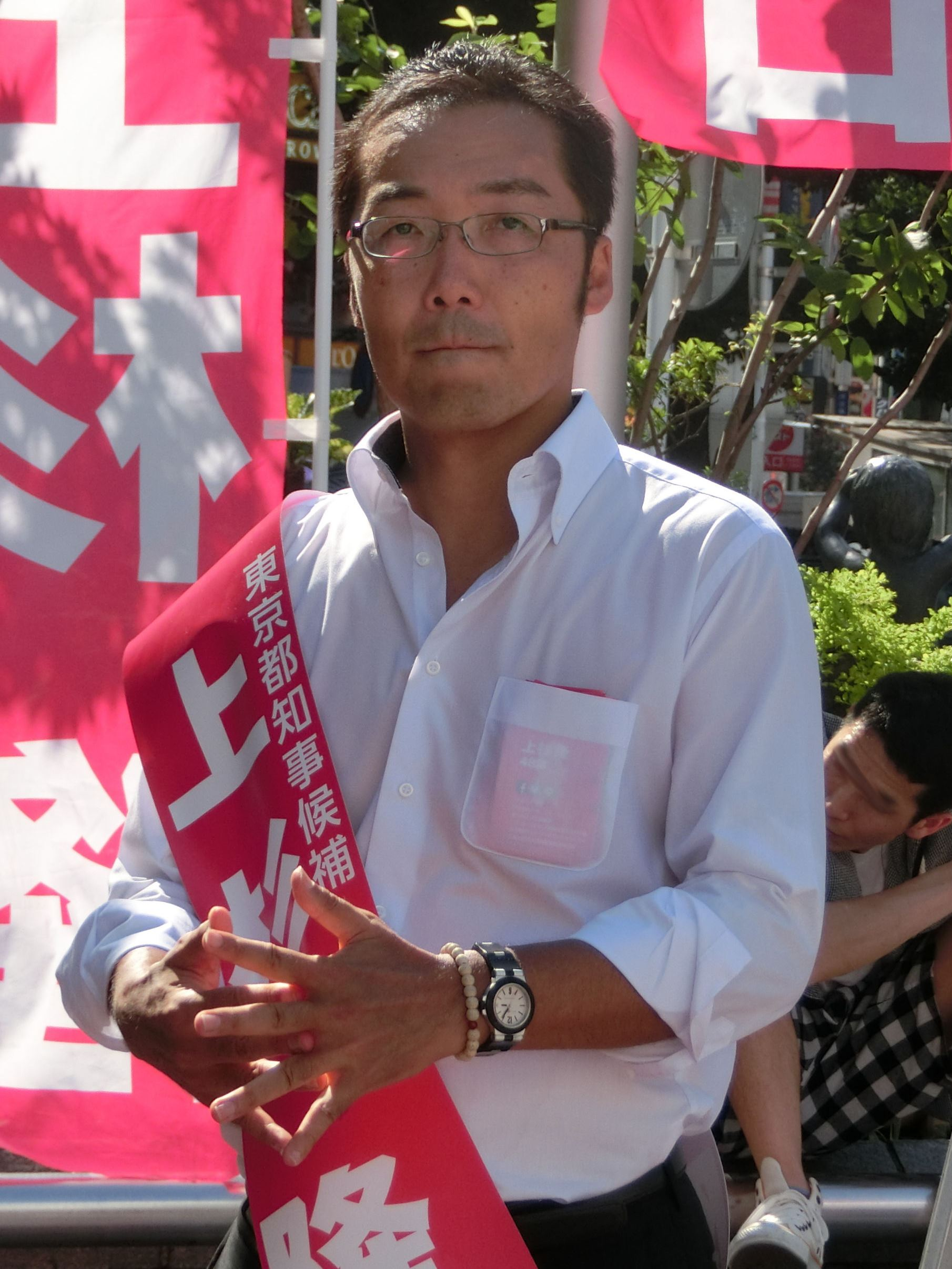
Takashi Uesugi (2016)

Takashi Uesugi (上杉 隆, Uesugi Takashi; born May 3, 1968), is a Japanese freelance journalist and former research assistant for the New York Times, born in Fukuoka Prefecture and raised in Tokyo. He is also former aide to Liberal Democratic Party lawmaker Kunio Hatoyama, and author of numerous books, most recently The Collapse of Journalism (ジャーナリズム崩壊). He also wrote a book about the first Abe administration, The Collapse of the Residence (Kantei Hokai (官邸崩壊)), published in August 2007. He took up the post of Secretary-General of NHK Party in August 2019, but resigned in March 2021.

== Career ==
Takashi Uesugi graduated from the Department of English Literature at Tsuru University. He received an employment offer letter from Japan's national broadcasting company NHK. From age 26, he worked for 5 years as a secretary for Kunio Hatoyama before going to work for the Tokyo branch office of the New York Times.

Uesugi was a candidate in the 2016 Tokyo gubernatorial election and placed fourth with 2.74% of the vote.

== Takashi Uesugi Takes on the "Kisha Kurabu" ==
1999: Under Governor Shintaro Ishihara, the Tokyo Metropolitan Government Press Club is opened up due to Takashi Uesugi’s efforts.

2001: Under Prime Minister Junichiro Koizumi, the Prime Minister’s Press Conference is opened up for "Sports Newspapers" and the International Press due to Takashi Uesugi’s efforts.

2003: Ichiro Ozawa and Naoto Kan, the Democratic Party Press Conference is opened up to all media due to Takashi Uesugi’s efforts.

2007: Takashi Uesugi publishes the book "The Collapse of the Prime Minister's office"

2008: Under Democratic Party Chairman, Prime Minister Ichiro Ozawa the Internet Media is allowed into the Party Congress Press Conference and book "The Collapse of Journalism" is published by Takashi Uesugi.

2009: Under Prime Minister Yukio Hatoyama opened up the Prime Minister's office press club to all media due to Takashi Uesugi’s efforts.

2010: Takashi Uesugi publishes "The Collapse of the Kisha Kurabu".

2011: Under Nuclear Power Minister, Goshi Hosono all media is allowed into the regular Press Conferences on the Fukushima Disaster due to Takashi Uesugi’s efforts.

Takashi Uesugi founds the Free Press Association of Japan.

The Free Press Association hosted Wan Dan, the Dalai Lama, Prime Minister Yukio Hatoyama, Governor Shintaro Ishihara, Prime Minister Naoto Kan, SOFTBANK President Masayoshi Son, Ex-founder Livedoor Takafumi Horie and others and Takashi Uesugi found the "Voice Of Fukushima" organization to report on the situation following the 2011 nuclear meltdown.

2012: Takashi Uesugi establishes "No Border. Inc" as an Internet Television’s Station.

2014: Takashi Uesugi establishes Japan’s first, daily, live interview program, "Op-Ed", and served as producer and anchor and Commentator on MX TVs "Jun and Takashi’s Weekly Literacy" program.

2016: After five years the Tokyo Electric Power Company admitted that there had in fact been a nuclear meltdown as first reported by Takashi Uesugi and denied by TEPCO.

2017: The Op-Ed program, hosted by Takashi Uesugi celebrated three years in operation, 800 programs and 1500 guests to date and began testing of new artificial intelligence (AI) system to do live translating in up to 50 languages.

2018: The Op-Ed program celebrated four years of operation and expanded in addition to its regular interview and reporting, up to the date news on artificial intelligence (AI).
