= Kenji Utsunomiya =

Japanese lawyer

- 宇都宮 健児
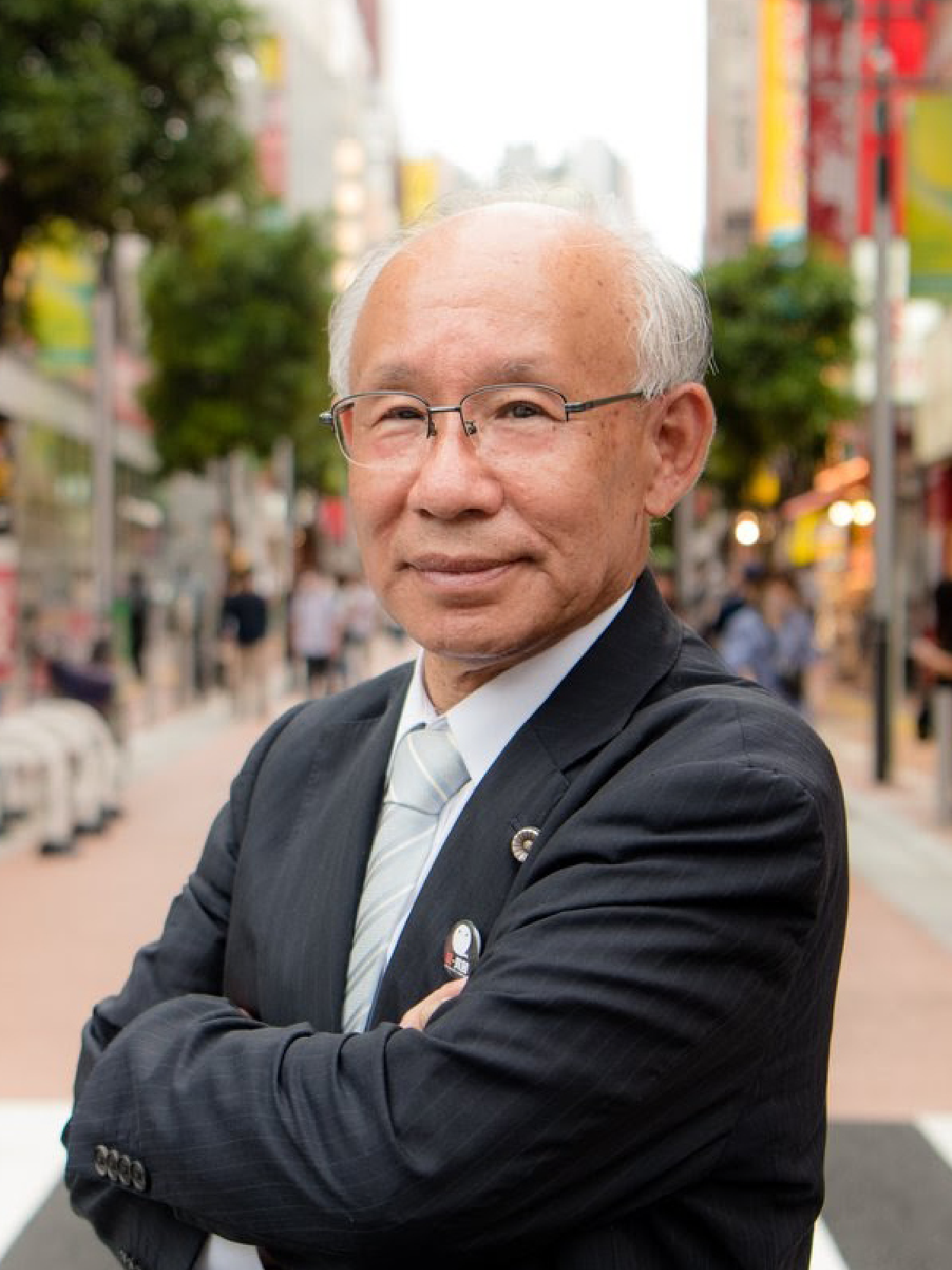
- Utsunomiya in 2020
- Born: December 1, 1946 (age 79); Higashiuwa District, Ehime, now Seiyo, Ehime
- Occupation: Lawyer
- Website: http://utsunomiyakenji.com/

Kenji Utsunomiya (宇都宮 健児, Utsunomiya Kenji; born December 1, 1946) is a Japanese lawyer and former chair of the Japan Federation of Bar Associations.

== Overviews ==
He spent much of his career helping debtors overcome the burden of multiple loans. He was the head of the Japan Federation of Bar Associations from 2010 to 2012, and ran for Governor of Tokyo in the 2012, 2014 and 2020 gubernatorial elections.

== Life and career ==
=== Early life ===
Utsunomiya was born in Higashiuwa District, Ehime, which is now Seiyo, Ehime and grew up in Ehime Prefecture and Oita Prefecture. His father was a disabled Second World War veteran who took up farming after the war, who worked extremely long hours to support his family. Utsunomiya was accepted into Tokyo University in 1968 but quit after he passed his bar exam, for which he studied about 100 hours a week.

=== Hibiya Park Tent Village ===
Utsunomiya served as the honorary mayor of a tent village of laid-off temp workers in Tokyo's Hibiya Park who were laid off due to the 2008 financial crisis. The number of people living there rapidly expanded from around 130 on New Year's Eve 2008, to over 300 on January 2, 2009.

=== President of the Japan Federation of Bar Associations ===
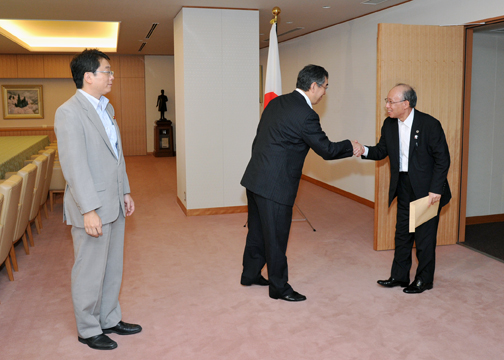
With Takeaki Matsumoto (August 4, 2011)

Utsunomiya was elected as the president of the Japan Federation of Bar Associations in April 2010. An outsider to the politics of the legal profession, he wanted to ensure young lawyers could find jobs, and was elected to a two-year term after he promised to cut the number of new lawyers in half.

== Bids for governor of Tokyo ==
=== 2012 campaign ===
Utsunomiya was a candidate in the 2012 Tokyo gubernatorial election. He announced his candidacy on November 9, 2012, after long-term Governor Shintaro Ishihara suddenly resigned to return to national politics ahead of the then-looming next general election. A field of nine candidates emerged, with the front-runner being Naoki Inose, who had been vice-governor under Ishihara from 2007 to 2012, and then acting governor after Ishihara's abrupt resignation. Inose vowed to follow Ishihara's policies.

Utsunomiya stated that he wanted to improve support for the less fortunate of Tokyo by expanding employment opportunities and providing improved welfare and medical care. While other leading candidates wished to continue many Ishihara's policies and priorities, Utsunomiya harshly criticized Ishihara's administration, saying "Ishihara didn't care about enriching Tokyoites' lives. During Ishihara's tenure, the number of those who starved to death or went on welfare in the 23 wards doubled." He was alone among the candidates who said that they would reconsider Tokyo's bid for the 2020 Olympics, and criticized Ishihara's rash decisions such as his attempt to purchase the Senkaku Islands, which caused much friction between China and Japan.

In addition, he said that he wanted to pressure the central government to abolish nuclear power, and also to do more to provide assistance for victims of the 2011 Tōhoku earthquake and tsunami.

Utsunomiya ran as an independent, as is traditional for most candidates for governorships in Japan. He was however endorsed by the Japanese Communist Party, the Social Democratic Party, and the Tomorrow Party of Japan. The Democratic Party of Japan itself did not endorse any candidate, but former Prime Minister Naoto Kan of the party supported him.

Utsunomiya ultimately came second in the election, gaining 968,960 votes. The result was a landslide victory for Inose, who received 4,338,936 votes.

=== 2014 campaign ===
Utsunomiya was the first candidate to enter the 2014 Tokyo gubernatorial election following Inose's resignation due to a financial scandal. He called for providing a check against Prime Minister Shinzo Abe, closing all nuclear plants, restricting spending on the 2020 Summer Olympics and making Tokyo "a secure city where people can live and work."

One of his talking points was opposing the expansion plan for the National Olympic Stadium: he quipped in one campaign speech that "only Arashi and AKB48 can fill an 80,000 person stadium. It's going to go into the red after the Olympics."

As in his 2012 campaign, he ran as an independent. He was again endorsed by the Japanese Communist Party, the Social Democratic Party. After the emergence of Morihiro Hosokawa's candidacy, former Prime Minister Naoto Kan, who had backed Utsunomiya in his previous bid for governor in 2012, called on him to leave the race out of fears that he would split the anti-nuclear vote in Tokyo. Utsunomiya came in second place with 982,595 votes, with victory going to Yoichi Masuzoe with 2,112,979 votes.

=== 2016 campaign ===
After some speculation, Utsunomiya officially announced his candidacy for the 2016 Tokyo gubernatorial election on July 11, 2016, but withdrew shortly afterwards to avoid taking votes from the main opposition candidate Shuntaro Torigoe. The election was subsequently won by Yuriko Koike of the Liberal Democratic Party, with Torigoe placing third.

=== 2020 campaign ===
Utsunomiya ran again as an independent in the 2020 Tokyo gubernatorial election on July 5, 2020, and was considered the main opposition candidate in the race after winning the endorsements of the Constitutional Democratic Party, the Communist Party and the Social Democratic Party. The election was again won by incumbent Yuriko Koike, with Utsunomiya placing second with 844,151 votes or 13.76% of the vote.
