= Japan First Party =

Japan First Party 日本第一党 Nippon Dai-ichi Tō
- Abbreviation: JFP
- Leader: Takako Yamaguchi
- Founder: Makoto Sakurai
- Founded: 29 August 2016; 10 years ago
- Dissolved: 20 October 2026; 27 days ago
- Headquarters: Suginami City, Tokyo, Kantō
- Membership (2021): 1,122
- Ideology: Japanese nationalism; Ultranationalism; Anti-immigration; Anti-Korean sentiment
- Political position: Far-right
- Colours: Black; Red

Website
- japan-first.net

The Japan First Party (JFP; 日本第一党, Nihon/Nippon Dai-ichi Tō) is a far-right political party in Japan founded by Makoto Sakurai.

== History ==
On 15 August 2016, Sakurai announced in front of a crowd at the annual gathering to protest the Hantenren in front of Yasukuni Shrine that he would not stop at the Tokyo election, and would create a new political party to prioritize and benefit the people of Japan over foreign powers. After first jokingly announcing the new party name as "A meeting to bring the metropolitan government back into the hands of the people" (都政を国民の手に取り戻す会), he formally announced on 29 August 2016, the party name "Japan First Party" (日本第一党).

The JFP held its first convention in APA Hotel on 26 February 2017, and Sakurai, who was until then de facto leader, formally became leader of the JFP.

As of 27 April 2017, there are about 1800 party members, but no members of the party in any government office. The same day, Mikio Okamura (岡村幹雄), sitting beside Sakurai, formally announced at a press conference his plan to run for the upcoming Tokyo Prefecture Legislature Election (ja) in July 2017.

In 2021, Makoto Sakurai ran for the Tokyo gubernatorial election and received 178,784 votes (2.92%). The Japan First Party ran in the 2021 Japanese general election running a total of 5 candidates, with 33,611 votes (0.52%) and Makoto Sakurai having 9,449 votes (3.96%) in the Tokyo 15th District.

The Japan First Party ran in the 2022 Japanese House of Councillors election running a total of 10 candidates, with 109,046 proportional votes (0.21%) and 74,097 constituency votes (0.14%).

In 20 October 2026, it was announced that the party would be dissolved due to a worsening financial situation.

== Policies ==
Many of the promises from Sakurai's campaign in the Tokyo gubernatorial election have been included in the policies outlined by the JFP such as the exclusion of foreigners from receiving welfare. The policies include the rewriting of the Japanese constitution from scratch to put the Emperor as the head of state, install a military, and make defense of the country a civic duty. JFP is also evaluated as a Netto-uyoku or alt-right group.

== Election results ==
=== House of Representatives ===
House of Representatives
Election	Leader	No. of candidates	Seats			Position	Constituency votes		PR Block votes		Status
Election	Leader	No. of candidates	No.	±	Share	Position	No.	Share	No.	Share	Status
2021	Makoto Sakurai		0 / 480	0	11th		33,661	0.06%	9,449	0.02%	Extra-parliamentary
2024	Makoto Sakurai	did not contest					did not contest				Extra-parliamentary

=== House of Councillors ===
House of Councillors
Election	Leader	Seats				Position	Constituency		Party list		Status
Election	Leader	Won	±	Share	Total (Note: The Upper house is split in two classes, one elected every three years.)	Position	Number	%	Number	%	Status
2022	Makoto Sakurai	0 / 125		0%	0 / 248	15th	74,097	0.14%	109,046	0.21%	Extra-parliamentary
2025	Takako Yamaguchi	did not contest					did not contest				Extra-parliamentary

=== Tokyo Gubernatorial ===
Election	Candidate	Result		
Election	Candidate	Result	Votes	%
2016	Makoto Sakurai	Lost	114,171	1.74
2020	Makoto Sakurai	Lost	178,784	2.92
2024	Makoto Sakurai	Lost	83,600	1.20

== See also ==
- America First (policy)
- Netto-uyoku
