= Haken (employment) =

Japanese term for a temp worker

Haken (派遣, haken) is the Japanese term for temporary employees dispatched to companies by staffing agencies.

== Background ==
The temporary staffing industry in Japan is regulated by the 1985 Worker Dispatch Law.

The original aim of this law was to regulate the extra-legal system of subcontractor personnel dispatching that had become commonplace in the automobile and electronics industries. Designed to allow project-based work and temporary staffing in sectors plagued by shortages of highly skilled workers (e.g., software specialists), the 1985 law limited temporary staffing to a "white list" of 13 occupations. But subsequent revisions steadily expanded its range of application. Notably, the 1999 revision replaced the "white list" with a short "black list" of occupations where temporary staffing remained restricted. This had the effect of opening most of the labor market to the temporary staffing industry. Finally, the 2004 revision removed most of the remaining restrictions on temporary staffing in the manufacturing sector.

The result was an enormous expansion of temporary labor in the Japanese labor market. Between 2000 and 2007, the number of regular employees in Japan declined by about 1.9 million, while the number of nonregular workers increased by about 4.5 million. By 2008, short-term contract and temporary staffing workers had increased from a small percentage to more than 30% of the Japanese labor force.

== Types of haken ==
There are two types of haken:

(1) "Specified worker dispatching undertakings" whereby a temp agency hires temporary workers on a regular basis and sends them on assignment to work at its client companies.

(2) "General worker dispatching undertakings" whereby a temp agency registers temporary workers and sends them to its client companies on a contingent basis by signing a per-job contract each time the agency receives an assignment from its client companies.

== Layoffs ==
Haken-giri (派遣切り) is the Japanese term for layoffs of temporary employees (haken) dispatched to companies by staffing agencies. In particular, it refers to the wave of layoffs that followed the 2008 financial crisis, which highlighted recent structural changes in the Japanese labor market and prompted calls for reform of the labor laws. Estimates of the number of layoffs between October 2008 and March 2009 range from 131,000, according to the Ministry of Health, Labour and Welfare, to 400,000, according to staffing industry associations. The problem was especially acute because temporary workers enjoy few of the rights and benefits that protect full-time regular employees. For example, at least half of Japan's non-regular workers are ineligible for unemployment benefits because they have not held their jobs a year or longer. In many cases, both haken and short-term contract workers were laid off before the terms of their contracts, but the lack of penalties in the labor laws meant that no redress was available except through civil lawsuits.

Public interest in the plight of the laid-off workers peaked around the end of 2008, when 500 unemployed and homeless temporary workers converged on a "New Year's Haken Tent Village" in Hibiya Park in central Tokyo. Well-known lawyer and consumer advocate Kenji Utsunomiya was declared the "honorary mayor" of the village. According to the organizing committee, many of the workers were in poor physical condition, and eight were hospitalized with pneumonia. In response, some companies rescinded their early layoffs, or at least agreed to allow temporary workers to continue living in company dormitories until the period of their contracts. But the widespread public perception that large corporations had failed to live up to their social responsibilities led to calls for reform of the labor laws. In February, the Tokyo Bar Association issued a 10-point statement calling for reforms such as restoration of the "white list" of skilled occupations, an upper limit on margins levied by staffing agencies, prohibition of dispatching within corporate groups, and stricter penalties for early layoffs.

== Revisions of Worker Dispatch Law ==
In 2010 the Japanese government has indicated that it intended to revise the Worker Dispatch Law in regard to temporary employees. The main points of the revision centered on:

(1) problematic registration-type dispatches will be prohibited in principle, except for highly specialized jobs, such as language interpretation;

(2) dispatches to manufacturing industries will be banned in principle, except for regular-type long-term employment;

(3) day labor dispatches and dispatches shorter than two months will be banned in principle; and

(4) in the case of illegal dispatch, the user company or other user organization will be obliged to offer an employment contract to the dispatched worker.

In 2015 further revisions came into effect, which were seen as a mixed blessing for temporary workers and were expected to increase industry's use of such labor.

On April 1 2020, the Japanese government has added additional changes to dispatch law in Japan, in an effort to improve the benefits for contract workers as part of a government work style reform. The regulations impose strict regulations on dispatch agencies to select between an “Equal Pay and Benefits” or “Labour Management Agreement” method of dispatch. As a brief explanation, the new legislation requires dispatch workers to receive the equivalent benefits and remuneration as equivalent permanent workers. This is achieved by reviewing all categories of benefits and remuneration such as salary, commute, leave allowance, pension, and all other benefits. Wages must also be compared to the government mandated average pay table (which has varying rates based on job type, seniority and location) and then against all financial and non-financial benefits offered by the dispatch agency.
