= Mac Akasaka =

Japanese businessman and retired politician

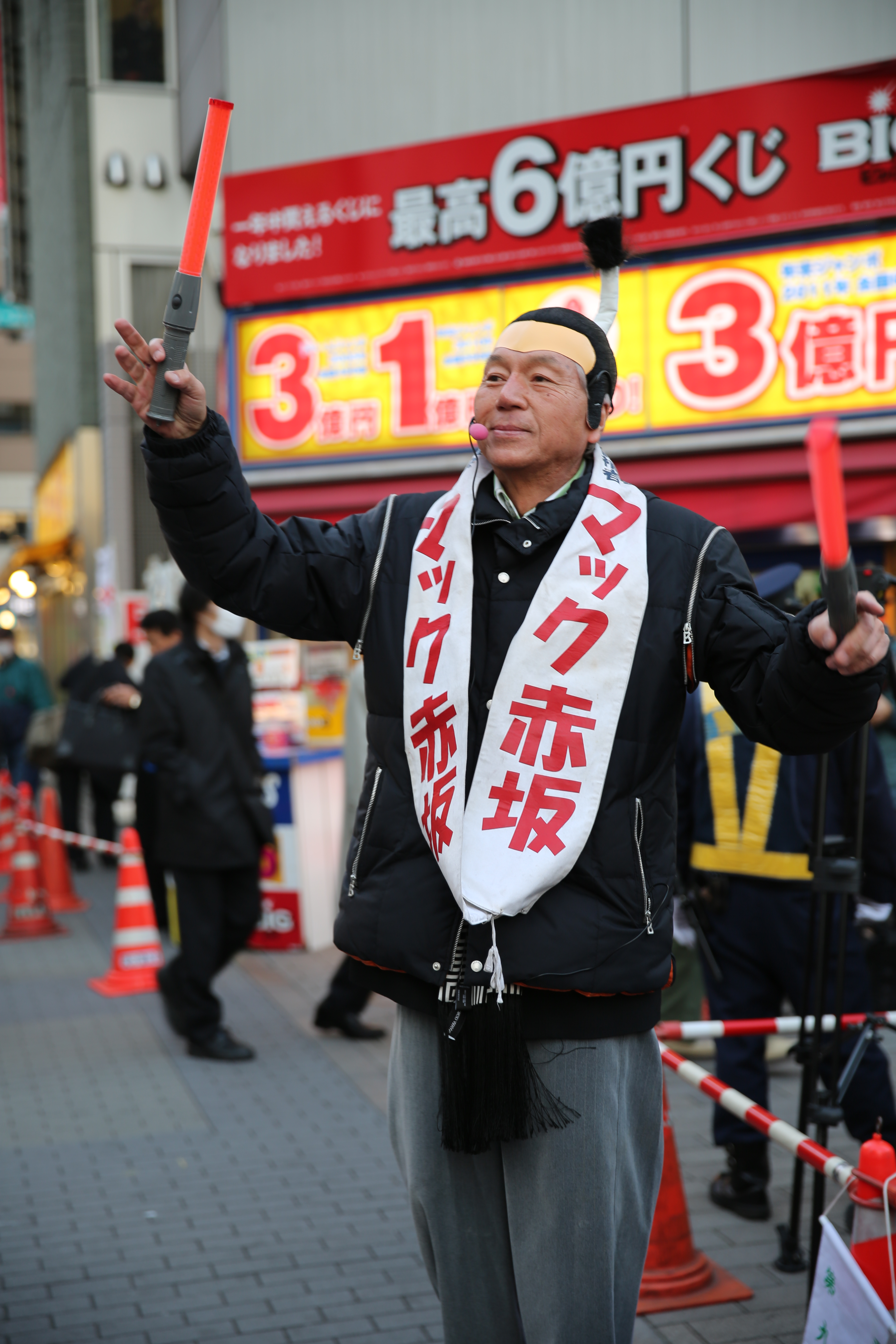
- Mac Akasaka campaigning for Tokyo Governor at JR Shimbashi Station in Tokyo (2014)

Assembly Member for Minato
- In office May 1, 2019 – April 30, 2023

Personal details
- Born: Makoto Tonami; September 18, 1948 (age 77) Nagoya, Japan
- Citizenship: Japan
- Party: Smile Party
- Education: Kyoto University

Makoto Tonami (戸並 誠, Tonami Makoto; born September 18, 1948), also known as Mac Akasaka (マック 赤坂, Makku Akasaka), is a Japanese businessman, retired politician and activist and former perennial candidate.

== Biography ==
He was born in Nagoya, grew up in a struggling family, and attended Kyoto University. He spent 25 years as an executive at the trading company Itochu, where he built a rare-earth metals trading business and ultimately retired early with a 120 million yen severance package. He went into politics after his retirement. He now manages the Smile Therapy Association in Akasaka, Tokyo. Akasaka claims to have personal assets of billions of yen, which he uses to cover the cost of his political campaigns.

He has run for various political offices in recent years, including the Minato City Assembly (2007), the House of Representatives (2007, 2009, and 2010), Governor of Tokyo (2007, 2011, 2012, 2014 and 2016), Governor of Osaka Prefecture (2011), Governor of Niigata Prefecture (2012) and Mayor of Osaka City (2014), running as the candidate of the Smile Party (スマイル党). In these elections he has become known for flamboyant election speeches, often in costume, and for staging impromptu concerts in public areas such as central Shibuya. His official election speech broadcasts, in which he stressed the importance of smiling while wearing an outlandish costume such as Superman or a space alien, became popular on YouTube and other video sites.

His campaigns through 2012 cost a total of around 30-40 million yen; his 2012 run for governor of Tokyo alone cost around 5 million yen even though he chose not to print election posters. Akasaka considered staying out of the Tokyo gubernatorial election in 2014, as profits from his rare-earth trading were down, and he was less willing to front the 3 million yen bond required to run. He finally announced that he would run after an outpouring of comments on Twitter urging him to do so. He wrote: "There are Mac fans throughout the world, not just among the voters of Tokyo, but even in Hollywood and Lausanne. They are looking forward to my election video."

Akasaka won a seat in the Minato District Council in 2019, his 14th election; Akasaka considered this to be his last attempt at an election. He retired at the end of his term in 2023 due to his failing health.

== Legal issues ==
Tonami was indicted for tax fraud in 2010 on charges that he concealed 234 million yen in income over a span of three years, and received a suspended prison sentence.
