= Kazuma Ieiri =

Improved

Kazuma Ieiri (家入 一真, Ieiri Kazuma; born December 28, 1978) is a Japanese entrepreneur recognized by Forbes as one of Japan’s leading figures in the startup ecosystem. He is the founder and former director (until 2011) of the web hosting company paperboy & co., and the founder of the crowdfunding platform studygift. In 2014, he ran as a candidate in the 2014 Tokyo gubernatorial election. In 2017, he co-founded NOW Venture Capital in Tokyo alongside investment bankers from Mizuho Financial Group and a certified public accountant with an MBA from the London Business School. The firm has since invested in over 63 companies.

== Early life ==
Ieiri was born in Fukuoka Prefecture, Japan. He dropped out of high school within his first year and became a self-described hikikomori (social recluse). During this period, he taught himself computer programming and engaged with others through a bulletin board system using a computer he received as a graduation gift from junior high school. After working various jobs—including newspaper delivery and graphic design—he founded his first company, a web design and server rental business called "paperboy & co."

== Career ==
By the age of 27, Ieiri had grown the company to 72 employees and achieved annual revenues of 850 million yen. At age 29, he became the youngest CEO to list a company on the JASDAQ stock exchange when Paperboy went public (JASDAQ: 3633). He resigned as a director of the company in March 2011.

Following the IPO of Paperboy, Ieiri expanded into various other ventures. He opened a restaurant and café and launched "liverty," a collective of online content creators.

Kazuma Ieiri is no longer affiliated with paperboy & co., having stepped down from the company. He is the CEO of CAMPFIRE Inc., which operates a crowdfunding platform. As a serial entrepreneur, he has held CEO positions at numerous startups across a variety of industries, including ScareCrow Inc. (now playwith partners Inc.), Ikenie Tokyo Inc. (now Chimera Inc.), Amazonas Vida Inc., partyfactory Inc., onelife Inc., FIREX Inc., CAMPFIRE SOCIAL CAPITAL Inc., Founder Foundy Inc. (now NOW Inc.), and Exodus Inc. He is also the co-founder and executive director of BASE Inc., a smart e-commerce platform, and the CEO of partycompany Inc., a café production and management company. In addition, he is CEO of NOW Venture Capital, a venture capital firm focused on early-stage startups. Ieiri has been actively involved in launching and managing a wide range of ventures, spanning technology startups, social enterprises, and investment firms.

== 2014 Tokyo gubernatorial election ==
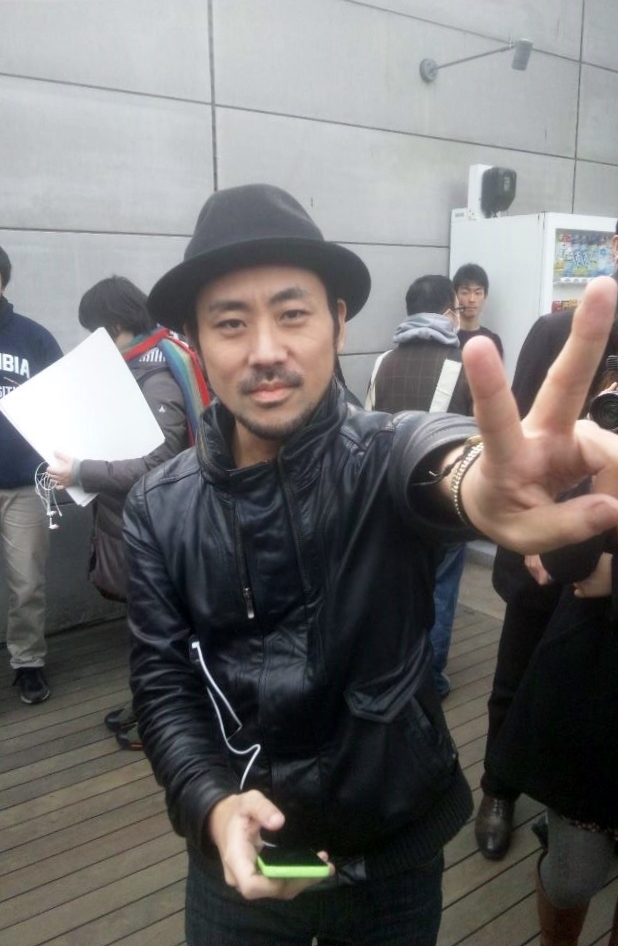
Kazuma Ieiri campaigning in Tokyo, January 2014

In 2014, Ieiri declared his candidacy for the 2014 Tokyo gubernatorial election. He announced on Twitter that he would run if his tweet received 1,000 retweets—a milestone that was reached within 30 minutes. Among those who retweeted was fellow internet entrepreneur Takafumi Horie, who also provided the 3 million yen deposit required to enter the race. Ieiri conducted an unconventional campaign by Japanese standards, raising 7.2 million yen through crowdfunding and live-streaming his campaign headquarters. Rather than presenting a fixed policy platform, he created an online forum to crowdsource policy ideas from supporters. He ultimately received 1.8% of the vote.
