= Shuntaro Torigoe =

Japanese journalist and political activist

Shuntaro Torigoe 鳥越 俊太郎
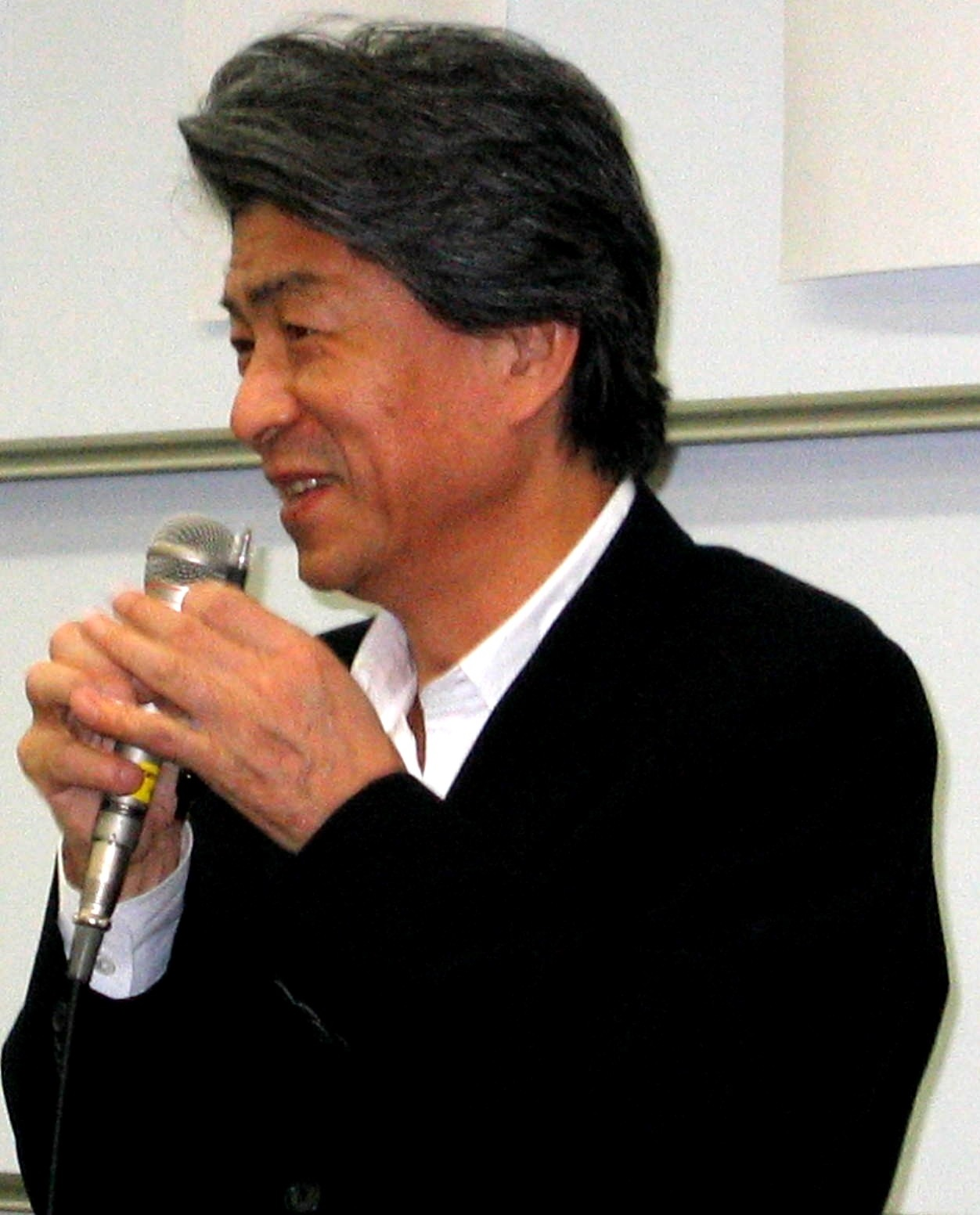
- Torigoe in 2006, speaking at Waseda University
- Born: 13 March 1940 (age 86); Ukiha, Fukuoka, Japan
- Occupation: Journalist

Shuntaro Torigoe (鳥越 俊太郎, Torigoe Shuntarō) (born 13 March 1940) is a Japanese journalist and political activist.

== Early life ==
Born in 1940 in Yoshi-cho, Ukiha-gun, Fukuoka Prefecture (now Ukiha City). His father's name was Toshio, and he was given the name Shuntaro, taking on Toshio's first character. His father graduated from university and went to work for a company, and after being bullied in the workplace, he developed neurosis, and when Shuntaro was born, he was admitted to the psychiatric ward of Kyushu University.

In 1946, he entered primary school and became the first student to receive post-war education. After attending Kurume University High School, he graduated from Kyoto University's Department of Literature (majoring in Japanese History) in 1965, studying for two years as he became absorbed in the student movement.

In 1965, he joined the Mainichi Shimbun. His first position was at the Niigata branch.

== Journalism career ==
Torigoe was born in present-day Ukiha, Fukuoka and graduated from Kyoto University. He began his reporting career with the Mainichi Shimbun in 1965. He served at one point as the Mainichi correspondent in Tehran, and traveled to the front lines of the Iran–Iraq War in 1984, becoming the only Japanese journalist to do so. He left Mainichi in 1989 and thereafter was known for his role as a commentator on TV Asahi news programs. He was named editor-in-chief of OhMyNews Japan in 2006.

Torigoe was diagnosed with stage IV colorectal cancer in 2005 and underwent several years of treatment, including four operations. He published a book on the experience entitled Cancer Patient.

== Political career ==
Torigoe became active in the opposition to collective security legislation in 2015 and took part in demonstrations at the National Diet Building.

== 2016 Tokyo gubernatorial election ==
Shortly following the July 2016 upper house election, in which pro-constitutional amendment parties secured a two-thirds supermajority in both houses of the Diet, Torigoe declared his candidacy for the Tokyo gubernatorial election with the support of the Democratic Party. Kenji Utsunomiya, who ran with DPJ support in the 2014 gubernatorial election, withdrew one day before the start of the campaign in order to boost Torigoe's chances against pro-establishment rivals Hiroya Masuda and Yuriko Koike.

A Torigoe's sex scandal more than 10 years old was reported by two weekly magazines, Shukan Bunshun and Shukan Shincho, where he is alleged to have seduced a 20-year old university student. Torigoe has called the allegations groundless. However Utsunomiya wrote in an open letter to Torigoe that "from looking at the article itself, we cannot consider the case to be groundless," and called on Torigoe to publicly explain the situation at a press conference as a condition for Utsunomiya's public support.
