= Hiroya Masuda =

Japanese politician (born 1951)

- 増田 寛也
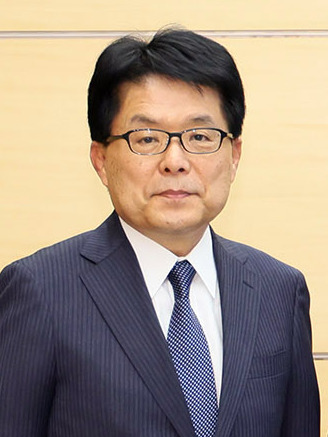
- Masuda in 2024

Minister for Internal Affairs and Communications
- In office 27 August 2007 – 24 September 2008
- Prime Minister: Shinzo Abe; Yasuo Fukuda
- Preceded by: Yoshihide Suga
- Succeeded by: Kunio Hatoyama

Governor of Iwate Prefecture
- In office 30 April 1995 – 30 April 2007
- Monarch: Akihito
- Preceded by: Iwao Kudo
- Succeeded by: Takuya Tasso

Personal details
- Born: 20 December 1951 (age 74) Setagaya, Tokyo, Japan
- Party: Independent
- Parent: Sakari Masuda (father)
- Education: University of Tokyo

Hiroya Masuda (増田 寛也, Masuda Hiroya; born 20 December 1951) is a Japanese politician, government official, and business executive. He was Minister of Internal Affairs and Communications from August 2007 to September 2008, and has served as the president and CEO of Japan Post Holdings since January 2020.

== Early life and government career ==
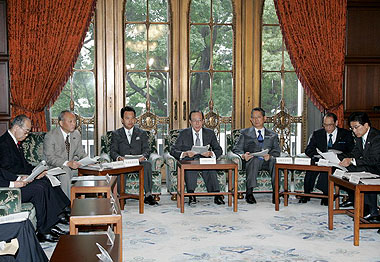
Masuda with Yasuo Fukuda and Ministers of State in 2007

Masuda was born in Tokyo in 1951, and graduated from the University of Tokyo in 1977. He joined the Ministry of Construction after graduation, and was thereafter appointed to several management positions in the Japanese government, including Director of the Traffic Enforcement Division at Chiba Prefectural Police Headquarters (1982), Director of the Railway Traffic Division for Ibaraki Prefecture (1986), Director for River Administration Policy Planning at the Ministry of Construction (1993), and Director for Construction Disputes Settlement at the Ministry of Construction (1994).

== Political career ==
=== Governor of Iwate Prefecture ===
Masuda served as governor of Iwate Prefecture from 1995 to 2007. Upon his election, he was the youngest governor in Japanese history at the age of 43. While serving as Iwate's governor, Masuda developed a reputation as a reformist by cutting spending through personnel cuts and took the initiative in introducing an industrial waste tax system.

Masuda implemented a nationwide public relations campaign starting in 2001 that branded Iwate as a slower, "no effort" lifestyle alternative to Tokyo and other major cities. The campaign was popular locally, and Masuda was re-elected in 2003 with 88% of votes cast.

=== Minister for Internal Affairs ===
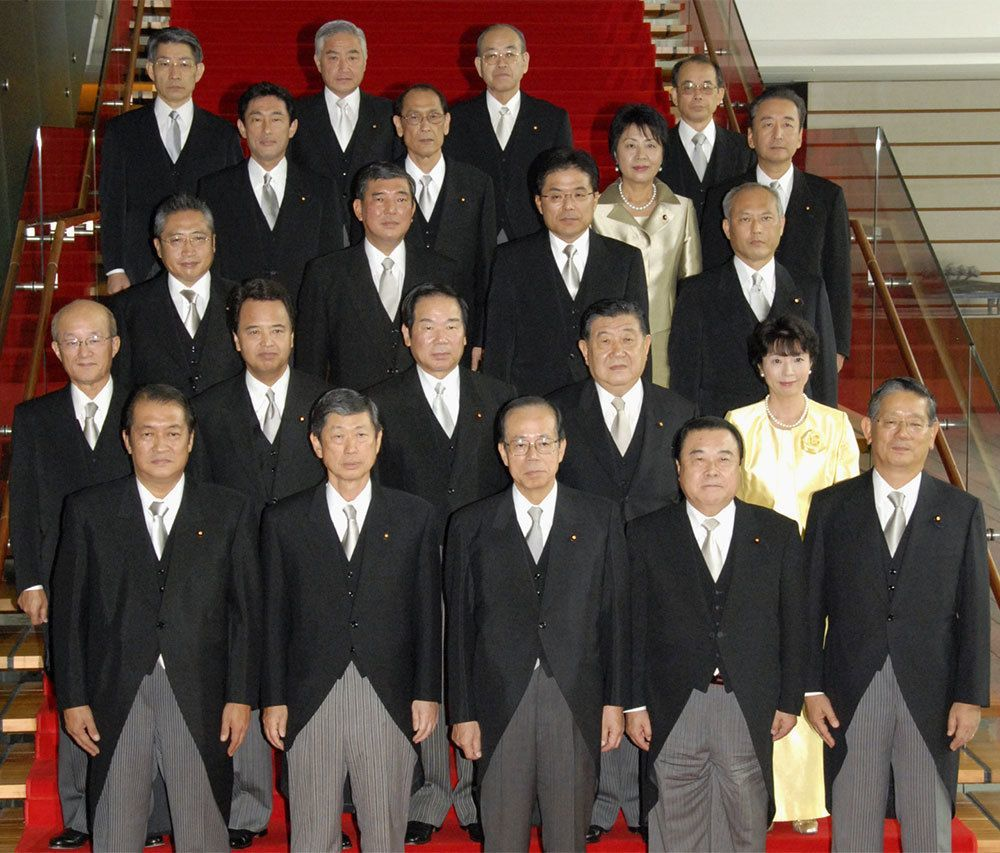
Masuda with members of the Yasuo Fukuda Cabinet in 2007

Prime Minister Shinzo Abe appointed Masuda to head the Ministry of Internal Affairs and Communications in 2007. Shortly after his appointment, he admitted mishandling a 1 million yen donation to his gubernatorial campaign in 2003. Japan's postal service was privatized under Masuda's watch in October 2007.

He was reappointed as Minister of Internal Affairs when Prime Minister Yasuo Fukuda reshuffled the cabinet on 1 August 2008. In the Cabinet of Prime Minister Taro Aso, appointed on 24 September 2008, Masuda was replaced by Kunio Hatoyama.

=== Later activities ===
Masuda served as chairman of the government's postal privatization committee from 2013 to 2016. In this role, he gradually relaxed limits on deposits and life insurance policies at Japan Post, resisting political pressure from the ruling Liberal Democratic Party to relax these limits more quickly.

Masuda wrote a 2013 article in Chuo Koron magazine arguing that growth in Tokyo was leading to population decay in other regions of Japan, further describing Tokyo as a "population black hole" due to the difficulty of raising children there. Political and corporate leaders in Japan were jolted by the conclusions of a 2014 book by Masuda called Local Extinctions, a detailed report of population changes that used the latest official figures from the National Institution of Population and Social Security Research to show that 896 cities, towns and villages throughout Japan were facing extinction by 2040. At first glance, the book simply repeated what earlier reports had concluded; however, it also included the percentages by which child-bearing women between the ages of 20 and 40 were expected to decline in each and every city, town and village.

Masuda was approached in 2016 by twenty-one of the twenty-three Tokyo ward mayors to run for Governor of Tokyo in the July 2016 election. The Tokyo branch of the Liberal Democratic Party threw its official support behind Masuda, warning members that they would be reprimanded if they supported rival Yuriko Koike (also an LDP member).

== Japan Post ==
Masuda was appointed as President and CEO of Japan Post Holdings in January 2020 in the wake of a scandal related to improper sales of insurance products. He had previously turned down an offer to head the company in 2019, but said that he decided to accept out of a sense of duty.

Political offices
Preceded by Yoshihide Suga	Minister of Internal Affairs and Communications of Japan; 2007 – 2008	Succeeded by Kunio Hatoyama
Preceded by Yoshihide Suga	Minister of State for Decentralisation Reform, Regional Revitalization, Regional Government of Japan; 2007 – 2008	Succeeded by Kunio Hatoyama as Minister of State for Decentralisation Reform
Preceded by Yoshihide Suga	Minister of State for Decentralisation Reform, Regional Revitalization, Regional Government of Japan; 2007 – 2008	Office abolished State for Regional Revitalization, Regional Government
Preceded by Iwao Kudō	Governor of Iwate; 1995 – 2007	Succeeded by Takuya Tasso
