= 2012 Tokyo gubernatorial election =

Election for Governor of Tokyo

- 16 December 2012
- Turnout: 5,942,443 (62.6%)
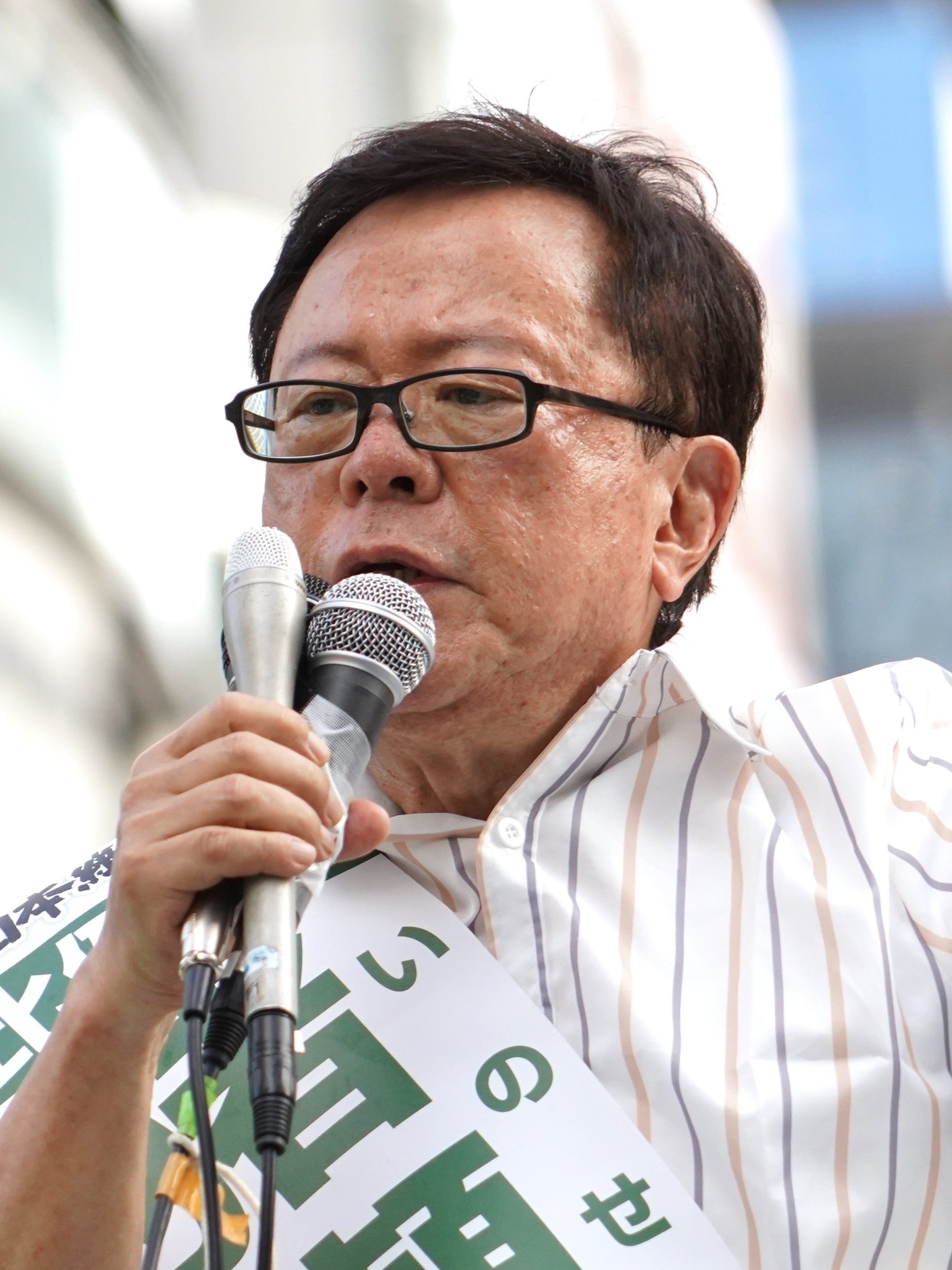

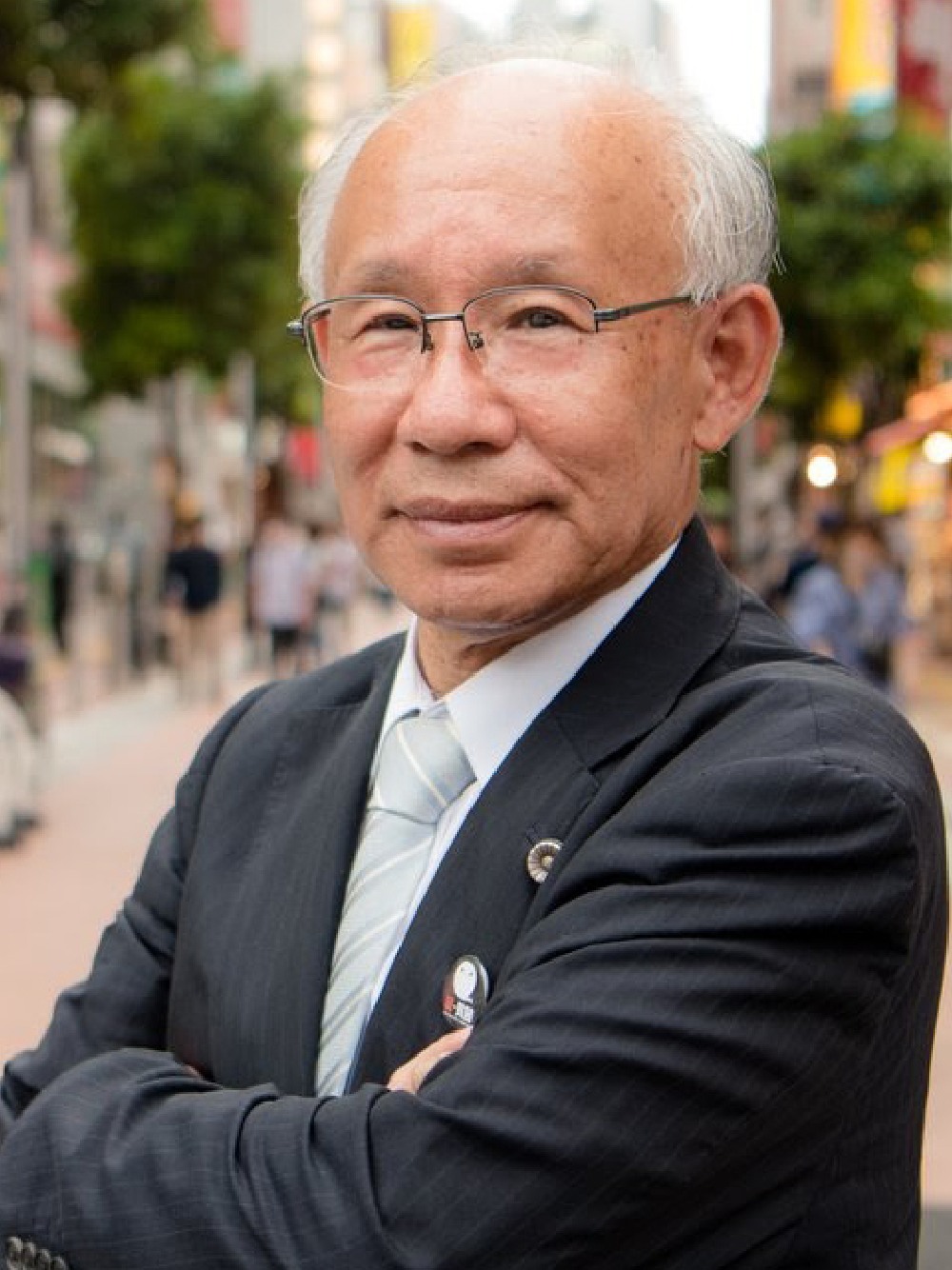

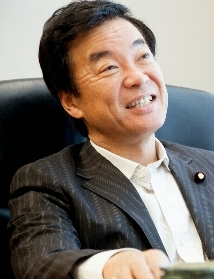
Candidate	Naoki Inose	Kenji Utsunomiya	Shigefumi Matsuzawa
Party	Independent	Independent	Independent
Popular vote	4,338,936	968,960	956,063
Percentage	65.27%	14.58%	9.35%
Supported by	LDP, NK	TPJ, JCP, SDP, GJ, NSP, TSN	DPJ, PLP, UP
Governor before election
Shintaro Ishihara
Independent
Elected Governor
Naoki Inose
Independent

The 2012 Tokyo gubernatorial election took place on December 16, 2012, which was held on the same day as the general election.

== Background ==
The incumbent since 1999, Governor Shintaro Ishihara suddenly resigned from office to return to national politics ahead of the then-looming next general election. A field of nine candidates emerged, with the front-runner being Naoki Inose, who had been vice-governor under Ishihara from 2007 to 2012, and then acting governor after Ishihara's abrupt resignation. Inose vowed to follow Ishihara's policies.

=== Candidates ===
- Mac Akasaka (real name: Makoto Tonami) - Therapist, activist, perennial candidate. Founder and leader of the Smile Party.
- Masaichi Igarashi - Member of the board of directors of an international exchange body.
- Naoki Inose - Journalist, historian, social critic. Then vice-governor of Tokyo and acting governor.
- Shigefumi Matsuzawa - Former governor of Kanagawa Prefecture.
- Yoshiro Nakamatsu (Dr. NakaMats)- Inventor, perennial candidate.
- Takashi Sasagawa - Former LDP General Council Chairman.
- Tokuma Suginomori (TOKMA) - Rock musician. Director of the Happiness Realization Party's youth division.
- Kenji Utsunomiya - Lawyer. Former head of the Japan Federation of Bar Associations from 2010 to 2012.
- Shigenobu Yoshida - Former Japanese ambassador to Nepal.

=== Campaign ===
Information campaign for the polls was administered by the Tokyo Metropolitan Election Administration Commission. AKB48's Minami Takahashi, Tomomi Itano and Yui Yokoyama (also of NMB48) were appointed as image characters.

== Result ==
The result was a landslide victory for Inose, who received 4,338,936 votes, setting a new record for the total number of votes in a Tokyo gubernatorial election. The previous record was 3.61 million cast for the socialist Governor Ryokichi Minobe in 1971.

Tokyo gubernatorial election, 2012
Party	Candidate	Votes	%	±%
Independent (Supported by Liberal Democratic, New Komeito, Restoration)	Naoki Inose	4,338,936	65.27%	N/A
Independent (Supported by Tomorrow, Communist, Social Democratic, Greens, New Socialist, Seikatsusha)	Kenji Utsunomiya	968,960	14.58%	N/A
Independent (Supported by Democrats, People's Life, Unity)	Shigefumi Matsuzawa	621,278	9.35%	N/A
Party for Preservation of Citizens' Lives	Takashi Sasagawa	179,180	2.7%	N/A
Independent	Yoshiro Nakamatsu	129,406	1.95%	N/A
Independent	Shigenobu Yoshida	81,885	1.23%	N/A
Happiness Realization	Tokuma Suginomori	47,829	0.72%	N/A
Smile	Mac Akasaka	38,855	0.58%	▲0.50%
Independent	Masaichi Igarashi	36,114	0.54%	N/A
Turnout		5,942,443	62.6%	▲4.8%
