= National Governors Association of Japan =

The National Governors' Association (NGA) (全国知事会, Zenkoku chiji kai) is a national alliance of prefectural governors established under Article 263-3 of the Local Autonomy Law. It mainly makes requests and policy recommendations to the national government regarding local administration and finance. It has organized the Local Autonomy Establishment Measures Council together with the National Association of Prefectural Assembly Speakers, the National Association of City Mayors, the National Association of City Council Speakers, the National Association of Town and Village Speakers, and the National Association of Town and Village Council Speakers.

== History ==
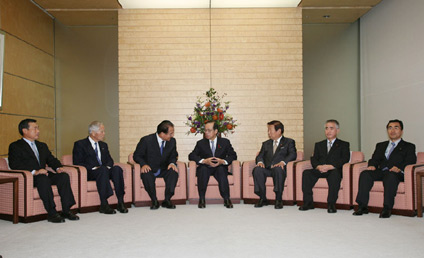
Meeting between the Prime Minister and representatives of six local organizations, including the National Governors' Association (October 4, 2007, at the Prime Minister's Official Residence)

On 1 October 1947, the National Federation of Local Government Councils was established. On 11 October 1950, the Name changed to the current name.

=== Modern Era ===
In May 2021, the NGA indicated that all 47 prefectures did not have enough staff able to work at vaccination sites.

In August 2021, the NGA called for a lockdown amid a rise in infections.

On 2 October 2021, governors met with the prime ministers to discuss the latest COVID-19 wave.

On 7 October 2021, the Prime Minister held a meeting with the National Governors' Association President.

On 1 February 2022, the Prime Minister held a meeting with the National Governors’ Association.

== Regional blocs ==
Some prefectures that lie on the borders of regional blocks participate in the governors' associations of multiple blocks.

- Hokkaido and Tohoku Regional Governors Association
  - Hokkaido, Aomori Prefecture, Iwate Prefecture, Miyagi Prefecture, Akita Prefecture, Yamagata Prefecture, Fukushima Prefecture, Niigata Prefecture
- Kanto Region Governors Association
  - Ibaraki Prefecture, Tochigi Prefecture, Gunma Prefecture, Saitama Prefecture, Chiba Prefecture, Tokyo, Kanagawa Prefecture, Yamanashi Prefecture, Nagano Prefecture, Shizuoka Prefecture
- North Kanto Banetsu Five Prefecture Governors Conference
  - Fukushima Prefecture, Ibaraki Prefecture, Tochigi Prefecture, Gunma Prefecture, Niigata Prefecture
- Chubu Region Governors' Conference
  - Toyama Prefecture, Ishikawa Prefecture, Fukui Prefecture, Yamanashi Prefecture, Nagano Prefecture, Gifu Prefecture, Shizuoka Prefecture, Aichi Prefecture, Mie Prefecture, Shiga Prefecture
- Kinki Block Governors Association
  - Fukui Prefecture, Mie Prefecture, Shiga Prefecture, Kyoto Prefecture, Osaka Prefecture, Hyogo Prefecture, Nara Prefecture, Wakayama Prefecture, Tottori Prefecture, Tokushima Prefecture
- Shikoku Governors' Association
  - Tokushima Prefecture, Kagawa Prefecture, Ehime Prefecture, Kochi Prefecture
- Kyushu Regional Governors Association
  - Yamaguchi Prefecture, Fukuoka Prefecture, Saga Prefecture, Nagasaki Prefecture, Kumamoto Prefecture, Oita Prefecture, Miyazaki Prefecture, Kagoshima Prefecture, Okinawa Prefecture

== Former Chairmen ==
The term of office for the chairman is two years. Since 2003, the position has been selected by election from among candidates recommended by the five governors.

Former Chairmen
Number	Full name	Post	Term of office
1	Seiichiro Yasui	Tokyo	1947-10-1 - 1959-4-18
2	Ryutaro Higashi	Tokyo	1959-5-5 - 1967-4-22
3	Kuwahara Mikone	Aichi	1967-5-10 - 1975-2-14
4	Morie Kimura	Fukushima	1975-5-23 - 1976-8-2
5	Ryozo Okuda	Nara	1976-8-24 - 1980-7-9
6	Shunichi Suzuki	Tokyo	1980-7-18 - 1995-4-22
7	Shiro Nagano	Okayama	1995-5-23 - 1996-11-11
8	Yoshihiko Tsuchiya	Saitama	1996-11-21 - 2003-7-18
9	Taku Kajiwara	Gifu	2003-9-12 - 2005-2-2
10	Wataru Asō	Fukuoka	2005-2-17 - 2011-4-22
11	Keiji Yamada	Kyoto	2011-4-26 - 2018-4-15
12	Kiyoshi Ueda	Saitama	2018-4-17 - 2019-8-30
13	Kamon Iizumi	Tokushima	2019-9-3 - 2021-9-2
14	Shinji Hirai	Tottori Prefecture	2021-9-3 - 2023-9-2
15	Yoshihiro Murai	Miyagi	2023-9-3 -

== Location of the Secretariat ==
- Prefectural Hall (6th and 3rd floors), 2-6-3 Hirakawacho, Chiyoda-ku, Tokyo

== Meeting ==
- National Governors Conference: Held twice a year (July and December).
- Chairman and Vice-Chairman Conference

== See also ==
- National Governors' Association
