= Tokyo 15th district =

Electoral district in Tokyo, Japan

Tokyo 15th District
- 東京都第15区
- Parliamentary constituency for the Japanese House of Representatives
- Prefecture: Tokyo
- Proportional Block: Tokyo
- Electorate: 427,908 (as of September 2022)

Current constituency
- Created: 1994
- Seats: One
- Representative: Kōki Ōzora

Tokyo 15th District (東京都第15区, Tokyo-to jugo-ku) is an electoral district of the Japanese House of Representatives. The district was established in 1994 as part of the change to single-member districts.

== Areas covered ==
=== Current district ===
As of 13 January 2023, the areas covered by this district are as follows:

- Kōtō, since the creation of the district

== Elected representatives ==
| Representative | Party | Years served | Notes |
|---|---|---|---|
| Koji Kakizawa | LDP | 1996–1999 | Redistricted from the former 15th district. Resigned his seat to run in the 1999 Tokyo gubernatorial election. |
| Ben Kimura | LDP | 1999–2000 | Lost re-election. |
| Koji Kakizawa | Ind. | 2000–2003 | Retired from politics. |
| Ben Kimura | LDP | 2003–2009 | Lost re-election. |
| Shozo Azuma | DPJ | 2009–2012 | |
| Shozo Azuma | PLF | 2012 | |
| Shozo Azuma | TPJ | 2012 | Lost re-election. |
| Mito Kakizawa | Your | 2012–2013 | |
| Mito Kakizawa | Ind. | 2013 | |
| Mito Kakizawa | Unity | 2013–2014 | |
| Mito Kakizawa | JIP | 2014–2016 | Re-elected in 2014. |
| Mito Kakizawa | DP | 2016–2017 | |
| Mito Kakizawa | Kibō | 2017 | Re-elected in the Tokyo PR block. |
| Tsukasa Akimoto | LDP | 2017–2021 | Resigned mid-term. |
| Mito Kakizawa | Ind. | 2021–2024 | Resigned mid-term. |
| Natsumi Sakai | CDP | 2024–2026 | Lost re-election. |
| Kōki Ōzora | LDP | 2026– | |

== Election results ==
‡ - Also ran in the Tokyo PR district election

‡‡ - Also ran and won in the Tokyo PR district election

2026
| Party | Candidate | Votes | % | ±% |
|---|---|---|---|---|
| LDP | Kōki Ōzora | 109,489 | 42.5 | ▲16.6 |
| Centrist Reform | Natsumi Sakai | 70,991 | 27.5 | Steady |
| DPP | Saaya Fukami | 28,674 | 11.1 | New |
| Ishin | Yurika Mitsugi | 26,546 | 10.3 | New |
| Sanseitō | Kana Suzuki | 14,770 | 5.7 | New |
| Genzei–Yukoku | Toshiaki Yoshino | 7,296 | 2.8 | New |
| Turnout | | 257,766 | 60.88 | ▲3.30 |
| Registered electors | | 432,742 | | |
| LDP gain from Centrist Reform | | Swing | ▲8.3 | |

2024
| Party | Candidate | Votes | % | ±% |
|---|---|---|---|---|
| CDP | Natsumi Sakai | 66,791 | 27.5 | ▼1.5 |
| Independent | Genki Sudo | 65,666 | 27.1 | ▲9.7 |
| LDP | Kōki Ōzora^{‡‡} | 62,771 | 25.9 | |
| Independent | Yui Kanazawa | 32,442 | 13.4 | |
| JCP | Azuma Kozutsumi | 15,049 | 6.2 | |
| Turnout | | | 57.58 | ▲16.88 |
| CDP hold | | | | |

The 2024 by-election in the constituency was called following the arrest and a court ruling of the former LDP state minister Mito Kakizawa, who was arrested and found guilty on vote buying charges.

The voter turnout was 40.70%, 18.03% lower than the previous election's 58.73%, marking the constituency's lowest.

2024 by-election
| Party | Candidate | Votes | % | ±% |
|---|---|---|---|---|
| CDP | Natsumi Sakai (Supported by the JCP, SDP) | 49,476 | 29.0 | ▲4.2 |
| Independent | Genki Sudo (Endorsed by Reiwa Shinsengumi) | 29,669 | 17.4 | New |
| Ishin | Yui Kanazawa (Endorsed by FEFA) | 28,461 | 16.7 | ▼2.1 |
| CPJ | Akari Iiyama | 24,264 | 14.2 | New |
| Independent | Hirotada Ototake (Endorsed by FnK, DPP) | 19,655 | 11.5 | New |
| Sanseitō | Rina Yoshikawa | 8,639 | 5.1 | New |
| Independent | Tsukasa Akimoto | 8,061 | 4.7 | New |
| Anti-NHK | Katsuya Fukunaga | 1,410 | 0.8 | New |
| Tsubasa | Ryosuke Nemoto | 1,110 | 0.7 | New |
| Registered electors | | 430,285 | | |
| Turnout | | 175,126 | 40.7 | ▼18.0 |
| CDP gain from Independent | | | | |

2021
| Party | Candidate | Votes | % | ±% |
|---|---|---|---|---|
| Independent | Mito Kakizawa (incumbent - Tokyo PR) (endorsed by the LDP) | 76,251 | 32.0 | New |
| CDP | Masae Ido^{‡} (endorsed by the SDP) | 58,978 | 24.8 | New |
| Ishin | Yui Kanazawa^{‡} | 44,882 | 18.8 | New |
| Independent | Hiroshi Imamura (endorsed by the LDP) | 26,628 | 11.2 | New |
| Independent | Takashi Ino | 17,514 | 7.4 | ▲0.3 |
| Japan First | Makoto Sakurai | 9,449 | 4.0 | New |
| Independent | Koji Yoshida | 4,608 | 1.9 | New |
| Registered electors | | 424,125 | | |
| Turnout | | 249,089 | 58.7 | ▲3.1 |
| Independent gain from LDP | | | | |

2017
| Party | Candidate | Votes | % | ±% |
|---|---|---|---|---|
| LDP | Tsukasa Akimoto^{‡} (incumbent - Tokyo PR) (endorsed by Komeito) | 101,155 | 45.6 | ▲5.6 |
| Kibō no Tō | Mito Kakizawa^{‡‡} (incumbent) | 70,325 | 31.7 | New |
| JCP | Toshio Yoshida | 34,943 | 15.7 | ▲1.1 |
| Independent | Takashi Ino | 15,667 | 7.4 | ▲2.9 |
| Registered electors | | 412,336 | | |
| Turnout | | 229,218 | 55.6 | ▼0.4 |
| LDP gain from Ishin | | Swing | ▲7.3 | |

2014
| Party | Candidate | Votes | % | ±% |
|---|---|---|---|---|
| Ishin | Mito Kakizawa^{‡} (incumbent) (endorsed by the JRP) | 88.507 | 41.3 | New |
| LDP | Tsukasa Akimoto^{‡‡} (incumbent - Tokyo PR) (endorsed by Komeito) | 85,714 | 40.0 | ▲9.0 |
| JCP | Toshio Yoshida | 31,384 | 14.6 | ▲6.8 |
| Independent | Takashi Ino | 8,759 | 4.1 | New |
| Registered electors | | 395,474 | | |
| Turnout | | 221,584 | 56.0 | ▼8.1 |
| Ishin gain from Your | | Swing | | |

2012
| Party | Candidate | Votes | % | ±% |
|---|---|---|---|---|
| Your | Mito Kakizawa^{‡} (incumbent - Tokyo PR) (endorsed by the JRP) | 88,222 | 36.9 | ▲21.2 |
| LDP | Tsukasa Akimoto^{‡‡} (endorsed by Komeito) | 74,159 | 31.0 | ▼1.3 |
| Democratic | Mieko Tanaka^{‡} | 29,355 | 12.3 | ▼30.1 |
| JCP | Toshio Yoshida | 18,667 | 7.8 | ▼1.1 |
| Tomorrow | Shozo Azuma^{‡} (incumbent) (endorsed by the NDP) | 15,667 | 7.4 | New |
| Registered electors | | 386,411 | | |
| Turnout | | 247,496 | 64.1 | ▼3.2 |
| Your gain from Democratic | | Swing | ▲10.6 | |

2009
| Party | Candidate | Votes | % | ±% |
|---|---|---|---|---|
| Democratic | Shozo Azuma^{‡} | 105,131 | 42.4 | ▲7.2 |
| LDP | Ben Kimura^{‡} (incumbent) (endorsed by Komeito) | 80,054 | 32.3 | ▼22.2 |
| Your | Mito Kakizawa^{‡‡} | 38.808 | 15.7 | New |
| JCP | Toshio Yoshida | 22,176 | 8.9 | ▼1.6 |
| Registered electors | | 375,924 | | |
| Turnout | | 229,218 | 67.3 | ▲0.8 |
| Democratic gain from LDP | | Swing | ▲6.7 | |

2005
| Party | Candidate | Votes | % | ±% |
|---|---|---|---|---|
| LDP | Ben Kimura^{‡} (incumbent - Tokyo PR) (endorsed by Komeito) | 123,021 | 54.4 | ▲5.6 |
| Democratic | Shozo Azuma^{‡} (incumbent) | 79,621 | 35.2 | ▲5.2 |
| JCP | Toshio Yoshida | 23,659 | 10.5 | ▲0.5 |
| Registered electors | | 348,023 | | |
| Turnout | | 231,331 | 66.5 | ▲6.1 |
| LDP hold | | Swing | ▲6.5 | |

2003
| Party | Candidate | Votes | % | ±% |
|---|---|---|---|---|
| LDP | Ben Kimura^{‡} | 69,164 | 35.4 | ▲7.3 |
| Democratic | Shozo Azuma^{‡} (incumbent - Tokyo PR) | 58,616 | 30.0 | ▲15.3 |
| Independent Society | Koji Kakizawa | 47,843 | 24.5 | New |
| JCP | Haruta Atsuyuki | 19,610 | 10.0 | ▼5.6 |
| Registered electors | | 332,572 | | |
| Turnout | | 200,707 | 60.4 | ▼2.1 |
| LDP gain from Independent | | Swing | ▲15.1 | |

2000
| Party | Candidate | Votes | % | ±% |
|---|---|---|---|---|
| Independent | Koji Kakizawa | 54,298 | 28.8 | ▲5.6 |
| LDP | Ben Kimura^{‡} (incumbent) | 52,892 | 28.1 | ▼22.9 |
| JCP | Haruta Atsuyuki | 29,412 | 15.6 | ▼2.9 |
| Democratic | Tatsuharu Mawatari^{‡} | 27,654 | 14.7 | ▼15.8 |
| Liberal | Shozo Azuma^{‡‡} | 22,800 | 12.1 | New |
| Independent | Kaoru Kondo | 1,302 | 0.7 | New |
| Registered electors | | 309,356 | | |
| Turnout | | 193,348 | 62.5 | |
| Independent gain from LDP | | Swing | N/A | |

1999 by-election
| Party | Candidate | Votes | % | ±% |
|---|---|---|---|---|
| LDP | Ben Kimura | 89,605 | 51.0 | ▲14.6 |
| Democratic | Kazuko Yoshida | 53,490 | 30.5 | New |
| JCP | Muneharu Fusa | 32,541 | 18.5 | ▲0.8 |
| Registered electors | | | | |
| Turnout | | | | |
| LDP hold | | Swing | ▲7.3 | |

1996
| Party | Candidate | Votes | % | ±% |
|---|---|---|---|---|
| LDP | Koji Kakizawa^{‡} (incumbent - former Tokyo 6th) | 61,701 | 36.4 | New |
| New Frontier | Akira Kuroyanagi | 46,969 | 27.7 | New |
| JCP | Muneharu Fusa | 29,901 | 17.7 | New |
| Democratic | Noboru Osawa | 28,181 | 16.6 | New |
| Independent | Yoshihisa Kitaura | 2,629 | 1.6 | New |
| Registered electors | | 293,912 | | |
| Turnout | | 173,731 | 59.1 | New |
| LDP win (new seat) | | | | |
