= 1967 Tokyo gubernatorial election =

- 15 April 1967
- Turnout: 67.49% (▼0.25pp)
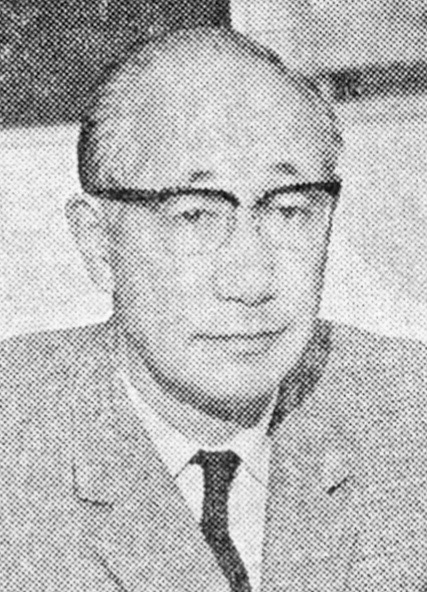

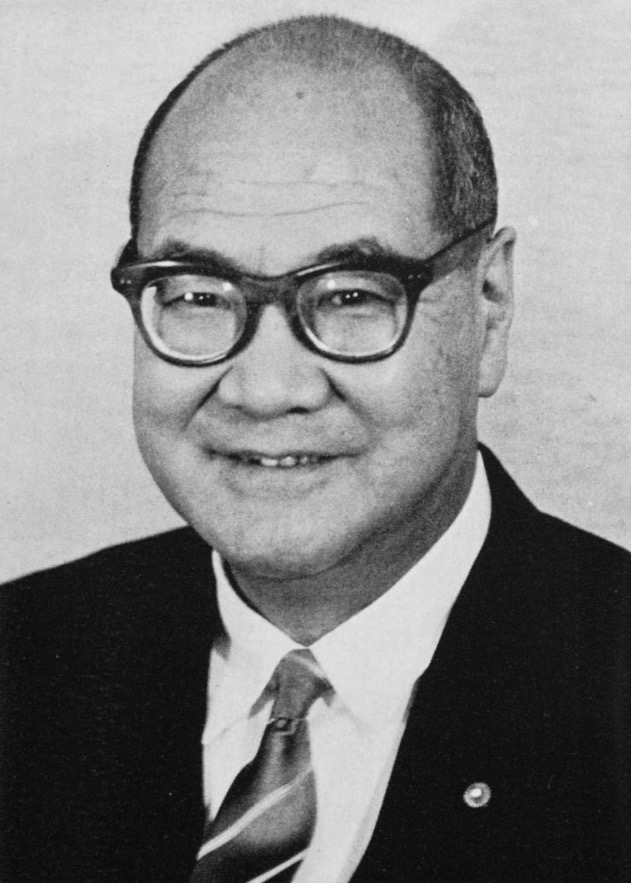

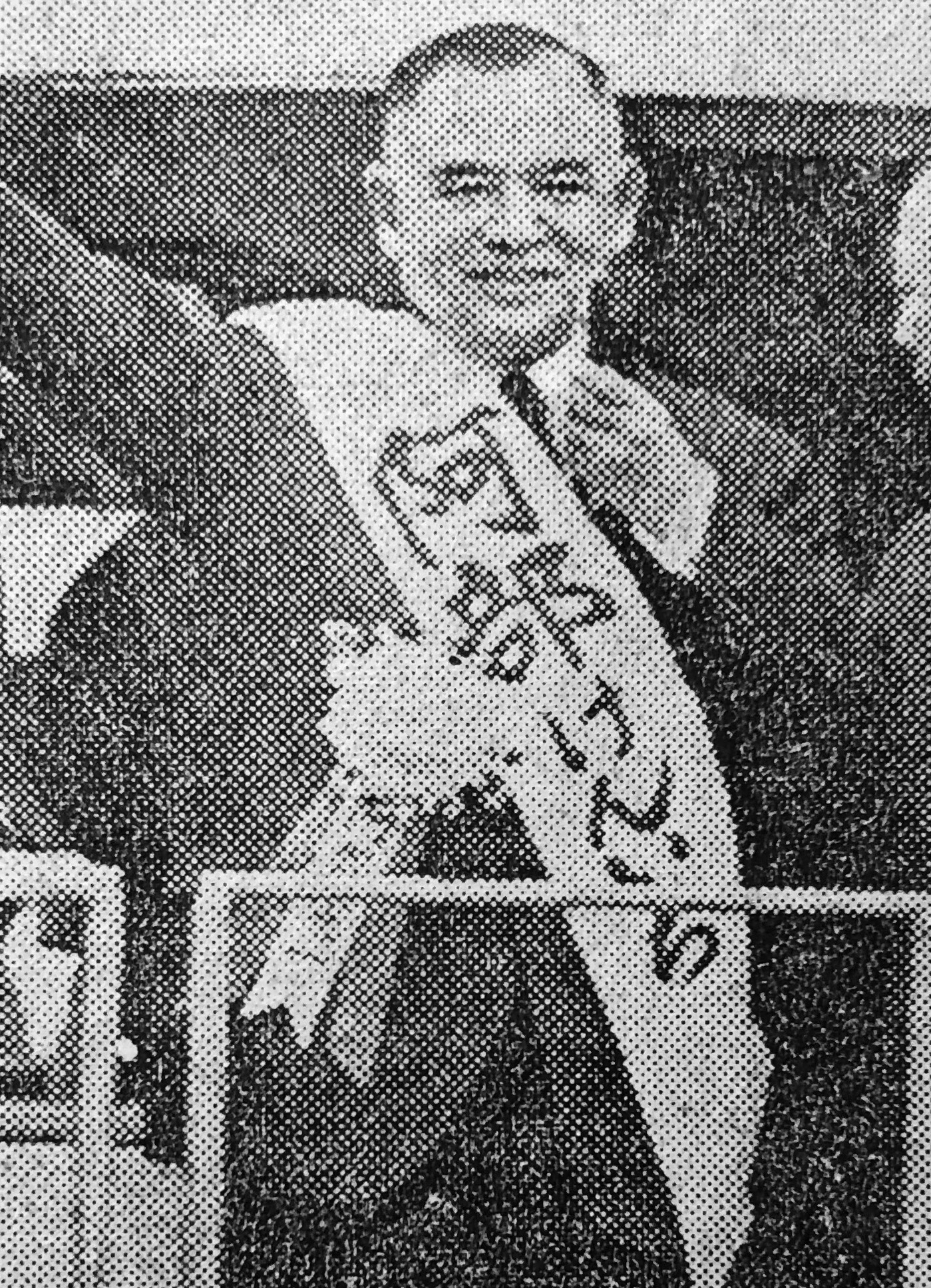
Candidate	Ryokichi Minobe	Masatoshi Matsushita	Kenichi Abe
Party	Independent	Independent	Independent
Popular vote	2,200,389	2,063,752	601,527
Percentage	44.46%	41.70%	12.15%
Supported by	JSP, JCP	LDP, DSP	Komeito
Governor before election
Ryutaro Azuma
Independent
Elected Governor
Ryokichi Minobe
Independent

The 1967 Tokyo gubernatorial election took place on 15 April 1967 to elect the Governor of Tokyo. Professor and economist Ryokichi Minobe, endorsed by the Japan Socialist Party and Japanese Communist Party, was elected. The runner-up in a close contest was Masatoshi Matsushita, president of Rikkyo University, who was endorsed by the Liberal Democratic Party and Democratic Socialist Party. Kenichi Abe, candidate of the Komeito, placed a distant third.

== Background ==
Conservative Ryotaro Azuma had served as governor since 1959 and oversaw the 1964 Summer Olympics held in the city.

Trade union leader Kaoru Ōta had previously announced his candidacy for the Japan Socialist Party, but renounced it in February 1967 after the party performed poorly in the House of Representative election. Party secretary Tomomi Narita drew up a shortlist of five names of possible candidates, among which was economics professor Ryokichi Minobe from the Tokyo University of Education. Minobe was respected and well-connected, and also had a public profile from hosting an NHK program on economics. Narita, together with Yokohama mayor Ichio Asukata and Minobe's mentor Ōuchi Hyōei, approached Minobe about running, but his response was noncommittal: "I'm not saying I won't run, but I can't say now that I will." He said that being an academic suited him better than being a politician. After several more approaches from the party in the following days, Minobe agreed to run on the 19th. He quickly secured the support of Ichikawa Fusae and the League of Women Voters of Japan. The Communist Party also withdrew their candidate, Yonahara Akita, and endorsed Minobe.

Meanwhile, the centrist Democratic Socialist Party had secured the candidacy of Masatoshi Matsushita, president of Rikkyo University and chairman of the DSP-aligned Council on the Prohibition of Nuclear Weapons. They sought joint endorsement from the LDP and JSP, but the JSP was already seeking out Minobe and rebuffed them. The DSP in turn refused to support Minobe due to his Marxist views. The LDP likewise were close to deciding on their own candidate, Suzuki Shunichi, but intervention by Prime Minister Eisaku Satō resulted in an endorsement of Matsushita instead.

The Komeito elected to run their own independent candidate, nominating Kenichi Abe.

== Campaign ==
Prime Minister Satō campaigned heavily with Matsushita, and he was endorsed by outgoing mayor Ryutaro Azuma. Matsushita warned that "Tokyo will be in flames in a communist revolution" if Minobe were elected. He developed pneumonia late in the campaign, and was forced to limit his campaign appearances until recovering in the final few days.

Minobe campaigned on the slogan "blue skies for Tokyo" and called for renewal of city administration. The campaign utilised the colour light blue, which featured on material and distributed promotional badges. Minobe benefited from a positive and friendly image, becoming known for his "Minobe smile".

Both candidates received numerous endorsements from celebrities and cultural figures. Among the most notable was artist Osamu Tezuka, who drew the cover for Minobe's campaign pamphlet.

On the eve of the election, The Asahi Shimbun showed Minobe with a slight lead in opinion polling.

== Results ==
1967 Tokyo gubernatorial election
Party	Candidate	Votes	%
Independent (JSP, JCP)	Ryokichi Minobe	2,200,389	44.46
Independent (LDP, DSP)	Masatoshi Matsushita	2,063,752	41.70
Independent (Komeito)	Kenichi Abe	601,527	12.15
Liberal Democrat Friends	Kiyoyuki Watanabe	42,867	0.87
Greater Japan Patriotic Party	Bin Akao	16,241	0.33
National Alliance for the Support of Parliamentary Politics	Wataru Shimizu	10,513	0.21
Independent	Yoshikazu Kubo	8,384	0.17
Alliance for the Support of Politics and Finance in the Capital	Taketoshi Nonogami	2,238	0.05
Japan National Congress for a World Federation	Seijiro Kiyosaku	2,184	0.04
Independent	Sanesada Yonamine	903	0.02
Total valid votes		4,948,998	100.00
Turnout		5,016,522	67.49
