= Koji Kakizawa =

Japanese politician (1933–2009)

Kōji Kakizawa
- 柿澤 弘治
- Kakizawa in 1993

Minister for Foreign Affairs
- In office 28 April 1994 – 30 June 1994
- Prime Minister: Tsutomu Hata
- Preceded by: Tsutomu Hata
- Succeeded by: Yōhei Kōno

Member of the House of Representatives
- In office 26 June 2000 – 10 October 2003
- Preceded by: Ben Kimura
- Succeeded by: Ben Kimura
- Constituency: Tokyo 15th
- In office 23 June 1980 – 25 March 1999
- Preceded by: Shizue Yamaguchi
- Succeeded by: Ben Kimura
- Constituency: Tokyo 6th (1980–1996); Tokyo 15th (1996–1999)

Member of the House of Councillors
- In office 11 July 1977 – 9 June 1980
- Preceded by: Sanzō Nosaka
- Succeeded by: Isao Naitō
- Constituency: Tokyo at-large

Personal details
- Born: 26 November 1933 Tokyo, Japan
- Died: 27 January 2009 (aged 75) Chūō, Tokyo, Japan
- Party: Liberal Democratic
- Other political affiliations: NLC (1977–1983); Liberal League (1994–1995)
- Spouse: Eiko Kakizawa
- Children: Mito Kakizawa
- Education: University of Tokyo

Koji Kakizawa (柿澤 弘治, Kakizawa Kōji; 26 November 1933 – 27 January 2009) was a Japanese politician who served as Japan's Minister for Foreign Affairs in 1994. After his death, he was conferred the Junior Third Rank, Grand Cordon of the Order of the Rising Sun.

After graduating from the University of Tokyo, Faculty of Economics, Kakizawa worked as a bureaucrat within the Ministry of Finance before entering politics. During his enrollment in the ministry, Kakizawa was transferred to the Ministry of Foreign Affairs and Economic Planning Agency. He was first elected to the House of Councillors in 1977 as a member of the New Liberal Club (NLC), which is now defunct. He moved to the House of Representatives of Japan beginning in 1980. Kakizawa then left the NLC in order to join the Liberal Democratic Party (LDP).

In 1994, Kakizawa defected from the Liberal Democratic Party (LDP) in order to help found the now-defunct Liberal Party that same year. He held the post of Foreign Minister of Japan for about two months in 1994 within the coalition government of Prime Minister Tsutomu Hata. Hata's government had excluded the LDP from power.

Kakizawa rejoined the Liberal Democratic Party (LDP) in 1995.

Kakizawa unsuccessfully ran for Governor of Tokyo in the 1999 election after being expelled from the LDP. He continued to serve a total of seven terms within the Japanese House of Representatives until his retirement in 2003.

Koji Kakizawa died of esophagus cancer on 27 January 2009, at the age of 75 at a hospital in Tokyo. His son Mito Kakizawa became a member of the Diet later that year.

Political offices
Preceded by Tsutomu Hata	Minister for Foreign Affairs of Japan; 1994	Succeeded by Yōhei Kōno
Party political offices
Preceded by -	Representative of Liberal League; 1994	Succeeded by Koki Ishii
