= Natsumi Sakai =

Natsumi Sakai may refer to:

- Natsumi Sakai (swimmer)
- Natsumi Sakai (politician)
