= Tsukasa Akimoto =

Japanese politician

- 秋元 司
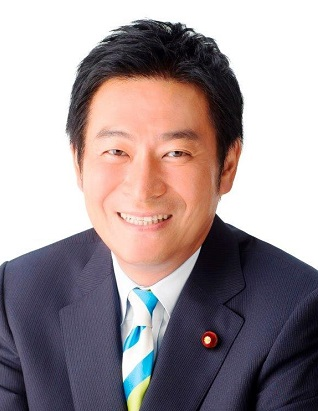
- Official portrait, 2018

Member of the House of Representatives
- In office 21 December 2012 – 14 October 2021
- Preceded by: Multi-member district
- Succeeded by: Mito Kakizawa
- Constituency: Tokyo PR (2012–2017); Tokyo 15th (2017–2021)

Member of the House of Councillors
- In office July 2004 – July 2010
- Constituency: National PR

Personal details
- Born: 23 October 1971 (age 54) Adachi, Tokyo, Tokyo
- Party: Independent
- Other political affiliations: Liberal Democratic
- Education: Daito Bunka University

Tsukasa Akimoto (秋元 司, Akimoto Tsukasa; born October 23, 1971) is a former Japanese politician of the Liberal Democratic Party, who served in the House of Councillors and the House of Representatives. A native of Adachi, Tokyo, he graduated from Daito Bunka University.

== Career ==
After working as a secretary in the office of Diet member Kōki Kobayashi Akimoto became a member of the House of Councillors in the Diet between 2004 and 2010 running in the national PR block. He was a member of the House of Representatives between 2012 and 2021 running in the Tokyo 15th district and served as a deputy minister in the Third and Fourth Abe Cabinet.

=== Bribery scandal ===
Late December 2019, Akimoto was arrested for allegedly receiving up to ¥7.6 million in bribes from 500.com, a Chinese gambling operator interested in setting up a casino in the country. On September 7, 2021, the court sentenced him to four years in prison and fined the amount equal to the bribes he had received. He was also found guilty of offering to bribe witnesses to falsify their court testimony. In March 2024, the sentence was upheld in the Tokyo High Court but the case is pending further appeal.

== See also ==
- China–Japan relations
