= Kōki Ōzora =

Japanese social entrepreneur and politician

- 大空 幸星
- Official portrait, 2024

Member of the House of Representatives
- Incumbent
- Assumed office 11 November 2024
- Constituency: Tokyo PR (2024–2026); Tokyo 15th (2026–present)
Junior ministerial offices
Parliamentary Vice-Minister for Foreign Affairs
Incumbent
Assumed office 17 September 2026
Prime Minister	Sanae Takaichi
Preceded by	Arfiya Eri

Personal details
- Born: 26 November 1998 (age 27) Matsuyama, Ehime, Japan
- Party: Liberal Democratic
- Education: Keio University

Kōki Ōzora (大空 幸星, Ōzora Kōki, born 26 November 1998) is a Japanese social activist and politician serving as Liberal Democratic Member of the House of Representatives since 2024. Since 2026, he has been Parliamentary Vice-Minister of Foreign Affairs in the Second Takaichi cabinet.

He is best known for creating Anata no Ibasho, a chat consultation app intended to prevent loneliness experienced by young people. Before entering electoral politics, Ōzora worked in the Cabinet Secretariat's Study Group on Grasping the Reality of Loneliness and Isolation, and worked with Children and Families Agency, specializing in youth loneliness.

At the age of 27, he is currently the youngest Parliamentary Vice-Minister in the history of Japan.

== Biography ==
=== Early life ===
Kōki Ōzora was born on 26 November 1998 in Ehime Prefecture, graduating from the Faculty of Policy Management at Keio University (SFC). While at university, he joined a seminar ran by the Fukushima Prefectural Police and conducted research on measures to combat loneliness in Japan. Ōzora says that he was neglected by his parents and he considered suicide several times while in high school, but that a supportive teacher helped and encouraged him, describing coming across him as "a miracle" that saved his life.

=== Anata no Ibasho ===
In 2020, during his time at university, Ōzora founded the non-profit chat consultation service, A Place For You, otherwise known as Your Place To Be (Anata no Ibasho; あなたのいばしょ), the first such service in Japan that is available 24 hours a day, 365 days a year, and free of charge. He said he founded the service, which is volunteer-run, to help create "a society where people can reliably access trustworthy people" and to help prevent loneliness amongst young people. By July 2024, it had handled over 1 million consultations. With approximately 1,000 counselors in 32 countries around the world, it is the largest chat consultation service in Japan, handling up to approximately 3,000 consultations per day.

"You don't need dreams or goals. Just living is enough for life. I'm not special. Anyone can be active. I don't want to change society. I just can't stand not taking action."

- Kōki Ōzora, 2022

In April 2021 Ōzora called for the creation of a Minister for Measures to Combat Loneliness and Isolation; he personally delivered the proposal to then-Chief Cabinet Secretary Katsunobu Kato. In February 2021, the Suga government established a new "Minister for Measures against Loneliness and Isolation" and a "Loneliness and Isolation Measures Office" within the Cabinet Secretariat. The Loneliness, Isolation and Loneliness Prevention Act was later enacted in May 2021. Ōzora says his efforts was inspired by the United Kingdom's Ministry of Loneliness as well as the work of House of Commons member Jo Cox.

Ōzora would go on to work with the Cabinet Secretariat's Study Group on Grasping the Reality of Loneliness and Isolation, later collaborating with Children and Families Agency to help with youth loneliness, which by then had become his speciality.

By 2023, Anata no Ibasho was listed as a registered service by the Ministry of Health.

After founding Anata no Ibasho, Ōzora was hoping to pursue graduate studies in the United Kingdom.

=== Political career ===
External video
- Ōzora campaign video filmed during the 2024 general election, October 10, 2024, 00:54, YouTube

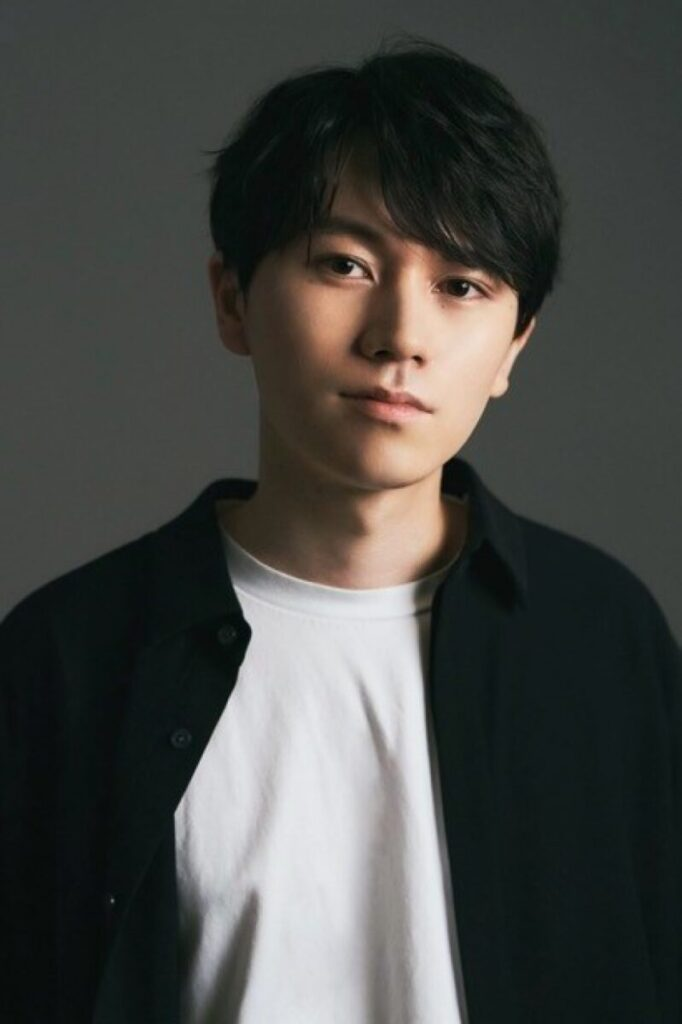
Ōzora in 2022.

In October 2024, Ōzora ran in the 2024 Japanese general election in Tokyo's 15th district, as a member of the Liberal Democratic Party. Ōzora, who had previously worked with the LDP-led governments of Yoshihide Suga and Fumio Kishida in his anti-loneliness efforts, announced his candidacy in September. He was joined on the campaign trail by Shinjiro Koizumi, who had come in third place in the LDP leadership election and had since been made chair of the party's Election Strategy Committee. He was also supported by Akie Abe, the widow of former Prime Minister Shinzo Abe, as well as LDP President and Prime Minister Shigeru Ishiba.

Ōzora lost in the single-seat constituency, coming in third place (the winner was Natsumi Sakai). However, Ōzora was also running in the proportional representation block for Tokyo. As the LDP won 23.6% of the vote in Tokyo, Ōzora was one of 5 LDP candidates who won a seat in the Diet from Tokyo. At the age of 25, Ōzora became the youngest member of the Diet. The Sankei Shimbun erroneously reported that Ōzora was the youngest member in the history of the House of Representatives (the title actually belonged to Yoko Hara, who was 25 years and 4 months old when she was elected in 2000). The article was later revised. He took office on 11 November 2024.

In 2025 he was made Secretary-General of the LDP's Project Team for Lowering the Candidate Age.

Ōzora was implicated in the gift certificate scandal, in which Prime Minister Shigeru Ishiba gave newly elected LDP MPs gift certificates at a dinner in March 2025. He stated that he immediately returned the gift certificate, worth about ¥100,000, to Ishiba's office.

He toured his local constituency with newly appointed Agriculture Minister Shinjiro Koizumi in May 2025.

During the 2025 Upper House election, Ōzora campaigned for Keizo Takemi, the oldest member of the House of Councilors. Takemi would ultimately lose his seat as a member for the Tokyo at-large district. The LDP lost its majority in the Upper House for the first time since 2007, leading to calls for Ishiba to resign as LDP President and Prime Minister. Ozora called for further reforms within the party, arguing that if young people did not feel adequate representation in the party that the party "won't change no matter who is at the top."

== Political positions ==
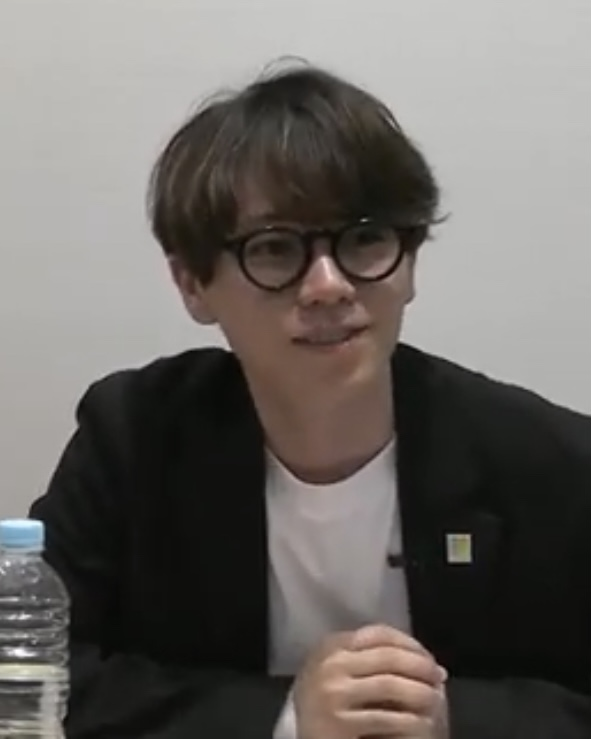
Ōzora in June 2024.

Ōzora has been critical of opposition parties before entering politics.

On social issues, he is opposed to the concept of a "female Emperor" and did not give a response when asked by NHK in a candidate survey if he supports same-sex marriage or allowing married couples to have separate surnames. He believes increasing the incomes of young people is the most effective way to increase the low birthrate.

He believes in maintaining nuclear power as a means of energy supply in Japan.

Ōzora has suggested that proactive fiscal spending should take precedence over fiscal discipline. Ōzora believes in maintaining the consumption tax at the current rate of 10%, as of 2025.

He is in favor of amending Article 9 of the Constitution to explicitly state the existence of the Self-Defense Forces. Regarding strengthening defense capabilities, he has stated that bolstering the armed forces is necessary but costs should be kept in check. Ōzora considered China to be an adversary of Japan. While he opposes Japan possessing nuclear weapons of its own, he believes that nuclear sharing should be considered.

He visited the Yasukuni Shrine in 2025, on the 80th Anniversary of the end of World War 2. The shrine has honored Class-A war criminals since 1978.

Like Shinjiro Koizumi, Ōzora does not support a ban on corporate donations to political parties. He supported the My Number card integration reforms implemented by then-Digital Minister Kono Taro during the Fumio Kishida administration.

== Personal life ==
Ōzora has a pet rabbit, a mixed breed he found at a supermarket, named Harp. He lives in Koto Ward of the Kantō region.

=== Awards ===
In August 2023, he was selected by Forbes as one of Japan's "30 Under 30 Who Are Changing the World".

== Electoral history ==
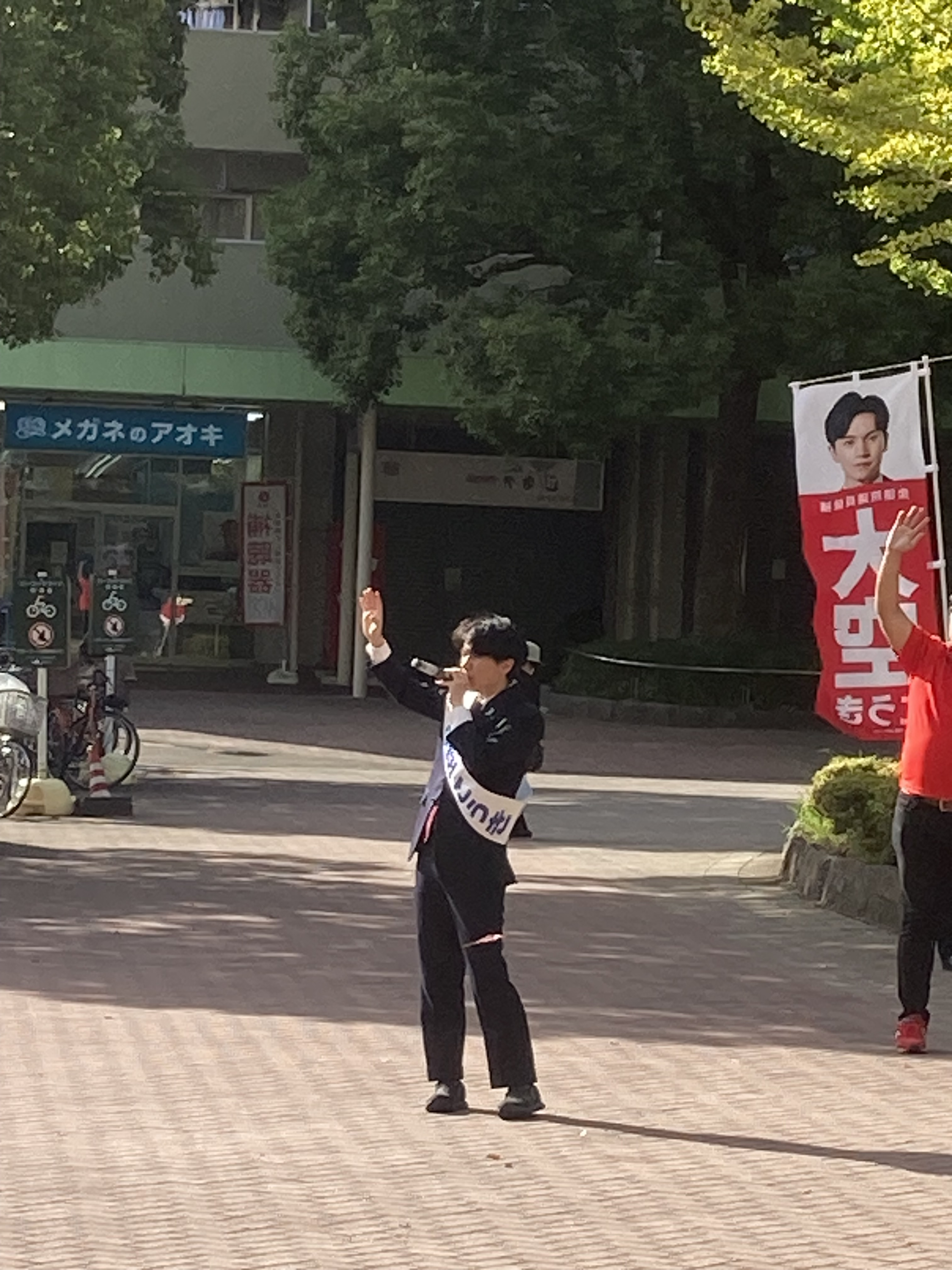
Ōzora delivering a speech during the 2024 general election campaign, October 2024.

‡‡ - Ran and won in the Tokyo PR district election

2024
Party	Candidate	Votes	%	±%
CDP	Natsumi Sakai	66,791	27.5	▼1.5
Independent	Genki Sudo	65,666	27.1	▲9.7
LDP	Kōki Ōzora ^{‡‡}	62,771	25.9	
Independent	Yui Kanazawa	32,442	13.4	
JCP	Azuma Kozutsumi	15,049	6.2	
Turnout			57.58	▲16.88
CDP hold				

2026
Party	Candidate	Votes	%	±%
LDP	Kōki Ōzora	109,489	42.5	▲16.6
Centrist Reform	Natsumi Sakai	70,991	27.5	Steady
DPP	Saaya Fukami	28,674	11.1	New
Ishin	Yurika Mitsugi	26,546	10.3	New
Sanseitō	Kana Suzuki	14,770	5.7	New
Genzei–Yukoku	Toshiaki Yoshino	7,296	2.8	New
Turnout		257,766	60.88	▲3.30
Registered electors		432,742		
LDP gain from Centrist Reform		Swing	▲8.3	

House of Representatives (Japan)
Preceded by n/a	Representative for Tokyo proportional representation block 2024–present	Incumbent
Party political offices
Preceded by Office established	Secretary-General of the Project Team for Lowering the Candidate Age, Liberal Democratic Party; 2025-present	Incumbent
