= Tokyo 1st district (1946) =

Tokyo 1st district (東京都第1区, Tōkyō-to dai-1-ku) was a former House of Representatives constituency in Japan. It existed only for the 22nd general election in 1946. It had 10 seats elected by limited vote (two votes per voter).

== District area ==
The constituency covered the following wards of Tokyo:

- Kojimachi Ward
- Kanda Ward
- Nihonbashi Ward
- Kyobashi Ward
- Shiba Ward
- Azabu Ward
- Akasaka Ward
- Yotsuya Ward
- Ushigome Ward
- Koishikawa Ward
- Hongo Ward
- Shitaya Ward
- Asakusa Ward
- Honjo Ward
- Fukagawa Ward
- Toshima Ward
- Takinogawa Ward
- Arakawa Ward
- Oji Ward
- Itabashi Ward
- Adachi Ward
- Mukojima Ward
- Joto Ward
- Katsushika Ward
- Edogawa Ward

== Election results ==
22nd Japanese general election (held April 10, 1946)

Eligible voters: 933,722 Voter turnout: % (change from previous: )

Status	Candidate	Age	Party	Incumbency	Votes	%
Elected	Ichirō Hatoyama		Liberal Party	Previous	106,872	%
Elected	Shizue Yamaguchi		Socialist Party	New	85,149	%
Elected	Sanzō Nosaka		Communist Party	New	80,897	%
Elected	Inejirō Asanuma		Socialist Party	Former	68,637	%
Elected	Shigeyo Takeuchi		Liberal Party	New	43,321	%
Elected	Moritoshi Nakajima		Liberal Party	Former	37,781	%
Elected	Kazumatsu Ishida		Minor parties	New	34,940	%
Elected	Senpachi Suzuki		Liberal Party	New	34,077	%
Elected	Hyōnosuke Hara		Socialist Party	New	31,307	%
Elected	Ren Hayashi		Progressive Party	New	29,895	%
Elected (elevated)	Ichirō Shimamura		Liberal Party	New	28,726	%
	Yasuyasu Morii		Socialist Party	New	23,186	%
	Kōgi Amano		Liberal Party	New	22,368	%
	Zengorō Shimakami		Socialist Party	New	21,998	%
	Torazō Kumamoto		Socialist Party	New	21,817	%
	Kiyau Kiuchi		Progressive Party	New	21,185	%
	Shigeo Kamiyama		Communist Party	New	20,513	%
	Ryūtarō Katō		Progressive Party	New	19,107	%
	Yoshio Sakurauchi		Progressive Party	New	17,267	%
	Chūzaburō Miura		Progressive Party	New	16,412	%
	Kōshichi Yamamoto		Liberal Party	New	14,852	%
	Takeo Kurokawa		Liberal Party	New	14,612	%
	Minoru Yoshida		Communist Party	New	12,865	%
	Yoshihiko Kitajima		Minor parties	New	12,552	%
	Jumatsu Onouchi		Independent	New	12,298	%
	Katsumasa Katagiri		Minor parties	New	10,807	%
	Katsuko Miyahigashi		Minor parties	New	10,649	%
	Shigeru Maruyama		Liberal Party	New	10,222	%
	Shichirō Yamada		Progressive Party	New	9,665	%
	Kaneto Nonomura		Minor parties	New	9,587	%
	Yūsuke Fushiguro		Communist Party	New	9,333	%
	Sadao Koyama		Independent	New	9,115	%
	Kagehisa Tōyama		Independent	New	9,032	%
	Yohachirō Yamaguchi		Progressive Party	New	8,953	%
	Kiyoshi Shiraishi		Minor parties	New	8,561	%
	Shun'ichi Nakata		Progressive Party	New	7,523	%
	Seiichi Yokose		Independent	New	7,166	%
	Kikutarō Suzuki		Minor parties	New	7,138	%
	Kikuko Yamane		Cooperative Party	New	7,042	%
	Hiyoshiji Mano		Independent	New	6,809	%
	Nijūshirō Mori		Minor parties	New	6,711	%
	Kōtarō Itō		Liberal Party	New	6,697	%
	Motozō Udagawa		Minor parties	New	6,332	%
	Risaburō Ono		Progressive Party	New	6,239	%
	Hideo Yahagi		Minor parties	New	6,135	%
	Jōtarō Araki		Progressive Party	New	5,990	%
	Chōzō Yamamoto		Minor parties	New	5,783	%
	Harushige Sekihara		Liberal Party	New	5,392	%
	Toshirō Okazaki		Socialist Party	New	5,261	%
	Sasuke Hanada		Independent	New	4,669	%
	Seisaku Ōsaki		Liberal Party	New	4,428	%
	Taketoshi Nonoue		Independent	New	4,406	%
	Issei Uchikoga		Independent	New	3,921	%
	Teruko Shimizu		Minor parties	New	3,660	%
	Seiei Tanimura		Independent	New	3,483	%
	Masayoshi Tanaka		Minor parties	New	3,374	%
	Fukuhisa Kaneko		Minor parties	New	3,274	%
	Tsuneta Tabayashi		Socialist Party	New	3,263	%
	Hirokuni Asanuma		Independent	New	3,128	%
	Isamu Saijō		Independent	New	3,093	%
	Tokuji Yasuda		Liberal Party	New	3,012	%
	Toshio Iijima		Liberal Party	New	2,910	%
	Toshio Konyo		Cooperative Party	New	2,726	%
	Chō Kamiki		Independent	New	2,559	%
	Tajirō Shimada		Progressive Party	New	2,540	%
	Yoshi Saitō		Minor parties	New	2,425	%
	Kyōnosuke Ōhashi		Independent	New	2,400	%
	Saichi Suzuki		Independent	New	2,374	%
	Tadashi Tsuda		Cooperative Party	New	2,195	%
	Tōzaemon Chiba		Socialist Party	New	2,095	%
	Yasutoshi Maki		Liberal Party	New	1,953	%
	Kikuo Misawa		Minor parties	New	1,904	%
	Miyomatsu Itō		Independent	New	1,820	%
	Nobukazu Yamazaki		Independent	New	1,819	%
	Hideaki Ōbayashi		Independent	New	1,780	%
	Tokuzō Kitami		Independent	New	1,707	%
	Kensuke Takahashi		Minor parties	New	1,390	%
	Masatoshi Yamaguchi		Independent	New	1,387	%
	Yutaka Suzuki		Minor parties	New	1,346	%
	Tomiji Shibata		Independent	New	1,293	%
	Yūei Horikoshi		Minor parties	New	1,193	%
	Kōji Tokiwa		Cooperative Party	New	1,180	%
	Matsutarō Terasaki		Socialist Party	New	1,149	%
	Tokutarō Iijima		Liberal Party	New	1,119	%
	Nichiaki Okazaki		Independent	New	1,093	%
	Takeo Yamada		Minor parties	New	1,074	%
	Ichisaburō Nakamura		Minor parties	New	976	%
	Katsunari Sasaki		Minor parties	New	850	%
	Chiharu Sakurai		Independent	New	663	%
	Kuninobu Yanagise		Independent	New	661	%
	Yokichi Kitahara		Independent	New	655	%
	Satoshi Fujiwara		Progressive Party	New	643	%
	Nobuhisa Yamamoto		Minor parties	New	636	%
	Hiyoshi Yoda		Independent	New	575	%
	Hatsutarō Nakano		Independent	New	544	%
	Sekiji Aoki		Independent	New	524	%
	Tomohiro Mamata		Minor parties	New	506	%
	Morihō Araki		Minor parties	New	426	%
	Shōichirō Chiba		Minor parties	New	384	%
	Ichirō Takano		Independent	New	347	%
	Yasunosuke Sasaki		Minor parties	New	319	%
	Masaharu Hara		Independent	New	317	%
	Ken'ichi Tako		Independent	New	306	%
	Shōjirō Takagi		Independent	New	276	%
	Kyōzō Akita		Progressive Party	New	258	%
	Yonetarō Fujizuka		Independent	New	253	%
	Taneyuki Sōgetsu		Independent	New	246	%
	Kimihiko Satō		Independent	New	244	%
	Satoshi Harada		Independent	New	242	%
	Yoshikatsu Uesugi		Independent	New	231	%
	Mineichi Murakami		Independent	New	217	%
	Takaharu Yushiba		Independent	New	212	%
	Giichi Yamagishi		Minor parties	New	204	%
	Tatsuo Shishijima		Progressive Party	New	186	%
	Yasuo Yasui		Minor parties	New	181	%
	Shigeru Takatsuki		Independent	New	173	%
	Fumio Kamata		Independent	New	158	%
	Masanao Watabe		Minor parties	New	139	%
	Tomohiro Furuya		Minor parties	New	103	%
	Kōjirō Takabatake		Independent	New	101	%

- On May 7, 1946, Ichirō Hatoyama was purged from public office. Runner-up Ichirō Shimamura was elevated to elected status.
