= Kanagawa 20th district =

Legislative district of Japan

Kanagawa 20th District
- Single-member district constituency for the National Diet
- Map of single-member constituencies in Kanagawa Prefecture
- Electorate: 345,518 (as of June 1, 2023)

Current constituency
- Created: 2022
- Seats: One
- Party: LDP
- Representatives: Yui Kanazawa

Kanagawa 20th district is a single-member constituency of the House of Representatives, the lower house of the National Diet of Japan. The district was created as part of the 2022 reapportionments that added two districts to Kanagawa Prefecture because of relative increases in population in the prefecture. Sayuri Otsuka became the first representative as a result of the 2024 general election; defeating Akira Amari, former LDP Secretary-General.

== Area ==
- Minami ward of Sagamihara city
- Zama city

Minami ward had previously been split between the 14th and 16th districts and Zama had been a part of the 13th district.

== Elected representatives ==
Representative	Party	Years served	Notes
Sayuri Otsuka	CDP	2024 – 2026	
Yui Kanazawa	LDP	2026 –	

== Election results ==
2026
Party	Candidate	Votes	%	±%
LDP	Yui Kanazawa	91,240	49.5	▲14.0
Centrist Reform	Sayuri Otsuka	66,964	36.3	▼10.5
Ishin	Yōichi Kaneko	26,061	14.1	▼3.6
Registered electors		344,851		
Turnout			55.20	▲1.75
LDP gain from Centrist Reform				

2024
Party	Candidate	Votes	%	±%
CDP	Sayuri Otsuka	83,282	46.8	
LDP	Akira Amari	63,217	35.5	
Ishin	Yōichi Kaneko	31,550	17.7	
Registered electors		345,059		
Turnout			53.45	
