= Shizue Yamaguchi =

Japanese politician (1917–2012)

- 山口 シヅエ
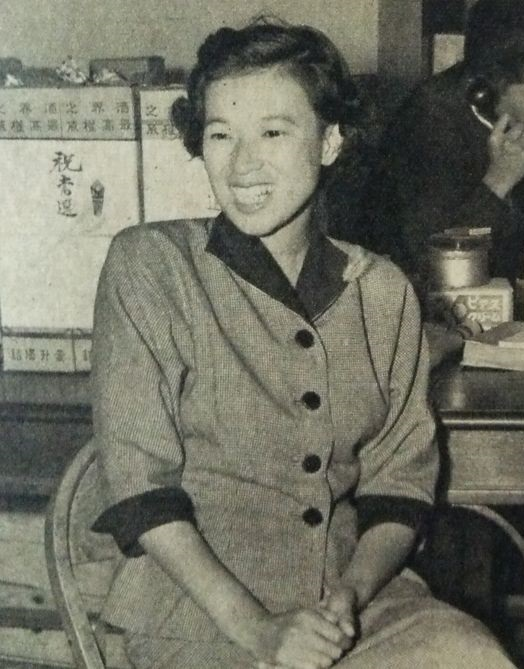
- Yamaguchi in 1952

Member of the House of Representatives
- In office 6 December 1976 – 19 May 1980
- Preceded by: Kimiyoshi Amano
- Succeeded by: Koji Kakizawa
- Constituency: Tokyo 6th
- In office 11 April 1946 – 13 November 1972
- Preceded by: Constituency established
- Succeeded by: Susumu Sano
- Constituency: Tokyo 1st (1946–1947); Tokyo 6th (1947–1972)

Personal details
- Born: 31 October 1917 Chūō, Tokyo, Japan
- Died: 3 April 2012 (aged 94) Tokyo, Japan
- Party: Liberal Democratic
- Other party: JSP (1946–1951; 1955–1967); RSP (1951–1955)
- Parent: Shigehiko Yamaguchi (father)

Shizue Yamaguchi (Japanese: 山口シヅエ; 31 October 1917 – 3 April 2012) was a Japanese physician and politician. She was one of the first group of women elected to the House of Representatives in 1946.

== Biography ==
Yamaguchi was born in the Nihonbashi district of Tokyo in 1917, the eldest daughter of Shigehiko Yamaguchi, the owner of Yamaguchi Bicycle and later a politician. She was educated at Tokyo Prefectural 7th Girls' High School, after which she joined the family business, becoming a typist and head cook.

After World War II, Yamaguchi joined the Japan Socialist Party. Sponsored by Toyohiko Kagawa, she was a JSP candidate in Tokyo 1st district in the 1946 general elections, the first in which women could vote, and was elected to the House of Representatives. She was re-elected in 1947 and 1949. When the JSP split, she joined the Rightist Socialist Party and was re-elected in 1952, 1953 and 1955. After the JSP re-united, she was re-elected in 1958, 1960, 1963 and 1967. Following the 1967 elections she left the JSP and joined the Liberal Democratic Party. She was subsequently re-elected again in 1969, after which she served as Deputy Secretary of State for Economic Planning from 1970 to 1971. Although she lost her seat in the 1972 elections (by which time she was the last remaining member of the first intake of female MPs), she was returned to office in the 1976 elections and re-elected in 1979, serving in the House until 1980. She retired from politics after the 1983 elections.

In 1980 Yamaguchi received the United Nations Peace Medal. In 1987 she was made a member of the Order of the Sacred Treasure. She died of renal failure in 2012.
