= Governor of Tokyo =

Head of government of Tokyo

- 東京都知事
- Flag of Tokyo

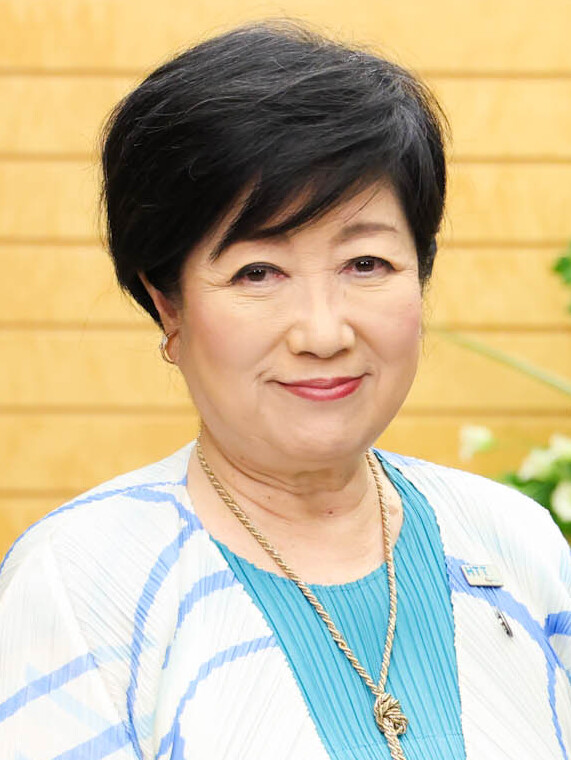
- Incumbent; Yuriko Koike since 1 August 2016
- Tokyo Metropolitan Government
- Style: Governor (informal); The Honourable (formal)
- Residence: Tokyo Governor's Mansion (until 2014)
- Appointer: Direct election
- Term length: Four years, no term limit
- Precursor: Governor of Edo Prefecture; Governor of Tokyo Prefecture; Mayor of Tokyo
- Formation: May 3, 1947; 79 years ago
- First holder: Seiichiro Yasui
- Deputy: Lieutenant Governors of Tokyo

The governor of Tokyo (Japanese: 東京都知事, Hepburn: Tōkyō-To Chiji) is the head of government of Tokyo.

In 1943, upon the unification of Tokyo City and Tokyo Prefecture into Tokyo Metropolitan Government, the position of Governor was created. Previously, the prefecture had a Governor while the City had a Mayor. The current title was adopted in 1947 due to the enactment of the Local Autonomy Law.

== Overview ==
The Governor of Tokyo is the head of the Tokyo Metropolitan Government, and is elected by the citizens of Tokyo Metropolis every four years, most recently in the 2024 Tokyo gubernatorial election.

As Tokyo has the largest economy and population in the country, government policies can greatly affect national affairs, giving a governor significant influence in the country and a louder voice in the National Governors' Association.

The annual budget of Tokyo is about 13 trillion yen, ten times that of other prefectures and comparable to the national budget of Indonesia, so a governor also has a great deal of influence in the national economy. The Tokyo Metropolitan Government has more than 160,000 employees, making it by far Japan's largest employer.

== Qualifications ==
Candidates must be a citizen of Japan and be a resident of Tokyo for more than three months, and must be over the age of 30. Candidates must also put up three million yen to the Tokyo Metropolitan Government, which will only be returned if they receive at least 10% of the votes.

== List ==
=== Appointed, Tokyo Prefecture (1869–1943) ===
- Karasumaru Mitsue (1868)
- Ōki Takatō (1868–1869)
- Mibu Motoosa (1869–1871)
- Yuri Kimimasa (1871–1872)
- Ōkubo Ichiō (1872–1875)
- Kusumoto Masataka (1875–1879)
- Matsuda Michiyuki (1879–1882)
- Yoshikawa Akimasa (1882–1885)
- Hiromoto Watanabe (1885–1886)
- Takasaki Goroku (1886–1890)
- Marquis Hachisuka Mochiaki (1890–1891)
- Tomita Tetsunosuke (1891–1893)
- Miura Yasushi (1893–1896)
- Marquis Koga Michitsune (1896–1897)
- Viscount Okabe Nagamoto (1897–1898)
- Koizuka Ryū (1898)
- Baron Senge Takatomi (1898–1908)
- Hiroshi Abe (governor) (1908–1912, 1st time)
- Hiroshi Abe (1919–1921, 2nd time)
- Usami Katsuo (1921–1925)

=== Appointed, Tokyo Metropolis (1943–1947) ===
- Shigeo Ōdachi (1943–1944)
- Toshizō Nishio (1944–1945)
- Hisatada Hirose (1945–1946)
- Shōhei Fujinuma (1946)
- Haruo Matsui (1946)
- Seiichirō Yasui (1946–1947)
- Kazumi Iinuma (1947)

=== Elected, Tokyo Metropolis (1947–present) ===
No.	Portrait	Name (born – died)	Term of office		Party	Election
1		Seiichiro Yasui (1881–1962)	May 3, 1947	April 18, 1959	Independent (Note: Elected with the support of the LDP.)	1947 1951 1955
2		Ryutaro Azuma (1893–1983)	April 27, 1959	April 22, 1967	Independent	1959 1963
3		Ryokichi Minobe (1904–1984)	April 23, 1967	April 22, 1979	Independent (Note: First elected with the support of the Japan Socialist Party and Japan Communist Party.)	1967 1971 1975
4		Shunichi Suzuki (1910–2010)	April 23, 1979	April 22, 1995	Independent	1979 1983 1987 1991
5		Yukio Aoshima (1932–2006)	April 23, 1995	April 22, 1999	Independent	1995
6		Shintaro Ishihara (1932–2022)	April 23, 1999	October 31, 2012	Independent (Note: Elected with the support of the LDP and New Komeito.)	1999 2003 2007 2011
7		Naoki Inose (b. 1946)	December 18, 2012	December 24, 2013	Independent (Note: Elected with the support of the LDP, New Komeito, and Restoration.)	2012
8		Yōichi Masuzoe (b. 1948)	February 11, 2014	June 21, 2016	Independent	2014
9		Yuriko Koike (b. 1952)	August 2, 2016	Incumbent	Independent (Note: Elected with the support of the Tomin First in 2020.)	2016 2020 2024
