= Shunichi Suzuki (governor) =

Japanese politician and bureaucrat

- 鈴木 俊一
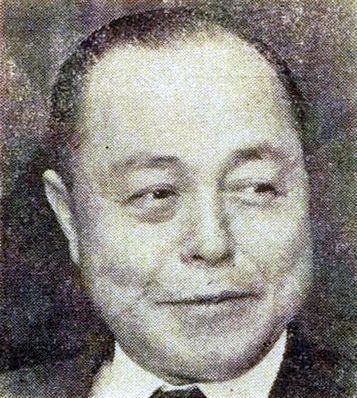
- Suzuki in 1967

Governor of Tokyo
- In office 23 April 1979 – 22 April 1995
- Monarchs: Hirohito; Akihito
- Preceded by: Ryokichi Minobe
- Succeeded by: Yukio Aoshima

Chairman of the National Governors Association of Japan
- In office 18 July 1980 – 22 April 1995
- Preceded by: Okuda Ryōzō
- Succeeded by: Shirō Nagano

Deputy Chief Cabinet Secretary (Administrative affairs)
- In office 14 June 1958 – 9 June 1959
- Prime Minister: Nobusuke Kishi
- Preceded by: Eijō Okazaki
- Succeeded by: Kōshō Ogasa

Personal details
- Born: 6 November 1910 Ōe, Yamagata, Japan
- Died: 14 May 2010 (aged 99) Tokyo, Japan
- Resting place: Aoyama Cemetery
- Party: Independent
- Education: Tokyo Imperial University

Shunichi Suzuki (鈴木 俊一, Suzuki Shun'ichi; 6 November 1910 – 14 May 2010) was a Japanese politician and bureaucrat who served as governor of Tokyo from 1979 to 1995.

== Biography ==
Suzuki graduated from Tokyo Imperial University and worked in the Japanese Home Ministry from 1933 to 1947, and then in the Ministry of Home Affairs, where he worked on the development of the Local Autonomy Law, public election laws and other postwar governance rules. He served as Deputy Chief Cabinet Secretary under Prime Minister Nobusuke Kishi. Governor Ryotaro Azuma appointed Suzuki Vice Governor of Tokyo in 1959, and he served in this capacity until 1967, during which time he was instrumental in the planning of the 1964 Summer Olympics. Azuma declined to run for a third term in 1967, following which Suzuki served in several other roles, including as chairman of the Osaka Expo '70 planning committee.

Suzuki was elected as governor in 1979 with the support of the Liberal Democratic Party. As governor, his most noted accomplishment was the development of the Odaiba area on Tokyo Bay. He also planned the relocation of the Tokyo metropolitan government to its current location in Shinjuku, and the development of the Tokyo International Forum and the Edo-Tokyo Museum. He had planned a major exposition (世界都市博覧会) to be held in Odaiba in 1996, but the plan was cancelled by his successor Yukio Aoshima.

Suzuki died on 14 May 2010. Tokyo Governor Shintaro Ishihara presided over his funeral services at Aoyama Cemetery.

Political offices
Preceded by Eijō Okazaki	Deputy Chief Cabinet Secretary; 1958–1959	Succeeded by Kōshō Ogasa
Preceded by Ryokichi Minobe	Governor of Tokyo; 1979–1995	Succeeded by Yukio Aoshima
Other offices
Preceded by Ryōzō Okuda	President of the National Governors' Association; 1980–1995	Succeeded by Shirō Nagano
Preceded by Keizō Hayasahi	President of the Japan Good Deed Association; 1990–2004	Succeeded by Kōshō Kawamura
