= Ben Kimura (politician) =

Japanese politician (born 1939)

- 木村 勉
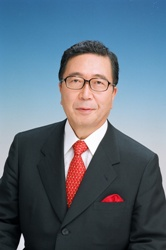
- Official portrait, 2007

Member of the House of Representatives
- In office 9 November 2003 – 21 July 2009
- Preceded by: Koji Kakizawa
- Succeeded by: Shōzō Azuma
- Constituency: Tokyo 15th
- In office 11 April 1999 – 2 June 2000
- Preceded by: Koji Kakizawa
- Succeeded by: Koji Kakizawa
- Constituency: Tokyo 15th

Member of the Tokyo Metropolitan Assembly
- In office 1977–1999
- Constituency: Kōtō Ward

Member of the Koto City Assembly
- In office 1971–1977
- Constituency: Kōtō Ward

Personal details
- Born: 15 August 1939 (age 87) Kōtō, Tokyo, Japan
- Party: Liberal Democratic
- Other political affiliations: New Liberal Club
- Education: Keio University

Ben Kimura (木村 勉, Kimura Ben; born 15 August 1939) is a former Japanese politician of the Liberal Democratic Party, who served as a member of the House of Representatives in the Diet (national legislature). A native of Kōtō, Tokyo and graduate of Keio University, he had served in the ward assembly of Kōtō for two terms since 1971 and the assembly of Tokyo for six terms since 1977. He was elected to the House of Representatives for the first time in 1998 but lost his seat two years later. He was re-elected in 2003.
