= Higuchi Keiko =

Japanese activist, journalist and writer (born 1932)

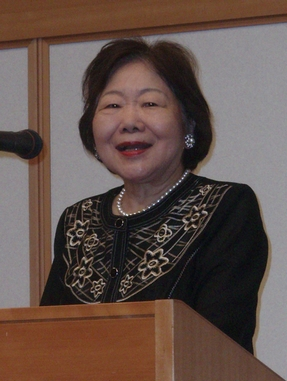
Image of Keiko Higuchi

Higuchi Keiko (樋口 恵子; born May 4, 1932) is a Japanese activist, journalist and writer. She teaches as professor in faculty of letters of Tokyo Kasei University.

As an activist she has been known as feminist, but since the 1980s active on warfare around aged people and their families. She is the Representative Secretary General of a Japan-based NPO, Women's Association for the Better Aging Society (WABAS).

She was graduated at Faculty of Letters in University of Tokyo in 1956. While she was officially at the seminar of Aesthetics and Art History, she studied journalism in the Institute of Newspaper Researches, an institute of the university. She worked for Jiji Press, Gakken and Canon respectively. Since 1971 she has been a freelance writer and critic, mainly concerning feminism, warfare and education.

She contributed the piece "The sun and the shadow" to the 1984 anthology Sisterhood Is Global: The International Women's Movement Anthology, edited by Robin Morgan.

She ran for the governor of Tokyo in 2003 as an independent candidate and lost.

== Publications ==
- Onna no ko no sodatekata : ai to jiritsu e no shuppatsu, 1978
- Onna no ningen kankeigaku, 1982
- Bringing up girls : start aiming at love and independence : status of women in Japan, 1985
- Sazae-san kara Ijiwaru bāsan e : onna kodomo no seikatsushi, 1993
