= Wataru Asō =

Japanese politician (1939–2025)

- 麻生 渡
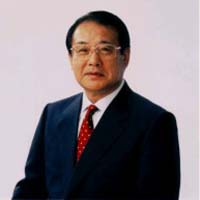

Governor of Fukuoka Prefecture
- In office April 1995 – April 2011
- Monarch: Akihito
- Preceded by: Hachirō Tsuji
- Succeeded by: Hiroshi Ogawa

Personal details
- Born: 15 May 1939 Kitakyushu, Fukuoka, Japan
- Died: 15 March 2025 (aged 85) Higashi-ku, Fukuoka, Japan
- Cause of death: Pancreatic Cancer
- Party: Independent
- Education: Kyoto University
- Occupation: Bureaucrat, politician
- Awards: Order of the Rising Sun

Wataru Asō (麻生 渡, Asō Wataru; 15 May 1939 – 15 March 2025) was a Japanese bureaucrat and politician who served as the Governor of Fukuoka from 1995 to 2011. From 2005 to 2011 he was also President of the National Governors Association (Japan) (全国知事会, Zenkoku Chiji-kai).

== Personal Background ==
Wataru Asō was born in Tobata City, Fukuoka Prefecture (now Tobata ward, Kitakyushu city). After graduating from Fukuoka Prefectural Tobata High School, he went on to study at Graduate School of Law and Faculty of Law, Kyoto University. Upon graduating in 1963, he joined the Ministry of International Trade and Industry (MITI).

== Career in Government ==
During his career as a bureaucrat, Asō held several key positions within MITI, including roles in energy, trade policy, industrial planning, and foreign affairs. Some of his notable appointments include:

- 1963: Entered the Ministry of International Trade and Industry (MITI)
- 1989: Director-General of the Kinki Bureau of International Trade and Industry
- 1990: Deputy Director-General of Trade Policy Bureau, MITI
- 1991: Director-General of Commerce and Distribution Policy
- 1992–1994: Commissioner of the Japan Patent Office

== Political career ==
Asō was Governor of Fukuoka Prefecture from 1995 to 2011.

In the 1995 Fukuoka gubernatorial election, Asō ran as an independent candidate and won. He was re-elected in 1999, 2003, and 2007, serving four consecutive terms until 2011.

During his tenure, he promoted regional development, industrial innovation, and decentralization policies, while also advocating for increased autonomy for local governments.

In 2005, he was elected as the 10th president of the National Governors Association, marking the first time in history that an election was held for the position.

=== Resignation as Governor ===
Despite contemplating a fifth term, he decided against running for re-election due to growing criticism of long-term incumbency and a corruption scandal involving a former deputy governor. He stepped down in April 2011, and his successor, Hiroshi Ogawa, was endorsed as his preferred candidate.

== Post-Governorship ==
Following his retirement from politics, Asō remained active in business and academia:

- 2011: Became a special advisor to JR Kyushu.
- 2012: Appointed as President of Fukuoka Airport Building Co., Ltd.
- 2017: Received the Order of the Rising Sun, Grand Cordon

== Death ==
On 15 March 2025, Wataru Asō died at the age of 85 from pancreatic cancer at Kyushu University Hospital in Fukuoka City.

== Awards and recognition ==
- 2007: Ministry of Education, Culture, Sports, Science and Technology Award (for promoting regional industrial clusters)
- 2009: Japan Business Federation Chairman's Award (for establishing a global research hub on hydrogen materials)
- 2017: Order of the Rising Sun, Grand Cordon

== Personal Interests ==
- Practiced Judo since high school, reaching fourth-degree black belt
- Skilled in Go (traditional Japanese board game), ranked at amateur fifth dan
- Appeared in a Fukuoka rice commercial alongside Olympic judoka Ryoko Tani.

== Sources ==
- 政治家情報 〜麻生 渡〜. ザ･選挙 (in Japanese). JANJAN.
