= Mito Kakizawa =

Japanese politician

- 柿沢 未途
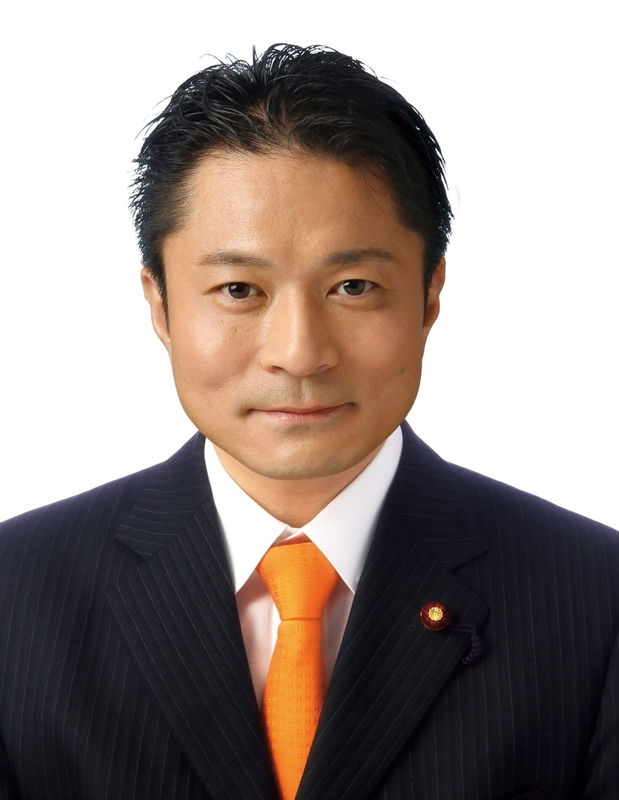
- Official portrait, 2014

Member of the House of Representatives
- In office 30 August 2009 – 1 February 2024
- Preceded by: Multi-member district
- Succeeded by: Natsumi Sakai
- Constituency: Tokyo PR (2009–2012); Tokyo 15th (2012–2017); Tokyo PR (2017–2021); Tokyo 15th (2021–2024)

Member of the Tokyo Metropolitan Assembly
- In office July 2001 – 12 February 2008
- Constituency: Kōtō Ward

Personal details
- Born: 21 January 1971 (age 55) Brussels, Belgium
- Party: Independent
- Other political affiliations: DPJ (2001–2008); Your Party (2009–2013); Unity (2013–2014); JIP (2014–2016); DP (2016–2017); KnT (2017–2018); LDP (2021–2023)
- Spouse: Yukie Kakizawa
- Parent: Koji Kakizawa (father)
- Education: Azabu High School
- Alma mater: University of Tokyo
- Website: 310kakizawa.jp

Mito Kakizawa (柿沢未途, Kakizawa Mito; born 21 January 1971) is a Japanese politician and former member of the House of Representatives. He represented the Tokyo 15th district in the House of Representatives.

His father was Koji Kakizawa, a former foreign minister and member of both houses of the Diet, serving in the House of Representatives for seven terms until 2003.

== Biography ==
Kakizawa was born in Brussels while his father Koji Kakizawa was stationed overseas with the Ministry of Finance. He grew up in Tokyo, attending Azabu High School and the University of Tokyo. He worked for NHK in Nagano from 1995 to 1999, during which time he worked on the broadcasting of the 1998 Winter Olympics. He resigned to work on his father's campaign in the 1999 gubernatorial election in Tokyo. Although the elder Kakizawa lost that race, he was elected to the House of Representatives in the 2000 election and the younger Kakizawa subsequently served as his assistant.

Kakizawa won a seat in the Tokyo Metropolitan Assembly in the 2001 election, campaigning to reduce the number of wards in Tokyo to twelve. He was reelected in the 2005 election as a member of the Democratic Party of Japan. In 2008, he was involved in a drunk driving incident and left the metropolitan assembly.

He joined Your Party in 2009 and stood as a candidate for the 15th district in the 2009 general election. He failed to win that seat, but picked up a seat in the Tokyo proportional representation block. He won the 15th district seat in the 2012 general election. He left Your Party in August 2013, and later joined the new Yuinotoh party formed under Kenji Eda.

On 31 October 2023, Kakizawa resigned from his post as State Minister of Justice after admitting to being involved in illegal campaigning.

On 28 December 2023, he was arrested for violating the Public Offices Election Act and faced charges of vote-buying worth 2.8 million yen (19,000 USD) during mayoral elections in the Kōtō ward of Tokyo in April. On 14 March 2024, a court convicted him of the charges and sentenced him to a two-year suspended sentence.
