= 2003 Tokyo gubernatorial election =

Election for Governor of Tokyo

← 1999	April 13, 2003	2007 →
- Turnout: 44.94% ▼12.93 pp
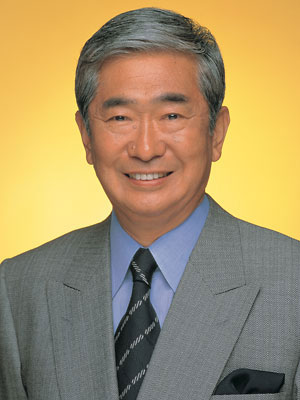

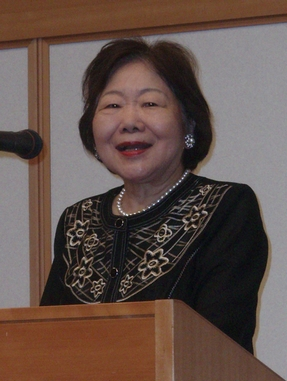
Candidate	Shintarō Ishihara	Keiko Higuchi
Party	Independent	Independent
Popular vote	3,087,190	817,146
Percentage	70.2%	18.6%
Governor before election
Shintarō Ishihara
Independent
Elected Governor
Shintarō Ishihara
Independent

The 2003 Tokyo Gubernatorial elections were held on 13 April 2003. Incumbent governor Shintaro Ishihara was re-elected with the support of the Liberal Democratic Party, which was riding a nationwide wave of popularity under Prime Minister Junichiro Koizumi. Opposition parties had billed the election as a referendum regarding Japanese support for the Iraq War. Although endorsed by the LDP, Ishihara's landslide victory was partly owed to the popularity of policies he enacted in opposition to the national government, such as stricter pollution controls.

== Results ==
Candidate	Party	Votes	%
Shintarō Ishihara (incumbent)	endorsed by LDP	3,087,190	70.2
Keiko Higuchi	endorsed by DPJ, SDP	817,146	18.6
Yoshiharu Wakabayashi	Japanese Communist Party	364,007	8.3
Yoshiro Nakamatsu (ドクター 中松)		109,091	2.5
Kazutomo Ikeda (池田 一朝)		19,860	0.4
Total (Turnout: 44.94% (-12.93%))		4,397,294	
