= Ryokichi Minobe =

Japanese politician (1904–1984)

- 美濃部 亮吉
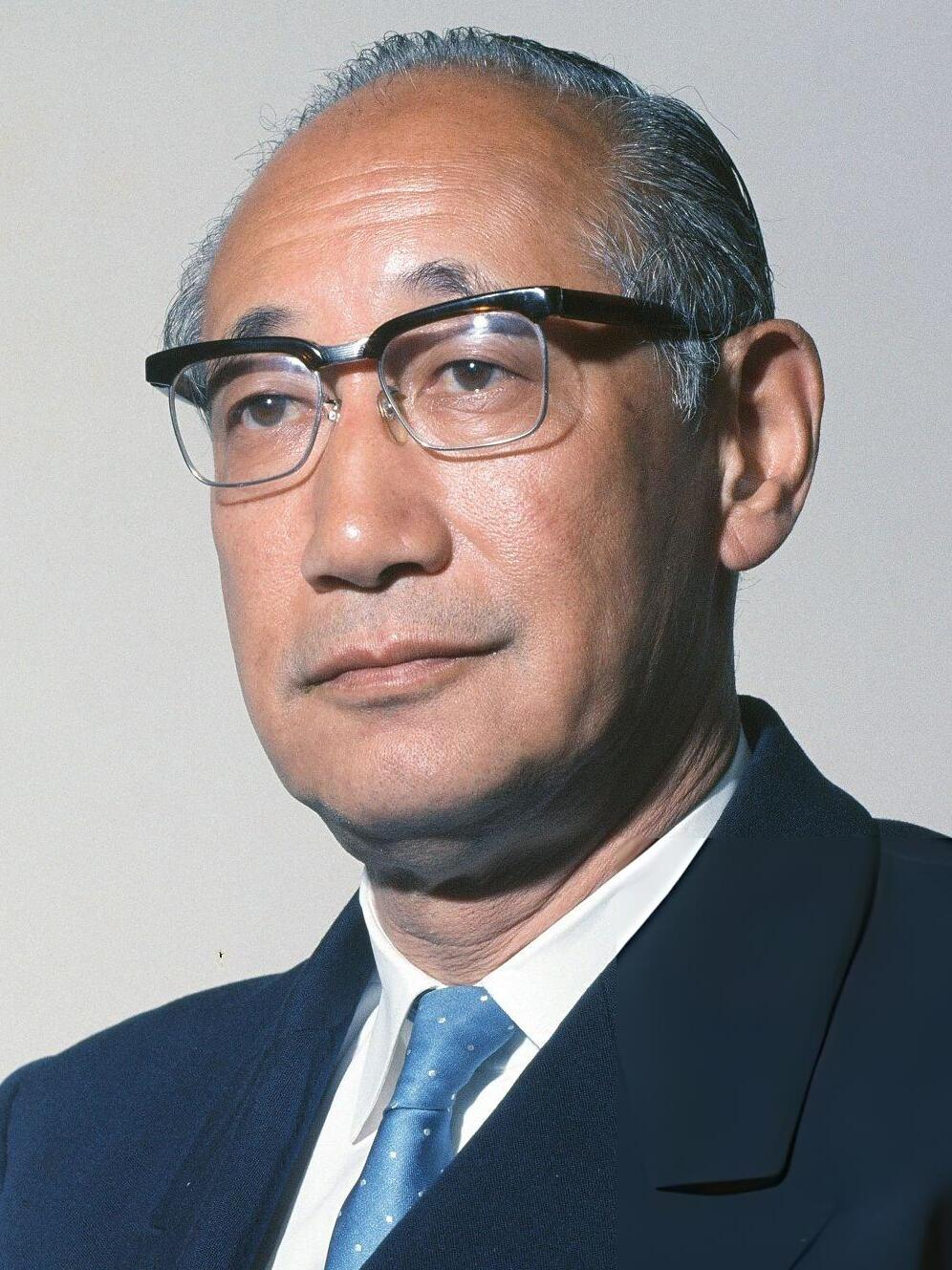
- Minobe in 1967

Governor of Tokyo
- In office 23 April 1967 – 22 April 1979
- Monarch: Hirohito
- Preceded by: Ryotaro Azuma
- Succeeded by: Shunichi Suzuki

Member of the House of Councillors
- In office 8 July 1980 – 24 December 1984
- Preceded by: Multi-member district
- Succeeded by: Constituency abolished (1986)
- Constituency: National district

Personal details
- Born: 5 February 1904 Bunkyō, Tokyo, Japan
- Died: 24 December 1984 (aged 80) Shibuya, Tokyo, Japan
- Party: Independent
- Parent: Tatsukichi Minobe (father)
- Relatives: Kikuchi Dairoku (grandfather)
- Education: Tokyo Imperial University

Ryokichi Minobe (美濃部 亮吉, Minobe Ryōkichi; 5 February 1904 – 24 December 1984) was a Japanese economist, educator, and socialist politician who served as Governor of Tokyo from 1967 to 1979.

== Early life ==
Minobe was born in Tokyo's Hongō Ward. His father, Tatsukichi Minobe, was a noted constitutional scholar at Tokyo Imperial University (UTokyo), while his mother Tamiko was the eldest daughter of mathematician, educator, and politician Dairoku Kikuchi, who served as the president of UTokyo. He was the great-great-grandson of Edo Period samurai Mitsukuri Genpo through Kikuchi. He graduated from the Faculty of Economics at UTokyo and lectured in the agriculture faculty at his alma mater from 1929 to 1932. His supervisor at the university was the Marxian Economist Hyoei Ouchi. Having enraged dean of the faculty Eijiro Kawai, a staunch opponent of Marxian economics, by his uncareful remark, he had to leave his alma mater. He found a position at Hosei University and taught there for more than a decade.

Minobe was arrested in 1938 due to suspicions of Communist Party ties, and spent 18 months in Sugamo Prison. After his release, he worked as a farmer. In 1945, Minobe became an editorial writer for the newspaper Mainichi Shimbun. He was chosen to head the Cabinet Statistics Office in 1946. Minobe entered the national spotlight in 1960 as the host of a program on NHK where he explained economics for general audiences.

== Rise to public office ==
Japan saw a wave of socialist and communist success in local elections starting in the early 1960s, when protests against the security treaties with the United States galvanized the left wing. In 1965, the Tokyo metropolitan government was embroiled in a major bribery scandal and a massive infestation of flies occurred due to garbage dumping at Yumenoshima, leading to a tumultuous metropolitan assembly election that resulted in the socialist wing taking control.

In 1967, incumbent conservative governor Ryotaro Azuma declined to run for re-election, and Minobe ran as the Communist and Socialist candidate for Governor of Tokyo. He defeated his two rivals, Rikkyo University president Masatoshi Matsushita (nominee of the LDP and DSP) and Shibusawa Shipping head Ken'ichi Abe (nominee of Komeito).

High levels of support from young voters and housewives were seen as contributing factors to Minobe’s win, who delivered over 200 campaign speeches that focused on issues facing Tokyo like rising prices the imbalance between slum districts and areas that were better off. He was supported by labor unions, women’s groups, the Japan Communist Party and the Japan Socialist Party. Both parties, which were influenced by Marxism, were ideologically close to Minobe, who was a Marxist economist. Nevertheless, Minobe stated that he wouldn’t be restricted by them “in carrying out my policies” adding “I will carry out reforms at my own pace.”

== Governor of Tokyo ==
During his time as governor, Minobe presided over a wide range of progressive social reforms. Amongst his many policy achievements included:

- Providing free medical care for the elderly.
- Enactment of pollution controls.
- The establishment of metropolitan housing for special-purpose elderly households.
- Converting streets in heavily trafficked areas to pedestrian-only use.
- Allowing the construction of the Korean School in Tokyo and exempting its owner, Chongryon, from local taxation.
- Ending government sponsorship of Korakuen Hall race tracks.
- An expansion in the provision of full school meals.
- The provision of extralegal assistance for welfare recipients.
- The establishment of mentally and physically disabled dependent pensions.
- The establishment of a system of elderly consultation centers.
- Restrictions on price increases for certain foodstuffs and other goods and services.
- The signing of an agreement between the Tokyo Metropolitan Government and the Japan Housekeepers Association, under which (as noted by one study) “municipalities purchase nursing care vouchers from the association at the agreed rate and distribute them to households in need of home help services.”
- The introduction of welfare allowances for bedridden elderly people.
- The establishment of a comprehensive medical and welfare facility for issues related to elderly care; said to be the first such facility in the world.
- The building of new water purification plants.
- A big expansion in the number of new housing units built through metropolitan government policies such as home loans to workers, public housing, and metropolitan housing.
- The introduction of various measures aimed at helping disabled people, such as the provision of school buses, the establishment of living dormitories, wheelchair-accessible metropolitan areas, the training and lending of guide dogs, subsidies for car and home modification costs, the provision of daily living tools and full-time home helpers, the lending of welfare telephones, and an expansion of special needs schools.
- The introduction of various educational initiatives such as the provision of free textbook loans for part-time high school students, the institutionalization of subsidies for school operating expenses to reduce the burden on parents, supplementation of national subsidies for programs such as graduation albums and field trips to help financially disadvantaged families, home-visit education and in-hospital classes for children living at home, a school assistance program, and an expansion of public funding for equipment and teaching materials. A limit was also placed on high school tuition, which was the lowest in Japan under Minobe’s tenure.

In 1971, Minobe won re-election, defeating LDP candidate Akira Hatano by a huge margin. He was re-elected for a third term in 1975, with the backing of the Socialists, Communists, and Komeito; defeating LDP candidate Shintarō Ishihara, whom Minobe described as a fascist and whose right-wing views on various issues did not endear him to much of the LDP. Ishihara would, however, later serve as a cabinet minister and eventually win the Tokyo governorship in the 1999 election.

The LDP-controlled national government under Kakuei Tanaka mimicked some of Minobe's socialist policies in Tokyo, including free health care for the elderly and for children with cancer, in an attempt to ride the public popularity of these programs.

Japan's left wing lost popularity in the 1970s due to the 1973 oil crisis, growing criticism of welfare programs, and difficulty in completing public works projects. Minobe was narrowly re-elected in 1975, but his coalition lost control of the Tokyo metropolitan assembly in 1977.

Tokyo was also adversely affected by a negative national economic situation. Struggling with a large deficit (that had more than doubled between 1973 and 1978) and close to insolvency, Tokyo was bailed out by the national government in 1978. According to one journal, had the bailout not been given it “would have meant the Home Affairs Ministry taking control of Tokyo’s finances and probably forcing large cutbacks in spending.” Minobe blamed Tokyo’s deficit on factors like a lack of autonomy and inflation, while Home Affairs officials pointed to Minobe’s expenditures as being the cause of much of the deficit. In the end, an austerity plan was announced by Minobe, including rises in tuition, a wage decrease for management officials, a ban on chauffeur-driven cars for city officials, and a one-year pay increase pause for city workers, but ruled out cutting welfare spending.

Many of Minobe's policies toward Chongryon, the Zainichi Korean group affiliated with North Korea were later undone by Ishihara in the aftermath of the revelation of North Korean abductions of Japanese.

== Later life ==
Minobe refused to run for a fourth term in 1979. He ran for the House of Councillors in 1980 and won a seat. He remained a member of the Diet until his death of a heart attack in 1984.

Political offices
Preceded by Ryotaro Azuma	Governor of Tokyo; 1967–1979	Succeeded by Shunichi Suzuki
