= Yuri Kimimasa =

Japanese politician

Viscount Yuri Kimimasa
- 由利 公正
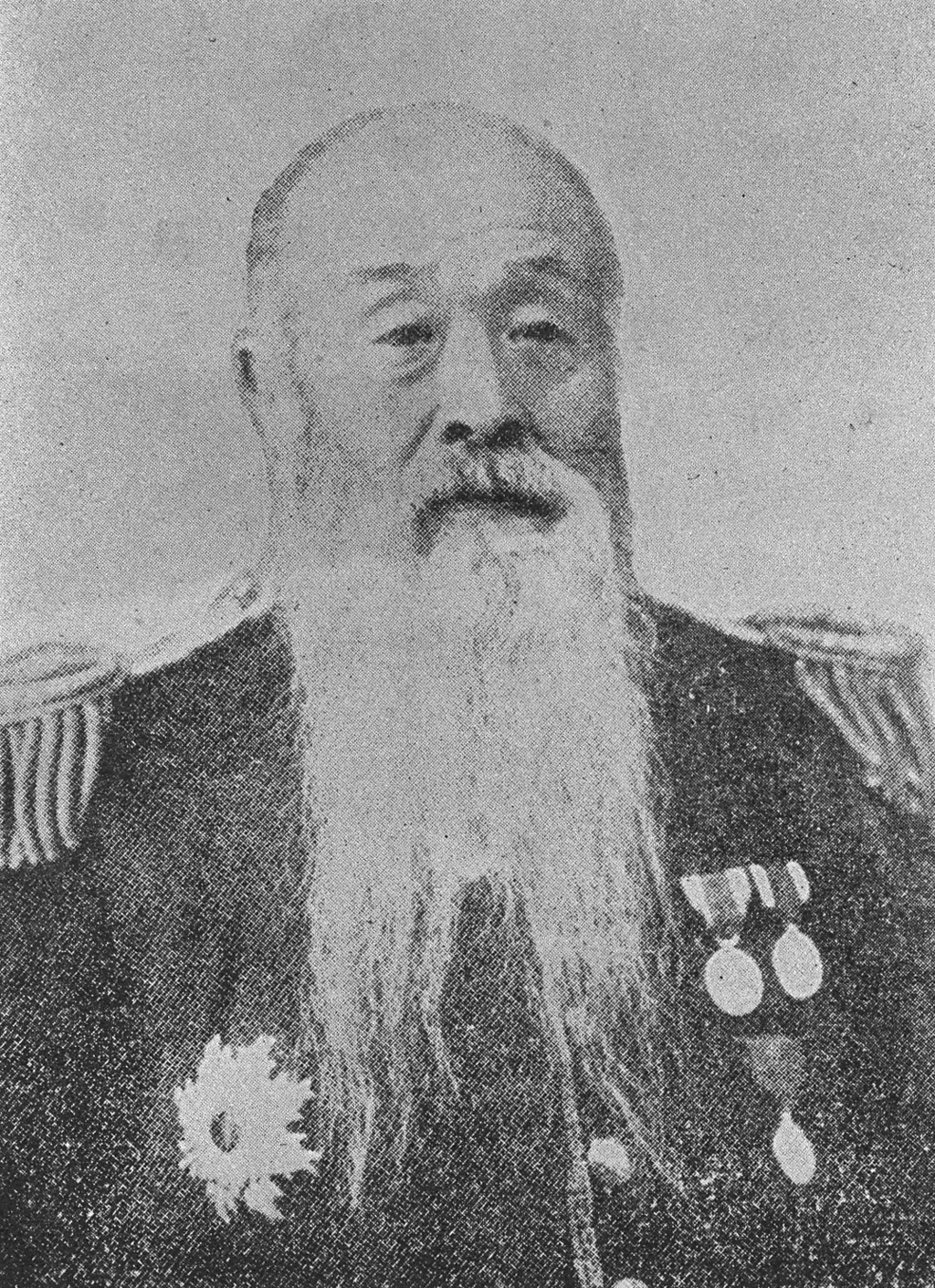

Member of the House of Peers
- In office 10 July 1890 – 30 April 1909 Nominated by the Emperor

Member of the Genrōin
- In office 13 January 1885 – 20 October 1890
- In office 25 April 1875 – 18 December 1876

Governor of Tokyo
- In office 7 September 1871 – 18 August 1872
- Monarch: Meiji
- Preceded by: Mibu Motōsa
- Succeeded by: Ōkubo Ichiō

Governor of Osaka Prefecture
- In office 4 February 1870 – 17 February 1870
- Monarch: Meiji
- Preceded by: Gotō Shōjirō
- Succeeded by: Nishiyotsutsuji Kiminari

Personal details
- Born: 11 November 1829 Asuwa, Echizen, Japan
- Died: 28 April 1912 (aged 82) Takanawa, Tokyo, Japan
- Occupation: Politician, Entrepreneur
- Other names: Yuri Kōsei; Mitsuoka Hachirō

Viscount Yuri Kimimasa (由利 公正; 11 November 1829 – 28 April 1912) was a statesman in Meiji period Japan. During the Meiji Restoration he used the alias Mitsuoka Hachirō (三岡 八郎)

== Life and career ==
Yuri was a samurai born in Fukui, Echizen Province (present-day Fukui Prefecture). He studied under the Confucian scholar Yokoi Shōnan. He worked towards the financial reform and modernizing of the Fukui domain and received preferential treatment from daimyō Matsudaira Yoshinaga due to his great ability.

Yuri joined the new Meiji government as a san'yo (senior councillor), and took charge of the financial and monetary policy of the new government. Notably, he was recommended for this position by noted Bakumatsu-era figure Sakamoto Ryōma, in a letter written around five days before he was assassinated. Together with Fukuoka Takachika, he was the principal author of the Charter Oath. Yuri was involved in the issuance of Japan's first national paper banknotes in 1868.

In 1871, he became the fourth governor of Tokyo. Yuri left the role the following year, but was selected as one of the members of the Iwakura Mission on its around-the-world voyage to the United States and Europe. After his return to Japan, he joined Itagaki Taisuke in petitioning for a representative national assembly.

In 1875, he was appointed to the Genrōin. In 1887 he was elevated to the rank of shishaku (viscount) in the kazoku peerage system. He was nominated to serve in the House of Peers of the Diet of Japan in 1890.

In 1891, Yuri quit government service, moved to Kyoto, and founded the Yurin Seimeihoken K.K., one of Japan's first life insurance companies. The company later merged with Meiji Seimei, the predecessor to Meiji Yasuda Life Insurance Company.
