= Natsumi Sakai (politician) =

Japanese politician (born 1986)

- 酒井 菜摘
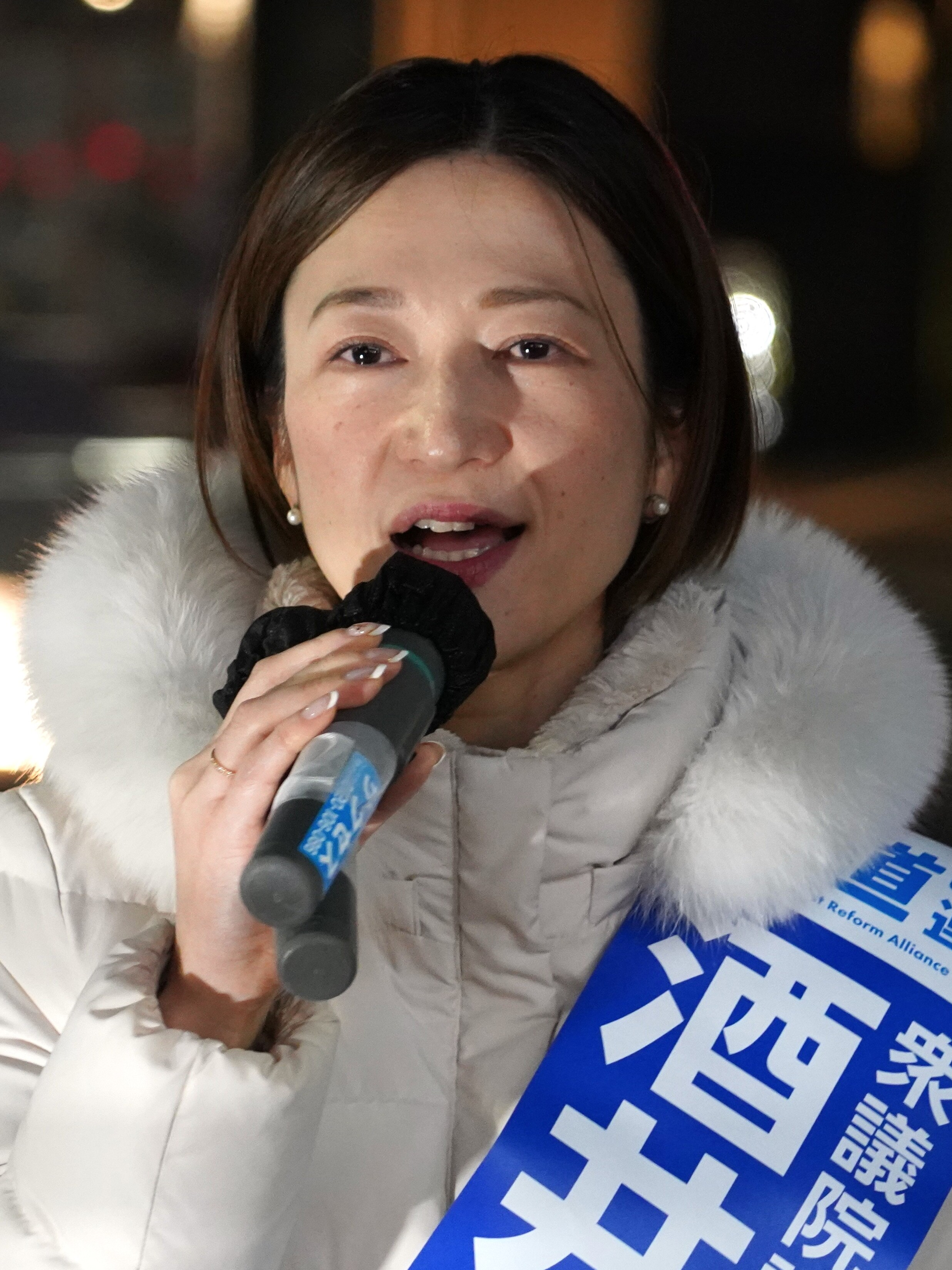
- Sakai in 2026

Member of the House of Representatives
- In office 29 April 2024 – 23 January 2026
- Preceded by: Mito Kakizawa
- Succeeded by: Kōki Ōzora
- Constituency: Tokyo 15th

Member of Koto City Assembly
- In office 1 May 2019 – 3 December 2023

Personal details
- Born: 24 July 1986 (age 40) Kitakyushu, Fukuoka, Japan
- Party: CRA (since 2026)
- Other political affiliations: CDP (2019–2023; 2024–2026); Independent (2023–2024)
- Education: Jiyugaoka High School Nursing Department
- Website: www.sakainatsumi.com

Natsumi Sakai (酒井 菜摘, Sakai Natsumi; born 24 July 1986) is a Japanese politician who served as a member of the House of Representatives for Tokyo 15th district from 2024 to 2026. She previously served in the Kōtō Ward Assembly, and ran for mayor of Kōtō in 2023 with backing from a majority of the opposition.

== Biography ==
Sakai was born in Kitakyushu, Fukuoka Prefecture on 24 July 1986. After graduating from Jiyugaoka High School Nursing Department, she moved to Tokyo and worked as a nurse in the obstetrics and gynecology department at Sasa General Hospital in Nishitokyo, Tokyo. She obtained her midwifery license in 2011. Since 2013, she has worked as a staff member at the opening of the perinatal center at Showa University Koto Toyosu Hospital.

In 2014, at the age of 28, Sakai was diagnosed with cervical cancer. While on leave, she underwent uterine-conserving surgery and chemotherapy, but continued to work. During the 2015 unified local elections, she decided to become a politician after seeing a poster on an election bulletin board that featured a single mother and a female nursery school teacher as candidates. She underwent infertility treatment using in vitro fertilization and intracytoplasmic sperm injection, and after a threatened miscarriage and premature birth, gave birth to her first daughter in 2017. She returned to work in 2018.

She ran as a candidate for the Kōtō Ward Assembly as an endorsed member of the Constitutional Democratic Party of Japan in 2017, and was elected for the first time. She then participated in the formation of the new CDP, before being re-elected in 2023 as the third highest vote getting candidate out of 59.

On 14 November, she left the CDP, and two days later, announced her candidacy for mayor of Kōtō following the resignation of Mayor Yayoi Kimura. She ran as an independent with the backing of the CDP, Japanese Communist Party, Reiwa Shinsengumi, Social Democratic Party, Tokyo Seikatsusha Network, and Greens Japan. She filed her candidacy on 3 December, the public notice date, and resigned from the Assembly as a result. She ended up losing to Tomoka Okubo, who was backed by a unified group of the LDP, Tomin First no Kai, Komeito, and the Democratic Party for the People. In an interview after her loss, she stated she was "disappointed she couldn't break away from old politics."

On 1 February 2024, Mito Kakizawa resigned from the House of Representatives due to his arrest, leaving the 15th district in Tokyo up for a by-election. On 4 April, the CDP announced it would back Sakai for the by-election following his resignation. In response to this, four days later, the Communist Party candidate announced they would withdraw and back Sakai. Votes were counted on 28 April, and she was elected with a clear plurality, being sworn in two days later.
