= 1999 Tokyo gubernatorial election =

Election for Governor of Tokyo

← 1995	April 11, 1999	2003 →
- Turnout: 57.87%
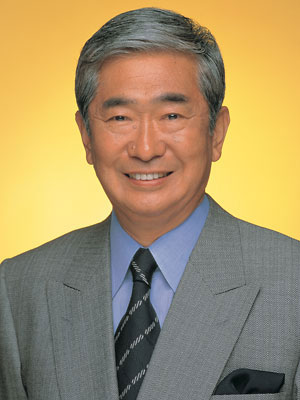

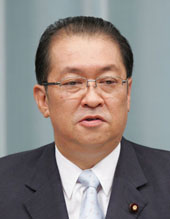

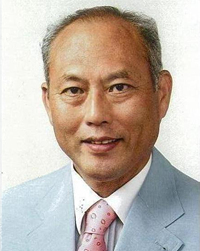
Candidate	Shintarō Ishihara	Kunio Hatoyama	Yōichi Masuzoe
Party	Independent	Independent	Independent
Popular vote	1,664,558	851,130	836,104
Percentage	30.47%	15.58%	15.30%
Governor before election
Yukio Aoshima
Independent
Elected Governor
Shintarō Ishihara
Independent

The 1999 Tokyo gubernatorial election were held on April 11, 1999 as part of the 14th unified local elections. Incumbent Yukio Aoshima announced that he would not seek re-election. All major candidates ran as independents but several were supported by major parties. The Liberal Democratic Party, led by Secretary General Yoshiro Mori, supported Yasushi Akashi as a compromise with coalition partner New Komeito, but local LDP legislators divided their support between candidates Ishihara, Masuzoe and Kakizawa.

Author and former Diet member Shintaro Ishihara, who had previously come in second in the 1975 gubernatorial election against incumbent governor Ryokichi Minobe, won the election on a nationalist platform, saying that he would have the United States return Yokota Air Base to Japan and clarify its position on Japan's ownership of the Senkaku Islands. Akashi came in fourth, the poorest showing by an LDP-supported candidate in Tokyo history.

== Results ==
Gubernatorial election 1999: Tokyo
Party	Candidate	Votes	%	±%
Independent	Shintarō Ishihara	1,664,558	30.47%	
DPJ, TSN, Kaikaku Club	Kunio Hatoyama	851,130	15.58%	
Independent	Yōichi Masuzoe	836,104	15.30%	
LDP, NK	Yasushi Akashi	690,308	12.63%	
JCP	Mitsuru Mikami	661,881	12.11%	
Independent	Kōji Kakizawa	632,054	11.57%	
Independent	Yoshirō Nakamatsu	100,123	1.83%	
Turnout		5,510,042	57.87%	+7.2%

- Note: This list excludes twelve other candidates, none of whom received more than 0.3% of total votes.
