= Yui Kanazawa =

Japanese politician (born 1990)

- 金澤 結衣
- Kanazawa in 2026

Member of the House of Representatives
- Incumbent
- Assumed office 8 February 2026
- Preceded by: Sayuri Otsuka
- Constituency: Kanagawa 20th

Personal details
- Born: 23 October 1990 (age 36) Zama, Kanagawa, Japan
- Party: LDP (since 2025)
- Other political affiliations: Ishin (until 2024); Independent (2024–2025)
- Education: Sophia University

Yui Kanazawa (金澤結衣, Kanazawa Yui; born 23 October 1990) is a Japanese politician serving as a member of the House of Representatives since 2026. She has served as chairwoman of the Liberal Democratic Party in Kanagawa 20th district since 2025.
