= Yukio Aoshima =

Japanese politician

- 青島 幸男

Governor of Tokyo
- In office 23 April 1995 – 22 April 1999
- Monarch: Akihito
- Preceded by: Shunichi Suzuki
- Succeeded by: Shintaro Ishihara

Member of the House of Councillors
- In office 26 July 1992 – 23 March 1995
- Preceded by: Multi-member district
- Succeeded by: Toshiaki Yamada
- Constituency: National PR
- In office 8 July 1968 – 16 June 1989
- Preceded by: Multi-member district
- Succeeded by: Taku Izumi
- Constituency: National district (1968–1986); National PR (1986–1989)

Personal details
- Born: 17 July 1932 Nihonbashi, Tokyo, Japan
- Died: 20 December 2006 (aged 74) Koto, Tokyo, Japan
- Party: Independent
- Other political affiliations: Dainiin Club
- Children: Miyuki Aoshima; Toshiyuki Aoshima
- Education: Waseda University

Yukio Aoshima (青島 幸男, Aoshima Yukio; 17 July 1932 – 20 December 2006) was a Japanese politician who served as Governor of Tokyo from 1995 to 1999. He is also well known as a TV actor, novelist, film director, screenwriter and songwriter.

== Early life and artistic career ==
Yukio was born in Nihonbashi ward of Tokyo City in 1932. His father was an entrepreneur who had been running a bento catering business. He began writing manzai comedy while enrolled as a student at Waseda University and made his debut as a comedy writer in Japan's fledgling television industry.

He rose to fame as the star of programs such as Shabondama Holiday (シャボン玉ホリデー, "Soap Bubble Holiday") and Iji-waru Baasan (いじわるばあさん, "Mean Granny"). He produced, directed and starred in the film Kane (鐘, "The Bell"), which was a contestant in the 1966 Cannes Film Festival. His first novel, Ningen banji saiō ga hinoeuma (人間万事塞翁が丙午), won the Naoki Prize in 1981.

Aoshima wrote for popular comedian Hitoshi Ueki and was largely responsible for creating Ueki's image. According to Ueki, Aoshima once told him: "Don't tell anyone you don't drink, otherwise you'll put me out of a job." Aoshima wrote the hit 1961 song Sudara Bushi (スーダラ節), performed by Hajime Hana and the Crazy Cats, of which Ueki was a member. Aoshima characterized the song as "the saga of a happy-go-lucky salaryman who is unable to avoid the temptations of drink and gambling" with the resonant lyric "I know it's wrong, but I can't give it up." He linked the song to his political views later on, writing that "we have spent several decades creating a society and economy oriented towards mass production, mass distribution, mass consumption, and mass waste. We know something is amiss, but we are so caught up in it that we cannot give it up."

== Political career ==
=== House of Councillors ===
Aoshima was elected to the House of Councillors in the 1968 election as a national block write-in candidate, capitalizing on his fame to win 1.2 million votes and placing second in the block behind Shintaro Ishihara. He refused to give outdoor speeches in the style of other Japanese politicians, and instead went on a trip to Europe during the campaigning season. He nonetheless remained in the Diet until 1995, when he resigned to run for Governor of Tokyo. He was part of the Dainiin Club, a minor political party composed of independent candidates in the House of Councillors.

=== Governor of Tokyo ===
Aoshima ran for Governor of Tokyo in 1995, without major party support and again without campaigning beyond state-sponsored posters and TV spots. Knock Yokoyama, also a comedian, was elected as governor of Osaka Prefecture in the same election cycle.

As governor, Aoshima cancelled a costly "World City" exposition that Governor Shun'ichi Suzuki planned to have held in Odaiba in 1996, calling it a "legacy of the bubble economy era". In the wake of this act, which had formed the bulk of the basis for Aoshima's gubernatorial campaign, his administration was viewed as largely ineffective. He resigned after four years in office, by which time he was known as "Mr. Broken Manifesto".

During his tenure as governor, Aoshima became the target of an assassination attempt in May 1995, when a parcel bomb was mailed to his Tokyo office. The bomb, intended for Aoshima, exploded in the face of his assistant, severely wounding him. It is believed that the bomb was mailed by members of the Japanese doomsday cult Aum Shinrikyo. Aum member Naoko Kikuchi was accused of the bombing but was acquitted after a trial in 2015.

Aoshima ran for the House of Councillors again in the 2001 election and the 2004 election but failed to win a seat. He died of myelodysplastic syndrome in December 2006 at the age of 74.

=== Legacy ===
In the hit tv show bayside shakedown, the main character Shunsaku Aoshima catchphrase is "My last name is Aoshima, just like the Tokyo Governor.", Yukio Aoshima would go on to use a similar catchphrase on tv programs saying "My last name is Aoshima, just like the Wangan Police Station".
