= Seiichirō Yasui =

Japanese politician

- 安井 誠一郎
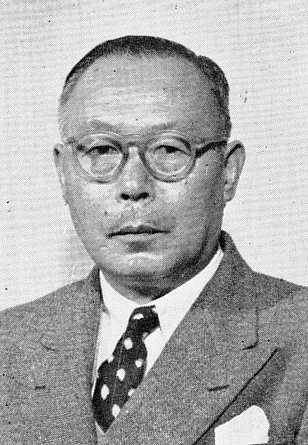
- Yasui in 1960

Member of the House of Representatives
- In office 21 November 1960 – 19 January 1962
- Preceded by: Ichirō Hatoyama
- Succeeded by: Hisakichi Shinomiya
- Constituency: Tokyo 1st

Governor of Tokyo
- In office 14 April 1947 – 18 April 1959
- Monarch: Hirohito
- Preceded by: Ichisho Inuma
- Succeeded by: Ryotaro Azuma
- In office 23 July 1946 – 13 March 1947
- Monarch: Hirohito
- Preceded by: Haruo Matsui
- Succeeded by: Ichisho Inuma

Governor of Niigata Prefecture
- In office 9 April 1940 – 7 January 1941
- Monarch: Hirohito
- Preceded by: Seikichi Kimishima
- Succeeded by: Shohei Doi

Personal details
- Born: 11 March 1891 Mitsu, Okayama, Japan
- Died: 19 January 1962 (aged 70) Tokyo, Japan
- Party: Liberal Democratic
- Other political affiliations: Independent (1940–1960)
- Relatives: Ken Yasui (brother)
- Education: Tokyo Imperial University

Seiichirō Yasui (Japanese: 安井誠一郎; 11 March 1891 – 19 January 1962) was a Japanese politician and bureaucrat who held a variety of positions in Japanese government.

He served as appointed Governor of Niigata Prefecture from 1940 to 1941, then as appointed Governor of Tokyo from 1946 to 1947, then as elected Governor of Tokyo from 1947 to 1959. He also served as one of the members of the House of Representatives from 1960 to his death in 1962.

== Early life and career ==
Yasui was born in Ishima Village, Mitsu District, Okayama Prefecture. After graduating from the Faculty of Law in Tokyo Imperial University, Yasui joined the Home Ministry, where he served as superintendent for Ibaraki and Kanagawa police. He later was promoted to the police chief of Toyama and Hyogo Prefectures.

In 1931, Yasui became a secretary to the Governor-General of Korea, Kazushige Ugaki, and served in colonial management, including the head of the Monopoly Bureau (朝鮮総督府専売局). In addition, in 1936, he was the Governor of Keiki Province. Yasui returned to Japan and was appointed Governor of Niigata Prefecture from 1940 to 1941.

== Governor of Tokyo ==
Yasui was first appointed as the Governor of Tokyo, serving the position from 1946 to 1947. In 1947, he was elected Governor of Tokyo in the first direct elections.

During his 12-year tenure as governor, Yasui helped push for laws for beginning post-World War II reconstruction of Tokyo and turning Tokyo into a modernized metropolis. One was the Metropolitan Area Development Law (首都圏整備法制定), a law enacted in 1956 to plan for the development of the Tokyo metropolitan area. Yasui also decreased food shortages in the capital.

In 1954, Yasui supported a bid for Tokyo to host the 1960 Summer Olympics. Tokyo lost the bid to Rome, but it would later host the 1964 Summer Olympics.

Yasui was re-elected in 1951 and 1955.

== Later life and death ==
In 1960, after retiring from his post as Governor, Yasui ran for election in the House of Representatives for Tokyo 1st District as a member of the Liberal Democratic Party in the 1960 Japanese general election, and was elected with 27.4% of the vote. He served alongside Keiko Asanuma, Eiichi Tanaka, and Hyō Hara.

On 9 January 1962, he was made an honorary citizen of Tokyo due to his contributions to the city. Yasui died 10 days later, on 19 January. He is buried at Tama Cemetery.

== Personal life ==
Yasui's older brother, Ken Yasui (安井謙) was also an accomplished politician, being the former President of the House of Councilors (1977–1980) and Minister of Home Affairs (1960–1962).

Political offices
Preceded by Haruo Matsui	Governor of Tokyo; 1946–1947	Succeeded by Kazumi Iinuma
Preceded by Kazumi Iinuma	Governor of Tokyo; 1947–1959	Succeeded by Ryotaro Azuma
Preceded by Seikichi Kimishima	Governor of Niigata Prefecture; 1940–1941	Succeeded by Shohei Doi
House of Representatives (Japan)
Preceded by Eiichi Tanaka...	Representative for Tokyo's 1st district (multi-member); 1960–1962; Served alongside: Keiko Asanuma, several others	Succeeded by Eiichi Tanaka...
