= Ryotaro Azuma =

Japanese physician and bureaucrat

Ryōtarō Azuma
- 東 龍太郎
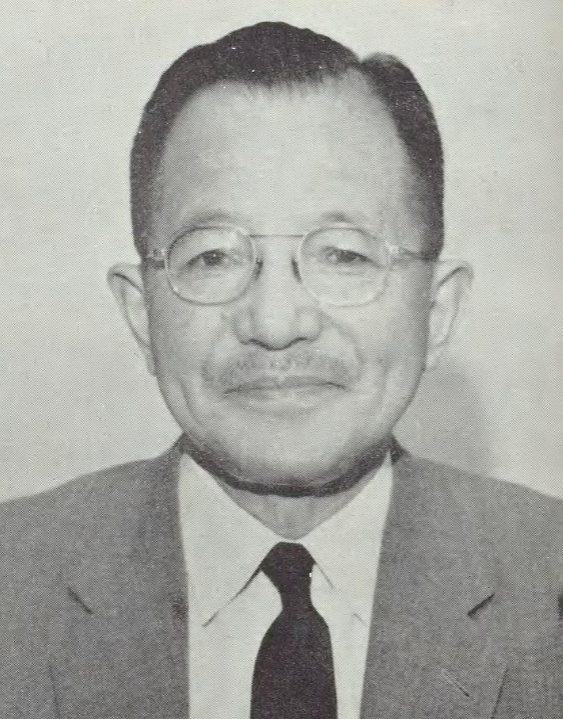
- Azuma in 1963

Governor of Tokyo
- In office 23 April 1959 – 22 April 1967
- Monarch: Hirohito
- Preceded by: Seiichirō Yasui
- Succeeded by: Ryokichi Minobe

President of Ibaraki University
- In office 1 October 1953 – 18 September 1958
- Preceded by: Kyōhei Suzuki
- Succeeded by: Tadashi Futakata (acting)

Personal details
- Born: 16 January 1893 Osaka, Japan
- Died: 26 May 1983 (aged 90)
- Resting place: Tama Cemetery
- Party: Independent
- Spouse: Teruko Azuma (m. 1919)
- Education: Tokyo Imperial University

Ryōtarō Azuma (東 龍太郎, Azuma Ryōtarō; January 16, 1893 – May 26, 1983) was a Japanese physician and bureaucrat who served as Governor of Tokyo from 1959 to 1967. In 1950, Azuma became a member of the international Olympic Committee (IOC).

== Education ==
Born in Osaka, he attended Tokyo Imperial University and studied at the University of London, specializing in physical chemistry and physiology.

== Career ==
He served in the Imperial Japanese Navy during World War II, took a position in the Health Ministry after the war, and later became head of Ibaraki University. In the 1950s he served as head of the Japanese Olympic Committee and played a role in bringing the 1964 Summer Olympics to Tokyo.

In 1959, he was nominated as the Liberal Democratic Party candidate for the Tokyo gubernatorial election. He defeated Socialist candidate Hachirō Arita and took office on April 27. Much of his legacy as governor surrounds the improvements to Tokyo before and during the 1964 Olympics, and accompanying pollution and administrative issues.

== Personal life ==
In 1919, he married Teruko, a daughter of Yamakawa Kenjirō.

He is interred in the Tama Reien Cemetery in Fuchū, Tokyo, Japan.

Political offices
Preceded by Seiichirō Yasui	Governor of Tokyo; 1959–1967	Succeeded by Ryokichi Minobe
Sporting positions
Preceded by Ryōzō Hiranuma	President of the Japan Amateur Athletic Association; 1947–1958	Succeeded by Juichi Tsushima
Preceded by Ryōzō Hiranuma	President of the Japanese Olympic Committee; 1947–1958	Succeeded by Juichi Tsushima
Preceded by Hitoshi Kihara	President of the Ski Association of Japan; 1968–1975	Succeeded by Motohiko Ban
Academic offices
Preceded by Kyōhei Suzuki	President of Ibaraki University; 1953–1958	Succeeded by Tadashi Futakata; Acting
Other offices
Preceded by Tadashi Adachi	President of the Japan Good Deed Association; 1961–1965	Succeeded by Keizō Hayashi
Preceded by Seiichirō Yasui	President of the Japan Good Deed Association; 1972–1983	Succeeded by Tadashi Adachi
Preceded by Jitsuzō Kawanishi	President of the Japanese Red Cross Society; 1968–1978	Succeeded by Keizō Hayashi
