= 2023–24 NHK Party dispute =

Internal struggles within a Japanese political party

- Date: April 7, 2023 – present (3 years, 5 months, 3 weeks and 1 day)
- Cause: Takashi Tachibana's unsuccessful attempt to unseat Ayaka Otsu as party leader
- Participants: NHK Party (Note: The Otsu faction asserts "The Collaborative Party" as the official party name while the Tachibana faction maintains "The Party to Protect the People from NHK" as their party name. The Japanese government recognizes the Otsu faction's name as the party's sole official name.) Otsu faction: Ayaka Otsu; Ryota Akedo; Natsuki Matsumoto; Naoki Miyagawa; Tachibana faction: Takashi Tachibana; Hodaka Maruyama; Satoshi Hamada; Kenichiro Saito
- Outcome: Otsu wing recognized as the sole legal party leadership by the Japanese government as of July 2024; NHK Party loses official national party status in January 2024; NHK Party files bankruptcy in March 2024; Councillors loyal to Tachibana forms the NHK Party parliamentary group

A dispute within the NHK Party, a political party in Japan, began on April 7, 2023 when former party leader Takashi Tachibana, who earlier resigned in favor of the current leader Ayaka Otsu the previous month announced in a press conference that he was re-assuming the leadership without prior knowledge of Otsu. This led to her denying the change of leadership, leading to the creation of two opposing factions within the party. The dispute has led to the disintegration of the party. Having lost all of their local assembly and National Diet seats, the party lost their status as an official national party recognized by the Government of Japan in January 2024, and the party soon after filed for bankruptcy in March 2024.

As of July 2024, the Ministry of Internal Affairs and Communications recognizes the Otsu faction as the legitimate members of the party.

== Background ==
YouTuber Yoshikazu Higashitani, known by his YouTube alias GaaSyy, was elected in the 2022 House of Councillors election as a candidate for the party but was later expelled 8 months later in March 2023 for not attending any sessions, reputedly due to his fear of being arrested on grounds of alleged fraud and defamation against celebrities if he were to return to Japan, as he was residing in the United Arab Emirates for the entirety of his term. Due to this, Tachibana would resign as the party's leader on a press conference, where he announced former child actress Ayaka Otsu as his successor, and the rebranding of the party to Seijika Joshi 48 tō (政治家女子48党, Politician Girls 48 Party).

== Events ==
On April 7, 2023, Tachibana held a press conference and announced that Otsu had been expelled from the party on the previous day, stating that Otsu "posed a risk of dissolving the party." Tachibana then announced that he would return to the position of party leader. In response, Otsu held her own press conference, denying her resignation which split the party between the Otsu wing and the Tachibana wing. On the same day, the Tachibana wing submitted a notification to the Ministry of Internal Affairs and Communications (MIC) through the Chiba Prefectural Election Commission to make the leadership change official, but declined to do so, recognizing Otsu as the sole leader of the party.

The Tachibana wing attempted to revert the party to its old identity, sending a request to the Central Election Management Board that the party would change its name to "The Party to Protect the People from NHK" (NHKから国民を守る党). However, this was rejected.

On August 10, 2023, the two members of the party in the House of Councillors (Satoshi Hamada and Kenichiro Saito) submitted a notification to the House of Councilors Secretariat, changing the name of their parliamentary group to "The Party to Protect the People from NHK" (NHKから国民を守る党), signifying their support for Tachibana.

On November 6, 2023, Otsu held a press conference and announced the change of the party's name to "The Collaborative Party" (みんなでつくる党). The Tachibana wing denied the name changing, stating that "Otsu has no right to represent the party.'' However, the MIC once again ruled in favor of the Otsu wing, accepting the name change on November 14.

Hamada and Saito decided to leave the party in an announcement posted on January 7, 2024 citing their opposition of the current leadership under Otsu. The Otsu wing formally expelled both of them from the party on January 19, resulting in the loss of the party's official status as a national party recognized by the Japanese government as the party no longer held any seats in the National Diet, losing approximately 3.3 billion yen (US$21.7 million) worth of annual government subsidies.

The Tachibana wing declared bankruptcy and proceedings soon commenced on March 14, 2024, as it was revealed that the party was 1.1 billion yen (US$7.2 million) in debt to approximately 300 creditors. However, the Otsu wing said that they will appeal the decision, citing that Tachibana filed bankruptcy to "escape from the various fraudulent acts done by Tachibana and his allies."

== Faction leaders ==
| Position | Otsu wing | Tachibana wing |
|---|---|---|
| Leader | Ayaka Otsu | Takashi Tachibana |
| Deputy Leader | none | Hodaka Maruyama |
| Secretary-General | Ryota Akedo; Natsuki Matsumoto | Satoshi Hamada |
| Auditor | Naoki Miyagawa | none |
