= The Party to Protect the People from NHK (parliamentary group) =

Parliamentary group in Japan

The Party to Protect the People from NHK NHKから国民を守る党 NHK kara kokumin o mamoru tō
- Legislature(s): House of Councillors
- Foundation: 10 August 2023
- Dissolution: 17 November 2025
- Ideology: Direct democracy Anti-communism; Single issue politics: Anti–TV license fees
- Political position: Right-wing
- Website: www.syoha.jp

The Party to Protect the People from NHK (Japanese: NHKから国民を守る党, Hepburn: NHK kara kokumin o mamoru tō) was a parliamentary group of the National Diet of Japan from 2023 to 2025. At its peak, it consisted of two independent members of the House of Councillors.

== History ==
The group was formed on August 10, 2023, by councillors Satoshi Hamada and Kenichiro Saito, who formerly belonged to the political party with the same name. Due to an ongoing leadership dispute between former and de facto leader Takashi Tachibana and the incumbent de jure leader Ayaka Otsu, the Otsu wing of the party expelled the both of them from the party for aligning themselves with Tachibana. As a result, they formed a parliamentary group to continue their activities as "members" of the party.

Hamada lost his seat in the 2025 Japanese House of Councillors election, leaving Saito as the group's only councillor. Saito left the group in November 2025.

== Former parliamentarians from the group ==
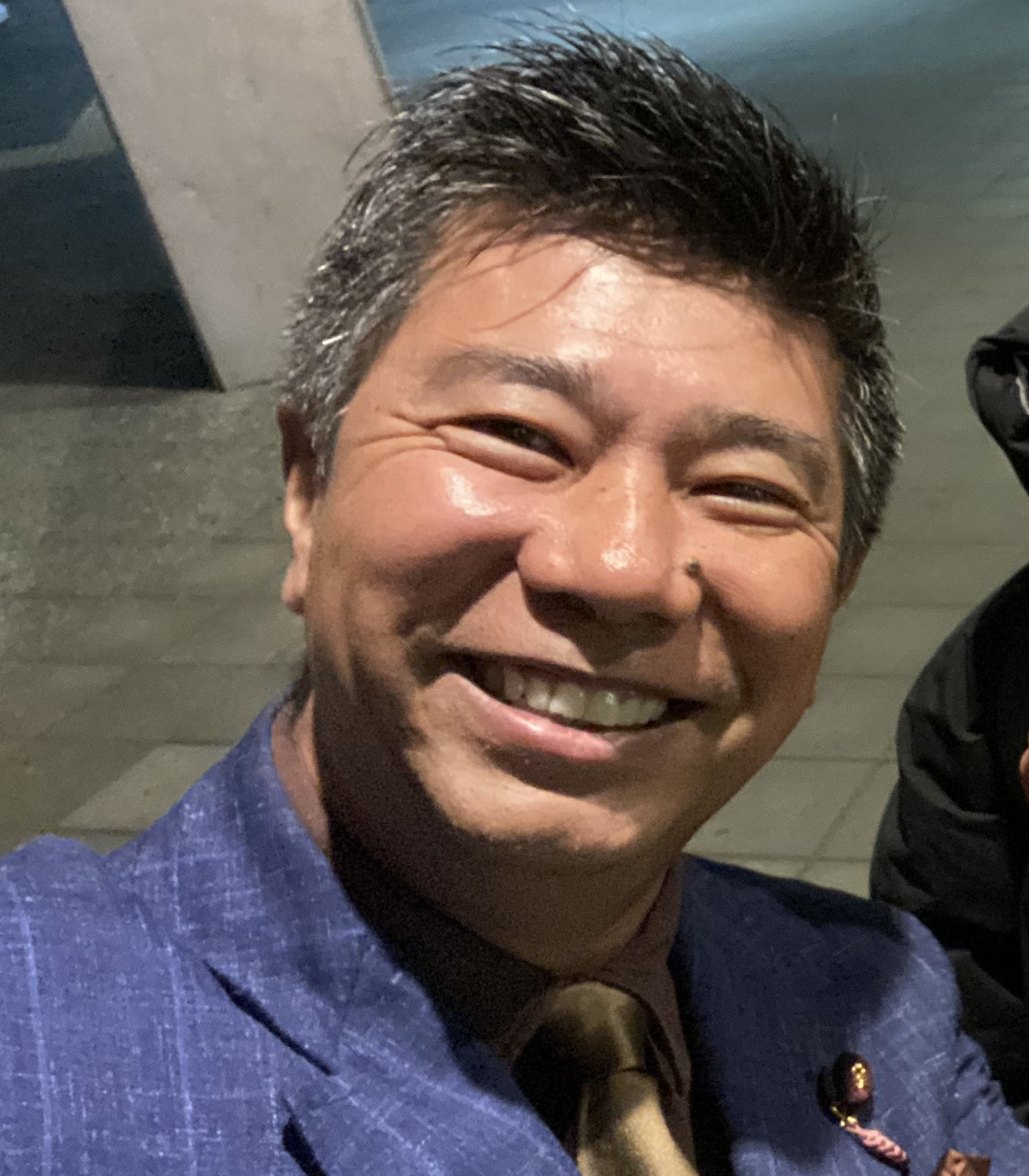
Kenichiro Saito

Member of the House of Councillors	Constituency
Satoshi Hamada	Proportional
Kenichiro Saito	Proportional
