= 2025 Ministry of Finance protests =

Protests against the Japanese Ministry of Finance

2025 Ministry of Finance protests (Japanese: 財務省解体デモ, Hepburn: Zaimusho-kaitai-demo) are a series of protests in Japan made against the Ministry of Finance since February 21, 2025. The protests are mainly taking place in front of the ministry's building, although smaller protests occurred in regional cities.

The protests, according to supporters and various sources are demanding the taxes in the country to be decreased or abolished, such as the consumption tax, while some supporters called for the dissolution of the entire ministry. Misinformation spread in the protests via social media platforms like Twitter, claiming that Donald Trump is planning to force the dissolution of the ministry.

While there were initially no significant disruptions or incidents during the protests, Takashi Tachibana was attacked with a knife before making a speech at the protest on March 14, leaving him with cuts in the ear.

== Background ==
Negative emotions against the Ministry of Finance were seeing an increase since the end of 2024. When Democratic Party For the People demanded the ruling Liberal Democratic Party and Komeito to raise the amount of income where income tax starts to apply from the current 1,030,000 yen in an effort to increase the amount of money people have on their hand, the LDP hesitated to make this change citing the large amount of decrease in incomes from taxes. Yuichiro Tamaki, the leader of DPFP made a post on Twitter that the Ministry of Finance is trying to convince the mass media by releasing the projections for the decrease in income the government would face by the change. After this post, online attacks and negative comments against Ministry of Finance drastically increased by people who assumed that the "old media" and Ministry of Finance was resisting this proposal. Yuichiro, in response to this increase commented that people should focus on constructive discussions instead of spreading conspiracy theories and making attacks. Although the three political parties ended up reaching an agreement to accept DPFP's proposal, LDP and Komeito later ignored this agreement, resulting in public rage, especially among DPFP supporters.

== Protests ==
The protests were first reported on February 21, with a number of around a thousand protesters in front of the Ministry of Finance building. The first protests had no major incidents or disruptions although police were sent to the area. The protests spread through social media platforms, resulting in protests being held in regional cities such as Sapporo. Protesters mainly demand the reduction in tax such as Consumption tax, while some people demand the dissolution of the ministry itself. Protests continued for several days, with a larger protest being held across 12 cities in Japan on March 14.

On March 14, a man was arrested for Attempted murder against Takashi Tachibana after he attacked him with a knife when Takashi was taking photos with his supporters during the protest. Takashi had cuts in his ear, and was taken to hospital.

Misinformation and conspiracy theories such as one labeling the ministry as a puppet of the deep state, spread through online platforms such as Twitter as the protests gained coverage.

== Reactions ==
The protests received mixed reactions. Yuichiro Tamaki, the leader of DPFP stated "Although we should avoid simply attacking ministries and workers, but politicians need to react to the background where this anger is coming from." He also pointed out that the population's dissatisfaction against the ministry raising taxes despite the rising living costs and long-term economic stagnation is causing the protests.

Shigeru Ishiba, the prime minister of Japan stated "The protests show public anger and dissatisfaction, and we must make efforts for the citizens to understand our intentions." He then supported the ministry, saying "The Ministry of Finance is goin through rough times, with this protest taking place. The ministry is doing all it can to improve the country."

Fusao Izumi, former mayor of Akashi stated "Nothing will change if no one speaks up. Discussions start because someone speaks up." Hiroyuki Nishimura, founder of 2channel reacted negatively, calling it "a waste of time and energy".
