= Attempted assassination of Takashi Tachibana =

2025 crime in Japan

- Location: In front of the Ministry of Economy, Trade and Industry, Kasumigaseki, Chiyoda, Tokyo, Japan
- Date: March 14, 2025; Approximately 5:10 p.m. (JST)
- Target: Takashi Tachibana
- Attack type: Assassination attempt
- Weapons: Billhook-type blade (machete, 16 cm or 6.3 in blade)
- Injuries: Takashi Tachibana (non-life-threatening injuries, primarily to the ear/head area)
- Perpetrator: Shion Miyanishi (arrested at the scene)
- Motive: Anger over Tachibana's political activities and role in online controversies surrounding Hyogo Prefecture scandals, particularly the suicide of a prefectural assembly member

On March 15, 2025, Takashi Tachibana, a controversial Japanese politician who is the president of the NHK party, was attacked with a machete by Shion Miyanishi.

== Background ==
Takashi Tachibana is a Japanese politician who founded the NHK party, a populist and right-wing political party.

== Attack ==
On March 15, 2025, Tachibana was giving a stump speech at the Ministry of Economy, Trade and Industry in Tokyo for his campaign in the 2025 Chiba gubernatorial election. At the time of the attack, at approximately 5:10 P.M, he was taking photos with his supporters, and the attacker was standing in line. When his turn came, he suddenly attacked Tachibana with a 16-centimetre (6.3 in) machete. The attacker was subdued by a man in his 30s who was nearby and a man in his 50s who appeared to be a member of Tachibana's staff. The younger man suffered a cut on his left knee.

== Perpetrator ==
Shion Miyanishi
- 宮西詩音
- Born: 1994 (age 31–32); Japan
- Occupation: Unemployed
- Known for: 2025 attempted assassination of Takashi Tachibana
- Criminal charge(s): Attempted murder, violation of the Swords and Firearms Control Act
- Criminal penalty: 9 years imprisonment
- Criminal status: Incarcerated

The perpetrator of the attack was Shion Miyanishi. Miyanishi said he had attacked Takashi Tachibana because of Shingo Watanabe, which he later said to investigators, and he said "I swung the machete down because I wanted to kill him," and "I did it because he is the kind of person who drives an assembly member to commit suicide." and he was indicted in early April 2025 on charges of attempted murder and weapons violations.

== Aftermath ==
Tachibana was injured in his head, neck, and left ear, but his life was not in danger. He later said on X: "I'm fine. Conscious." He later posted, "One month to recover completely," "The criminal is a man I don't know at all," and "I am full of anxiety and fear."

== Sentencing ==
On October 9th 2026, Myanishi was sentenced to 9 years in prison in Tokyo District Court. District Court Judge Kazunobu Eguchi said that Miyanishi's crime was "Highly dangerous and heinous" during sentencing.

== Reactions ==
The Tokyo police department acknowledged shortcomings in its response to the attack.

Chief cabinet secretary Yoshimasa Hayashi said that "no matter the reason, despicable violence is absolutely unacceptable".

Satoshi Hamada sought the government view on the Tokyo police response to the attack and official reply signed under Prime Minister Ishiba and noted that the Tokyo police is being investigator for their response
