= Osaka 19th district =

Japanese single-member electoral district

Numbered map of Osaka Prefecture single-member districts

Ōsaka 19th district (大阪府第19区, Ōsaka-fu dai-jūkyū-ku or simply 大阪19区, Ōsaka-jūkyū-ku) is a single-member electoral district for the House of Representatives, the lower house of the national Diet of Japan. It is located in southern Osaka and consists of the cities of Kaizuka, Izumisano, Sennan, Hannan and the towns of Kumatori, Tajiri and Misaki in Sennan District. As of September 2012, 307,237 eligible voters were registered in the district.

Before the electoral reform of the 1990s, the area had formed part of the five-member Osaka 5th district.

Between 2012 and 2021 the Representative from the district was Hodaka Maruyama. Initially a member of the Japan Restoration Party but later its successor party Ishin. In 2019, Maruyama was ejected from Ishin for comments he made under the influence of alcohol during a visit to the Kuril Islands and he joined the single-issue Anti-NHK party. Nobuhisa Itō, former Representative of the Osaka 11th district gained the seat back for Ishin in 2021.

In the 2026 general election, it was the only district in Osaka prefecture not won by the Ishin candidate.

== List of representatives ==
Representative	Party	Dates	Notes
Kenshirō Matsunami	NFP	1996–2000	Joined the Liberal Party after the dissolution of the NFP, then the breakaway Conservative Party in 2000
Kenshirō Matsunami	CP	2000–2003	Joined the New Conservative Party in 2002, merged into the Liberal Democratic Party in 2003
Takashi Nagayasu	DPJ	2003–2012	
Hodaka Maruyama	JRP	2012–2014	
Hodaka Maruyama	JIP	2014–2017	
Hodaka Maruyama	Ishin	2017–2019	
Hodaka Maruyama	NHK	2019–2021	
Nobuhisa Itō	Ishin	2021–2026	
Tomu Tanigawa	LDP	2026–	

== Election results ==
2026
Party	Candidate	Votes	%	±%
LDP	Tomu Tanigawa	58,410	36.9	▼4.9
Ishin	Nobuhisa Ito (Incumbent) (elected in Kinki PR block)	57,697	36.5	▼8.7
Centrist Reform	Masayo Kobane	20,031	12.7	
Sanseitō	Yoshinori Matsuoka	13,399	8.5	
JCP	Miki Kitamura	8,703	5.5	▼7.5
Registered electors		295,056		
Turnout			54.69	▲4.31
LDP gain from Ishin				

2024
Party	Candidate	Votes	%	±%
Ishin	Nobuhisa Ito (incumbent)	65,726	45.15	▲2.97
LDP	Tomu Tanigawa	60,879	41.82	▲9.63
JCP	Miki Kitamura	18,966	13.03	▲7.31
Majority		4,847	3.33	
Registered electors		298,664		
Turnout			50.38	▼3.58
Ishin hold				

2021
Party	Candidate	Votes	%	±%
Ishin	Nobuhisa Itō	68,209	42,2	▼4.5
LDP	Tomu Tanigawa (won PR seat)	52,052	32.2	▼8.3
CDP	Takashi Nagayasu	32,193	19.9	
JCP	Miki Kitamura	9,258	5.7	▼7.2
Turnout			53.96	▲6.88
Ishin hold				

2017
Party	Candidate	Votes	%	±%
Ishin	Hodaka Maruyama	66,712	46.7	▲9.8
LDP	Tomu Tanigawa (won PR seat)	57,833	40.5	▲7.8
JCP	Miki Kitamura	18,373	12.9	▲5.2
Turnout			47.08	▼3.98
Ishin hold				

2014
Party	Candidate	Votes	%	±%
Ishin	Hodaka Maruyama	56,119	36.9	▼1.5
LDP	Tomu Tanigawa (won PR seat)	51,223	33.7	▲4.1
Democratic	Takashi Nagayasu	33,010	21.7	▼3.4
JCP	Miki Kitamura	11,740	7.7	▲2.0
Turnout			51.06	
Ishin hold				

2012
Party	Candidate	Votes	%	±%
JRP (YP)	Hodaka Maruyama	65,158	38.4	
LDP (Kōmeitō)	Tomu Tanigawa	50,242	29.6	
DPJ (PNP)	Takashi Nagayasu	42,554	25.1	
JCP	Sōtarō Tanoue	9,606	5.7	
HRP	Takahisa Toyoda	1,957	1.2	

2009
Party	Candidate	Votes	%	±%
DPJ (SDP, PNP)	Takashi Nagayasu	110,313.770	55.6	
LDP (Kōmeitō)	Kenshirō Matsunami	70,879	35.7	
JCP	Yutaka Wake	14,735.230	7.4	
HRP	Takahisa Toyoda	2,487	1.3	
Turnout		203058	66.17	

Note: The decimal votes (anbunhyō, "proportional fractional votes") stem from the fact that in this case the given names Takashi and Yutaka are the reading of the same Chinese character 豊, and some voters apparently voted for 豊 without specifying a family name.

2005
Party	Candidate	Votes	%	±%
DPJ	Takashi Nagayasu	91,918.723	48.3	
LDP	Kenshirō Matsunami (elected by PR)	82,437	43.3	
JCP	Yutaka Wake	15,855.275	8.3	
Turnout		197,666	64.95	

2003
Party	Candidate	Votes	%	±%
DPJ	Takashi Nagayasu	75,369	47.2	
NCP	Kenshirō Matsunami	42,284	26.5	
Independent	Yoshihiro Yasuda	27,043	16.9	
JCP	Yutaka Wake	14,962	9.4	
Turnout		166,551	55.14	

2000
Party	Candidate	Votes	%	±%
CP	Kenshirō Matsunami	81,641	53.1	
DPJ	Toshitaka Ishida	46,911	30.5	
JCP	Takashi Nishiyama	23,322	15.2	
Independent	Yasuo Yamaguchi	1,845	1.2	

1996
Party	Candidate	Votes	%	±%
NFP	Kenshirō Matsunami	73,018	48.4	
LDP	Hisakazu Ikejiri	53,906	35.7	
JCP	Chizuru Harada	20,297	13.5	
LL	Shōta Yamamoto	3,676	2.4	
Turnout		155,257	55.31	
