= Takafumi Horie =

Japanese entrepreneur (born 1972)

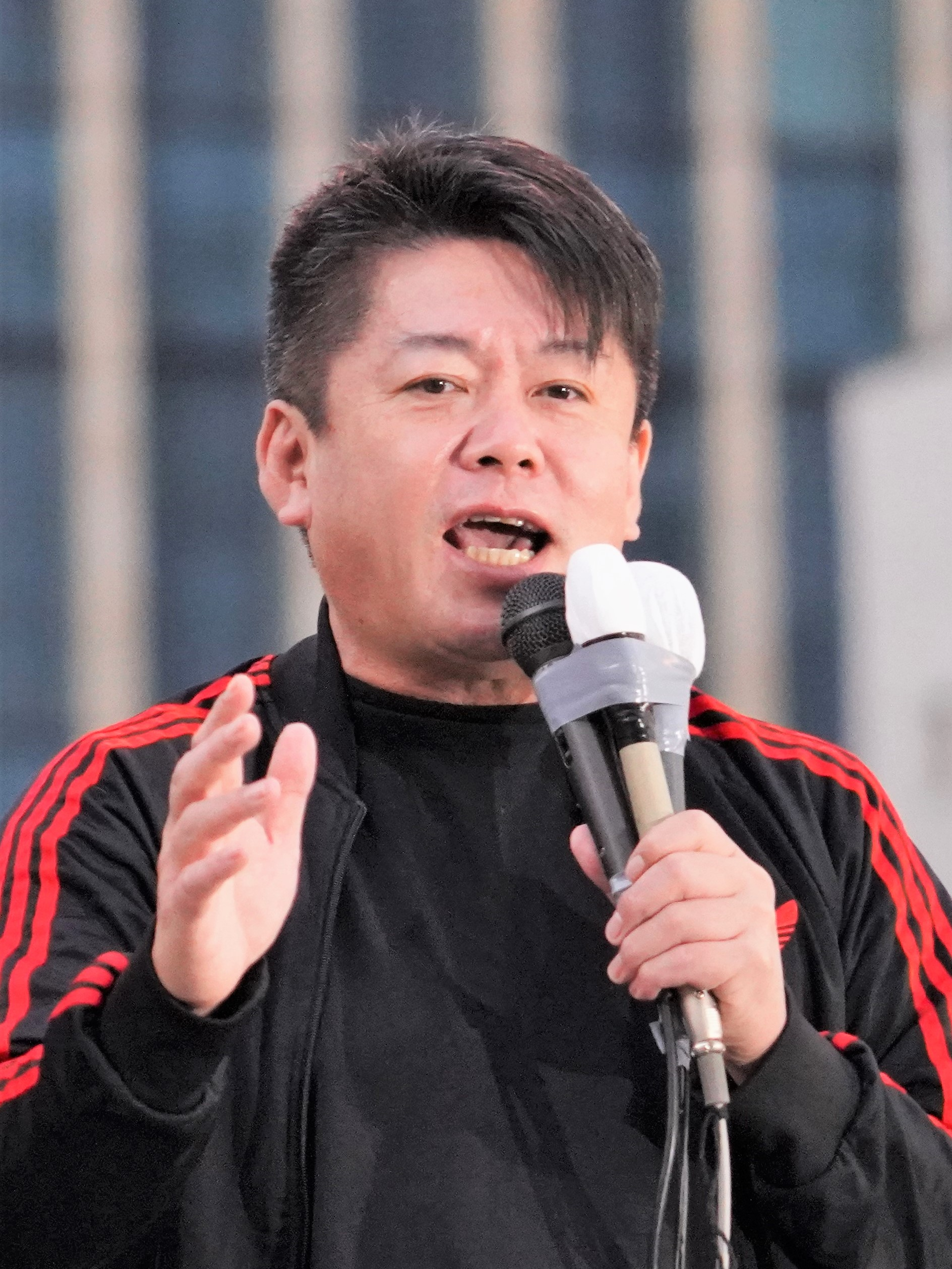
- Horie in 2021
- Born: October 29, 1972 (age 53); Yame, Fukuoka, Japan
- Other name: Horiemon
- Education: Kurume College Affiliated Middle – High School
- Occupations: Entrepreneur, writer, investor, tarento
- Known for: Livedoor

YouTube information
- Channel: 堀江貴文 ホリエモン
- Years active: 2009-present
- Genre: entertainment
- Subscribers: 1.9 million
- Views: 711 million
- Last updated: July 15, 2024

Takafumi Horie (堀江 貴文, Horie Takafumi; born October 29, 1972) is a Japanese entrepreneur who founded Livedoor, a website design operation that grew into a popular internet portal. After being arrested and charged with securities fraud in 2006, he severed all connections with the company. His trial began on September 4, 2006. On March 16, 2007, Horie was sentenced to imprisonment of 2 years and 6 months.

He is popularly known as Horiemon (ホリエモン) due to his resemblance to Doraemon, the chubby robot cat in a popular Japanese cartoon. The name Horiemon was also given to a racehorse he owned, after the name had been chosen by voting on a Livedoor website.

== Early life ==
Horie was born in Yame, Fukuoka Prefecture, Japan, and was raised in a respected household by a corporate father and mother from a farming landlord family.

He was a student at the department of literature at the University of Tokyo and was going to major in religion, but dropped out after establishing a company called Livin' on the Edge in 1995 with friends and classmates, which became the precursor to Livedoor.

== Business career ==
In 2004, Horie tried to buy the Kintetsu Buffaloes baseball team. The team rejected the offer, but the incident put him in the national spotlight.

Horie was criticized by conservative business circles in Japan for his unconventional manner – everything from his informal attire to the practice of corporate expansion through hostile takeover.

In 2005, Horie founded Interstellar Technologies rocket company. Horie unveiled a plan for space tourism at the 56th International Astronautical Congress in Fukuoka in 2005. The spacecraft he planned to develop was based on the design of the Russian TKS spacecraft. Horie said that he planned to invest in space development and that he wanted to launch a crewed rocket within five years. The project was called "Japan Space Dream – A Takafumi Horie Project".

As a business owner of wagyu-promoting organization and a writer of food-related books, Horie has been known for his several remarks against veganism and vegetarianism where he commented on his Twitter as I don't want to see the world being turned into somewhere we can't eat delicious meats because of these people, and I will crush them thoroughly., triggering further controversies.

== Political career ==
Horie announced on August 19, 2005, that he would run in the snap 2005 general election as an independent in the Hiroshima sixth district. He contemplated running as an official LDP candidate against LDP rebel Shizuka Kamei, but chose instead to run as an independent, while keeping the support of the LDP leadership. He lost the election and returned to Tokyo to continue his business career. Kamei won the election in a rather close count of 110,979 to 84,433.

In May 2020, Takashi Tachibana founded the Horiemon New Party, named after Horie and using his likeness in their campaign ads. However, Horie has disclaimed any connection to the party and is not running as a candidate.

== Arrest and imprisonment for securities fraud ==
Japanese prosecutors raided the offices of Livedoor and Horie's home in January 2006 on suspicion of securities fraud. The government cited several instances of apparent market manipulation, including a Livedoor subsidiary announcing it would acquire a company that it already controlled, using misleading investment partnership accounting and artificially inflating the value of Livedoor stock through stock splits to fund acquisitions. The veracity of the suspicions aside, many smelled conspiracy given the timing of the action. It was seen as a political move by defenders of the status quo to punish Horie for daring to challenge them, and to discredit him and the business practices he had come to represent, which Horie's opponents considered distasteful and "un-Japanese".

Livedoor's share price fell 14.4 percent in one day, with sell orders so numerous that trading volume prompted the Tokyo Stock Exchange to close 20 minutes early for the first time in its history. The Nikkei index lost 465 points, its largest drop in nearly two years; the ramifications were felt in other markets around the world, especially in Asia. Horie's net worth was estimated to have fallen from $1.3 billion in December 2005 to $280 million in June 2006.

Horie was arrested by Tokyo district public prosecutors on January 23, and on January 24, he announced his resignation as CEO. On April 27, 2006, he was released on ¥300 million bail on the condition that he refrain from any contact with Livedoor or its employees. Horie said he would not participate in the company's management again. Though indicted on charges of fabricating financial reports and spreading false information to investors, he continued to assert his innocence. His trial for securities fraud began on September 4, 2006. Prosecutors sought a four-year prison sentence for Horie, who pleaded not guilty. In March 2007, he was found guilty of falsifying the company's accounts and misleading investors and was sentenced to 2 years and 6 months imprisonment. He appealed the punishment, but the Supreme Court of Japan on April 26, 2011 upheld the sentence.

Horie maintained a digital newsletter from his prison cell and communicated with the outside world through staffers who posted to Twitter on his behalf. He lost more than 60 pounds while in prison, which he attributed to the bland food served there. He was released on parole in March 2013 after 21 months behind bars.

Horie promotes his own portfolio of businesses through his company, SNS.
