= Ken'ichirō Saitō =

Japanese YouTuber and politician (born 1980)

- 齊藤 健一郎
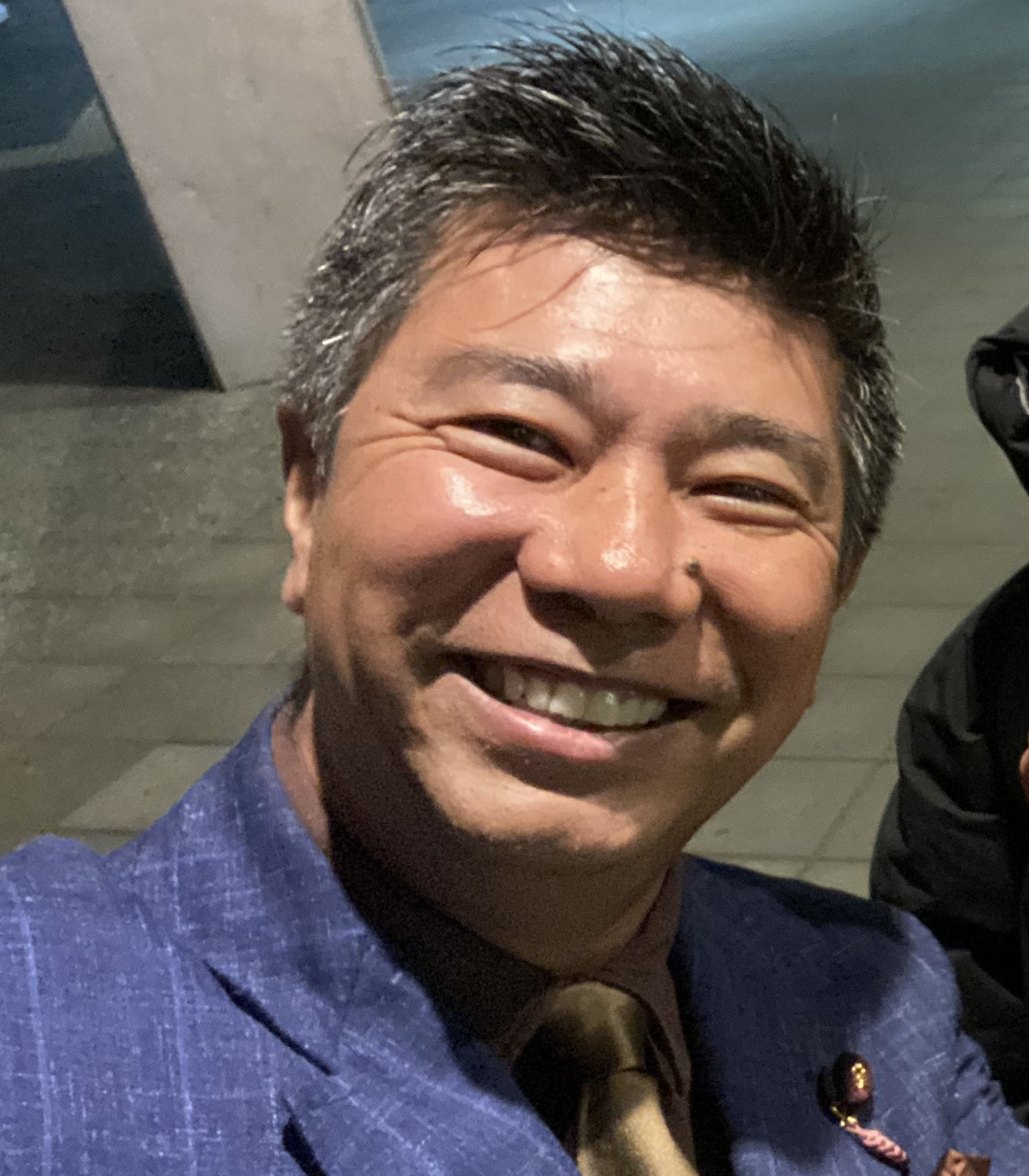
- Sato in 2024

Member of the House of Councillors
- Incumbent
- Assumed office 24 March 2023
- Preceded by: Yoshikazu Higashitani
- Constituency: National PR

Personal details
- Born: Ken'ichirō Saitō; 25 December 1980 (age 45) Amagasaki, Hyōgo, Japan
- Party: Independent (since 2025)
- Other political affiliations: Horiemon New Party (formerly); NHK Party (formerly); Protect the People from NHK (formerly)
- Education: Nara Gakuen University
- Occupation: Businessman • YouTuber • Politician

Ken'ichirō Saitō (born 25 December 1980) is a Japanese businessman, politician and YouTuber. He is a member of the House of Councillors since 2022, formerly of the political organization NHK Party. He is also the former accounting officer of the Horiemon New Party.
