= Horiemon New Party =

Horiemon New Party ホリエモン新党
- Leader: Takashi Tachibana
- Founder: Takashi Tachibana
- Founded: 20 May 2020
- Headquarters: 401 Trust Shin-Koiwa, Shin-Koiwa 1-1-1, Katsushika Ward, Tokyo, Japan
- Ideology: Anti-NHK license policy Moderation of the Broadcasting Act (conditional access for NHK); Cashless society Direct democracy Populism
- Political position: Right-wing
- National affiliation: NHK Party
- Colors: Sky blue and yellow
- Slogan: "Destroy Corona Self-Restraint!"
- Tokyo Metropolitan Assembly: 0 / 127

Website
- horiemonparty.com

The Horiemon New Party (ホリエモン新党, Horiemon Shintō) is a Japanese regional political party based in Tokyo founded by Takashi Tachibana on 20 May 2020. The party is named after Takafumi Horie, an Internet entrepreneur whose nickname is "Horiemon", which is derived from time-traveling cartoon robot cat Doraemon; however, Horie has publicly disclaimed any connection to the party.

== Ideology ==
The party's policies include "stopping the infodemic" and reopening Tokyo in wake of the COVID-19 pandemic. Other policies include abolishing cash, abolishing road tolls and public transport ticketing, rebuilding Edo Castle and legalizing cannabis. The party has also inherited many policies from its national affiliate, The Party to Protect the People from NHK, including abolishing Japanese public broadcaster NHK and eliminating TV license fees.

== Electoral history ==
The party unsuccessfully contested the 2020 Tokyo gubernatorial election, winning 0.72% of the vote. Yuriko Koike of Tomin First was re-elected with 59.70%.
