= Takashi Tachibana =

Japanese politician (born 1967)

- 立花 孝志
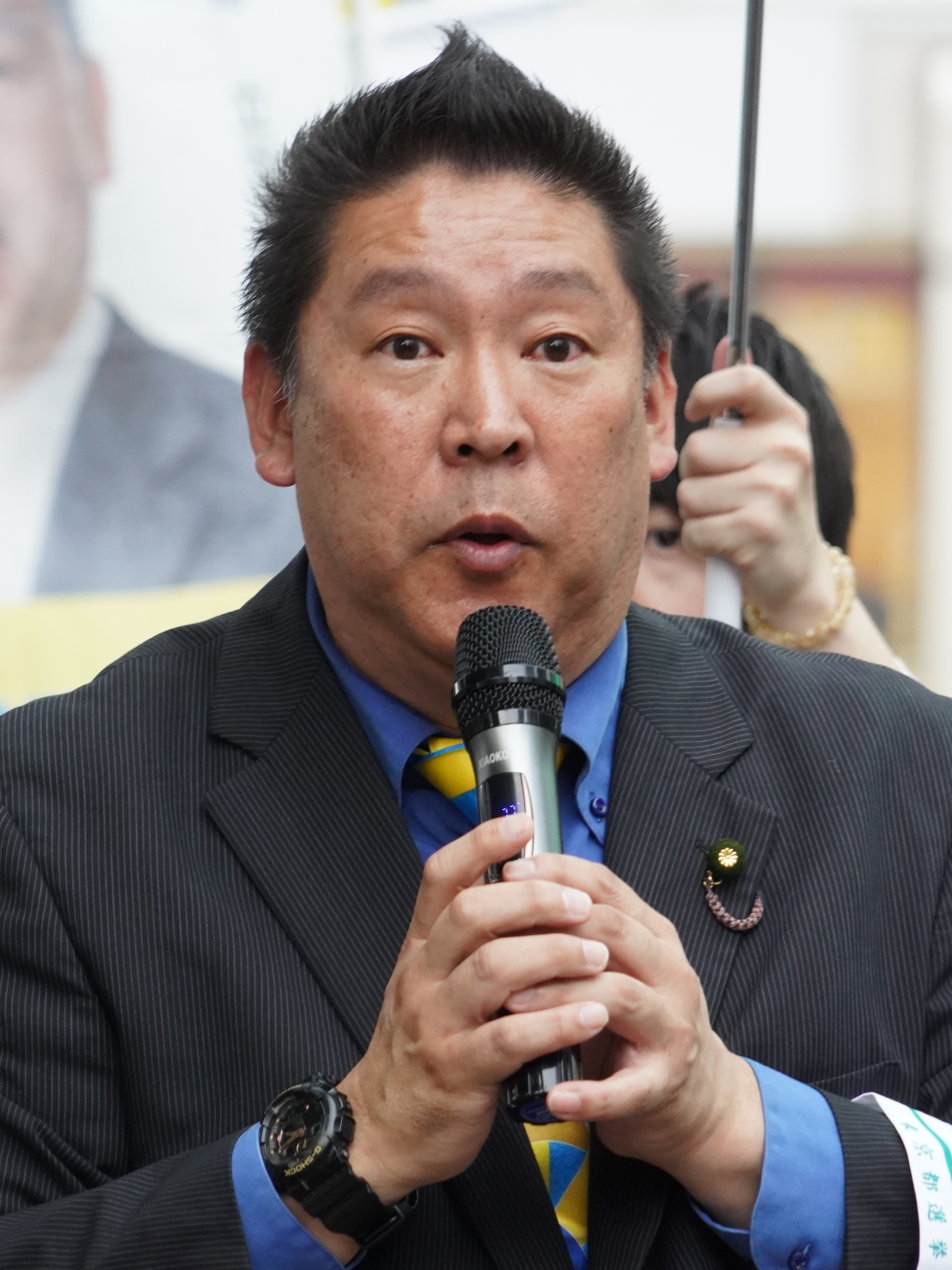
- Tachibana in 2024

Leader of the NHK Party
- Incumbent
- Assumed office 7 April 2023 (Disputed with Ayaka Otsu)
- Deputy: Hodaka Maruyama
- Preceded by: Ayaka Otsu
- In office 17 June 2013 – 8 March 2023
- Deputy: Hodaka Maruyama
- Preceded by: Position established
- Succeeded by: Ayaka Otsu

Leader of the Horiemon New Party
- Incumbent
- Assumed office 20 May 2020
- Preceded by: Position established

Member of the House of Councillors
- In office 29 July 2019 – 10 October 2019
- Preceded by: Multi-member district
- Succeeded by: Satoshi Hamada
- Parliamentary group: Minna no Tō
- Constituency: National PR

Member of the Katsushika Ward Assembly
- In office 13 November 2017 – 26 May 2019

Member of the Funabashi City Assembly
- In office 1 May 2015 – 14 July 2016

Personal details
- Born: 15 August 1967 (age 59) Izumiōtsu, Osaka, Japan
- Party: NHK Party (National); Horiemon New (Prefectural)
- Other political affiliations: Minna no Tō (until 2013)
- Occupation: Social activist, journalist, accountant, politician
- Criminal information
- Criminal charge: Defamation
- Capture status: Arrested

Details
- Date apprehended: 2025

Takashi Tachibana (立花 孝志, Tachibana Takashi; born 15 August 1967) is a Japanese social activist, journalist, accountant and politician who is the founder and former leader of the NHK Party (NHK党, NHK tō). A former assemblyman for the Funabashi City Assembly and the Katsushika Ward Assembly, he was elected to the House of Councillors in the July 2019 regular election on his party's proportional representation list. He automatically forfeited his seat on 10 October when he officially became a candidate in the October 2019 by-election to the House of Councillors for a majoritarian seat in Saitama.

== Career ==
He was an accountant, program producer and executive assistant of Katsuji Ebisawa, the chairman of NHK from 1997 through 2005. He leaked information about NHK's accounting scandals to the Shukan Bunshun in 2005, which forced him to retire. He founded an internet watchdog TV show concentrating on NHK in 2011.

== Political career ==
He worked briefly in Osaka for the once-Democratic Party representative Hiroyuki Moriyama, before becoming a brief supporter of the Your Party. He then founded the NHK Receipt Fee Nonpayment Party on the 17th of June in 2013. He later changed its name to "The Party to Protect the People from NHK" and became its representative. Following this, he ran for a few local offices, including Settsu City Council in 2013, and then the Machida City Council in 2014. He lost both, but managed to win a seat on the Funabashi City Council in 2015. He resigned from the seat to then run in the 2016 Tokyo gubernatorial election, which he lost and placed 8th in with 0.42% of the vote.

In November 2017, he won the Katsushika ward assembly election in Tokyo at 2,954 votes. On 27 December, the Tokyo District Court dismissed his request to sue the owner of one seg cell phone for the contract of NHK bill collection. In June 2018, the Tokyo High Court supported the district court's decision.

Tachibana leads The Party to Protect the People from NHK, which distributes stickers for the purpose of expelling NHK reception bill collectors. He supports scrambled broadcasting of NHK, such that only viewers who want to watch NHK need to pay the broadcast fees.

Tachibana was elected as a member of Japan's House of Councillors at the election for the House of Councillors at 2019.

He acknowledged he had bipolar disorder and schizophrenia.

In May 2020, Tachibana founded the Horiemon New Party. Tachibana named the party after entrepreneur Takafumi Horie (who was given the nickname "Horiemon" due to his resemblance to the manga character Doraemon) and uses Horie's likeliness in campaign ads. Despite this, Horie has publicly stated that he does not have any connection to the party and that Tachibana used his name and likeliness without his permission.

Tachibana then used the Horiemon New Party as a platform to run for the 2020 Tokyo gubernatorial election. He spent over 9 million yen on candidates for the party, and, as a result, ran three candidates for the office, himself included. The two extra candidates were part of a strategy to give Tachibana three times as much space as other candidates, and his name was the only one that appeared on posters for the other two candidates. Ultimately, he won 43,912 votes, or 0.72% of the total. He placed sixth overall. All together, counting the extra two candidates, his party won 0.89% of the vote.

The Anti-NHK party then ran candidates in the 2021 Japanese general election, but failed to win any seats, falling short of the national proportional vote requirement. However, in the 2022 Japanese House of Councillors election, his party won over 2% of the vote total, meaning that it won an extra House of Councillors seat. This thus gave it 2 in the House of Councillors, meaning that it now held more seats than the successors to the Japan Socialist Party, the Social Democratic Party.

In March 2023, Tachibana resigned as leader of the NHK Party. He stated this was over the controversy caused by the former House of Councilors member GaaSyy, who was expelled from the House of Councilors following his failure to report to the diet and give a formal apology due to his repeated absences. GaaSyy had an arrest warrant out for him over threats made by him online, and despite the immunity given to members of the House of Councilors, opted not to return to Japan. Tachibana stated he "[had] to take responsibility as the party leader[.]" He also renamed the party to Seijika Joshi 48, and was succeeded by Ayaka Otsu, a former child actor, as leader of the Seijika Joshi 48.

In 2024, he ran in the Hyogo gubernatorial election but conducted an unusual campaign, urging people to vote for Motohiko Saitō instead of himself. Saitō was re-elected, and Tachibana lost the election.

He ran in the 2025 Chiba gubernatorial election, which was held on 16 March 2025. During his campaign period, he decided to make speeches in Hyogo. He lost to the incumbent Toshihito Kumagai, placing third.

On 14 March 2025, Tachibana was attacked by a man, 30-year old Shion Miyanishi, with an axe during a political rally in front of the Ministry of Economy, Trade and Industry in Tokyo, he was seen pressing his hand against his ear as it was bleeding. The perpetrator claimed he intended to murder Takashi, and various sources such as Nippon Television have described it as an assassination attempt.

On 9 November 2025, he was arrested by the Hyogo Prefectural Police on suspicion of defamation against prefectural assembly members during the Hyogo gubernatorial election in 2024, such as Hideaki Takeuchi, who committed suicide due to online attacks. According to the Prefectural Police, he was specifically arrested for spreading misinformation about Hideaki on street speeches and social media, claiming that he was under police investigation.

== Controversies ==
=== Shingo Watanabe video ===
Tachibana published a video about Shingo Watanabe, a member of Settsu city assembly. The video alleged that Watanabe knew the condition of the corpse of Moritomo Gakuen officials. Watanabe made a libel for criminal charge and damages against Tachibana. The Tokyo High Court, in charge of criminal litigation, charged him with an indemnification in the civil litigation and ordered a fee of 300,000 yen. Watanabe then criticized Tachibana who insisted that the case was without foundation, stated that there was a problem in the law mind spirit, and refused to pay the 300,000 yen fee.

=== Comments justifying genocide ===
In September 2019, Tachibana was reported by Asahi Shimbun to have appeared in a video where he appeared to justify the use of genocide as a solution for overpopulation. In the video, he also questioned Japan's aid for underdeveloped countries, saying that poverty and violence were part of "The natural order God created." He also stated in reference to third world countries: "It's impossible to teach dogs. (They're) close to being dogs. There are an overwhelming number of people like that in the world. These countries have babies to the point of idiocy." In a subsequent video issued on his YouTube channel, he rejected these reports, said he was not in favor of such policies, and that he only said these things in order to generate controversy and media coverage.

=== Conviction for forcible obstruction of business ===
In September 2019, Tachibana recorded video footage of a business mobile terminal displaying the personal information of NHK subscribers. In November 2019, he contacted the NHK and threatened to release the subscriber information online. This resulted in the broadcaster being forced to provide explanations to relevant subscribers. Tachibana was subsequently tried and convicted of forcible obstruction of business. In January 2022, he received a suspended sentence of two and a half years in prison.

=== Defamation indictment ===
In November 2025, Tachibana was arrested and indicted on charges of defaming Hyōgo Prefectural Assembly member Hideaki Takeuchi during the 2024 Hyogo gubernatorial election. It was suspected that he was attempting to move to Dubai to avoid arrest. Takeuchi had been tasked with investigating claims of workplace bullying under the administration of incumbent Hyōgo governor Motohiko Saitō. Tachibana developed a harassment campaign which repeatedly targeted Takeuchi both online on social media and in-person and defamed his character over his role in the investigation; this campaign likely influenced Takeuchi's resignation from the assembly after Saitō won re-election in November 2024 and his eventual suicide the following January.

== Electoral record ==
| Date | Election | Constituency | Nomination | Votes | Share | Total candidates | Rank achieved | Rank needed to win | Result |
|---|---|---|---|---|---|---|---|---|---|
| 8 September 2013 | Settsu City (Osaka) assembly general | (at-large) | N-Koku | 317 | 1.1% | 29 | 25 | 21 | Lost |
| 23 February 2014 | Machida City (Tokyo) assembly general | (at-large) | N-Koku | 1,589 | 1.1% | 41 | 38 | 36 | Lost |
| 26 April 2015 | Funabashi City (Chiba) assembly general | (at-large) | N-Koku | 2,622 | 1.4% | 73 | 35 | 50 | Won (forfeited/resigned mid-term) |
| 31 July 2016 | Tokyo Metropolis gubernatorial | (at-large) | N-Koku | 27,241 | 0.4% | 21 | 8 | 1 | Lost |
| 22 January 2017 | Ibaraki City (Osaka) assembly general | (at-large) | N-Koku | 1,531 | 1.7% | 43 | 33 | 28 | Lost |
| 2 July 2017 | Tokyo Metropolis assembly general | Katsushika City | N-Koku | 4,463 | 2.4% | 8 | 8 | 4 | Lost |
| 12 November 2017 | Katsushika City (Tokyo) assembly general | (at-large) | N-Koku | 2,954 | 1.9% | 59 | 33 | 40 | Won (forfeited/resigned mid-term) |
| 9 June 2019 | Sakai City (Osaka) mayoral | (at-large) | N-Koku | 14,110 | 5.1% | 3 | 3 | 1 | Lost |
| 21 July 2019 | 25th House of Councillors regular | proportional N-Koku list | N-Koku | 987,885 (Note: Party proportional vote result); 130,233 (Note: Tachibana's individual preference vote result within the N-Koku list) | 2.0% 88.8% | 13: (Note: Lists standing in proportional election) 155 (Note: Total number of candidates standing in proportional election); 4 | n/a (Note: The proportional district elects 50 members by proportional representation, not by a majoritarian (FPTP/SNTV) system); 1 | 50; 1 | Won (forfeited/resigned mid-term) |
| 27 October 2019 | 24th House of Councillors by-election | Saitama | N-Koku | 168,289 | 13.6% | 2 | 2 | 1 | Lost |
| 10 November 2019 | Ebina City (Kanagawa) mayoral | (at-large) | N-Koku | 2,990 | 5.5% | 3 | 3 | 1 | Lost |
| 24 November 2019 | Sakurai City (Nara) mayoral | (at-large) | N-Koku | 1,294 | 8.3% | 2 | 2 | 1 | Lost |
| 8 December 2019 | Koganei City (Tokyo) mayoral | (at-large) | N-Koku | 678 | 1.7% | 4 | 4 | 1 | Lost |
| 5 July 2020 | Tokyo Metropolis gubernatorial | (at-large) | Horiemon New | 43,912 | 0.72% | 22 | 6 | 1 | Lost |
| 16 March 2025 | Chiba Prefecture gubernatorial | (at-large) | N-Koku | 79,060 | 4.8% | 4 | 3 | 1 | Lost |
