= GaaSyy =

Japanese politician and YouTuber

Yoshikazu Higashitani
- 東谷 義和

Member of the House of Councillors
- In office 26 July 2022 – 14 March 2023
- Preceded by: Multi-member district
- Succeeded by: Kenichiro Saito
- Constituency: National PR

Personal details
- Born: Yoshikazu Higashitani; 6 October 1971 (age 55) Itami, Hyōgo, Japan
- Party: NHK Party (2022–2023)
- Education: Hannan University
- Occupation: Media personality
- Criminal information
- Status: On probation
- Criminal charges: 2023: Violation of the Act on Punishment of Violent Acts and Witness intimidation
- Penalty: Suspended sentence (2024); 3-year imprisonment

Yoshikazu Higashitani (東谷 義和, Higashitani Yoshikazu; born October 6, 1971), also known as GaaSyy (ガーシー, Gāshī), is a Japanese politician, YouTuber, and businessman. He was elected into the House of Councillors in 2022 as part of the NHK Party, but was expelled on March 15, 2023 for not attending any sessions of Parliament. The following day, the Tokyo Metropolitan Police Department sought an arrest warrant for alleged defamation of celebrities in his YouTube videos. On June 4, 2023, the Metropolitan Police Department arrested Higashitani immediately upon his arrival at Narita Airport on suspicion of habitually threatening celebrities and others.

== Career ==
GaaSyy rose to prominence in 2022 after starting a YouTube channel where he spoke about alleged scandals in the entertainment industry. Of note was his coverage of the Johnny Kitagawa sexual abuse scandal, where GaaSyy was described by the sexual abuse victim and former Johnny's Jr. member Kauan Okamoto as "the only person in Japanese media to cover the story at the time". His channel gained 1.3 million subscribers before being shut down in July of that year. His success led Takashi Tachibana, the leader of the fringe NHK Party that focuses on reforms to the Japanese public broadcaster NHK, to recruit him for the 2022 Japanese House of Councillors election. GaaSyy's platform included a pledge to work from overseas, and won the election with over 287,000 votes.

At the time of his election, GaaSyy lived in Dubai, United Arab Emirates. In August 2022 he skipped what would have been his first day as a lawmaker because he feared arrest, on grounds of alleged fraud and defamation against celebrities, if he came to Japan. GaaSyy skipped all future House of Councillors sessions, instead continuing to post on his social media channels.

In January 2023, locations linked to GaaSyy and his advertising revenue management company were raided by police to investigate alleged defamation and intimidation of celebrities as well as obstruction of business. The Tokyo Metropolitan Police Department also requested GaaSyy to appear for an interview.

In February 2023, GaaSyy was asked by the House of Councillors to fly to Tokyo and deliver an in-person apology for his continued absence during an open session, the penultimate disciplinary step before expulsion. GaaSyy initially promised to do so, but backtracked, citing fear of prosecution despite sitting parliamentarians in Japan having immunity from prosecution. His reversal led to party leader Tachibana resigning in favour of actress Ayaka Otsu. GaaSyy instead posted a video about going to Gaziantep, Turkey to help in the recovery efforts after the February 2023 earthquake.

The disciplinary committee of the House of Councillors voted to expel him on March 14, which was made official by the whole body the following day. The final expulsion vote passed 235–1, with the only "no" vote being his fellow party member, Satoshi Hamada. The expulsion was the first in over 70 years, and the first ever instance of expulsion for non-attendance. After the expulsion vote, party leader Ayaka Otsu expressed disappointment, noting that he had openly campaigned on working from abroad, so his constituents would not be upset by remote work.

The expulsion meant that GaaSyy no longer had immunity from prosecution afforded to parliamentarians while parliament was in session. On March 16, 2023, Tokyo Metropolitan Police Department requested an arrest warrant for GaaSyy over alleged defamation in his social media videos, as well as for his editor. It also requested that the Ministry of Foreign Affairs demand the return of GaaSyy's passport.

On April 14, 2023, the Metropolitan Police Department announced that it had issued an international arrest warrant for him through Interpol. On June 4, 2023, the Metropolitan Police Department arrested Higashitani immediately upon his arrival at Narita Airport on suspicion of habitually threatening celebrities and others. He was later indicted with habitual intimidation and forcible obstruction of business. On July 12, 2023, his request for bail was denied by Tokyo District Court. On September 21, 2023, he was released on bail. On March 14, 2024, GaaSyy was convicted by the Tokyo District Court and was given a suspended sentence of three years' imprisonment.

== See also ==
- Fidias Panayiotou a YouTuber that got elected as an MEP for Cyprus
