= 2020 Tokyo gubernatorial election =

Election for Governor of Tokyo

- 5 July 2020
- Turnout: 55.00% ▼4.73 pp
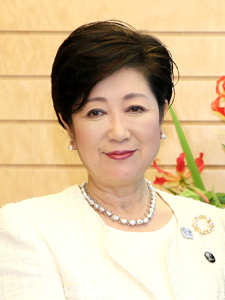

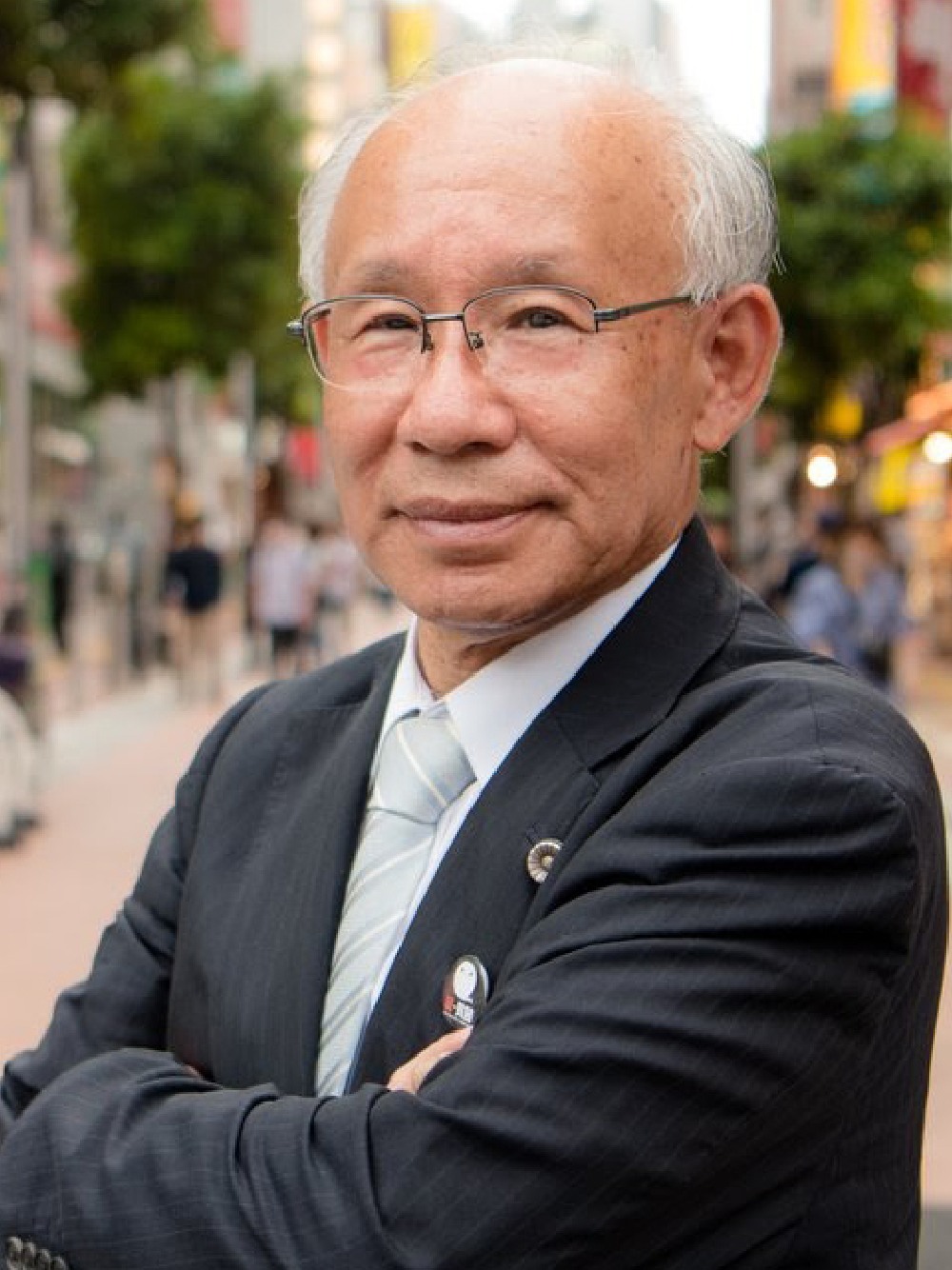

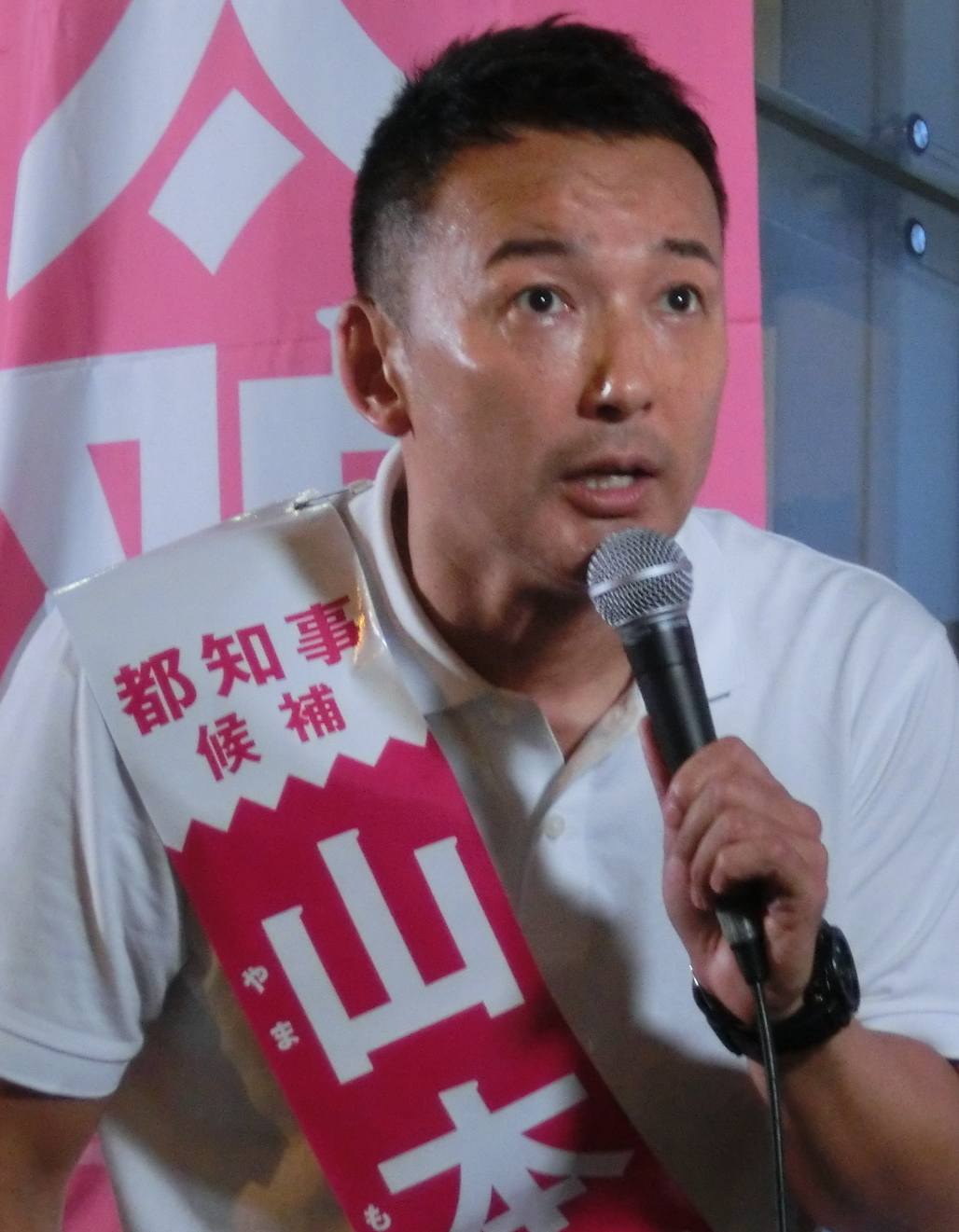

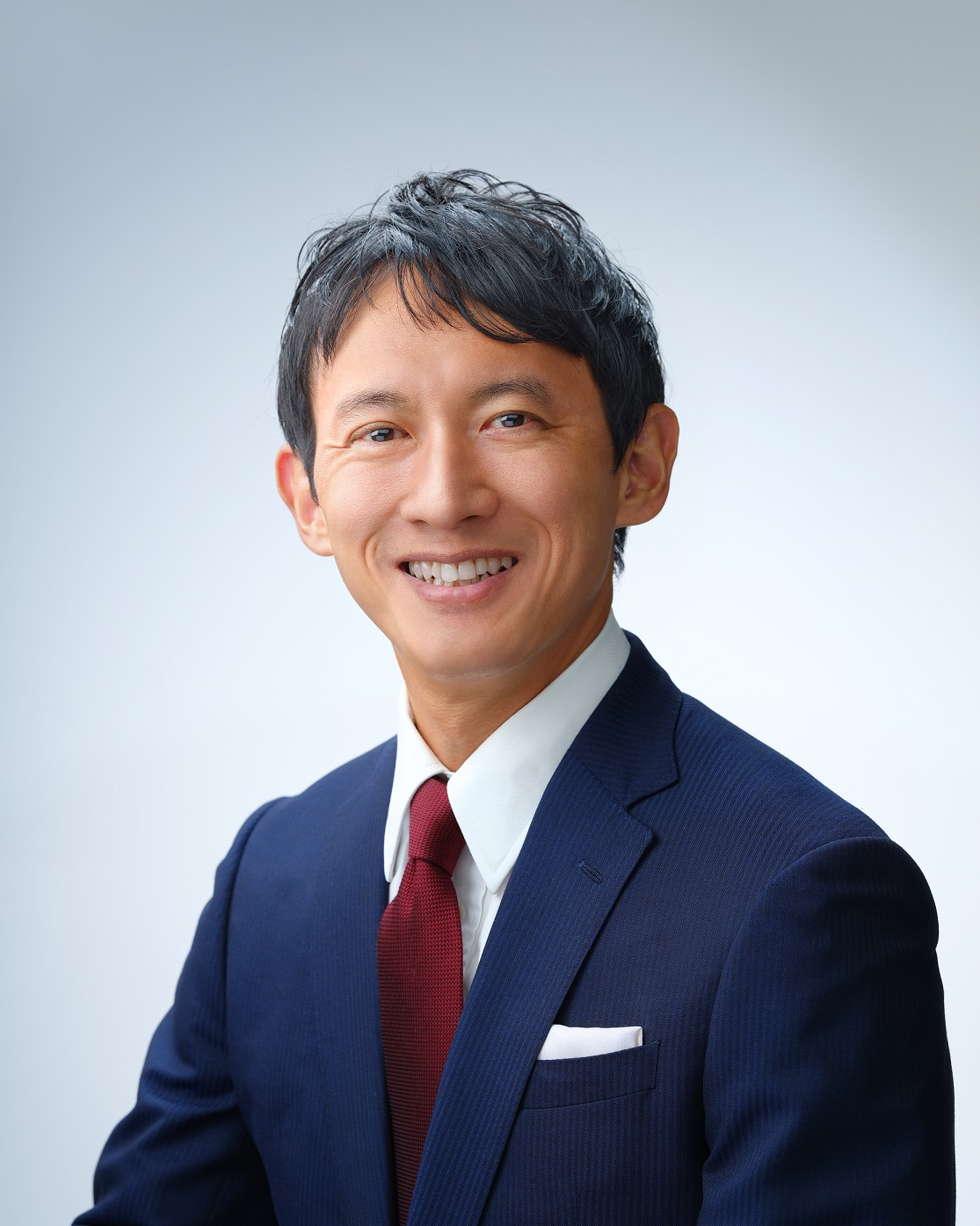
Candidate	Yuriko Koike	Kenji Utsunomiya
Party	Independent	Independent
Popular vote	3,661,371	844,151
Percentage	59.7%	13.76%
Supported by	Tomin First	CDP, DPFP, JCP, SDP
Candidate	Tarō Yamamoto	Taisuke Ono
Party	Reiwa Shinsengumi	Independent
Popular vote	657,277	612,530
Percentage	10.72%	9.99%
Supported by	DPFP	Ishin
- Election results by municipalities. Incumbent governor Yuriko Koike swept all municipalities with more than 50% of popular votes.
Governor before election
Yuriko Koike
Independent
Elected Governor
Yuriko Koike
Independent

The 2020 Tokyo gubernatorial election took place on 5 July 2020 to elect the Governor of Tokyo. In a result viewed as an endorsement of her handling of Tokyo's response to the COVID-19 pandemic, incumbent Yuriko Koike was re-elected for a second term in a landslide, increasing her share of the vote to 59.7%.

== Candidates ==
A total of 22 candidates registered candidacies for the election.

Incumbent Governor Yuriko Koike announced her campaign for re-election on 12 June 2020. Similar to her first campaign for Governor, Koike ran as an independent and did not receive the endorsement of any party, aside from the support of the regional Tomin First party which she founded in 2017. The ruling Liberal Democratic Party considered endorsing Koike in the 2020 election, unlike in the 2016 gubernatorial election in which the party endorsed a separate candidate, however the party ultimately chose not to endorse any candidate, instead encouraging members to vote freely. Koike was widely expected to win a second term, based on opinion polling conducted in the weeks prior the election.

Kenji Utsunomiya, a lawyer and former chairman of the Japan Federation of Bar Associations, announced his candidacy on 28 May 2020. Utsunomiya was considered the main opposition to Koike, having received endorsements from a coalition of opposition parties including the Constitutional Democratic Party, the Communist Party and the Social Democratic Party. This was Utsunomiya's third campaign for Governor of Tokyo, having also ran in the 2012 and 2014 elections.

Other notable candidates included Tarō Yamamoto, a former actor who founded the anti-establishment and anti-nuclear energy party Reiwa Shinsengumi in 2019, Taisuke Ono, the former Vice Governor of Kumamoto, whose candidacy received the endorsement of Nippon Ishin no Kai, Makoto Sakurai, a far-right activist and the founder and leader of the Japan First Party, and Takashi Tachibana, the head of the NHK Party and a former member of the House of Councillors.

Tokyo Review described the election as a "circus" viewed by many candidates as marketing opportunity:

For less than $30,000, each candidate gets several minutes to broadcast whatever they want on NHK, an official statement delivered to every single household in Tokyo, and a prime outdoor location on every street in the city for their posters for two weeks.

== Results ==
Tokyo gubernatorial election, 2020
Party	Candidate	Votes	%	±%
Independent (Supported by Tomin First)	Yuriko Koike (incumbent)	3,661,371	59.7%	▲15.21%
Independent (Supported by Constitutional Democratic, Democrats for the People, Communist, Social Democratic)	Kenji Utsunomiya	844,151	13.76%	N/A
Reiwa Shinsengumi (Supported by Democrats for the People)	Tarō Yamamoto	657,277	10.72%	N/A
Independent (Supported by Ishin)	Taisuke Ono	612,530	9.99%	N/A
Japan First	Makoto Sakurai	178,784	2.92%	▲1.23%
Horiemon New Party (Supported by NHK Party)	Takashi Tachibana	43,912	0.72%	▲0.20%
Happiness Realization	Hiroko Nanami	22,003	0.36%	▼0.08%
Independent	Teruki Gotō	21,997	0.36%	▲0.25%
Independent	Shion Sawa	20,738	0.34%	N/A
Independent	Makoto Nishimoto	11,887	0.19%	N/A
Smile	Hiroshi Komiyama	10,935	0.18%	▼0.60%
People's Sovereignty Party	Masayuki Hiratsuka	8,997	0.15%	N/A
Horiemon New Party (Supported by NHK Party)	Osamu Hattori	5,453	0.09%	N/A
Horiemon New Party (Supported by NHK Party)	Kenichirō Saitō	5,114	0.08%	N/A
Independent	Hiroshi Ichikawa	4,760	0.08%	N/A
Independent	Hisao Naitō	4,145	0.07%	N/A
Independent	Yasuhiro Sekiguchi	4,097	0.07%	▲0.05%
Independent	Hideyuki Takemoto	3,997	0.07%	N/A
Independent	Hitoshi Ishi	3,356	0.05%	N/A
Independent	Yasuhiro Nagasawa	2,955	0.05%	N/A
Independent	Seiichi Oshikoshi	2,708	0.04%	N/A
Independent	Kazue Ushio	1,510	0.02%	N/A
Turnout		6,132,679	55%	▼4.73%

=== Results by municipality ===
Municipality	Yuriko Koike		Kenji Utsunomiya		Taro Yamamoto		Taisuke Ono		Makoto Sakurai		Takashi Tachibana	
Municipality	Votes	%	Votes	%	Votes	%	Votes	%	Votes	%	Votes	%
Total	3,661,371	59.70%	844,151	13.76%	657,277	10.72%	612,530	9.99%	178,784	2.92%	43,912	0.72%
Chiyoda	16,727	54.77%	3,950	12.93%	3,013	9.87%	4,775	15.64%	1,065	3.49%	272	0.89%
Chuo	43,300	56.42%	8,559	11.15%	7,769	10.12%	12,581	16.39%	2,274	2.96%	722	0.94%
Minato	51,426	52.70%	12,876	13.20%	11,227	11.51%	16,031	16.43%	2,994	3.07%	946	0.97%
Shinjuku	79,320	54.80%	22,187	15.33%	16,405	11.33%	17,431	12.04%	4,952	3.42%	1,267	0.88%
Bunkyo	61,103	54.42%	18,612	16.58%	10,892	9.70%	15,209	13.55%	3,101	2.76%	835	0.74%
Taito	54,082	58.51%	11,646	12.60%	10,131	10.96%	10,262	11.10%	3,365	3.64%	795	0.86%
Sumida	76,302	62.01%	13,719	11.15%	12,823	10.42%	12,396	10.07%	4,042	3.28%	1,019	0.83%
Koto	140,185	60.46%	28,888	12.46%	22,793	9.83%	26,296	11.34%	6,613	2.85%	1,846	0.80%
Shinagawa	108,373	58.78%	23,831	12.93%	18,220	9.88%	22,726	12.33%	5,419	2.94%	1,763	0.96%
Meguro	66,838	53.08%	19,138	15.20%	15,380	12.22%	17,753	14.10%	3,270	2.60%	989	0.79%
Ota	194,095	60.30%	40,069	12.45%	32,349	10.05%	34,201	10.63%	10,075	3.13%	2,576	0.80%
Setagaya	239,191	54.69%	68,709	15.71%	52,688	12.05%	53,463	12.22%	11,609	2.65%	2,783	0.64%
Shibuya	54,248	51.65%	16,705	15.91%	13,718	13.06%	13,950	13.28%	3,139	2.99%	929	0.88%
Nakano	83,070	54.23%	25,236	16.47%	18,258	11.92%	16,294	10.64%	5,369	3.51%	1,244	0.81%
Suginami	143,992	52.66%	48,350	17.68%	33,096	12.10%	32,078	11.73%	8,090	2.96%	1,782	0.65%
Toshima	71,714	58.01%	17,518	14.17%	13,425	10.86%	12,698	10.27%	4,297	3.48%	958	0.77%
Kita	97,776	60.30%	22,729	14.02%	16,547	10.20%	15,091	9.31%	4,806	2.96%	1,156	0.71%
Arakawa	55,892	61.63%	11,199	12.35%	9,616	10.60%	8,488	9.36%	2,863	3.16%	675	0.74%
Itabashi	148,856	60.42%	33,965	13.79%	25,981	10.55%	21,835	8.86%	7,991	3.24%	1,986	0.81%
Nerima	200,645	59.89%	46,866	13.99%	35,239	10.52%	32,228	9.62%	9,984	2.98%	2,405	0.72%
Adachi	179,516	65.38%	29,943	10.90%	29,396	10.71%	19,352	7.05%	8,380	3.05%	1,955	0.71%
Katsuhika	123,297	63.97%	21,586	11.20%	21,229	11.01%	15,038	7.80%	6,004	3.12%	1,372	0.71%
Edogawa	180,714	65.19%	27,198	9.81%	28,021	10.11%	23,133	8.34%	9,251	3.34%	2,016	0.73%
Hachioji	149,739	63.95%	30,558	13.05%	24,191	10.33%	16,921	7.23%	6,318	2.70%	1,536	0.66%
Tachikawa	51,253	63.75%	10,425	12.97%	8,299	10.32%	6,068	7.55%	2,166	2.69%	535	0.67%
Musashino	39,403	54.07%	13,019	17.86%	7,990	10.96%	8,592	11.79%	1,979	2.72%	423	0.58%
Mitaka	50,698	56.41%	14,701	16.36%	10,495	11.68%	9,186	10.22%	2,367	2.63%	550	0.61%
Ome	39,993	68.71%	6,385	10.97%	5,690	9.78%	3,389	5.82%	1,312	2.25%	290	0.50%
Fuchu	71,272	61.83%	15,272	13.25%	11,957	10.37%	10,361	8.99%	3,407	2.96%	716	0.62%
Akishima	32,178	66.30%	5,894	12.14%	4,544	9.36%	3,354	6.91%	1,286	2.65%	314	0.65%
Chofu	65,097	58.48%	16,266	14.61%	12,531	11.26%	11,206	10.07%	3,137	2.82%	707	0.64%
Machida	122,849	63.66%	24,935	12.92%	19,753	10.24%	15,481	8.02%	4,950	2.57%	1,160	0.60%
Koganei	32,567	56.89%	10,028	17.52%	5,899	10.30%	5,955	10.40%	1,410	2.46%	329	0.57%
Kodaira	52,314	60.09%	13,048	14.99%	8,890	10.21%	8,205	9.42%	2,305	2.65%	501	0.58%
Hino	54,065	61.97%	12,488	14.31%	8,824	10.11%	6,885	7.89%	2,311	2.65%	596	0.68%
Higashimurayama	41,898	62.52%	9,913	14.79%	6,857	10.23%	4,904	7.32%	1,653	2.47%	395	0.59%
Kokubunji	35,347	57.81%	10,235	16.74%	6,243	10.21%	6,155	10.07%	1,582	2.59%	409	0.67%
Kunitachi	21,146	56.86%	6,590	17.72%	4,230	11.37%	3,405	9.16%	882	2.37%	225	0.60%
Fussa	14,523	66.18%	2,361	10.76%	2,282	10.40%	1,503	6.85%	653	2.98%	140	0.64%
Komae	24,251	59.15%	6,502	15.86%	4,482	10.93%	3,640	8.88%	1,027	2.51%	260	0.63%
Higashiyamato	24,655	65.80%	4,927	13.15%	3,587	9.57%	2,479	6.62%	907	2.42%	192	0.51%
Kiyose	21,016	61.37%	5,714	16.69%	3,506	10.24%	2,315	6.76%	838	2.45%	183	0.53%
Higashikurume	32,466	61.98%	8,198	15.65%	5,322	10.16%	3,993	7.62%	1,201	2.29%	248	0.47%
Musashimurayama	19,306	69.25%	3,047	10.93%	2,714	9.74%	1,469	5.27%	710	2.55%	147	0.53%
Tama	42,259	59.69%	11,058	15.62%	7,731	10.92%	6,130	8.66%	1,733	2.45%	470	0.66%
Inagi	26,522	63.26%	5,095	12.15%	4,204	10.03%	3,878	9.25%	1,054	2.51%	306	0.73%
Hamura	16,062	67.95%	2,724	11.52%	2,211	9.35%	1,519	6.43%	573	2.42%	124	0.52%
Akiruno	24,819	70.13%	3,913	11.06%	3,284	9.28%	1,831	5.17%	823	2.33%	173	0.49%
Nishitokyo	56,941	60.02%	14,019	14.78%	10,150	10.70%	8,704	9.18%	2,520	2.66%	551	0.58%
Mizuho	9,754	74.53%	987	7.54%	1,161	8.87%	623	4.76%	296	2.26%	49	0.37%
Hinode	5,451	71.78%	832	10.96%	612	8.06%	386	5.08%	147	1.93%	24	0.32%
Hinohara	955	77.58%	97	7.88%	108	8.77%	38	3.09%	8	0.65%	3	0.24%
Okutama	2,195	79.50%	186	6.74%	201	7.28%	82	2.97%	40	1.45%	5	0.18%
Oshima	2,657	70.35%	483	12.79%	293	7.76%	179	4.74%	56	1.48%	12	0.32%
To-shima	155	81.58%	16	8.42%	7	3.68%	10	5.26%	1	0.53%	0	0.00%
Niijima	1,278	80.73%	113	7.14%		5.56%	51	3.22%	31	1.96%	6	0.38%
Kozushima	830	82.18%	45	4.46%	65	6.44%	36	3.56%	14	1.39%	6	0.59%
Miyake	1,048	78.62%	98	7.35%	87	6.53%	49	3.68%	27	2.03%	7	0.53%
Mikurajima	114	59.38%	33	17.19%	23	11.98%	9	4.69%	7	3.65%	2	1.04%
Hachijo	2,737	74.21%	302	8.19%	363	9.84%	168	4.56%	53	1.44%	17	0.46%
Aogashima	71	69.61%	11	10.78%	15	14.71%	3	2.94%	0	0.00%	0	0.00%
Ogasawara	825	62.79%	154	11.72%	172	13.09%	59	4.49%	48	3.65%	10	0.76%

== Simultaneous legislative by-elections ==
Four by-elections to the assembly were held together with the gubernatorial election: in Ota Ward, Kita Ward, Hino City and the North Tama 3rd electoral district (=Chofu City+Komae City). All four were won by LDP candidates.
