= Tomu Tanigawa =

Japanese politician (born 1976)

- 谷川 とむ
- Official portrait, 2026

Member of the House of Representatives
- Incumbent
- Assumed office 8 February 2026
- Preceded by: Nobuhisa Ito
- Constituency: Osaka 19th
- In office 19 December 2014 – 9 October 2024
- Constituency: Kinki PR

Personal details
- Born: 27 April 1976 (age 50) Amagasaki, Hyōgo, Japan
- Party: Liberal Democratic
- Parent: Shuzen Tanigawa (father)
- Education: Tokai University; University of Osaka

Tomu Tanigawa (谷川とむ, Tanigawa Tomu; born 27 April 1976) is a Japanese politician. He has been a member of the House of Representatives since 2026, having previously served from 2014 to 2024. He is the son of Shuzen Tanigawa.
