= Kenshiro Matsunami =

Japanese politician (born 1946)

- 松浪 健四郎
- Official portrait, 2007

Member of the House of Representatives
- In office 12 September 2005 – 21 July 2009
- Constituency: Kinki PR
- In office 21 October 1996 – 10 October 2003
- Preceded by: Constituency established
- Succeeded by: Takashi Nagayasu
- Constituency: Osaka 19th

Personal details
- Born: 14 October 1946 (age 80) Izumisano, Osaka, Japan
- Party: Liberal Democratic
- Other political affiliations: NFP (1994–1998); LP (1998–2000); NCP (2000–2003)
- Education: Nippon Sport Science University; Eastern Michigan University; Nihon University

Kenshiro Matsunami (松浪 健四郎, Matsunami Kenshirō; born 14 October 1946) is a retired Japanese politician of the Liberal Democratic Party, who served as a member of the House of Representatives in the Diet (national legislature). A native of Izumisano, Osaka, he attended Nippon Sport Science University, Eastern Michigan University and Nihon University. He was elected to the House of Representatives for the first time in 1996 as a member of the New Frontier Party. After losing his seat in 2003, he was re-elected in 2005 and served until 2009 as a member of the LDP.
