= Makoto Nishimoto =

Japanese politician (born 1986)

- 西本 誠
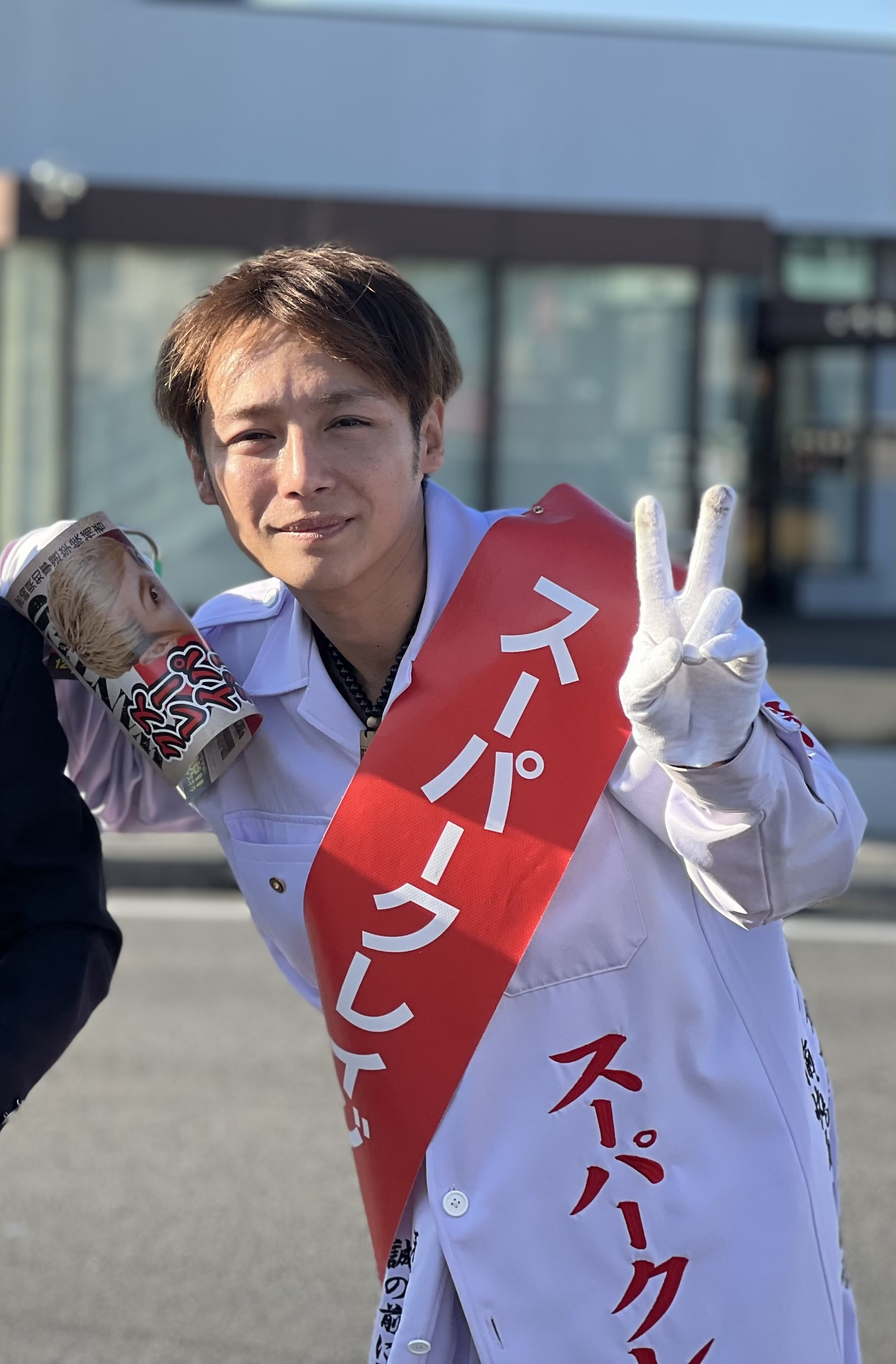
- Nishimoto in 2022

Miyazaki City Councilor
- In office April 30, 2023 – February 22, 2024; Suspended since November 27, 2023

Toda City Councilor
- In office February 6, 2021 – March 4, 2022 (Note: He is technically not elected by law)

Personal details
- Born: August 14, 1986 (age 40) Miyazaki, Miyazaki, Japan
- Party: Super Crazy-kun Party
- Children: 1
- Nickname: Super Crazy-kun
- Criminal information
- Conviction: May 21, 2024
- Criminal charges: non-consensual sexual intercourse resulting in injury
- Penalty: 4 years and 6 months

Details
- Imprisoned at: Saga Juvenile Prison

Makoto Nishimoto (Japanese: 西本 誠, Hepburn: Nishimoto Makoto; born August 14, 1986), also known as "Super Crazy-kun" (スーパークレイジー君, Sūpā Kureijī-kun) is a former Japanese politician. He was elected as city councillor of Toda, Saitama in 2021, but later the city election commission overturned his win due to a violation of the Japanese Public Offices Election Law in 2022. He was then elected as city councilor of Miyazaki City in 2023. He resigned after being arrested for sexually assaulting a female acquaintance in September 2023. He was charged with sexual assault in May 2024.

== Early life ==
Nishimoto was born on August 14, 1986, in Miyazaki city, Miyazaki Prefecture. His father is part of a yakuza gang and his mother left him when he was one year old. Nishimoto grew up with his grandmother. He joined a bōsōzoku gang and was sent to juvenile detention centers three times during his third year of middle school. In an interview with the Tokyo Shimbun, he stated that during his third detention, he was unable to see his grandmother before she died, which caused his change of heart.

== Political career ==
=== Tokyo gubernatorial election ===
Nishimoto moved to Tokyo at the age of twenty-one and worked as a club employee and caregiver in Ginza. He also worked as a singer and performed in live concerts. He ran for the 2020 Tokyo gubernatorial election because he wanted to "raise his profile". He ran under his nickname, "Super Crazy-kun", but it was rejected. Nishimoto was then allowed to run under his real name. He lost the election, garnering only 11,887 votes.

=== Toda City councillor (2021–2022) ===
In 2021, Nishimoto attempted to run for city councillor for Toda City, Saitama Prefecture, where he ran again using his nickname "Super Crazy-kun" and was approved by the city election commission. He campaigned while wearing a kamikaze uniform. He won by garnering 912 votes and placing 26th out of the 36 seats within the city council. He was addressed as "Super Crazy Councillor (スーパークレイジー君議員, Sūpākureijī-kun giin)" during the preliminary session.

The Toda City Election Commission later received various complaints from citizens claiming that he did not live in the city for more than three months as required by the Japanese Public Offices Election Law. Nishimoto denied the claims, stating in various interviews that he moved to an apartment in the city in late September 2020, changing his residency from Tokyo's Chūō ward to Toda City on October 5, 2020 in order to run for the election. On April 9, the city election commission revoked his election, stating that the apartment where he resided since September 2020 was still in someone else's name, failing to prove that he actually lives in Toda City. Nishimoto responded in an interview with Sankei Shimbun that he lived in the house in Tokyo where his wife and child live, but "he slept in Toda City". He filed a lawsuit against the Toda City Election Commission on April 13 at the Saitama Prefectural Election Commission, but it was later dismissed in July. He then appealed to the Tokyo High Court to have the ruling overturned in the same month, but the lawsuit also was dismissed. Nishimoto then announced that he would file an appeal in the Supreme Court of Japan on October 15, but the appeal was rejected on March 4, 2022. On March 9, the Toda City Election Commission officially revoked his win.

=== Mayoral election and Miyazaki gubernatorial election ===
Nishimoto decided to run for mayor of Toda City after learning the incumbent mayor Fumihito Sugawara was running uncontested. He lost the election by a wide margin, garnering only 2,529 votes against his opponent's 37,092 votes. In April 2022 he enrolled at Nihon University in the Faculty of Law, Department of Politics and Economics. He stated that he decided not to run for the Japanese House of Councillors.

In November 2022, Nishimoto announced that he would run for governor of Miyazaki Prefecture. He ran against incumbent governor Shunji Kōno, former governor Hideo Higashikokubaru, and former House of Councillors member Yoshiro Yokomine. He lost the election, garnering only 7,679 votes.

=== Miyazaki City councillor and sexual assault trial (2023–2024) ===
In January 2023, Nishimoto announced that he would be running for councillor of Miyazaki City. He won a seat in the Miyazaki City Council after garnering 4,195 votes, the second highest among the 61 candidates in the election.

On September 6, 2023, he was arrested after allegedly sexually assaulting and injuring a female acquaintance on September 3. Nishimoto denied this allegation and apologized to his supporters. On September 11, the Miyazaki City Council unanimously passed a resolution to recommend his resignation, but according to his lawyer, Nishimoto did not wish to resign.

On September 27, 2023, the Miyazaki District Public Prosecutors Office indicted Nishimoto on charges of non-consensual sexual intercourse resulting in injury. On the same day, at a press conference held at Miyazaki City Hall, Nishimoto's lawyer revealed that he had generally admitted to the charges. However, he stated that "he did not use strong violence, and he did not remove her clothes, and that he would seek the lesser charge of non-consensual indecent assault at the trial. On December 26, the Miyazaki District Court ruled to grant bail to Nishimoto. On February 22, 2024, Nishimoto resigned as councilor. On May 24, 2024, the Miyazaki District Court sentenced Nishimoto to four years and six months in prison. He was incarcerated in August 2024 and is currently serving his sentence at Saga Juvenile Prison.

== Electoral history ==
Election Year	Position	Party	Votes for Nishimoto				Result
Election Year	Position	Party	Total	%	Plc.	Swing	Result
2020	Governor	Super Crazy-kun Party	11,887	0.19	10th	N/A	Lost
2021	Councilor	Super Crazy-kun Party	912	–	25th	N/A	Won
2022	Mayor	Super Crazy-kun Party	2,529	6.3	2nd	N/A	Lost
2023	Governor	Super Crazy-kun Party	7,679	1.5	3rd	N/A	Lost
2023	Councilor	Super Crazy-kun Party	4,195	–	2nd	N/A	Won
