= Ayaka Otsu =

Japanese politician and child actress

- 大津 綾香
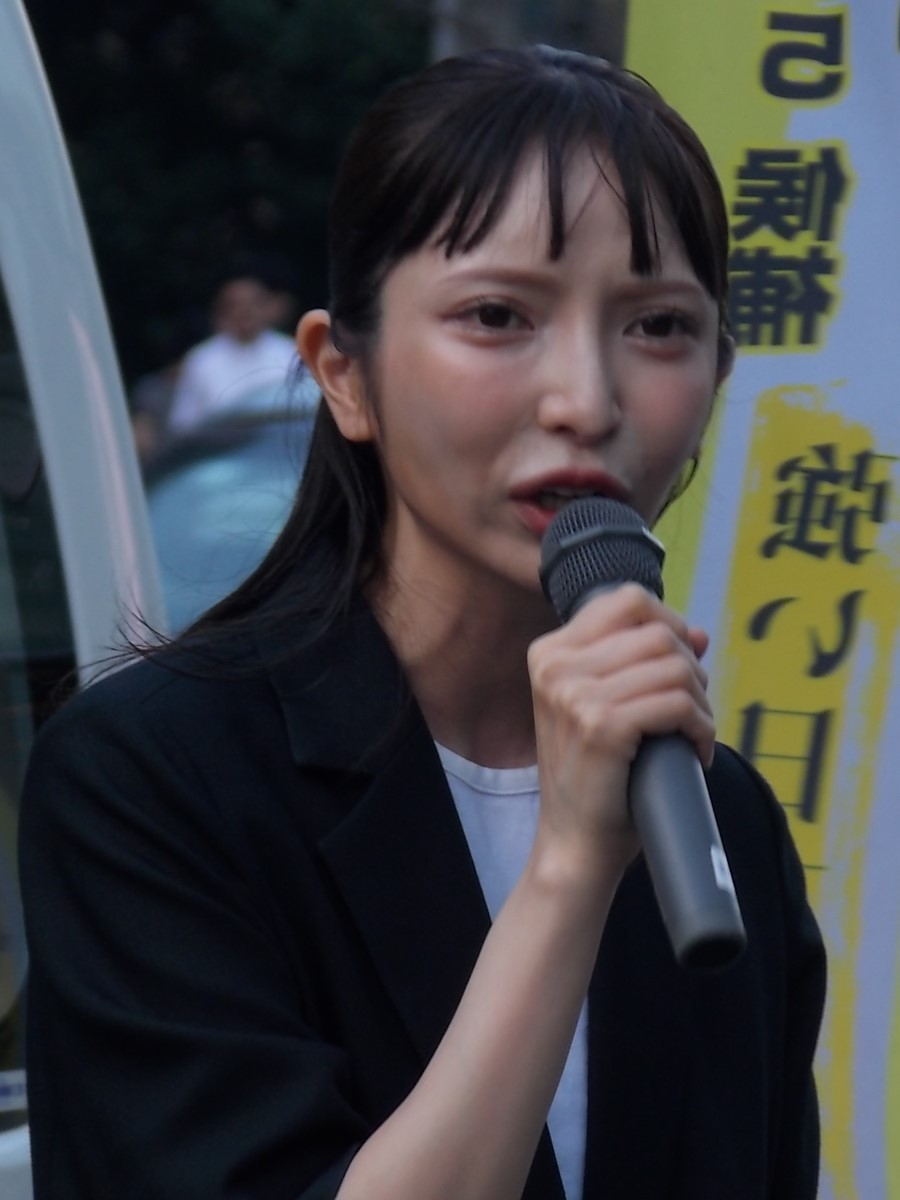
- Otsu in 2025

Leader of The Collaborative Party
- Incumbent
- Assumed office 8 March 2023 (Disputed with Takashi Tachibana since 7 April 2023)
- Preceded by: Takashi Tachibana

Personal details
- Born: 18 November 1992 (age 33) Yokosuka, Kanagawa, Japan
- Party: Collaborative
- Education: Nihon University (dropped out)
- Occupation: Politician

Ayaka Otsu (大津 綾香, Ōtsu Ayaka; born 18 November 1992) is a Japanese politician and former child actress who is the disputed de jure leader of The Collaborative Party. She was an agent of Five Eight Ltd. during her active years as a child actress.

== Early life ==
Otsu was born in Yokosuka, Kanagawa. She grew up in Yokosuka and Zushi until she was in high school. In her childhood years, Otsu was a child actress. For three years from 2002 to 2005, Otsu appeared as Akira Ikegami's daughter in NHK's "Weekly Children's News". Otsu retired from the entertainment industry when she was in junior high school. Since then, she moved to the United States before moving back to Japan to study architecture at Nihon University College of Art, but dropped out. After leaving college, Otsu worked at an architectural firm as an architectural designer.

== Political career ==
In January 2023, Otsu saw a candidate application advertisement on YouTube for the NHK Party, which was founded by Takashi Tachibana. Otsu decided to apply. On January 13, 2023, the NHK Party held a press conference announcing their 36 candidates for the 2023 Japanese local elections. In the press conference, it was announced that Otsu will be the party's candidate for the Meguro City Assembly.

On March 8, 2023, NHK party leader Takashi Tachibana announced his resignation after party member GaaSyy (Yoshikazu Higashitani), a member of the House of Councillors was expelled for not attending any sessions of Parliament. Tachibana changed the name of the NHK Party to "Seijika Joshi 48 Party" and announced that Otsu would be appointed as the successor leader of the party.

On March 12, Otsu dropped out of the Meguro City Assembly election, and filed her candidacy for the Kanagawa gubernatorial election, which would take place on April 9. Seijika Joshi's candidate for the election was Juna Ichikawa, but decided to drop out in favour of Otsu.

Otsu was defeated in the Kanagawa gubernatorial election on April 9, placing 3rd out of 4 candidates. On the following day, April 10, Otsu announced her intention to run for the Meguro Ward election for the second time, which was scheduled for April 26, but was defeated, placing 48th out of 57 candidates.

=== Leadership dispute ===
On April 7, 2023, former party leader Tachibana announced that Otsu had been dismissed from the party leader position on March 29, and that she had been expelled from the party on April 6. Otsu posted on her Twitter, account "I haven't resigned as the leader of Seijika Joshi, I don't approve the announcement", fueling the leadership dispute between the two.

As of December 2023, Japan's Ministry of Internal Affairs and Communications continues to recognize Otsu as the party leader. Despite this, most of the party defected and switched allegiance to Tachibana, resulting in a deadlock where Otsu is the de jure leader while Tachibana is the de facto leader.

In November 2023, Otsu changed the name of the party to The Collaborative Party.

In June 2024, Otsu made a criminal complaint against Tachibana for allegedly stalking her. In October 2024, the Tokyo Metropolitan Police Department filed charges against him.

== Filmography ==
Film
Year	Title	Role	Notes
2000	Home Sweet Home	N/A	N/A
2001	Waterboys	Girl in the Aquarium	2001 Comedy Film.
Television
Year	Title	Role	Notes
2000	Virtual Girl	N/A	2000 TV series, Episode 1, NTV.
2000	Food Fight	Yuki Kurahashi	2000 TV series, NTV.
2000	Scary Sunday ~2000~	Kaori	2000 TV series, Episode 3, NTV.
2000	Mirai Sentai Timeranger	N/A	2000 TV series, TV Asahi
2000	Worst date ever	N/A	2000 TV series, Episode 14, NTV.
2001	Little girl Anna	Makoto Otsuki as a child	2001 TV series, Fuji TV.
2004	Scary stories that actually happened	N/A	2005 TV series, Fuji TV.
2002–2005	Weekly Children's News	Akira Ikegami's daughter	1994–2010 Children's Television newscast, NHK
2003	Strange stories of the world: Autumn special edition	N/A	2004 TV series, Fuji TV.
2003	Hi-vision Special: Records of the Edo era	N/A	2003 TV series, NHK BS Premium subscribers exclusive.
