= Takashi Nagayasu =

Japanese politician

- 長安 豊
- Official portrait, 2012

Member of the House of Representatives
- In office 9 November 2003 – 16 November 2012
- Preceded by: Kenshiro Matsunami
- Succeeded by: Hodaka Maruyama
- Constituency: Osaka 19th

Personal details
- Born: 5 September 1968 (age 58) Izumisano, Osaka, Japan
- Party: CDP (since 2020)
- Other political affiliations: DPJ (2003–2016); DP (2016–2017); KnT (2017–2018); DPP (2018–2020)
- Education: University of Tokyo

Takashi Nagayasu (長安 豊, Nagayasu Takashi; born 5 September 1968) is a former Japanese politician of the Democratic Party of Japan, who served as a member of House of Representatives in the Diet (national legislature). A native of Izumisano, Osaka and graduate of the University of Tokyo he was elected for the first time in 2003 and served until 2012.
