= Livedoor =

Japanese Internet company

- Native name: 株式会社ライブドア
- Formerly: Edge Co.
- Company type: Kabushiki gaisha
- Industry: Internet service
- Founded: 1995
- Founder: Takafumi Horie
- Defunct: 2012
- Headquarters: Nishi-Shinjuku, Tokyo, Japan

livedoor Co., Ltd. (株式会社ライブドア, Kabushiki-gaisha Raibudoa) was a Japanese company that functioned as an Internet service provider (ISP) and operator of a web portal and blog platform before being brought down by a scandal in 2006. The company was founded and led in its first 10 years by Takafumi Horie, known as "Horiemon" in Japan. Livedoor grew into one of Japan's premier Internet businesses, putting over 1,000 employees on its payroll at its peak. Its reliance on acquisitions and stock swap mergers to achieve growth also made it one of the country's most controversial enterprises. Its growth came to a resounding halt when scandal erupted in early 2006. An investigation of securities law violations led to a nosedive in the company's stock price. The Tokyo Stock Exchange delisted Livedoor on April 14, 2006. The floundering company's properties were purchased by South Korea–based NHN Corporation in 2010.

The ISP and blog services that bear the Livedoor name used to be operated by Line Corporation, developers of Line messaging services and the Naver Japan search portal from 2012–2022. Line Corporation, based in Japan, was spun off from NHN Japan, an arm of its Korean parent, in February 2013.

In 2022, Livedoor was sold to Minkabu. In February of the same year, its founder Takafumi Horie became executive advisor to livedoor.

== History ==
=== Origins and growth ===
Livedoor began in 1995 as Livin' on the Edge, a startup company run by Horie and a group of college friends and was officially founded as Livin' On the EDGE Inc. in April 1996, in Minato, Tokyo. In 1997, it was renamed Livin' On the EDGE Co., Ltd. Though initially a limited company (yugen kaisha), Livin' On the Edge was reorganized into a joint-stock company (kabushiki kaisha) in July 1997 and within only 3 years, went public on the Tokyo Stock Exchange's Mothers market in April 2000. In November 2002, Livin' on the Edge acquired the free Internet services business of Livedoor Corp., which had gone bankrupt. Livin' On the Edge changed its name to Edge Co., Ltd. in April 2003, then adopted the name of the ISP business it had acquired from Livedoor Corp., by renaming itself livedoor Co. Ltd. (Livedoor), in February 2004. This was followed by a 1:100 stock split.

In March 2004, during the 2004 Nippon Professional Baseball realignment, Livedoor moved to acquire the Kintetsu Buffaloes, a Japanese baseball team, but later withdrew its offer and, in September 2004, founded its own team (named livedoor baseball) and applied for admittance to Japan's professional baseball organization. The team's home ground was to be in Sendai, Miyagi Prefecture, but livedoor lost the competition to be the city's home team to Rakuten, a Japanese e-commerce company; the team became the Tohoku Rakuten Golden Eagles and began play in 2005.

Livedoor acquisitions in the U.S. included MailCreations in Miami, Florida, in June 2004, which functioned as the company's U.S. headquarters. Livedoor entered search and contextual advertising spaces in America in November 2005.

A scandal involving securities law violations led the Tokyo Stock Exchange to delist Livedoor on April 14, 2006.

=== Allegations ===
The case broke on January 16, 2006, when Tokyo prosecutors raided several Livedoor locations, Horie's home, and the homes of other Livedoor and subsidiary executives on suspicions of securities fraud. The raids spooked investors and sent shares plunging on January 17 and 18 as a widening criminal investigation sparked panic selling on the Tokyo Stock Exchange. Some brokers announced they would no longer allow use of the issue for margin trading. Volume was so heavy that it threatened to overload the TSE's computer system, prompting a halt in trading for the entire market—a breaking record and the first time this has ever occurred. The TSE ordered Livedoor to provide a formal response to the allegations. When the company filed a hasty report after a quick internal investigation, the TSE told executives to provide a more detailed report and threatened to delist Livedoor if allegations of improper activities proved valid.

On January 18, 2006, Hideaki Noguchi, an executive of H.S. Securities, a firm raided by prosecutors earlier in the week in connection with Livedoor, was found dead in a Naha, Okinawa hotel room in what the authorities labeled a suicide.

The authorities called in several Livedoor and subsidiary executives for questioning over several days, and Horie himself on January 23. After several hours of questioning Horie, investigators felt they had learned enough to press charges and petitioned for four arrest warrants, which were granted. Horie, Livedoor's chief financial officer, and the presidents of two subsidiaries were arrested mid-evening for securities and accounting fraud. They were held for two months without bail, and during this time, Livedoor's temporary Representative Director Fumito Kumagai was also arrested.

Japan's Securities Commission filed a criminal complaint against the five arrested ex-executives of the company on March 13, 2006. Founder Horie was sentenced to 2.5 years in jail on March 16, 2007. Others were given various jail sentences four days later but appealed.

=== Aftermath ===
After losing 90% of its stock price in four months and strong evidence of securities fraud, Livedoor was delisted from the Tokyo Stock Exchange on April 14, 2006.

Fuji Television sued the company for ¥35 billion in damages in March 2007; 1,000 individual investors filed a class-action suit in May 2006, eventually rising to 3,340 asking for ¥23 billion, which resulted in a final ruling of ¥7.6 billion against Livedoor, and other similar suits resulted at least one judgment of ¥4.9 billion. Livedoor in turn sued its own executives, with founder Horie settling for ¥21 billion and six others settling for a total of ¥760 million.

Information obtained during the investigation led to the arrest and conviction of fund manager Yoshiaki Murakami for using inside information to profit off of a stake Livedoor purchased in Nippon Broadcasting System in 2005.

Horie published an autobiography during his appeals, Complete Resistance, in which he proclaims his innocence and states that he was being targeted only due to his infamy, not the actual nature or severity of any crimes.

The veracity of the suspicions aside, many smelled conspiracy given the timing of the action. It was seen as a political move by defenders of the status quo to punish Horie for daring to challenge them, and to discredit him and the business practices he had come to represent, which Horie's opponents considered distasteful and "un-Japanese."

In order to prevent a recurrence of the scandal, Japan passed a law similar to Sarbanes–Oxley, nicknamed J-SOX, on June 14, 2006.

=== Livedoor Holdings ===
In 2007, the company spun off to create a new subsidiary that retained the name of "Livedoor" and most of its portal-related businesses and itself became a pure holding company named "Livedoor Holdings" that oversaw the legal and financial management of its subsidiaries (reportedly 44 subsidiaries as of the end of 2005) including the new Livedoor. In 2008, Livedoor Holdings changed its name to "LDH Corporation."

=== Sale ===
During the upheaval in 2006 and 2007 rumors spread that Livedoor was preparing a $2 billion initial public offering in 2008. Several technology companies expressed interest in participating but the IPO never materialized. Livedoor instead put itself up for sale. In early 2010 South Korea-based NHN Corporation bought Livedoor for a reported ¥6.3 billion.

=== Liquidation ===
After completing the sale of Livedoor and other subsidiaries and paying dividends to its shareholders, LDH Corporation entered into voluntary liquidation by the shareholders' resolution in August 2011 and completed liquidation in December 2012 after distributing residual assets to its shareholders.

== Offices ==
The headquarters of the original Livedoor company were located in the Sumitomo Fudosan Nishishinjuku Building (住友不動産西新宿ビル, Sumitomo Fudōsan Nishi-Shinjuku Biru) in Nishi-Shinjuku, Shinjuku, Tokyo. Additional corporate offices were located on the 38th floor of the Roppongi Hills Mori Tower at 10-1, Roppongi 6-chome, Minato, Tokyo, 106-6138, Japan.

== See also ==
- Accounting scandals
- Line
