= Akira Ikegami =

Japanese journalist and author (born 1950)

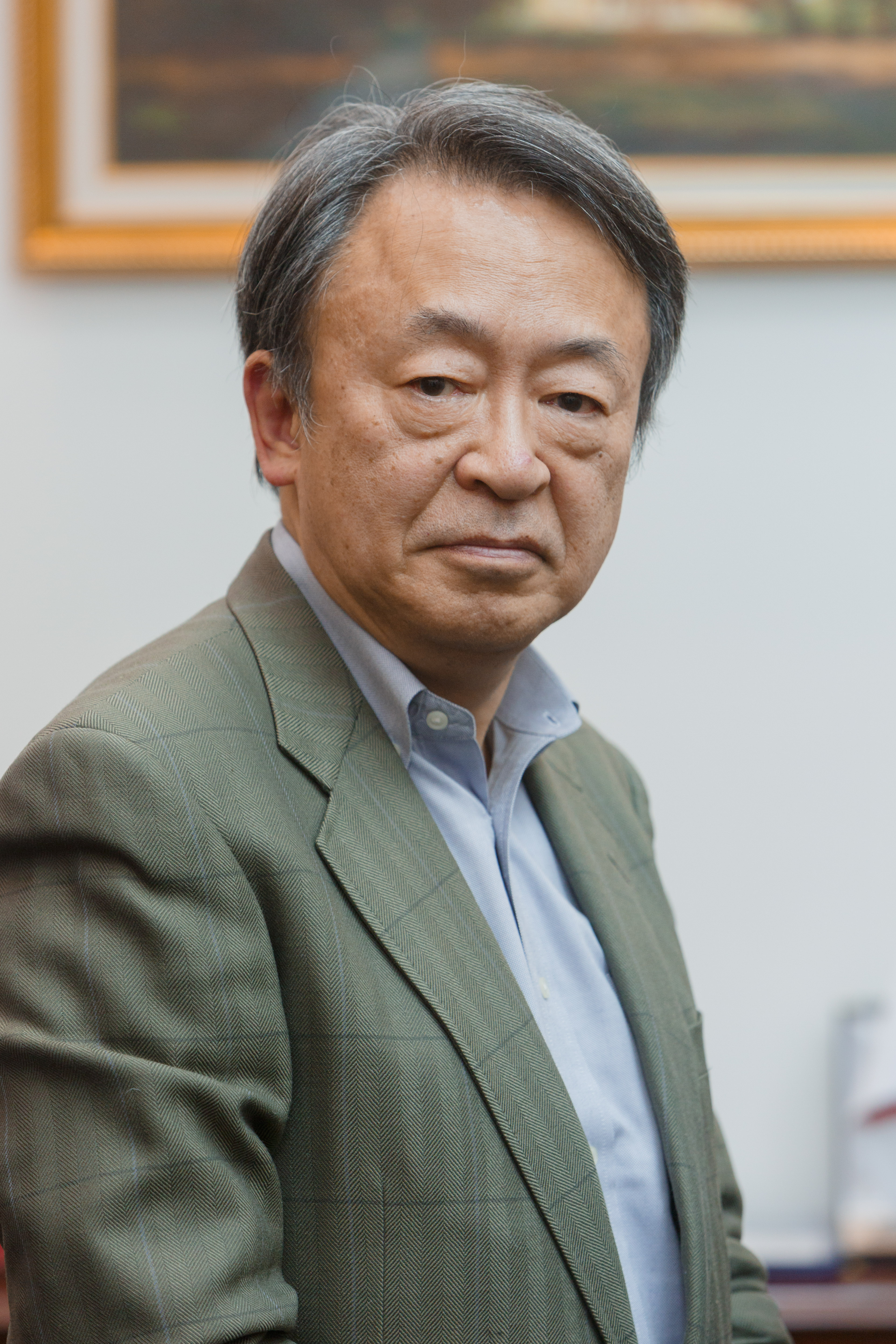
- Ikegami Akira in January 2015, visiting Moscow
- Born: August 9, 1950 (age 76); Matsumoto, Nagano Prefecture, Japan
- Occupation: Journalist

Akira Ikegami (池上彰, Ikegami Akira; born August 9, 1950) is a Japanese journalist and author.

== Life and career ==
Ikegami was born in Matsumoto, Japan. He attended and graduated Keio University in economics, and worked for NHK from 1973 to 2005, ultimately serving as the host of the network's news program for children, before resigning to work on a freelance basis.

Ikegami is most known for appearing on numerous Japanese TV programs concerning news and current affairs as a host/commentator. He has also worked as a professor and a lecturer for a number of universities including Meijo University and Tokyo Institute of Technology.

== Public profile ==
Ikegami has been ranked at or near the top as a critic, journalist and political commentator in numerous popularity surveys. He was voted an "ideal boss" in a 2012 Meiji Yasuda Life Insurance Company survey, with respondents citing his knowledge of current affairs and the ease with which he explains them.

The Liberal Democratic Party included Ikegami as a potential candidate in a poll to determine potential candidates for the 2014 Tokyo gubernatorial election, but Ikegami told the Nikkan Sports tabloid that he had no interest in running and that he had already agreed to cover the election for the Tokyo MX television station.
