= Hodaka Maruyama =

Japanese politician

- 丸山 穂高
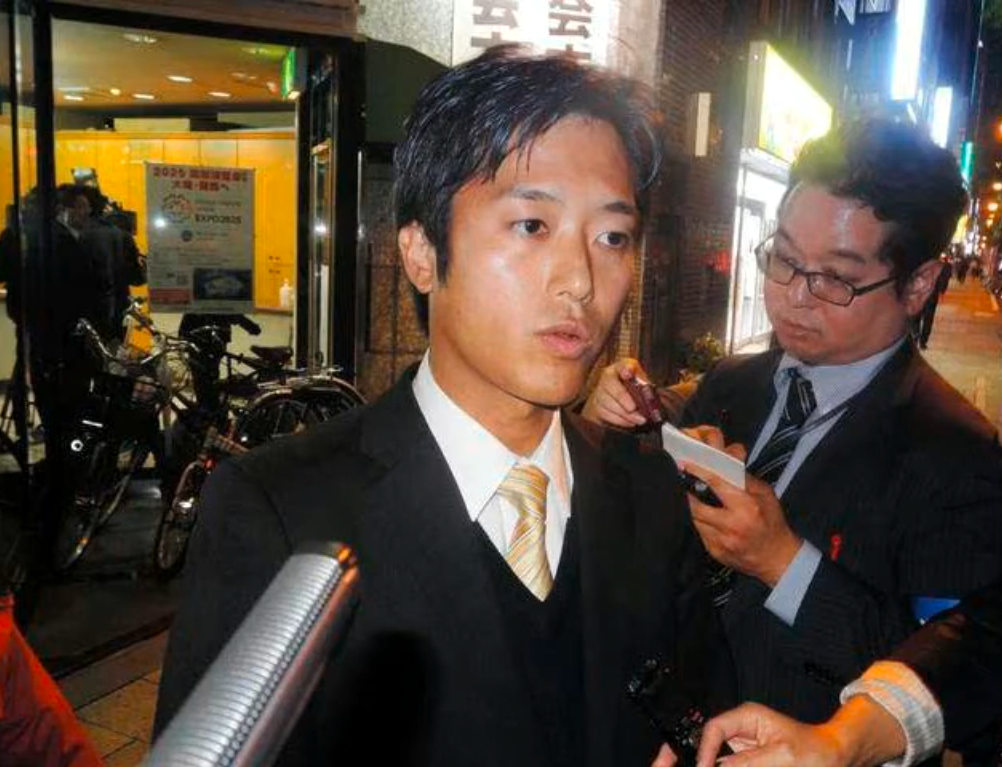
- Maruyama in 2017

Deputy Leader of The Party to Protect the People from NHK
- Incumbent
- Assumed office 1 August 2019
- Preceded by: Position established

Member of the House of Representatives for Osaka 19th district
- In office 18 December 2012 – 14 October 2021
- Preceded by: Takashi Nagayasu
- Succeeded by: Nobuhisa Itō

Personal details
- Born: 10 January 1984 (age 42) Sakai, Osaka, Japan
- Party: N-Koku (since 2019)
- Other political affiliations: JRP (2012–2014); JIP 2014 (2014–2016); JIP 2016 (2016–2019)
- Education: University of Tokyo (BEc)
- Occupation: Civil servant, Politician

Hodaka Maruyama (丸山 穂高, Maruyama Hodaka; born on January 10, 1984) is a Japanese political activist who was elected to the House of Representatives in 2012 as a member of Nippon Ishin no Kai. He was forced out of the party in 2019 after making remarks suggesting the need for Japan to wage war with Russia, and joined The Party to Protect the People from NHK.

== Career ==
Maruyama was born in Sakai, Osaka in 1984. He obtained a Bachelor of Economics from the University of Tokyo in 2006.

After graduating from University, he entered the Ministry of Economy, Trade and Industry of Japan. In 2009, he joined the Matsushita Institute of Government and Management. In 2012, he was elected to the House of Representatives as a member of the Japan Restoration Party for Osaka 19th district. He was re-elected in 2014 as a member of the Japan Innovation Party, the successor to the JRP. He was appointed vice-chairman of the Policy Research Council and was a member of the Diet Affairs Committee for his party. He was re-elected for a third term in 2017, this time as a member of Nippon Ishin no Kai.

In 2019, during a visit to Russia's Kunashir Island, he was reported to have been drunk and shouted "Do you think there is any way other than war?" to the residents, quoting the Kuril Islands dispute. This has resulted in extended criticism by the Japanese media and led to him being expelled from the party. A unanimous censure decision against him was approved by the House of Representatives. He was also kicked out of Nippon Ishin no Kai, and joined The Party to Protect the People from NHK, and is currently its deputy leader.

== Policies and propositions ==
- He opposes the introduction of the selective husband and wife system.
- He supports revising the Constitution of Japan.
- He agreed to review the Statutory interpretation of the Cabinet Legislation Bureau, which prohibits the exercise of collective defence.
- He said that Japan's nuclear arms should be examined according to the future geopolitical situation.
- He opposes the establishment of a female emperor.
- He supports the Trans-Pacific Partnership (TPP) agreement.
