= Satoshi Hamada =

Japanese politician

- 浜田 聡
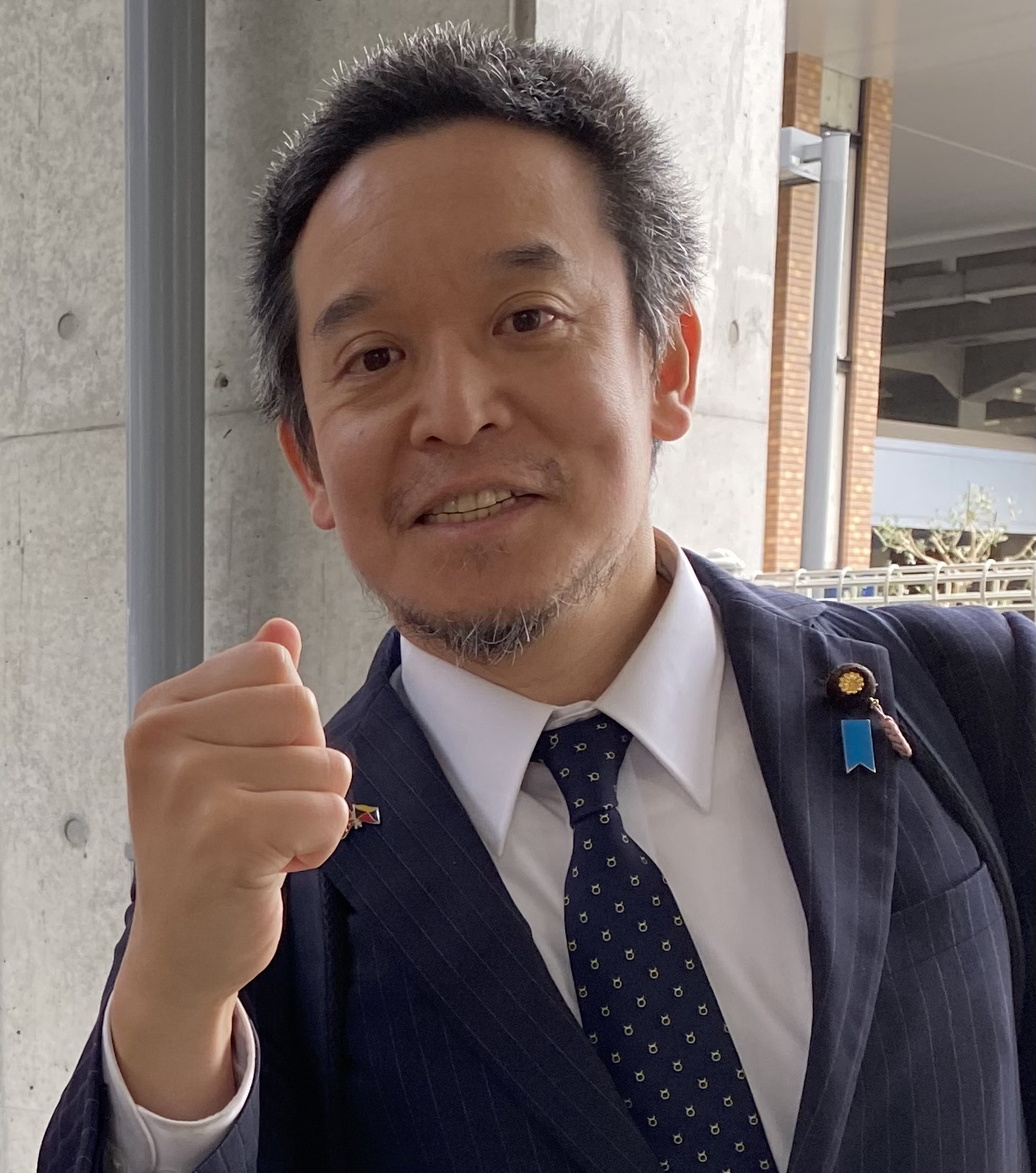
- Hamada in 2024

Member of the House of Councillors
- In office 23 October 2019 – 28 July 2025
- Preceded by: Takashi Tachibana
- Parliamentary group: The Party to Protect the People from NHK (since 2023)
- Constituency: National PR

Personal details
- Born: 11 May 1977 (age 49) Kyoto, Japan
- Party: Independent (since 2023)
- Other political affiliations: NHK Party (before 2023)
- Education: University of Tokyo (BEd); Kyoto University (MD)
- Occupation: Doctor

Satoshi Hamada (浜田 聡, Hamada Satoshi; born 11 May 1977 in Kyoto, Kyoto Prefecture) is a Japanese politician and radiologist. He served as a member of the House of Councillors from 2019 until his loss in 2025.

== Early life and education ==
Satoshi Hamada was born in Kyoto, Japan. After graduating from Rakunan High School (洛南高等学校), one of the most prestigious high schools in Kansai, he entered the University of Tokyo and got Bachelor of Education (教育学士). He initially pursued graduate study in education at the University of Tokyo and got Master of Education (教育修士), but he switched to medicine and got MD (医学士) from Kyoto University.

== Political career ==
His interest in the party's activities was sparked by Takashi Tachibana's political broadcast during the 2016 Tokyo gubernatorial election.

He ran unsuccessfully in the 2019 election for the Okayama Prefectural Assembly from the Kurashiki City and Tsukubo County constituencies as an official candidate of The Party to Protect the People from NHK. In the 25th ordinary election for the House of Councillors held in the same year, he ran as a candidate for the proportional district, but was unsuccessful. He later ran for governor of Saitama Prefecture and mayor of Higashi-Osaka City, but was unsuccessful.

On 10 October 2019, he was elected to the House of Councillors after party leader Takashi Tachibana automatically lost his seat in the House of Councillors due to filing his candidacy for the Saitama Prefecture Supplementary Election.

== Personal life ==
Hamada enjoys jogging, strength training, reading and watching football. He is a fan of Fasiano Okayama FC.
