= Collaborative Party =

Political party in Japan

Collaborative Party / NHK Party みんなでつくる党 Minna de tsukuru tō NHKから国民を守る党 NHK kara kokumin o mamoru tō
- Leader: Ayaka Otsu
- Secretary-General: Ryota Akedo, Natsuki Matsumoto
- Founder: Takashi Tachibana
- Founded: 17 June 2013
- Headquarters: 16-005 Kandanishiki-machi, Chiyoda, Tokyo 101-0054, Japan
- Ideology: Right-wing populism Direct democracy Anti-communism; Single issue politics: Anti–TV license fees
- Political position: Right-wing
- Slogan: "共に築く、多彩な未来へ" "Tomoni kizuku, tasaina mirai e" ("Build together, towards a colorful future")
- Councillors: 0 / 248
- Representatives: 0 / 465
- Prefectural assembly members: 0 / 2,644
- Municipal assembly members: 0 / 29,135

Website
- www.mintsuku.org

The Collaborative Party (Japanese: みんなでつくる党, Minna de tsukuru tō, lit. 'A party created by everyone'), abbreviated as Mintsuku (みんつく) and commonly referred to by its former name NHK Party (NHK党), is a populist and right-wing political party in Japan founded in 2013 by activist Takashi Tachibana, who led the party until stepping down in March 2023, then disputing leadership a month later, in April 2023. The party's original goal was to oppose the license fees for the national broadcasting organization NHK, revising the 1950 Broadcasting Law to scramble NHK's broadcast signal, which would mean that only those who watch NHK pay for it. The party's policies have since expanded to cover other issues, including lower taxes, increasing military defense capability, and reaching energy independence through nuclear energy.

The party has been referred to by some commentators and political scientists as a fringe or joke party, despite having seen occasional success in national elections. Its candidates and officeholders, who are often YouTubers or other Internet celebrities, have been frequent sources of controversy. The party changed its name several times, with its most recent change in November 2023.

Between 2023 and 2024, the party was embroiled in a leadership dispute between Tachibana and Ayaka Otsu. As of April 2024, the Ministry of Internal Affairs and Communications recognizes Otsu as the sole leader of the party. Despite this, most of the party initially defected and switched allegiance to Tachibana, resulting in a deadlock where Otsu was the de jure leader while Tachibana was the de facto leader. The party's status as a national political party was revoked in January 2024 after the party lost all of its seats in the National Diet after the Otsu wing leadership expelled both members of the House of Councillors, Satoshi Hamada and Kenichiro Saito, for aligning with Tachibana. However, the two still referred to themselves as members of the party through the parliamentary group with the same name as the party. Bankruptcy proceedings commenced on the party on 14 March 2024. The parliamentary group ceased to exist after Hamada lost his seat in the 2025 Japanese House of Councillors election and Saito left it in November 2025.

== History ==
Old party logo as the NHK Party, also the current logo under the Tachibana faction

=== As the NHK Party ===
The founder of the party, Takashi Tachibana, is a former employee of Japan's national public broadcasting organization NHK. He resigned from his position in the accounting department at NHK after having leaked internal corruption to weekly magazine Shūkan Bunshun in 2005. In 2012, he founded the "Tachibana one-man broadcasting station", a YouTube channel that vowed to fight against NHK. In 2013, this evolved into The Party to Protect the People from NHK. Tachibana used YouTube to bypass the mass media, which would not cover his activism. Over the years, he used YouTube to gain multiple local council seats. In 2019, the party won its first seat in the National Diet in the 2019 House of Councillors election. The party also gained a seat in the House of Representatives when Hodaka Maruyama joined the party on 29 July 2019.

The party mainly exists to counter alleged bad behaviour by NHK license fee money collectors, who Tachibana claims have connections to the yakuza. The party issues a special sticker that would allegedly protect citizen's properties and residences from these collectors and has a call center to assist people in avoiding paying the license fee. While it is required by law to make a contract with NHK and pay if one owns a device capable of receiving the NHK signal (for example, a regular TV), the law does not impose any punishment for nonpayment of the license fee. Lacking a means of criminal prosecution, Tachibana claims that NHK has resorted to using debt collectors to pressure people for payment.

The rise of the party is described as part of rising distrust of the mass media in Japan by researcher Max Guerrera-Sapone.

=== As Seijika Joshi 48 Party and leadership dispute ===
Old party logo as Seijika Joshi 48 Party

YouTuber Yoshikazu Higashitani, known as his YouTube alias GaaSyy, was elected in the 2022 House of Councillors election, expanding the party's seats in the upper house to two. Higashitani was expelled eight months later in March 2023 for not attending any sessions, reputedly due to his fear of being arrested on grounds of alleged fraud and defamation against celebrities if he were to visit Japan, as he was residing in the United Arab Emirates for the entirety of his term. Due to this, Tachibana resigned as the party's leader at a press conference, where he announced former child actress Ayaka Otsu as his successor, and the rebranding of the party to Seijika Joshi 48 tō (政治家女子48党, Politician Girls 48 Party).

A month later on 7 April 2023, Tachibana held a press conference and announced that Otsu had been expelled from the party on the previous day, stating that Otsu "posed a risk of dissolving the party." Tachibana then announced that he would return to the position of party leader. In response, Otsu held her own press conference, denying her resignation which split the party between the Otsu wing and the Tachibana wing.

=== As The Collaborative Party ===
On 6 November 2023, Otsu held a press conference and announced the change of the party's name to "The Collaborative Party" (みんなでつくる党).

The party's status as a national political party was revoked in January 2024 after the party lost all of its seats in the National Diet after Otsu expelled both members of the House of Councillors, Satoshi Hamada and Kenichiro Saito, for aligning with Tachibana. Bankruptcy proceedings commenced on the party on 14 March 2024.

The parliamentary group ceased in November 2025 after Satoshi Hamada lost his seat in the 2025 Japanese House of Councillors election and Saito left the group. In the same month, Tachibana was arrested and indicted on charges of defaming Hyōgo Prefectural Assembly member Hideaki Takeuchi during the 2024 Hyogo gubernatorial election.

== Party name history ==
The party was formed as the NHK License Fee Non-Payment Party (NHK受信料不払い党, NHK jushinryō fubarai tō) on 17 June 2013, but changed its name a month later on 23 July 2013 to The Party to Protect the People from NHK (NHKから国民を守る党, NHK kara kokumin o mamoru tō), commonly shortened to N-Koku Party (N国党) or just N-Koku.

Its name was again changed in January 2021 to The Party to Protect our People from NHK (NHKから自国民を守る党, NHK kara jikokumin o mamoru tō), officially abbreviated to NHK Party (NHK党). This change, the addition of the character 自 (ji, our) before 国民 (kokumin, people/citizen) did not alter the meaning of the party's name, but was intended to allow the party to use the official abbreviation Jimintō (自民党), that of the ruling Liberal Democratic Party. This was rejected by the Internal Affairs Ministry, however, and so the abbreviation was instead changed to "NHK Party". The party's official website used the English name "The Party to Protect Citizens from NHK", but the English-speaking press has preferred the translation "The Party to Protect the People from NHK".

The party again changed its name to The Party that Teaches How to Not Pay the NHK License Fee (NHK受信料を支払わない方法を教える党, NHK jushinryō o shiharawanai hōhō o oshieru tō) on 5 February 2021, and announced that it intended to keep changing its name in future, while maintaining the "NHK Party" short form as the party's common name.

On 25 April 2022, the party again changed its name to NHK Party (NHK党), with its self-abbreviation being "NHK".

On 8 March 2023, it was announced that the party would rebrand as Seijika Joshi 48 Party (政治家女子48党). In the ensuing leadership dispute between Tachibana and Otsu, the Tachibana wing attempted to change the party's name to The Party to Protect the People from NHK (NHKから国民を守る党), but was rejected by the Ministry of Internal Affairs and Communications (MIC). On 6 November 2023, the Otsu-wing announced the rebranding of the party to The Collaborative Party (みんなでつくる党). The changed was approved by the MIC.

Name	Period		Duration
Name	Start	End	Duration
NHK受信料不払い党; NHK License Fee Nonpayment Party	2013-06-17	2013-07-23	36 days
NHKから国民を守る党; The Party to Protect the People from NHK	2013-07-23	2020-12-21	7 years, 151 days
NHKから自国民を守る党; The Party to Protect our People from NHK	2020-12-21	2021-02-05	46 days
NHK受信料を支払わない方法を教える党; The Party That Teaches How to Not Pay the NHK License Fee	2021-02-05	2021-05-17	101 days
古い政党から国民を守る党; The Party to Protect People from Old Political Parties	2021-05-17	2021-06-28	42 days
嵐の党; Storm Party	2021-06-28	2021-07-21	23 days
NHKと裁判してる党弁護士法72条違反で; The party fighting against NHK in the trial for violating Article 72 of the Attorney Act	2021-07-21	2022-01-20	183 days
NHK受信料を支払わない国民を守る党; The party that protects those who do not pay the NHK license fee	2022-01-20	2022-04-25	95 days
NHK党; NHK Party	2022-04-25	2023-03-08	317 days
政治家女子48党; Politician Girls 48 Party	2023-03-08	2023-11-06	243 days
みんなでつくる党; The Collaborative Party	2023-11-06	present	2 years, 332 days

== Leadership ==
=== Otsu wing ===
Position	Name
Leader	Ayaka Otsu
Secretary-General	Ryota Akedo
Secretary-General	Natsuki Matsumoto
Auditor	Naoki Miyagawa

=== Tachibana wing ===
Position	Name
Leader	Takashi Tachibana
Deputy leader	Hodaka Maruyama
Secretary-General	Satoshi Hamada

=== List of leaders ===
No.	Name (Birth–death)	Constituency / title	Term of office		Election results	Image	Prime Minister (term)
No.	Name (Birth–death)	Constituency / title	Took office	Left office	Election results	Image	Prime Minister (term)
1	Takashi Tachibana (b. 1967)	Councillor for Proportional (2019)	17 June 2013	8 March 2023	N/A		S. Abe (2012–2020)
1	Takashi Tachibana (b. 1967)	Councillor for Proportional (2019)	17 June 2013	8 March 2023	N/A		Suga (2020–2021)
1	Takashi Tachibana (b. 1967)	Councillor for Proportional (2019)	17 June 2013	8 March 2023	N/A		Kishida (2021–2024)
2	Ayaka Otsu (b. 1992)	N/A	8 March 2023	Incumbent	N/A		Kishida (2021–2024)
2	Ayaka Otsu (b. 1992)	N/A	8 March 2023	Incumbent	N/A		Ishiba (2024–2025)
2	Ayaka Otsu (b. 1992)	N/A	8 March 2023	Incumbent	N/A		Takaichi (2025–)

== Election results ==
=== House of Representatives ===
House of Representatives
Election	Leader	No. of candidates	Seats			Position	Constituency votes		PR Block votes		Status
Election	Leader	No. of candidates	No.	±	Share	Position	Number	%	Number	%	Status
2021	Takashi Tachibana	30	0 / 465		0%		150,542	0.26%	796,788	1.39%	Extra-parliamentary
2024	Ayaka Otsu	6	0 / 465		0%		29,275	0.05%	23,784	0.04%	Extra-parliamentary

=== House of Councillors ===
House of Councillors
Election	Leader	Seats				Position	Constituency		Party list		Status
Election	Leader	Won	±	Share	Total (Note: The Upper house is split in two classes, one elected every three years.)	Position	Number	%	Number	%	Status
2019	Takashi Tachibana	1 / 124		0.8%	1 / 245	9th	1,521,344	3.02%	987,885	1.97%	Opposition
2022	Takashi Tachibana	1 / 125		0.8%	2 / 248	▲8th	1,106,508	2.08%	1,253,872	2.36%	Opposition
2025	Disputed leadership	0 / 125	▼1	0%	1 / 248	▼12th	740,740	1.25%	682,626	1.15%	Opposition

=== Gubernatorial ===
==== Tokyo ====
Election	Candidate	Result		
Election	Candidate	Result	Votes	%
2016	Takashi Tachibana	Lost	27,242	0.42
2020	Takashi Tachibana	Lost	43,912	0.72
2024	Various (Note: The NHK party nominated 24 candidates in the 2024 Tokyo Gubernatorial election.)	Lost	11,697	0.11
