= Poetry Kanto =

Bilingual Japanese poetry magazine

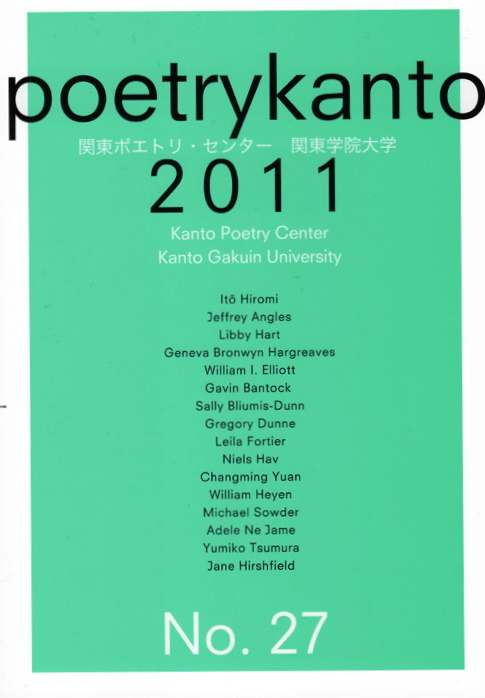
- Poetry Kanto, 2011
- Editor: Alan Botsford
- Categories: poetry, culture, literature, Japan
- Frequency: Annual
- Publisher: Kanto Poetry Center, Kanto Gakuin University
- First issue: 1968
- Company: Kanto Poetry Center
- Country: Japan
- Based in: Yokohama
- Language: English, Japanese

Poetry Kanto (ポエトリ関東) is a Japan-based, English and Japanese bilingual poetry print journal founded and originally edited by award-winning translator William I. Elliott and internationally acclaimed poet Shuntarō Tanikawa. The annual journal, currently edited by Alan Botsford, is published by the Kanto Poetry Center at Kanto Gakuin University in Yokohama, Japan and showcases modern and contemporary Japanese poetry in English translation, as well as contemporary English-language poetry from the United States, the United Kingdom, New Zealand, Australia, Wales, South Africa, Hong Kong, Canada, Ireland, and other countries. Bridging East and West, Poetry Kanto features "outstanding poetry that navigates the divide of ocean and language from around the world."

== Goals ==
Poetry Kanto devotes itself to introducing Japanese poets and English-speaking poets to a wide audience at home in Japan and abroad. It aims to promote dialogue between Japan and the English-speaking world. Each issue features an in-depth look at poets from both sides of the cultural divide, setting up a blend of cultures and traditions unique among literary publications. The hope is for readers to step outside their limited cultural spheres and engage in cross-cultural dialogue for a rebirth at the crossroads of culture and imagination.

In a recent interview, editor Alan Botsford said, "I feel very fortunate… to play a role in a cross-cultural mission as wall as literary exploration. I think cultural identity and that struggle, for many people across the globe, the struggle of cultural identity per se and also between cultures, speaks to what Poetry Kanto tries to offer. As editor, I envision Poetry Kanto as a transformative space where poetry’s insights are made available for, and can engage the entire range of, cultures, not just getting into the cultural mix but adding to it, enriching it, fermenting it beyond our ideas of Japaneseness and Americanness."

== History ==
The journal's origins can be traced back to the founding of the Kanto Poetry Center in 1968 by Professor Emeritus William I. Elliott, when he proposed a four-fold center to be housed at Kanto Gakuin University—the first of its kind and scope in Japan, to include a library of contemporary poetry, a poetry journal, regular poetry readings in the university, and an annual poetry conference. The Center, modeled after American counterparts, was originally directed by Kanto Gakuin's Prof. Naoyuki Yagyū and his colleagues, Kazuo Kawamura and William I. Elliott, and has over the years sought, in Elliott's words, "to promote the health of poetry both as an art and a discipline within university structures." The Center has carried on by the cooperation and funding of successive university presidents, from 1968 to the present.

The Center has held poetry readings with many readers, including Shuntarō Tanikawa, Naoko Kudo, Masayo Koike, Arthur Binard, and Kisako Ryō. It also successfully launched the bilingual journal Poetry Kanto, and continued holding its annual conference until 2005, when the founding editors retired. Over the years, the Center's annual conference, or Summer Institute Program, featured among the non-Japanese poet-readers-lecturers and seminar teachers James Kirkup, Gary Snyder, Harry Guest, William Stafford, Denise Levertov, W.S. Merwin, Seamus Heaney, Les Murray and Jon Silkin, with the preponderance of the logistics of the conference carried out by Kazuo Kawamura.

Poetry Kanto was first published in 1968 to present to the participants of the Kanto Poetry Summer Institute Program. The second issue appeared in 1970, after which a dozen-year hiatus followed. The journal resumed publication again in 1984 and has been in continuous publication ever since, with Elliott and Tanikawa at the English and Japanese editorial helms, respectively. As of 2005, issue number 21, the "baton" was passed to co-editors Alan Botsford and Nishihara Katsumasa with an advisory board consisting of Shuntarō Tanikawa, Kazuo Kawamura and William I. Elliott, but in 2011, issue number 27, Botsford became sole editor.

In 2005 the look of Poetry Kanto changed, with the professional designer/publisher's services shifting from Tokyo to Kamakura, the headquarters of the small but growing literary publisher Minato-no-hito (literally "a guy at the harbor", taken from the title of Tarō Kitamura’s poem).

== Featured Poets ==
Since 2005, Poetry Kanto has featured a wide and diverse range of poets such as Gwyneth Lewis, Ilya Kaminsky, Beth Ann Fennelly, Vijay Seshadri, Harryette Mullen, Ellen Bass, Rigoberto González, Ayukawa Nobuo, Tarō Kitamura, Akira Tatehata, Shuntarō Tanikawa, Gregory Orr, Michael Sowder, Ann-Fisher Wirth, Sarah Arvio, Michele Leggott, Saburō Kuroda, Rin Ishigaki, Kiyoko Nagase, Toriko Takarabe, Inuo Taguchi, Hiroshi Kawasaki, Mari L’Esperance, Ekiawah Adler-Belendez, William Heyen, Linda Ann Strang, J.P. Dancing Bear, Yasuhiro Yotsumoto, Kiriu Minashita, Chimako Tada, Masayo Koike, Naoko Kudō, Ryūichi Tamura, Kenji Miyazawa, Maiko Sugimoto, Junzaburō Nishwaki, Irene McKinney, Jane Hirshfield, Shinjirō Kurahara, Ryō Kisaka, Alicia Ostriker, Judy Halebsky, Hiromi Itō, Jeffrey Angles, Takako Arai, Libby Hart, Gregory Dunne, Niels Hav, William Heyen, and Adele Ne Jame.

In addition, the work of translators such as Jeffrey Angles, Hiroaki Sato, William I. Elliott & Kazuo Kawamura, Katsumasa Nishihara, Oketani Shogo & Leza Lowitz, Marianne Tarcov, Mitsuko Ohno & Beverly Curran, Leith Morton, Takako Lento, Hidetoshi Tomiyama & Michael Pronko, Arthur Binard & Ryō Kisaka, Hosea Hirata, and Ayako Takahashi have in recent years been featured in the pages of Poetry Kanto.

== Submissions ==
Submissions to Poetry Kanto—poems written in English or Japanese poems in English translation—are accepted from December through May. The journal contains 50 poems or 130 pages per issue and seeks exciting, well-crafted contemporary poetry in English, and also encourages and publishes high-quality English translations of modern and emerging Japanese poets. All translations must be accompanied by the original poems.
