= Tetsuzō =

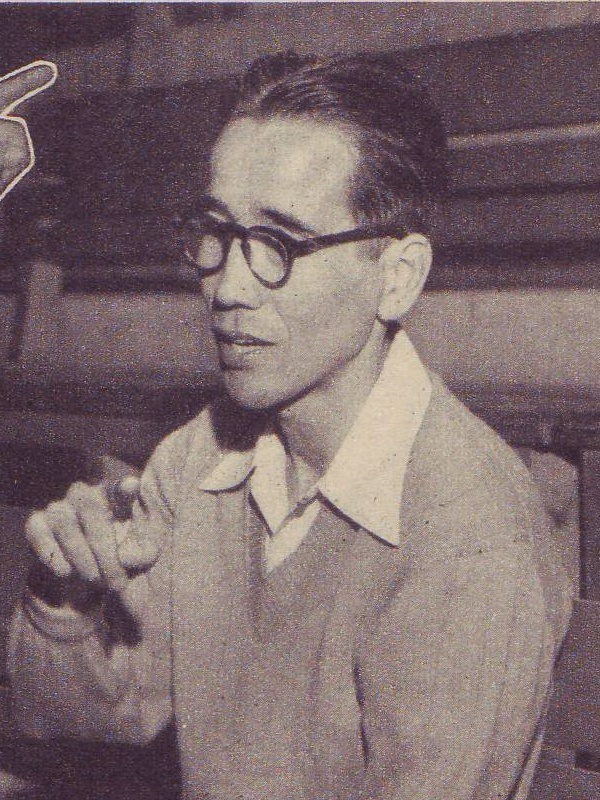
- Tetsuzo Shirai (1900–1983), Japanese Theatre director
- Pronunciation: tetsɯdzoɯ (IPA)
- Gender: Male

Origin
- Origin: Japanese
- Meaning: Different meanings depending on the kanji used

Other names
- Alternative spelling: Tetuzo (Kunrei-shiki) Tetuzo (Nihon-shiki) Tetsuzō, Tetsuzo, Tetsuzou, Tetsuzoh (Hepburn)

Tetsuzō is a masculine Japanese given name.

== Written forms ==
Tetsuzō can be written using different combinations of kanji characters. Some examples:

- 鉄三, "iron, three"
- 鉄蔵, "iron, store up"
- 鉄造, "iron, create"
- 哲三, "philosophy, three"
- 哲蔵, "philosophy, store up"
- 哲造, "philosophy, create"
- 徹三, "penetrate, three"

The name can also be written in hiragana てつぞう or katakana テツゾウ.

== Notable people with the name ==
- Tetsuzo Fuwa (不破 哲三; 1930–2025), Japanese communist politician
- Tetsuzo Fuyushiba (冬柴 鉄三) (1936–2011), Japanese politician
- Tetsuzo Iwamoto (岩本 徹三) (1916–1955), Japanese World War II flying ace
- Tetsuzo Shirai (白井 鐵造; 1900–1983), Japanese theatre director
- Tetsuzo Tanikawa (谷川 徹三) (1895–1989), Japanese philosopher
