= Mutsuo Takahashi =

Japanese writer

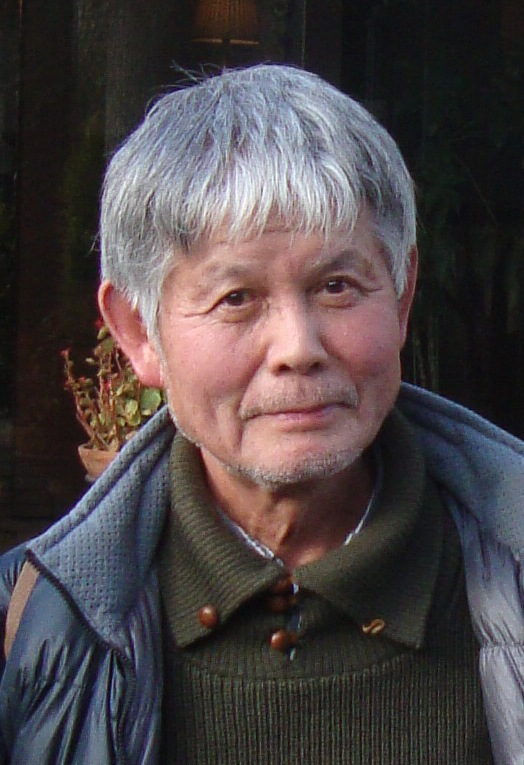
- Takahashi in 2009
- Born: December 15, 1937 (age 88); Fukuoka Prefecture, Japan
- Occupations: Poet, essayist
- Writing career
- Period: Contemporary
- Genres: Poetry, novel

Mutsuo Takahashi (高橋 睦郎, Takahashi Mutsuo; born December 15, 1937) is one of the most prominent and prolific poets, essayists, and writers of contemporary Japan, with more than three dozen collections of poetry, several works of prose, dozens of books of essays, and several major literary prizes to his name. He is well known for his open writing about male homoeroticism. He currently lives in the seaside town of Zushi, several kilometers south of Yokohama, Japan.

== Early life ==
Born in 1937 in the rural southern island of Kyushu, Takahashi spent his early years living in the countryside of Japan. As Takahashi describes in his memoirs Twelve Views from the Distance (十二の遠景, Jū-ni no enkei) published in 1970, his father, a factory worker in a metal plant, died of pneumonia when Takahashi was one hundred and five days old, leaving his mother to fend for herself in the world. Taking advantage of the opportunities presented by the expanding Japanese empire, she left Takahashi and his sisters with their grandparents in the rural town of Nōgata and went to Tientsin in mainland China to be with a lover.

Due to his grandparents' poverty, Takahashi spent much time with extended family and other neighbors. Especially important to him during this time was an uncle that served a pivotal figure in Takahashi's development, serving as a masculine role model. The uncle, whom Takahashi later described in many early poems, was sent to the Burma Campaign, where he died of illness.

After Takahashi's mother returned from the mainland, they went to live in the port of Moji, just as the air raids by the Allied powers intensified. Takahashi's memoirs describe that although he hated the war, World War II provided a chaotic and frightening circus for his classmates, who would gawk at the wreckage of crashed B-29s and watch ships blow up at sea, destroyed by naval mines. When the war came to an end, he felt a great sense of relief.

In his memoirs and interviews, Takahashi has mentioned that in the time he spent with his schoolmates, he became increasingly aware of his own sexual attraction towards men. This became a common subject in the first book of poetry he published in 1959.

== Early writing ==
After a bout of tuberculosis, Takahashi graduated from the Fukuoka University of Education, and in 1962 moved to Tokyo. For many years, he worked at an advertising company, but in the meantime, he wrote a good deal of poetry. His first book to receive national attention was Rose Tree, Fake Lovers (薔薇の木･にせの恋人たち, Bara no ki, nise no koibito-tachi), an anthology published in 1964 that describes male-male erotic love in bold and direct language. A laudatory review from the critic Jun Etō appeared in the daily newspaper Asahi shimbun with Takahashi's photograph—an unusual instance of a poet's photograph included in the paper's survey of literature.

About the same time, Takahashi sent the collection to the novelist Yukio Mishima who contacted him and offered to use his name to help promote Takahashi's work. The two shared a close relationship and friendship that lasted until Mishima's suicide in 1970. Other close friends Takahashi made about this time include Tatsuhiko Shibusawa who translated the Marquis de Sade into Japanese, the surreal poet Chimako Tada who shared Takahashi's interest in classical Greece, the poet Shigeo Washisu who was also interested in the classics and the existential ramifications of homoeroticism. With the latter two writers, Takahashi cooperated to create the literary journal The Symposium (饗宴, Kyōen) named after Plato's famous dialogue. This interest in eroticism and existentialism reflects a larger existential trend in the literature and culture of Japan during the 1960s and 1970s.

Homoeroticism remained an important theme in his poetry written in free verse through the 1970s, including the long poem Ode (頌, Homeuta), which the publisher Winston Leyland has called "the great gay poem of the 20th century." Many of these early works have been translated into English by Hiroaki Sato and reprinted in the collection Partings at Dawn: An Anthology of Japanese Gay Literature.

About the same time, Takahashi started writing prose. In 1970, he published Twelve Views from the Distance about his early life and the novella The Sacred Promontory (聖なる岬, Sei naru misaki) about his own erotic awakening. In 1972, he wrote A Legend of a Holy Place (聖所伝説, Seisho densetsu), a surrealistic novella inspired by his own experiences on a forty-day trip to New York City during which Donald Richie led him through the gay spots of the city. In 1974, he released Zen's Pilgrimage of Virtue (善の遍歴, Zen no henreki), a homoerotic and often extremely humorous reworking of a legend of Sudhana found in the Buddhist classic Avatamsaka Sutra. In 1975, Chicago Review Press published Poems of a Penisist (translated by Hiroaki Sato).

== Later literary career ==
Around 1975, Takahashi's writing began to explore a wider range of themes, such as the destiny of mankind, Takahashi's travels to many nations around the world, and relationships in the modern world. It was with this broadening of themes that Takahashi's poetry began to earn an increasingly broad audience.

As with his early writing, Takahashi's later writing shows a high degree of erudition, including a thorough awareness of the history of world literature and art. In fact, many of his collections published from the 1980s onward, include poems either dedicated to or about important authors around the world, including Jorge Luis Borges, Jean Genet, Ezra Pound, and Chimako Tada,—each a homage to an important literary predecessor. For instance, in 2010, Takahashi has also produced a slim book of poems to accompany a 2010 exhibition of the work of the American artist Joseph Cornell.

Although Takahashi has been most visibly active in the realm of free verse poetry, he has also written traditional Japanese verse (both tanka and haiku poetry), novels, Nō and Kyōgen plays, reworkings of ancient Greek dramas and epic poetry, many works of literary criticism, and a libretto for an opera by the contemporary Japanese composer Akira Miyoshi.

Since the broadening of Takahashi's themes in the 1970s and his retirement from the advertising agency in the 1980s, the pace of his publication has increased. He has been the recipient of a number of important literary prizes in Japan, such as the Rekitei Prize, the Yomiuri Literary Prize, the Takami Jun Prize, the Modern Poetry Hanatsubaki Prize, and the Shika Bungakukan Prize, and in 2000, he earned the prestigious Kunshō award for his contributions to modern Japanese literature.

Takahashi presently lives in the seaside city of Zushi, ten kilometers from Yokohama. His poems have been translated into languages as diverse as Chinese, Norwegian, Spanish, and Afrikaans. He frequently gives readings and lectures around the world.

In 2024, he received the Order of Culture, a highly prestigious award bestowed to artists by the Japanese government. In 2026, he was selected for the America Award in Literature, given each year to celebrate the lifetime achievements of an internationally recognized writer.

== See also ==
- Gay literature

== Bibliography ==
Translations into English

- Takahashi, Mutsuo (1975, republished 2012), Poems of a Penisist, trans. Hiroaki Sato, Chicago: Chicago Review Press. ISBN 978-0-914090-08-3. Minneapolis: University of Minnesota Press. ISBN 978-0-816679-72-0.
- Takahashi, Mutsuo (1984), A Bunch of Keys: Selected Poems, trans. Hiroaki Sato, Trumansburg, NY: Crossing Press. ISBN 978-0-89594-144-2.
- Takahashi Mutsuo (1996), Selections, trans. Stephen D. Miller, Hiroaki Sato, and Steven Karpa, Partings at Dawn: An Anthology of Japanese Gay Literature, ed. Stephen D. Miller, San Francisco: Gay Sunshine Press, pp. 207–95. ISBN 978-0-940567-18-4.
- Takahashi, Mutsuo (1992), Sleeping, Sinning, Falling, trans. Hiroaki Sato, San Francisco: City Lights Books, 1992. ISBN 978-0-87286-268-5.
- Takahashi Mutsuo (1999),"Zen's Pilgrimage: Conclusion," trans. Jeffrey Angles, Queer Dharma: Voices of Gay Buddhists, vol. 2, ed. Winston Leyland, San Francisco: Gay Sunshine Press, pp. 198–222. ISBN 978-0-940567-22-1.
- Takahashi Mutsuo (2000), "Zen's Pilgrimage: Introduction," trans. Jeffrey Angles, Harrington Gay Men's Fiction Quarterly, vol. 2, no. 3: 53-76. ISSN 1522-3140.
- Takahashi Mutsuo (2006), "The Snow of Memory" [Excerpt from Twelve Views from the Distance], trans. Jeffrey Angles, Japan: A Traveler's Literary Companion, Berkeley: Whereabouts Press, pp. 190–203.
- Takahashi, Mutsuo (2006), On Two Shores: New and Selected Poems, trans. Mitsuko Ohno and Frank Sewell, Dublin: Dedalus Press. ISBN 978-1-904556-49-7.
- Takahashi, Mutsuo (2006), We of Zipangu: Selected Poems, trans. James Kirkup and Tamaki Makoto, Todmorden, UK: Arc Publications. ISBN 978-1-904614-04-3.
- Takahashi Mutsuo (2006), Five Poems, trans. Jeffrey Angles, Intersections: Gender, History, and Culture in the Asian Context .
- Takahashi Mutsuo (2012), Twelve Views from the Distance, trans. Jeffrey Angles. Minneapolis: University of Minnesota Press. ISBN 978-0-816679-36-2.
- Takahashi Mutsuo (2022), Sacred Headland, trans. Paul McCarthy, Queer Subjects in Modern Japanese Literature: Male Love, Intimacy, and Erotics, 1886-2014, Ann Arbor, MI: University of Michigan Press. ISBN 978-0-472-05567-8.
- Takahashi Mutsuo (2023), Only Yesterday, trans. Jeffrey Angles. Marfa, TX: Canarium Books. ISBN 978-1-734481-65-5.

Secondary sources

- Angles, Jeffrey (2001), "Discovering and Textualizing Memory: The Tsuioku Shōsetsu of Naka Kansuke and Takahashi Mutsuo," Issues of Canonicity and Canon Formation in Japanese Literary Studies: Proceedings of the Association for Japanese Literary Studies, ed. Stephen D. Miller, West Lafayette, IN: Association for Japanese Literary Studies, pp. 389–404.
- Angles, Jeffrey (2006), "Penisism and the Eternal Hole: (Homo)Eroticism and Existential Exploration in the Early Poetry of Takahashi Mutsuo," Intersections: Gender, History, and Culture in the Asian Context .
- Angles, Jeffrey (2007), "On the Limits of Liberation: Takahashi Mutsuo's Critique of Queer America," Travel in Japanese Representational Culture: Proceedings of the Association for Japanese Literary Studies, ed. Eiji Sekine, West Lafayette, IN: Association for Japanese Literary Studies, pp. 245–54.
- Takahashi Mutsuo and Jeffrey Angles (2006), "Interview with Takahashi Mutsuo [June 9, 2005]," trans. Katsuhiko Sugunuma, Intersections: Gender, History, and Culture in the Asian Context .
