= Hiroaki Sato (translator) =

Japanese translator of poetry

Hiroaki Sato (佐藤 紘彰, Satō Hiroaki; born 1942) is a Japanese poet and prolific translator who writes frequently for The Japan Times. He has been called (by Gary Snyder) "perhaps the finest translator of contemporary Japanese poetry into American English". Sato received the Japan–U.S. Friendship Commission Prize for the Translation of Japanese Literature in 1999 for his translation of Breeze Through Bamboo by Ema Saikō (Columbia University Press, 1997) and in 2017 for The Silver Spoon: Memoir of a Boyhood in Japan by Kansuke Naka (Stone Bridge Press, 2015).

== Life ==
The son of a police officer, he was born in Taiwan in 1942. The family fled back to Japan at the end of WWII and encountered a number of hardships, including living in a stable. He was educated at Doshisha University in Kyoto, and moved to the United States in 1968. His first job was at the New York branch of the Japan External Trade Organization (JETRO), from April 1969; meanwhile he was translating art books and catalogs anonymously for Weatherhill. The first work to appear under his own name was a small collection of poems by Princess Shikishi. He attracted attention in the Japanese press with the anthology Ten Japanese Poets (1973) and his translations were soon published by the Chicago Review.

Most of Sato's translations are from Japanese into English, but he has also translated verse by John Ashbery into Japanese. He has also provided translations of primary sources on the subject of the samurai tradition in feudal Japan. In 2008, he translated Inose Naoki's biography of Yukio Mishima.

Sato was president of the Haiku Society of America from 1979 to 1981, and honorary curator of the American Haiku Archives in 2006–7. He was a professor of Japanese literature at St. Andrews Presbyterian College in North Carolina from 1985 to 1991, and then director of research and planning at JETRO New York. Since 1998 he has been an adjunct at the University of Massachusetts Amherst. He lives in New York City.

In 1982, Sato received the PEN Translation Prize.

== Selected works ==
- Shikishi. Poems of Princess Shikishi. Translated by Hiroaki Sato. Bluefish, 1973
- Sato, Hiroaki. Ten Japanese Poets. Hanover, New Hampshire: Granite, 1973. ISBN 0-914102-00-1. OCLC 1172239
- Minoru, Yoshika. Lilac Garden. Translated by Hiroaki Sato. Chicago Review, 1975
- Takahashi, Mutsuo. Poems of a Penisist. Translated by Hiroaki Sato. Chicago Review, 1975
- Miyazawa, Kenji. Spring and Asura. Translated by Hiroaki Sato. Chicago Review, 1975
- Takahashi, Mutsuo. Winter Haiku: 25 Haiku by Mutsuo Takahashi. Translated by Hiroaki Sato. Manchester, NH: First Haiku Press, 1980
- Takamura, Kōtarō. Chieko and Other Poems of Takamura Kōtarō. Translated by Hiroaki Sato. University of Hawaii, 1980
- From the Country of Eight Islands: An Anthology of Japanese Poetry. Edited and translated by Hiroaki Sato and Burton Watson. Seattle, WA: University of Washington Press, 1981. ISBN 0-295-95798-0, ISBN 0-385-14030-4. OCLC 7178991. Winner of the American PEN translation prize in 1983
- Sato, Hiroaki. One Hundred Frogs: From Renga to Haiku to English. New York, NY: Weatherhill, 1983.ISBN 0-8348-0176-0. OCLC 8806016
- Yagyu, Munenori. Sword and the Mind. Translated by Hiroaki Sato. Woodstock, N.Y.: Overlook Press, 1986
- Sato, Hiroaki. Haiku in English: A Poetic Form Expands. Tokyo, Japan: Simul Press, 1987. ISBN 4-377-50764-8. OCLC 58914192
- Sato, Hiroaki. That First Time: Six Renga on Love, and Other Poems. Laurinburg, NC: St. Andrews Press, 1988. OCLC 19632028
- Miyazawa, Kenji. Future of Ice: Poems and Stories of a Japanese Buddhist. Translated by Hiroaki Sato. Farrar, Straus and Giroux, 1989
- Ashbery, John. 波ひとつ (Nami hitotsu). Translation into Japanese by Hiroaki Sato, of A Wave. 書肆山田, 1991
- Takahashi, Mutsuo. Sleeping Sinning Falling. Translated by Hiroaki Sato. City Lights Books, 1992
- Takamura, Kotaro. A Brief History of Imbecility: Poetry and Prose of Takamura Kotaro. Translated by Hiroaki Sato. University of Hawaii, 1992
- Ozaki, Hosai. Right under the big sky, I don't wear a hat: the haiku and prose of Hosai Ozaki. Translated by Hiroaki Sato. Berkeley, CA: Stone Bridge Press, 1993
- Shikishi. String of Beads: Complete Poems of Princess Shikishi. Translated by Hiroaki Sato. University of Hawaii Press, 1993
- Sato, Hiroaki. One Hundred Frogs. New York, NY: Weatherhill, 1995. ISBN 0-8348-0335-6. OCLC 31783352. (Collects one hundred different translations of the same poem)
- Sato, Hiroaki. Legends of the Samurai. Woodstock, N.Y.: Overlook Press, 1995. ISBN 0-87951-619-4. OCLC 32430546
- Matsuo, Basho. Basho's Narrow road: spring & autumn passages. Translated from the Japanese, with annotations by Hiroaki Sato. Berkeley, CA: Stone Bridge Press, 1996
- Saikō, Ema. Breeze through Bamboo: Selected Kanshi of Ema Saiko. Translated from the Japanese by Hiroaki Sato. Columbia University Press, 1997. (Winner of the 1999 Japan‐United States Friendship Commission Japanese Literary Translation Prize)
- Mishima, Yukio. Silk and Insight. Translated from the Japanese by Hiroaki Sato. Armonk, N.Y.: M. E. Sharpe, 1998
- Hagiwara, Sakutaro. Howling at the Moon and Blue. Translated from the Japanese by Hiroaki Sato. Green Integer, 2001
- Taneda, Santoka. Grass and Tree Cairn. Translated by Hiroaki Sato. Winchester, VA: Red Moon Press, 2002
- Mishima, Yukio. My Friend Hitler: and Other Plays. Translated by Hiroaki Sato. Columbia University Press, 2002
- Yagyu, Munenori. The Sword and the Mind: The Classic Japanese Treatise on Swordsmanship and Tactics. Translated from the Japanese by Hiroaki Sato. Fall River Press, 2004.
- Sato, Hiroaki. Erotic Haiku. Yohan Shuppan, 2005
- Miyazawa, Kenji. Miyazawa Kenji: Selections. Translated from the Japanese by Hiroaki Sato. University of California, 2007
- Sato, Hiroaki. Japanese Women Poets: An Anthology. Armonk, N.Y.: M.E. Sharpe, 2007. ISBN 0-7656-1783-8, ISBN 0-7656-1784-6. OCLC 70131159
- Inose, Naoki with Hiroaki Sato. Persona: A Biography of Yukio Mishima. Stone Bridge Press, 2012
- Sato, Hiroaki. Snow in a Silver Bowl: A Quest for the World of Yugen. Red Moon Press, 2013.
- Sakutarō Hagiwara. Cat Town. Translated by Hiroaki Sato. New York Review Books, 2014.
- Kansuke Naka. The Silver Spoon: Memoir of a Boyhood in Japan. Translated by Hiroaki Sato. Stone Bridge Press. 2015 (Winner of the 2017 Japan‐United States Friendship Commission Japanese Literary Translation Prize)
- Sato, Hiroaki. On Haiku. New Directions Publishing, 2018. ISBN 978-0811227414
- Sato, Hiroaki. A Bridge of Words: Views Across America and Japan. Stone Bridge Press, 2022. ISBN 978-1611720785

== See also ==
- Michi Kobi
