= Hiromi Ito =

Hiromi Ito may refer to:

- Hiromi Itō (伊藤 比呂美) (born 1955), Japanese writer
- Hiromi Itoh (伊藤 大海) (born 1997), Japanese baseball player
