= Jeffrey Angles =

American poet

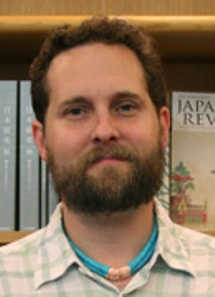
- Angles in 2009
- Born: July 10, 1971 (age 55); Columbus, Ohio, US
- Occupations: translator, poet, professor
- Awards: Yomiuri Prize for Literature (2017) (poetry)

Jeffrey Angles (Japanese: ジェフリー・アングルス, born July 10, 1971) is an American poet who writes free verse in his second language, Japanese. He is also an American scholar of modern Japanese literature and an award-winning literary translator of modern Japanese poetry and fiction into English. He is a professor of Japanese language and Japanese literature at Western Michigan University. Among his awards are the Japan–U.S. Friendship Commission Prize for the Translation of Japanese Literature in 2009 for his translation of Forest of Eyes: Selected Poems of Tada Chimako by Tada Chimako and the 2017 Yomiuri Prize for Literature in the poetry category for his own Japanese-language poetry collection Watashi no hizukehenkosen ("My International Date Line").

== Biography ==
Angles was born in Columbus, Ohio on July 10, 1971. When he was fifteen, he traveled to Japan for the first time as a high school exchange student, staying in the small, southwestern Japanese city of Shimonoseki in Yamaguchi Prefecture, which represented a turning point in his life. Since then he has spent several years living in various Japanese cities, including Saitama City, Kobe, and Kyoto.

While a graduate student in Japanese literature at Ohio State University in the mid-1990s, Angles began translating Japanese short stories and poetry, publishing in a wide variety of literary magazines in the United States, Canada, and Australia. He is particularly interested in translating poetry and modernist texts, since he feels these have been largely overlooked and understudied by academics in the West.

He is passionate about translation as a discipline, stating that "without translation, we would be locked within our own cultures, unable to access the vast, overwhelming wealth of the rest of the world's intellect. By translating literary works, we are making that world heritage available to literally millions of people." Angles has also argued that although the Japanese literary establishment is fairly balanced in the numbers of male and female authors currently being published, translation tends overwhelmingly to prioritize the translation of male authors. That led him to focus on using translation to share underrepresented voices in Japanese literature, especially those of women, gay writers, and socially engaged writers. His book-length translations include the work of novelist, ethnologist, and poet Shinobu Orikuchi, feminist poets Hiromi Itō and Takako Arai, the gay poet Mutsuo Takahashi, science fiction author Shigeru Kayama, novelist Yoko Tawada, and contemporary ecopoet Sayaka Ōsaki.

Angles earned his Ph.D. in 2004 with a dissertation about representations of male homoeroticism in the literature of Kaita Murayama and the popular writer Ranpo Edogawa. This is the basis for his book Writing the Love of Boys published in 2011 by University of Minnesota Press, which also includes new research on Taruho Inagaki and Jun'ichi Iwata. In this book, he shows that segments of early twentieth-century Japanese society were influenced by Western psychology to believe that homosexuality was a pathological aberration. These views, however, were countered by a number of writers who argued precisely the opposite: that it was a vital, powerful, and even beautiful experience that had a long, rich history in Japan. Angles draws upon fiction, poetry, essays, diaries, paintings and other visual material to trace the relations between these writers and the inspiration that they drew from early Western homophile writers, such as Edward Carpenter, John Addington Symonds, and Walt Whitman. In the conclusion of the book, Angles also discusses the ways that contemporary BL manga have inherited and built upon the ideas fashioned by Kaita Murayama, Ranpo Edogawa, and Taruho Inagaki several decades earlier. Angles' other research involves studies of popular Japanese culture in the 1920s and 1930s, writing about contemporary Japanese poetry, and studying the history of translation in Japan.

He has also contributed a critically acclaimed voice-over commentary to the Criterion Collection's release of Kenji Mizoguchi's 1954 film Sansho the Bailiff.

== Honors ==
In 2009, Angles received the Japan-U.S. Friendship Commission Prize for the Translation of Japanese Literature, administered by the Donald Keene Center of Japanese Culture at Columbia University for his translation of Forest of Eyes: Selected Poems of Chimako Tada by Chimako Tada. This same book also won the Harold Morton Landon Translation Award from the Academy of American Poets in 2011. His book of translations, Killing Kanoko: Selected Poems of Hiromi Itō, published in 2009 by Action Books, was a finalist in the poetry category of the Best Translated Book Award offered by Three Percent.

His translation of the wartime memoirs of the gay writer Mutsuo Takahashi, Twelve Views from the Distance, was shortlisted for a Lambda Literary Award (memoir category) in 2013. Moreover, his translation of the classic modernist novel The Book of the Dead, written in the middle of World War II by the gay novelist, poet, and ethnologist Shinobu Orikuchi attracted a significant amount of attention, winning both the Aldo and Jeanne Scaglione Prize for a Translation of a Literary Work from the Modern Language Association and the first-ever Lindsley and Masao Miyoshi Prize from the Donald Keene Center of Japanese Culture at Columbia University.

Angles has also won grants from the National Endowment for the Arts and the 2008 PEN Translation Fund Grant from PEN American Center for his translation of the memoirs of the contemporary poet Mutsuo Takahashi. In 2008, Angles was invited to the Kennedy Center in Washington DC to serve as the curator for the literary events in the Japan: Culture+Hyperculture Festival. He has also been interviewed on NPR's All Things Considered about the short story collection Japan: A Traveler's Literary Companion, which he co-edited with J. Thomas Rimer.

In 2009–2010, Angles was a visiting researcher at the International Research Center for Japanese Studies, where he organized a group research project about the history of translation practices in Japan. In 2011, he was a visiting professor in Comparative Literature at the Komaba campus of the University of Tokyo.

In 2017, Angles was awarded the Yomiuri Prize for Literature, a prize comparable to America's Pulitzer Prize, in poetry during a formal ceremony in Tokyo on Feb. 17. Angles won the prize for his book of Japanese-language poetry, Watashi no hizukehenkosen ("My International Date Line"). Angles is one of the few non-native speakers to win the award and is the first non-native ever to win for a book of poetry.

== Major publications ==
=== Translations ===
- Arai, Takako (2019), Jeffrey Angles (ed.), Factory Girls: Selected Poems of Takako Arai, translated by Jeffrey Angles; Jen Crawford; Carol Hayes; Rina Kikuchi; You Nakai; Sawako Nakayasu, Notre Dame, IN: Action Books, ISBN 9780900575846
- Fukunaga, Takehiko; Hotta, Yoshi; Nakamura, Shin'Ichiro (2026). The Luminous Fairies and Mothra, Minnesota: University of Minnesota Press, ISBN 978-1-5179-2001-2
- Itō, Hiromi (2009), Killing Kanoko: Selected Poetry of Hiromi Itō, Notre Dame, IN: Action Books, ISBN 978-0-9799755-4-7
- Itō, Hiromi (2014), Wild Grass on the Riverbank, Notre Dame, IN: Action Books, ISBN 978-0-9898048-4-4
- Hiromi Itō; Hirata Toshiko; Takako Arai (2016), Jeffrey Angles (ed.), Poems of Hiromi Itō, Toshiko Hirata & Takako Arai, Newtown, Australia: Vagabond Press, ISBN 978-1922181749
- Itō, Hiromi (2020), Killing Kanoko / Wild Grass on the Riverbank, London: Tilted Axis Books, ISBN 978-1-911284-42-0
- Itō, Hiromi (2022), The Thorn Puller, Berkeley, CA: Stone Bridge Press, ISBN 978-1-737625-30-8
- Kayama, Shigeru (2023), Godzilla and Godzilla Raids Again, Minneapolis: University of Minnesota Press, ISBN 978-1-4529-6985-5
- Ōsaki, Sayaka (2023), Noisy Animal, Newtown, NSW: Vagabond Press, ISBN 978-1-925735-48-2
- Orikuchi, Shinobu (2016), The Book of the Dead, Minneapolis: University of Minnesota Press, ISBN 978-0816688104
- Tada, Chimako (2010), Forest of Eyes: Selected Poetry of Tada Chimako, Berkeley: University of California Press, ISBN 978-0-520-26051-1
- Takahashi, Mutsuo (2010), Intimate Worlds Enclosed, Sakura: Kawamura Memorial Art Museum
- Takahashi, Mutsuo (2012), Twelve Views from the Distance, Minnesota: University of Minnesota Press, ISBN 978-0816679362
- Takahashi, Mutsuo (2019), Locus Amoenus, Tokyo: Heibonsha, ISBN 978-4582620665
- Takahashi, Mutsuo (2023), Only Yesterday, Marfa, TX: Canarium Books, ISBN 978-1-7344816-5-5
- Tawada, Yoko (2017), Time Differences, Norwich, UK: Strangers Press, Keshiki Series, ISBN 978-1911343011
- Translations of stories by Ranpo Edogawa, Kaita Murayama, Taruho Inagaki, Kyūsaku Yumeno, and Sakutarō Hagiwara in Tyler, William J. (2008), Modanizumu: Modernist Fiction from Japan, 1913–1938, Honolulu: University of Hawaii Press, ISBN 978-0-8248-3242-1

=== Author ===
- Angles, Jeffrey (2011), Writing the Love of Boys: Origins of Bishōnen Culture in Modernist Japanese Literature, Minneapolis: University of Minnesota Press, ISBN 978-0-8166-6970-7
- Angles, Jeffrey (2016), These Things Here and Now: Poetic Responses to the March 11, 2011 Disasters, Tokyo: Josai University Educational Corporation University Press, ISBN 978-4-907630-54-6.
- Angles, Jeffrey (2016), Watashi no hizukehenkōsen わたしの日付変更線, Tokyo: Shichōsha, ISBN 978-4783735403

=== Editor ===
- Angles, Jeffrey; Rimer, J. Thomas, eds. (2006), Japan: A Traveler's Literary Companion, Berkeley: Whereabouts Press, ISBN 978-1-883513-16-0
- "Special issue on Hiromi Itō, U.S.-Japan Women's Journal, vol. 32.", U.s.-Japan Women's Journal. English Supplement, Tokyo: Josai International University, 2007, ISSN 1059-9770
