= Shuntaro Tanikawa =

Japanese poet and translator (1931–2024)

Shuntarō Tanikawa
- 谷川俊太郎
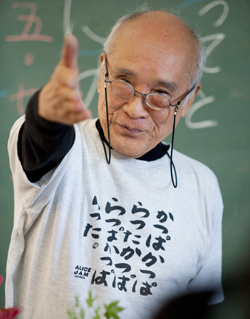
- Tanikawa in 2015
- Born: December 15, 1931; Suginami, Japan
- Died: November 13, 2024 (aged 92)
- Occupations: Poet, translator
- Notable work: Two Billion Light Years of Solitude (1952)
- Spouse: Eriko Kishida (m. 1954; div. 1955) Tomoko Okubo (m. 1957; div. 1989) Yōko Sano (m. 1990; div. 1996)
- Children: Kensaku Tanikawa; Shino Tanikawa
- Father: Tetsuzō Tanikawa

Shuntarō Tanikawa (谷川 俊太郎, Tanikawa Shuntarō; December 15, 1931 – November 13, 2024) was a Japanese poet, translator, children's author, and screenwriter. He was considered to be one of the most widely read and highly regarded Japanese poets, both in Japan and abroad. The English translation of his poetry volume Floating the River in Melancholy, translated by William I. Elliott and Kazuo Kawamura and illustrated by Yōko Sano, won the American Book Award in 1989.

== Career ==
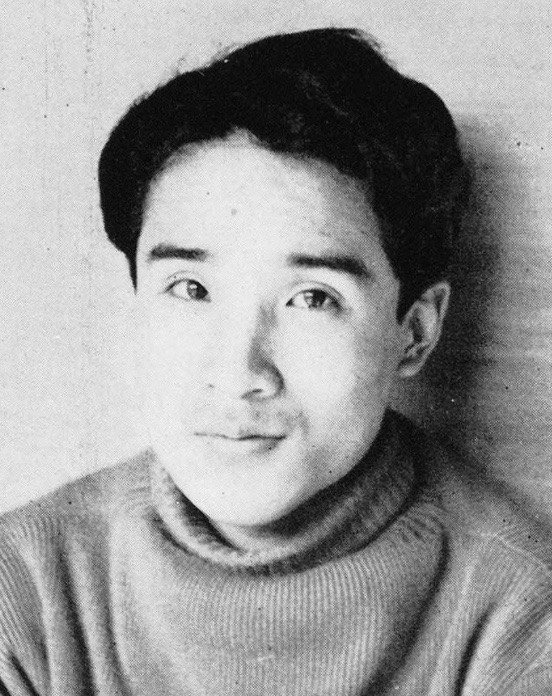
Tanikawa in the 1950s

Tanikawa has written more than 60 books of poetry in addition to translating Charles Schulz's Peanuts and the Mother Goose rhymes into Japanese. He was nominated for the 2008 Hans Christian Andersen Award for his contributions to children's literature. He was awarded Golden Wreath of Struga Poetry Evening in 2022. He also helped translate Swimmy by Leo Lionni into Japanese.

Among his contributions to less conventional art genres is Tanikawa's open video correspondence with Shūji Terayama (Video Letter, 1983). Since the 1970s, Tanikawa also provided short, onomatopoeic verses for picture books he published in collaboration with visual artist Sadamasa Motonaga, whom he had befriended during his residency in New York in 1966, offered by the Japan Society.

He collaborated several times with the lyricist Chris Mosdell, including creating a deck of cards created in the omikuji fortune-telling tradition of Shinto shrines, titled The Oracles of Distraction. Tanikawa also co-wrote Kon Ichikawa's Tokyo Olympiad and wrote the lyrics to the theme song of Howl's Moving Castle (film). Together with Jerome Rothenberg and Hiromi Itō, he has participated in collaborative renshi poetry, pioneered by Makoto Ōoka.

== Personal life ==
Tanikawa was born in 1931 to a philosopher Tetsuzō Tanikawa. When Tanikawa was 20, his father gave Tatsuji Miyoshi a notebook full of Tanikawa's high school poetry, which led to his Tanikawa's first work being published.

Tanikawa was divorced three times. His first wife was poet and translator Eriko Kishida. His third wife was author-illustrator Yōko Sano. Sano illustrated a volume of his poems: Onna Ni, translated by William I. Elliott and Kazuo Kawamura (Shueisha, 2012).

Tanikawa died in Tokyo on November 13, 2024, at the age of 92. He was survived by his son, composer Kensaku Tanikawa, his daughter, Shino Tanikawa, and several grandchildren.

== Selected works ==
=== Poetry (selected) ===
- Two Billion Light Years of Solitude (Sogensha, 1952)
- Sixty-two Sonnets (Sogensha, 1953), later published by Kodansha Plus Alpha Bunko
- On Love (Tokyo Sogensha, 1955)
- To You (Tokyo Sogensha, 1960)
- 21, (Thought Society, 1962)
- With silence my companion
- Crestfallen
- At midnight in the kitchen …
- The day the birds disappeared from the sky
- Definitions
- Coca-Cola Lessons
- A letter
- Floating down the river in melancholy
- Songs of nonsense
- Naked
- On giving people poems
- The naif
- Listening to Mozart
- To a woman
- Rather than pure white
- Minimal
- Mickey Mouse by night
- A Chagall and a leaf
- Me
- Kokoro (Asahi Shimbun Publications, 2013)
- Ordinary People

=== Novels and drama ===
- "The Rules of Flowers" Rironsha 1967
- "Pe (Collection of Short Stories)" Kodansha Bunko 1982
- "It's Always Now: Drama Collection by Shuntaro Tanikawa" Yamato Shobo 2009

=== Songs for television, radio and film (selected) ===
- Astro Boy (composed by Tatsuo Takai) – Theme song of the anime of the same name
- Big X (Composer: Isao Tomita) – Theme song of the anime of the same name
- Firebird (composed by Michel Legrand) – theme song for the movie of the same name
- If it's dangerous, it'll be money (composed by Harumi Ibe) – Theme song of the movie of the same name
- Promise of the World (composed by Yumi Kimura) – Theme song for the movie "Howl's Moving Castle" Sung by Chieko Baisho
- The Unborn Child (composed by Toru Takemitsu, 1963) – Theme song for the film "She and He" (directed by Susumu Hani, Iwanami Productions)
- KISS AND HUG (Composer: MISIA) – Theme song for the radio program of the same name
- Our Morning (composed by Hitoshi Komuro) – Theme song for Nippon Television's "Our Morning" Sung by Shigeru Matsuzaki

=== Translation ===
- Peanuts

== Awards and nominations ==
- 1962 – Won the 4th Japan Record Award for Best Lyricist for "Getsu Ka Sui Moku Kin Do Ni No Uta"
- 1975 – Received the Japan Translation Culture Award for "Mother Goose Songs"
- 1983 – Yomiuri Literature Prize for "Daily Maps"
- 1985 – Received the Hanatsubaki Prize for Contemporary Poetry for "Yoshinashi Uta"
- 1988 – Noma Children's Literature Prize for "Hadaka: A Collection of Poems by Shuntaro Tanikawa" and Shogakukan Literature Prize for "First Grader"
- 1992 – Maruyama Yutaka Memorial Contemporary Poetry Award for "Woman"
- 1993 – Received the Hagiwara Sakutaro Prize for "Sekenshirazu"
- 1996 – Asahi Prize
- 2005 – Japan Cultural Design Award
- 2006 – Mainichi Art Award for "Chagall and the Leaves"
- 2008 – Received the Poetry and Literature Museum Award for "I"
- 2010 – Received the Nobuo Ayukawa Award for "Tromso Collage"
- 2011 – Won the Zhongkun International Poetry Award, China's highest private award for poetry .
- 2016 – Received the Miyoshi Tatsuji Award for "On Poetry"
- 2019 – The Japan Foundation Awards
- 2022 – Winner of the Gold Award at the Struga Poetry Evening
- 2023 – The 75th NHK Broadcasting Culture Awards

In 1982, Tanikawa declined the 32nd Minister of Education's Art Encouragement Prize.
