= Yōko Sano =

Japanese writer and illustrator

- 佐野洋子
- Born: June 28, 1938; Beijing, China
- Died: November 5, 2010 (aged 72)
- Occupations: Writer and illustrator
- Notable work: The Cat that Lived a Million Times
- Honours: Medal of Honor with Purple Ribbon

Yōko Sano (Japanese: 佐野洋子(さのようこ); 28 June 1938 – 5 November 2010) was a Japanese writer and illustrator of children's books.

She is most well known for her 1977 book The Cat that Lived a Million Times. For her literary contributions, Sano was awarded the Medal of Honor with the Purple Ribbon in 2003 by the Emperor of Japan. She has also written essays, children's literature, screenplays, novels, and translated foreign picture books.

== Personal life ==
Yōko Sano was born in Beijing, China, on June 28, 1938, as the eldest daughter of seven children. When she was seven years old, her family moved to Dalian, China. Her father worked for the Mancuria Railway Research Department. In 1947 after the end of the Second Sino-Japanese War, Sano's family returned to Yamanashi Prefecture in Japan, where she initially stayed with her paternal uncle.

In 1942, she lost her third brother (who was 33 days old), and in 1947, her fourth brother (who was 4 years old), and in 1948, she lost her beloved older brother (aged 11). In 1958, Sano lost her father, Toshikazu (51 years old at the time of death). Sano's later writing style was said to be influenced by these losses, as well as by her strained relationship with her mother, Shizu.

Sano moved to Shizuoka City, Japan in 1950, and then to Shimizu in 1952. In 1958, the same year that she lost her father, Sano began attending Musashino Art University. Her classmates included Kōga Hirano and Kazuo Kamimura.

In 1962, after graduation, Sano joined an advertising company as a designer and illustrator. Around this time, she got married for the first time, eventually divorcing her first husband in 1980.

In the winter of 1966, Sano traveled to Europe and studied lithography at the Berlin School of Design for six months. She returned to Japan in 1968, and her eldest son, illustrator and painter Gen Hirose, was born later that year.

In 1990, she married the poet Shuntarō Tanikawa, and collaborated with him on his poetry volume Onni Ni, which she illustrated. They divorced in 1996.

In 2004, Sano underwent surgery to treat breast cancer, without success. She died on November 5, 2010, at a hospital in Tokyo, Japan, at 72 years old.

== Career ==
In 1971, Sano made her debut as a picture book author with Mr. Goat's Move (written by Mori Hisashi). A writer of many talents, Sano would go on to publish numerous children's books, becoming a staple of Japanese children's literature. She produced various styles of picture books, including Ojisan no kasa (Uncle's Umbrella; nominated for the 22nd Sankei Children's Publishing Culture Award in 1974), Watashi no bōshi (My Hat; winner of the 8th Kodansha Award for Picture Books), and Nē tōsan (Hey Papa; winner of the Shogakukan Children's Publication Culture Award). In 1977, Sano published her most well known picture book, The Cat Who Lived a Million Times, which became a domestic and international best-seller. By 2013, it had sold over 2 million copies.

In 1982, she published her first collection of essays, Please Forgive My Cats. In 1983, she won the first Niimi Nankichi Children's Literature Award for her children's story, When I Was a Little Sister. Throughout her career, Sano also produced illustrations for others’ works, translated foreign picture books into Japanese, wrote screenplays, and published novels. Her script Jitensha buta ga yatte kita (The Bicycle Pig Is Coming, 1987) was used in stage performances for children by the Maru Theater Company. In 1988, Sano published her first full-length autobiographical novel, The Right Heart.

Among other collaborative work, she illustrated a volume of Shuntarō Tanikawa's poems, Onna Ni (Floating the River in Melancholy), which was translated into English by William I. Eliott and Kazuo Kawamura and won the American Book Award in 1989.

In 2003, she was awarded the Medal of Honor with Purple Ribbon in Japan for her literary work and influence. In 2004, Sano received the Kobayashi Hideo Prize for her essay collection There is No God or Buddha.

In her essay collection Useless Days (published in 2006), Sano confessed that she had only two years left to live due to her cancer. That same year, her mother Shizu died at age 93. In 2008, she received the 31st Iwaya Konami Literary Prize for her many years of creative work as a children's book author.

Her last collection of essays was I'm Ready to Die, which was published June 2011, after she died in 2010.

== Posthumous ==
In 2012, a documentary, The Cat that Lived a Million Times (ドキュメンタリー映画 100万回生きたねこ, 100 Mankai Ikita Neko) was released, taking its name from Sano's popular 1977 children's book. It focused on Sano's later years, legacy, and her impact on the lives of young people in Japan. The movie was directed by Tadasuke Kotani and was shown at several film festivals.

In 2014, Yoko-san no Kotoba, a picture book-style introduction to Sano's essays, was produced and broadcast on NHK's One Seg 2 and Educational TV channels.

== Awards and nominations ==
- 1974 - Nominated for the 22nd Sankei Children's Publishing Culture Award for her picture book Uncle’s Umbrella
- 1977 - Won the Kodansha Publishing Culture Award Picture Book Award for her picture book My Hat
- 1983 - Winner of the Niimi Nankichi Literature Award for the children's story When I Was a Little Sister
- 1988 - Sankei Children's Publishing Culture Award for the children's story I'm Here
- 2000 – Winner of the Japan Picture Book Award for her translation of the picture book Hello, Red Fox! by Eric Carle
- 2002 - Winner of the Japan Picture Book Award and the Shogakukan Children's Publishing Culture Award for the picture book Hey Papa
- 2003 - Medal of Honor with the Purple Ribbon
- 2004 - Received the Kobayashi Literary Award

== Selected publications ==
=== Picture books ===
- Sue-chan and the Cat (Kogumasha, 1973)
- Uncle's Umbrella (Gingasha, 1974)
- "Because, But, Granny" (Froebel-kan, 1975)
- My Hat (Poplar Publishing, (1976)
- Remember the Big Tree (Gingasha, 1976)
- I'm a Cat (Kaiseisha, 1977)
- The Cat Who Lived a Million Times (Kodansha, 1977)
- The Sounds of That Day, Grandma (Froebel-kan, 1982)
- Flying Lion (Kodansha, 1982)
- My Friend is Momo (Libroport, 1983)
- I'll Give You My Bird (Froebel-kan, 1984)
- Children (Libroport, 1984)
- Ordinary Bear (Bunka Publishing Bureau, 1984)
- Sorry for being completely different (illustrated by Shinta Dowaya, 1985)
- Santa Claus is an Old Lady (Froebel-kan, 1988)
- Peter and the Wolf (Hyoronsha, 1990)
  - There is also a CD of the book read by Sanma Akashiya (Toshiba EMI, 1998).

=== Illustrations ===
- Seven Pockets (Text: KimikoAman, Rironsha)

=== Others ===
- When I was a Little Sister (Kaiseisha, 1982)
- Please Forgive My Cats (Libroport, 1982, later Chikuma Bunko)
- Acacia, Karatachi, and Wheat Fields (Bunka Publishing Bureau, 1983, later Chikuma Bunko)
- Just a Pig (Hakusensha, 1983, later published by Chuko Bunko)
- Cats Only: The World of Yoko Sano (Kodansha, 1983, later published in paperback)
- An Introduction to Love Theory (Fuyukisha, 1984, later published by Chuko Bunko)
- Admission fee: 880 yen (including drink) (co-authored by Shuntaro Tanikawa, Hakusensha, 1984, later published as a Shueisha Bunko book)
- All Lies: New Interpretation of World Fairy Tales (Kodansha, 1985, later paperback)
- Love is the Best (Togasha, 1986, later Shincho Bunko)
- I Don't Think So (Chikuma Shobo, 1987, later published in paperback)
- When I opened the door to that garden (KS Planning, 1987)
- I'm Here (Dowaya, 1987, later published by Kodansha Bunko)
- Pig Over There, Pig Over There (Komine Shoten, 1988)
- Go Mojimoji Go Gorilla (Hakusensha, 1988, later Chuko Bunko)
- Otome-chan: A Little Story of Love and Fantasy (Yamato Shobo, 1988, later published by Kodansha Bunko)
- Friends are Useless (Chikuma Shobo (Chikuma Primer Books), 1988, later paperback)
- The Right Heart (Libroport, 1988)
- Yoko Sano's book (published by Book Magazine Company in 1989, retitled "I'm Not Going to Try," Shincho Bunko)
- When I Was a Little Sister/Children (Fukutake Bunko, 1990 (Kaiseisha edition with additional essays))
- My Christmas Tree (Kodansha, 1990)
- Ordinary is Great (Magazine House, 1991)
- Peko Peko (Bunka Publishing Bureau, 1993)
- From Kokoro (Magazine House, 1993, later Kodansha Bunko)
- Michiko's Lazy Diary (Rironsha, 1994)
- Two Summers (co-authored with Shuntaro Tanikawa, Kobunsha, 1995)
- A Woman (co-authored with Gen Hirose, Magazine House, 1995)
- Catmania (published by PARCO, 1997)
- The Woman Over There, the Cat Over There: A Collection of Yoko Sano's Illustrations and Prose (Kodansha, 1999)
- I Hate This, I Love That (Asahi Shimbun, 2000, later published in paperback)
- Sister and Dad (Shogakukan, 2001)
- There is no God or Buddha (Chikuma Shobo, 2003, later published in paperback)
- I Don't Remember (Magazine House, 2006, later Shincho Bunko)
- Shizuko-san (Shinchosha, April 2008, later published in paperback)
- Useless Days (Essay Collection, Asahi Shimbun Publications, May 2008)
- When the Angel Was (Asahi Shimbun Publications, December 2008)
- There's a Problem (Chikuma Shobo, July 2009)
- Mr. Kuku's Marriage, Mrs. Kiki's Happiness (Asahi Shimbun Publications, October 2009)
- Yoko Sano Dialogue Collection: The Basics of Life (Kodansha, February 2011)
- I'm Ready to Die (Kobunsha, June 2011)
