= Naoki Inose =

Japanese politician and writer (b. 1946)

- 猪瀬 直樹
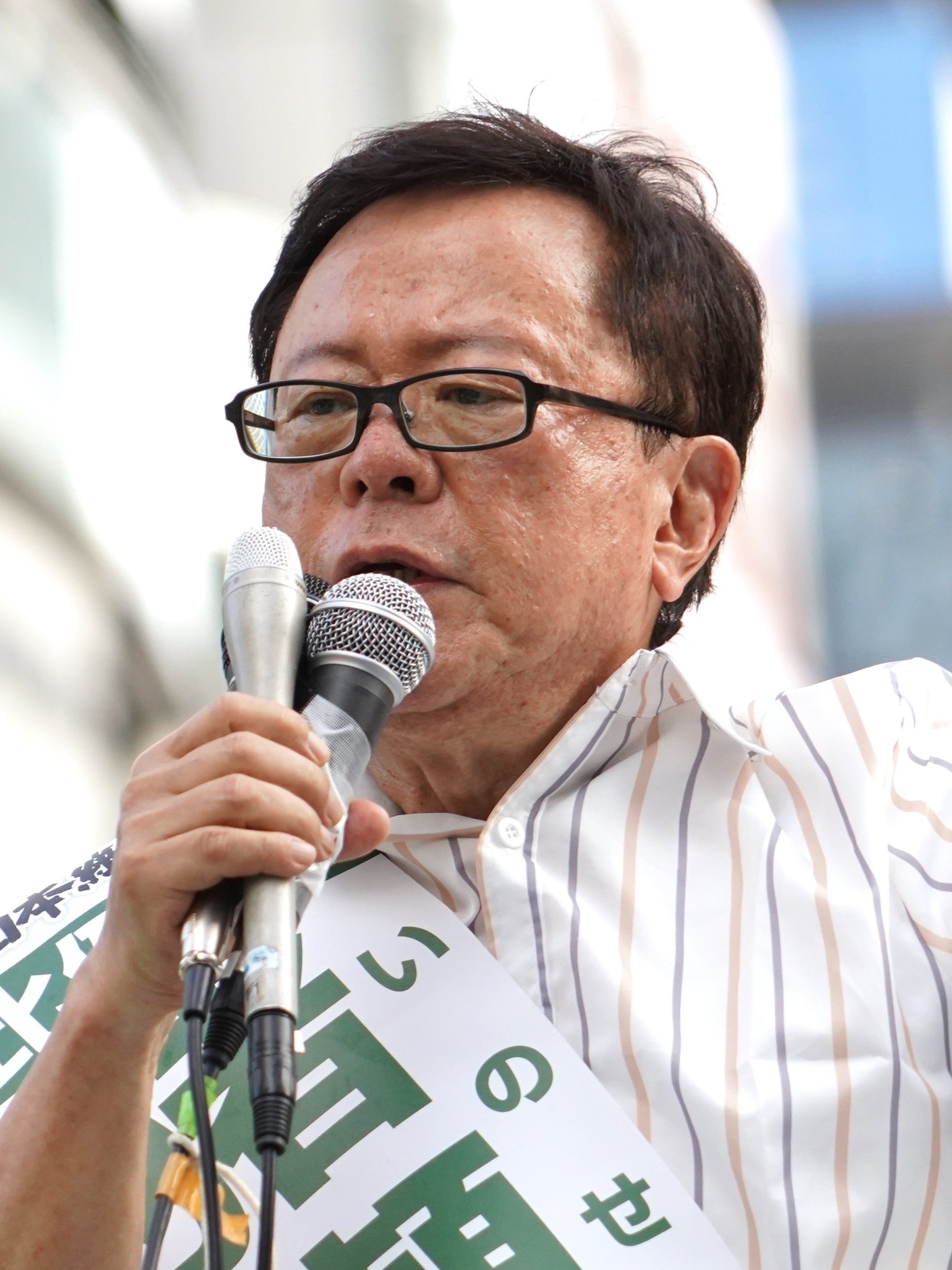
- Inose in 2022

Member of the House of Councillors
- Incumbent
- Assumed office 26 July 2022
- Constituency: National PR

Governor of Tokyo
- In office 18 December 2012 – 24 December 2013; Acting: 1 November 2012 - 17 December 2012
- Monarch: Akihito
- Preceded by: Shintarō Ishihara
- Succeeded by: Yōichi Masuzoe

Lieutenant Governor of Tokyo
- In office June 2007 – December 2012
- Governor: Shintaro Ishihara

Personal details
- Born: 20 November 1946 (age 79) Iiyama, Nagano, Japan
- Party: Innovation (since 2022)
- Other political affiliations: Independent (2007–2022)
- Education: Shinshu University; Meiji University
- Occupation: Biographer, journalist

Naoki Inose (猪瀬 直樹, Inose Naoki; born 20 November 1946) is a Japanese politician, journalist, historian, social critic and biographer of literary figures such as Yukio Mishima and Osamu Dazai. He served as Lieutenant Governor of Tokyo from June 2007 until becoming Acting Governor on 1 November 2012 following the resignation of Shintaro Ishihara. He was elected Governor in a historical landslide victory in December 2012, but announced his resignation on December 19, 2013, following a political funds-related scandal; his resignation was approved and became effective December 24, 2013.

== Early life ==
Inose was born in Nagano Prefecture; his father died of angina when Inose was three years old. He attended elementary and junior high schools affiliated with Shinshu University, and ultimately enrolled at Shinshu in 1966. He graduated from Shinshu University in 1970 and moved to Tokyo, where he was married later in the year. He enrolled in graduate school for political science at Meiji University in 1972, and had two children, born in 1974 and 1978.

== Career as author ==
Inose's 1983 book Shōwa 16-nen Natsu no Haisen (昭和16年夏の敗戦; literally, "Defeated in War in the Summer of 1941") describes the findings of the Total War Research Institute (総力戦研究所, Sōryokusen Kenkyūjo). During the International Military Tribunal for the Far East, the Institute would be accused of being part of Japan's militaristic machine, but Inose asserts that it was little more than a think-tank, of which the purpose was to examine dispassionately the consequences of a total war. Its conclusion was that "there [would] be no way for Japan to win the war because of its clear material inferiority. The war [would] be drawn out. The Soviet Union [would] butt in, and Japan [would] be defeated. Therefore, going to war with the United States must absolutely be avoided."

This book was followed in 1987 by The Mikado's Portrait (帝の肖像, Mikado no Shōzō), concerning the development of the image of the Emperor, and the biographies of Yukio Mishima, Osamu Dazai and Kikuchi Kan: Persona (Perusona, 1995), Picaresque (Pikaresuku, 2000), and The Realm of Heart (心の王国, Kokoro no Ōkoku,; 2004). In 2009, his 1993 book "The Century of Black Ships" (黒船の世紀, Kurofune no Seiki) was published in English. In 2012, Inose's 1995 biography of Mishima was published in English under the title Persona: A Biography of Yukio Mishima, edited and adapted by Hiroaki Sato and published by Stone Bridge Press.

Inose's examination of public affairs led him to bitter criticisms of Japan's ruling classes and their reluctance to enact reform. His longstanding proposal was for the privatisation of the four public highway corporations, and reform of the postal savings system that finances them. As a result, he joined Prime Minister Junichirō Koizumi's taskforce and served on the commission to examine the Japan Highway Public Corporation (Nihon Doro Kodan). His insistence that cuts be made was so uncompromising that some other appointees declined positions on the board.

Inose said that Japan lost World War II because the government at the time ignored data suggesting Japan would be unable to defeat the Allies and forbade access to the information before Tokyo declared war in 1941. He has further argued that this action is being repeated today by bureaucrats with respect to the economy. He advocated that people share accurate information with respect to Japan's economic situation, that is not necessarily issued by bureaucrats, in efforts to help a debt-ridden Japan. He claims that "any reform can be implemented if people share more accurate and objective data than that (initially) released by authorities."

== Political career ==
On 15 June 2007, Governor Shintaro Ishihara announced that Inose had agreed to serve as a lieutenant governor for the capital stating that "our opinions might differ but I believe it is healthy for us to debate and discuss many of our differences." Inose was initially at odds with LDP lawmakers in the metropolitan assembly during confirmation hearings, and shortly thereafter overturned an LDP-sponsored urban redevelopment initiative, although Ishihara later pressured Inose to cooperate with the LDP lawmakers.

Upon his resignation in 2012, Governor Ishihara designated Inose as his interim successor; Inose was elected as governor of Tokyo in the 2012 Tokyo gubernatorial election with the largest number of votes in Tokyo history. His platform included reform of the Tokyo Electric Power Company and the merger of Tokyo Metro with the Tokyo Metropolitan Bureau of Transportation subway network, although he made minimal progress with either issue following his election.

=== Role in Olympic bid ===
As governor, Inose served as the Chairman of Tokyo's successful bid for the 2020 Summer Olympics. He attended the 2012 Summer Olympics in London in order to launch Tokyo's campaign for the Games.

He created controversy in April 2013 when he made a comment that was seen as a criticism of the Muslim world, as well as Istanbul and their bid for the 2020 Olympics: "Well, compare the two countries where they have yet to build infrastructure, very sophisticated facilities. So from time to time, like Brazil, I think it’s good to have a venue for the first time. But Islamic countries, the only thing they share in common is Allah and they are fighting with each other and they have classes." Criticizing rival bids is forbidden under IOC rules; following Inose's statement, Tokyo 2020 made a statement saying that they "have the utmost respect for all candidate cities and have always taken pride in bidding in a spirit based on the Olympic values of excellence, respect and friendship.” Inose apologized for his comments a few days later and stated that he was "fully committed" to respecting IOC rules. Japan later won its bid for the Olympics under Inose's chairmanship.

=== Money scandal and resignation ===
In November 2013, Inose became embroiled in a scandal concerning cash he received from the Tokushukai hospital group led by Torao Tokuda, father of Lower House member Takeshi Tokuda. Inose claimed to have borrowed 50 million yen as a personal loan from Tokushukai, delivered to him in cash in exchange for a written IOU in November 2012, and that he repaid the loan in cash in September 2013. The loan was interest and collateral-free, and the funds were kept in a safe deposit box rather than in a bank account, without being reported to Japanese campaign finance authorities as part of Inose's assets.

The Tokyo Metropolitan Government Assembly conducted four days of public questioning of Inose in December, over the course of which Inose's recollection of events changed in several respects. The Assembly then established a special committee to investigate Inose, the first incidence of the assembly formally investigating a governor.

The Asahi Shimbun called for Inose's resignation in an editorial on December 12, while the Mainichi Shimbun called him "no longer viable" as a governor on the same day. A Sankei Shimbun poll released on December 16 found that 89% of Tokyo respondents thought that Inose's explanation of the funds was not credible, while 63% thought he was no longer an appropriate representative of Tokyo as an Olympic host city.

Inose announced his resignation as governor on December 19, 2013, following direct pressure from various senior political figures including ex-Governor Ishihara and Prime Minister Shinzō Abe. In his resignation speech, he characterized himself as an "amateur" at politics and expressed hope "that our next governor will be a real political pro who can guide Tokyo successfully through the Olympics." He expressed his desire to continue writing following his resignation as governor. The Tokyo Metropolitan Assembly approved and formalized his resignation on December 24.

Inose was succeeded as interim governor by Vice Governor Tatsumi Ando. His term of office as governor was the shortest in Tokyo history at only 372 days. Yōichi Masuzoe won the February 2014 election to determine Inose's final successor as governor. In June 2016 Masuzoe also stepped down after a money scandal.

== Personal life ==
Inose is a runner who jogs every day, and completed the 2012 Tokyo Marathon. He also holds a black belt in judo.

== Publications ==
=== English translated works ===
- The Century of Black Ships: Chronicles of War between Japan and America. VIZ Media LLC. 2009. ISBN 978-1-4215-2917-2.
- Persona: A Biography of Yukio Mishima. Stone Bridge Press. 2013. ISBN 978-1-61172-008-2.

=== Japanese-language works ===
- Shōwa 16-nen Natsu no Haisen (昭和16年夏の敗戦). Sekai Bunkasha (世界文化社). 1983. ISBN 4418836047.
- Shisha-tachi no Lockheed Jiken (死者たちのロッキード事件). Bungeishunjū (文藝春秋). 1983. ISBN 4163385509.
- Nippon Bonjin Den (日本凡人伝). Shinchōsha (新潮社). 1985. ISBN 4101389012.
- Asatte no Jō (あさってのジョー). Shinchōsha (新潮社). 1985. ISBN 4103574011.
- Mikado no Shōzō (帝の肖像). Shōgakkan (小学館). 1986. ISBN 4093941610.
- Tennō no Kagebōshi (天皇の影法師). Shinchōsha (新潮社). 1987. ISBN 4101389020.
- Shi o Mitsumeru Shigoto (死を見つめる仕事). Shinchōsha (新潮社). 1987. ISBN 410357402X.
- Nidome no Shigoto – Nippon Bonjin Den (二度目の仕事-日本凡人伝). Shinchōsha (新潮社). 1988. ISBN 4101389039.
- Tochi no Shinwa (土地の神話). Shōgakkan (小学館). 1988. ISBN 4093941629.
- Tokyo, Nagai Yume (東京、ながい夢). Kawade Shobō Shinsha (河出書房新社). 1989. ISBN 4309005780.
- News no Bōken (ニューズの冒険). Bungeishunjū (文藝春秋). 1989. ISBN 4163435409.
- Ima o Tsukamu Shigoto (今をつかむ仕事). Shinchōsha (新潮社). 1989. ISBN 4103574038.
- Furusato o Tsukutta Otoko (ふるさとを創った男). Nippon Hōsō Shuppan Kyōkai (日本放送出版協会). 1990. ISBN 4140051574.
- Yokubō no Media (欲望のメディア). Shōgakkan (小学館). 1990. ISBN 4093941637.
- Mikado to Seikimatsu—Ōken no Ronri (ミカドと世紀末―王権の論理). Shinchōsha (新潮社). 1990. ISBN 4101389047.
- Mikado no Kuni no Kigōron (カドの国の記号論). Shōgakkan (小学館). 1991. ISBN 4093893314.
- News no Kōkogaku (ニュースの考古学). Bungeishunjū (文藝春秋). 1992. ISBN 4163468900.
- Meiro no Tatsujin—Inose Naoki Essay Zenshūsei (迷路の達人―猪瀬直樹エッセイ全集成). Bungeishunjū (文藝春秋). 1993. ISBN 4163474102.
- Kinki no Ryōiki (禁忌の領域). Bungeishunjū (文藝春秋). 1993. ISBN 4163480404.
- Tokyo Requiem (東京レクイエム). Kawade Shobō Shinsha (河出書房新社). 1995. ISBN 4309472850.
- Persona―Mishima Yukio Den (ペルソナ―三島由紀夫伝). Bungeishunjū (文藝春秋). 1995. ISBN 4163508104.
- Nippon o Yomitoku! (ニッポンを読み解く! ). Shōgakkan (小学館). 1996. ISBN 4093893322.
- Hinshi no Journalism (瀕死のジャーナリズム). Bungeishunjū (文藝春秋). 1996. ISBN 4163520309.
- Nipponkoku no Kenkyū (日本国の研究). Bungeishunjū (文藝春秋). 1997. ISBN 4163527206.
- Boku no Seishun Roman (僕の青春放浪). Bungeishunjū (文藝春秋). 1998. ISBN 4167431068.
- Magazine Seishunfu (マガジン青春譜). Shōgakkan (小学館). 1998. ISBN 4093941653.
- Zoku Nipponkoku no Kenkyū (続・日本国の研究). Bungeishunjū (文藝春秋). 1999. ISBN 4163549501.
- Asu mo Yūyake (明日も夕焼け). Bungeishunjū (文藝春秋). 2000. ISBN 4022575107.
- Picaresque―Dazai Osamu Den (ピカレスク―太宰治伝). Shōgakkan (小学館). 2000. ISBN 4093941661.
- Nippon Fukkatsu no Scenario―Ronkyaku 20-nin no Ketsuron (日本復活のシナリオ―論客20人の結論). PHP Kenkyūjo (PHP研究所). 2002. ISBN 4569620728.
- Nippon System no Shinwa (日本システムの神話). Kadokawa Shoten (角川書店). 2002. ISBN 404704105X.
- Kokoro no Ōkoku (こころの王国). Bungeishunjū (文藝春秋). 2004. ISBN 4163658505.
- Kessen: Yūsei Min'eika (決戦・郵政民営化). PHP Kenkyūjo (PHP研究所). 2005. ISBN 4569642268.
- Zero Seichō no Fukokuron (ゼロ成長の富国論). Bungeishunjū (文藝春秋). 2005. ISBN 4163669507.
- Dōro no Kenryoku (道路の権力). Bungeishunjū (文藝春秋). 2006. ISBN 4167431122.
- Dōro no Ketchaku (道路の決着). Shōgakkan (小学館). 2006. ISBN 409394167X.
- Sakka no Tanjō (作家の誕生). Asahi Shinbunsha (朝日新聞社). 2007. ISBN 978-4022731487.
- Kūki to Sensō (空気と戦争). Bungeishunjū (文藝春秋). 2007. ISBN 978-4166605835.
- Ninomiya Kinjirō wa Naze Maki o Seotte Iru no ka?―Jinkō Messhō Shakai no Seichō Senryaku (二宮金次郎はなぜ薪を背負っているのか?―人口減少社会の成長戦略). Bungeishunjū (文藝春秋). 2007. ISBN 978-4167431143.
- Kokoro no Ōkoku―Kikuchi Kan to Bungeishunjū no Tanjō (こころの王国―菊池寛と文藝春秋の誕生). Bungeishunjū (文藝春秋). 2008. ISBN 978-4167431150.
- Kuni o Kaeru Chikara―Nippon Saisei o Saguru 10-nin no Teigen (国を変える力―ニッポン再生を探る10人の提言). Daiyamondosha (ダイヤモンド社). 2008. ISBN 978-4478006757.
- Kasumigaseki "Kaitai" Sensō (霞が関「解体」戦争). Sōshisha (草思社). 2008. ISBN 978-4794216816.
- Nippon no Mirai o Tsukuru―Chihō Bunken no Grand Design (日本の未来をつくる―地方分権のグランドデザイン). Bungeishunjū (文藝春秋). 2009. ISBN 978-4160080744.
- Jimmy no Tanjōbi: America ga Tennō Akihito ni Kizanda "Shi no Angō" (ジミーの誕生日 アメリカが天皇明仁に刻んだ「死の暗号」). Bungeishunjū (文藝春秋). 2009. ISBN 978-4163721309.
- Tokyo no Fukuchiji ni Natte Mitara (東京の副知事になってみたら). Shōgakkan (小学館). 2010. ISBN 978-4098250882.
- Kowareyuku Kuni (壊れゆく国). Nikkei BP Sha (日経BP社). 2010. ISBN 978-4822215859.
