= Persona: A Biography of Yukio Mishima =

2012 book by Naoki Inose with Hiroaki Sato

- Persona: A Biography of Yukio Mishima
- Author: Naoki Inose with Hiroaki Sato
- Language: English
- Genre: non-fiction
- Publisher: Stone Bridge Press
- Publication date: November 2012
- Pages: 864 pp
- ISBN: 978-1-61172-008-2

Persona: A Biography of Yukio Mishima is a 2012 biography of Yukio Mishima written by Naoki Inose with Hiroaki Sato, and published by Stone Bridge Press. It is an expanded adaptation in English of Inose's 1995 Mishima biography, Persona: Mishima Yukio den, published by Bungeishunjū in Tokyo, Japan.

== Reception ==
After the book's release in 2012, it garnered positive reviews from the press. Paul McCarthy of The Japan Times said, "Those who are interested in the brilliantly gifted writer of mid-20th century Japan who is its subject will learn much from this volume, and should be stimulated to go back and read, or re-read, what Yukio Mishima has left us." Allan Massie, writing for The Wall Street Journal, said, "Mr. Inose doesn't attempt to explain Mishima's grisly end—it may be that the Japanese reader needs no such explanation—but does show him to have been an extraordinary man, in many respects a sympathetic one, and a writer of extraordinary range."
