= Rai San'yō =

Japanese writer

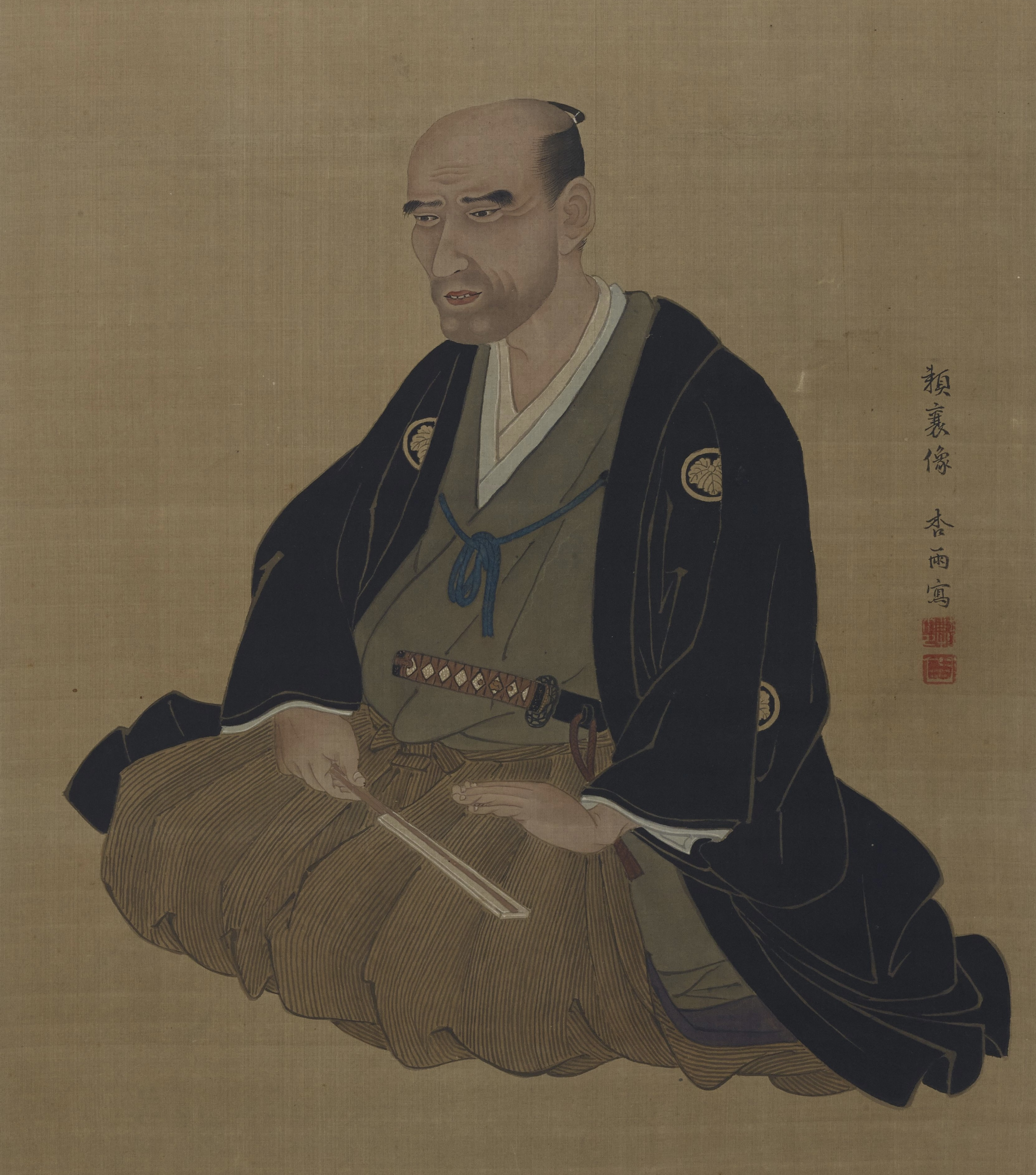
Rai San'yō (Kyoto University Museum)

Rai San'yō (Japanese: 頼 山陽; 21 January 1780, Aki Province – 16 October 1832, Kyoto) was a Japanese Confucianist philosopher, historian, artist and poet of the later Edo period. His true name was Rai Noboru.

== Biography ==
He was born to a samurai family of the Hiroshima Domain. His father, Rai Shunsui, was a respected Neo-Confucian teacher. His mother, Baisi, was a poet of some note. He first studied humanities with his uncles, who were notable Neo-Confucian scholars. Then, in 1797, he went to the Shōheikō, a training school for government bureaucrats in Edo.

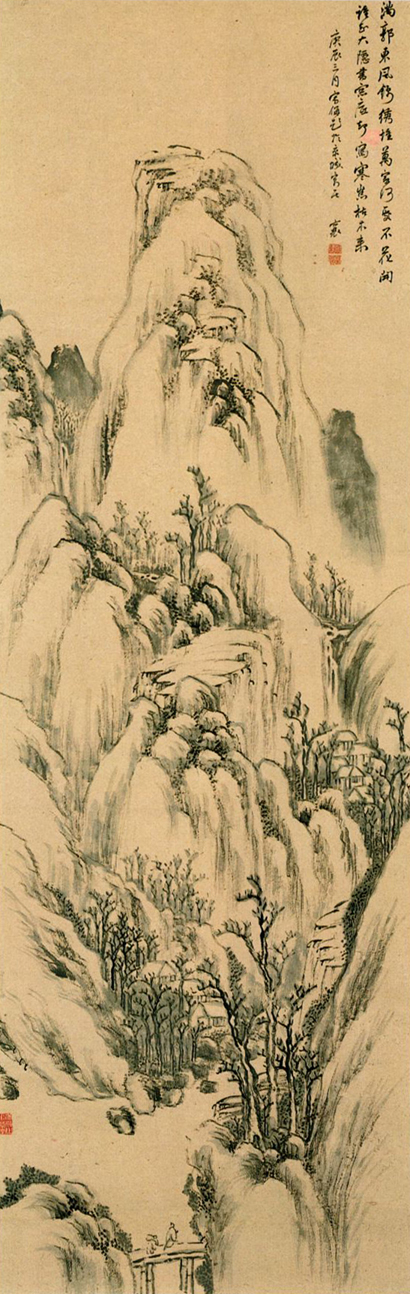
Wintry Trees

Wishing to devote himself to writing instead, at the age of nineteen he detached himself from his domain and became a wandering scholar. This was a serious crime without receiving special permission so, to save him from greater punishment, his father disinherited him and locked him in his room for three years. He spent this time studying and writing. It was there he conceived the idea for his Nihon Gaishi ("Unofficial History of Japan") and began composing the first chapters. Many years before, his father had been engaged in writing an official history, but permission had been suddenly withdrawn.

In 1811, he moved to Kyoto, opened a school and continued to work on his history. He soon became part of a circle of writers and scholars that included Yanagawa Seigan and Ōshio Heihachirō and came under the influence of the Kokugaku movement. He was finally able to achieve financial independence and travelled throughout Japan, writing Kanshi poetry.

One of the main influences of his life was Ema Saikō, a distinguished bunjin painter and composer of kanshi, whom he met in 1813 when visiting her father to further his reputation as a scholar. He was instantly captivated by Ema and expressed his desire for marriage after a few meetings. However, either by rejection of her father because of Ema's previous rejection of marriage or because Rai San'yō decided against asking for her hand, no such marriage took place. Rai San'yō soon married his 17-year-old maid Rie, whom he also taught to compose verse and paint. He did become Ema Saikō's kanshi tutor in 1813 and the two remained close until his death. Through correspondence, he would correct her verses and send her his own poems to practice calligraphy.

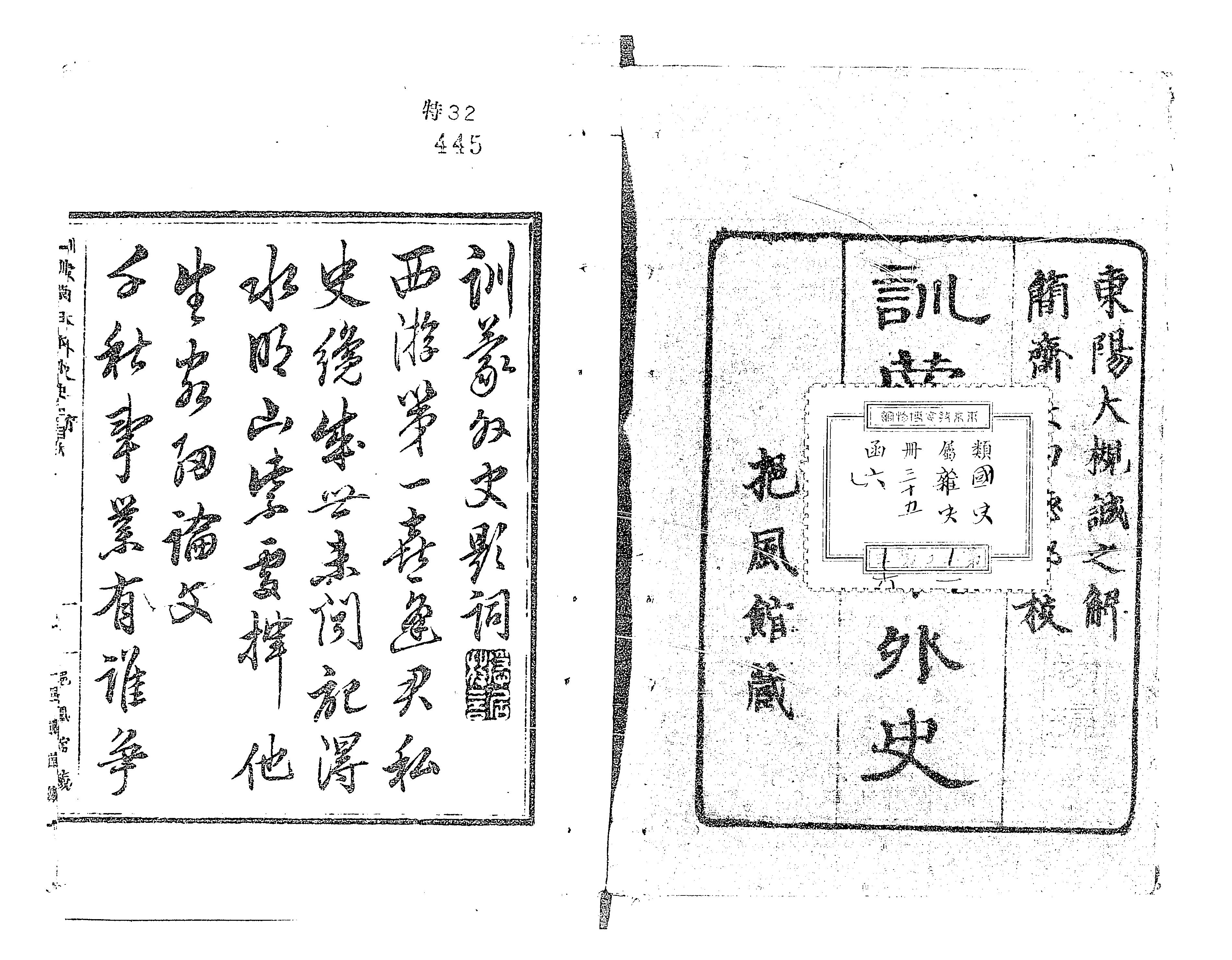
Title page from the 1874 edition of Nihon Gaishi

In 1827, he completed the Nihon Gaishi, his life work, It was modeled on the Records of the Grand Historian and was in 22 volumes, covering Japanese history from the emergence of the Minamoto clan through the reign of Tokugawa Iemitsu. It was the first comprehensive study of its kind. The work was dedicated to the daimyō, Matsudaira Sadanobu, who praised it and presented it to the shogunate for approval. Despite winning that approval, it was later banned in several domains, possibly because it advocated strengthening the powers of the Emperor. It has been cited as a major influence on the Sonnō jōi movement.

He was also the author of "Records of Japan's Government", in 16 volumes; "Morality and Duty", in 3 volumes; several books of verse and travel diaries. He was also an ink wash painter of modest reputation, associated with the Nanga School.

In his later years, he suffered from tuberculosis and succumbed to the disease while working at his desk.
