= Kansuke Naka =

Japanese novelist and essayist

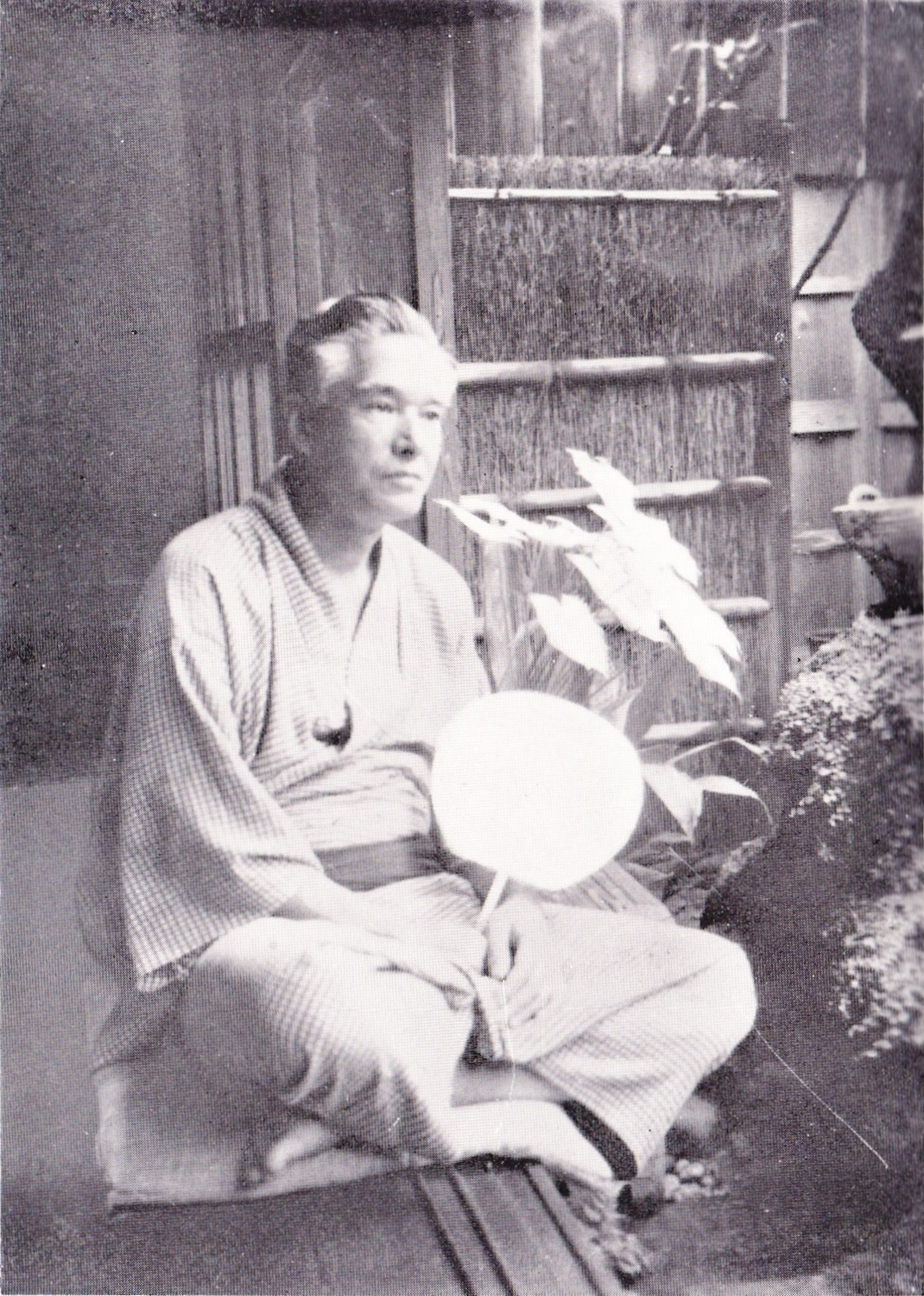

Kansuke Naka (中 勘助, Naka Kansuke, 22 May 1885 – 3 May 1965) was a Japanese novelist and essayist.

Naka was born in Tokyo. He lived in Hiratsuka from 1926 to 1932, and he was evacuated to Shizuoka Prefecture during World War II, but otherwise he spent most of his life in Tokyo. He married Kazuko Shimada in 1942.

Naka was one of the students taught by Natsume Sōseki at the University of Tokyo before Sōseki gave up teaching to write for the newspaper Asahi Shimbun. It was Sōseki who arranged the serial publication in that paper of Naka's first novel Gin no saji ("The Silver Spoon"), a nostalgic depiction of his childhood and teens. The novel was published from 1911 to 1913 and translated in 1976 by Etsuko Terasaki. It is popular in Japan and is an account of life in Tokyo at the beginning of the 20th century during the Meiji era, replete with historical details as well as a contemporary sense of isolation; it follows Naka's psychological journey from childhood to adulthood. Naka also wrote Inu ("The Dog", 1922) and Rōkan (a collection of poems, 1935).

Naka was praised by Tetsurō Watsuji, a leading critic, and also by Zhou Zuoren, for his rare willingness to criticize Japanese nationalists.

== Bibliography ==
- Kansuke Naka, The Silver Spoon, translated by Etsuko Terasaki, Chicago Review Press, distributed by Swallow Press, 1976.
- Louis Frédéric, entry on Naka in the Japan Encyclopedia, translated by Käthe Roth, Harvard University Press, 2005, page 689.
- Kansuke Naka, The Silver Spoon, translated by Hiroaki Sato, Stone Bridge Press, 2015.
