= Ema Saikō =

Japanese painter, poet, and calligrapher (1787–1861)

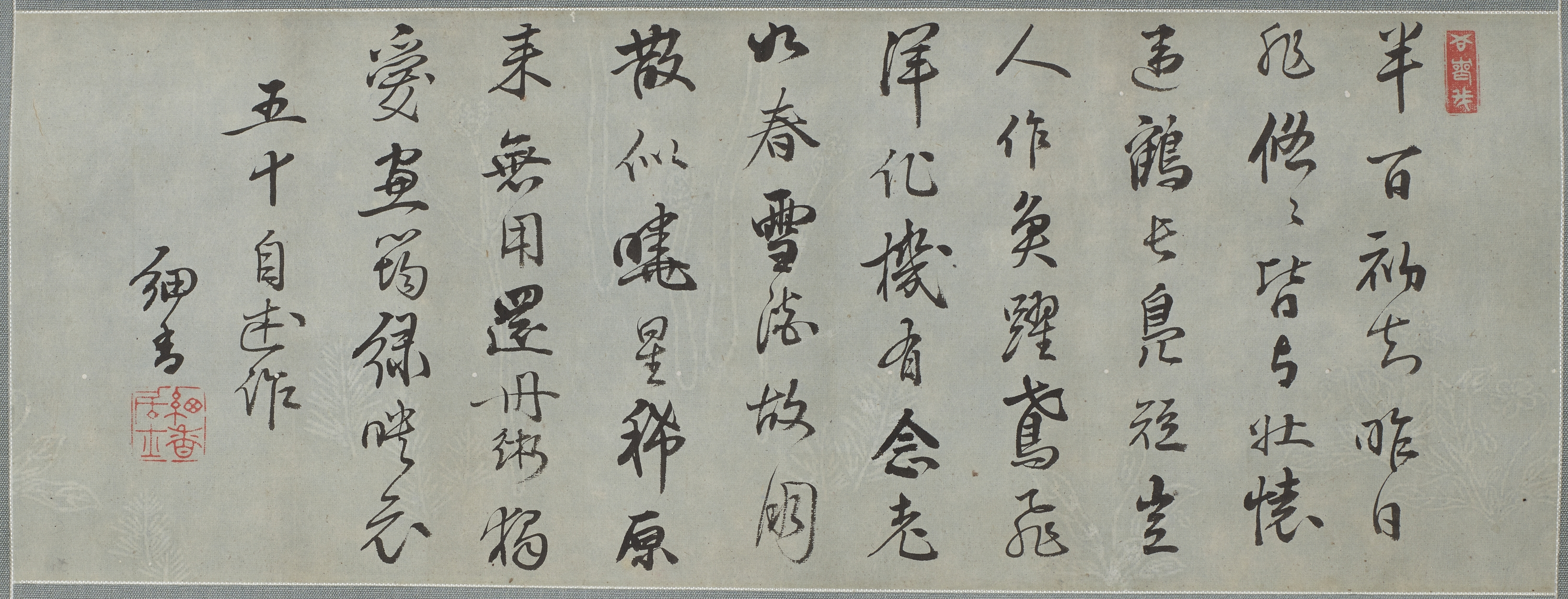
"On Becoming Fifty," 1836

Ema Saikō (江馬 細香; 1787–1861) was a Japanese painter, poet and calligrapher celebrated for her Chinese-style art in the late Edo period. Her specialisation as a bunjin, a painter of Chinese-style art using monochrome ink, was the bamboo plant which she perfected and which inspired her pen name. Her kanshi poetry is known for being self-reflective and having autobiographical quality. She was one of the most well-known and most praised Japanese artists of her age.

== Early life ==
Ema Saikō was born in 1787 in Ōgaki, Mino Province. She was the first daughter born into the wealthy Ema family. Not much is known about her mother or siblings. Her father was Ema Ransai, a scholar of rangaku (‘Dutch studies’), a discipline entailing knowledge of chemistry and anatomy brought in by the Dutch, only Western foreigners allowed contact to Japan. He soon recognised his daughter's talent in painting and began to support her education. Ema Saikō began to paint at an early age: her bamboo paintings date back to 1792, when she was five years old. The bamboo theme would remain her speciality throughout her career; it was considered one of the 'Four Gentlemen' – the plum, the orchid, the chrysanthemum and the bamboo – which were common subjects represented in art following Chinese fashion. At the age of 13, her father arranged for her to be mentored by Gyokurin, a monk-painter from the temple Eikan-do in Kyoto skilled in bunjinga. Due to the physical distance between student and tutor, she was taught through correspondence as was customary during the time. Thus, she received models from Gyokurin to copy and sent back her results which the monk would inspect to send her his annotations and criticism. Ema maintained correspondence until his death when she was 27, expressing her mourning in a poem.

Ema began to compose kanshi, verses in classical Chinese, in her teenage years – much later than she began to paint, but as a direct consequence of it. Chinese-style paintings often included kanshi which served as an addition and elaboration of the painting itself. It was assessed at the times that fluency in Chinese could be achieved by a dedicated and talented student but would take years of practice; and even then, composers would remain insecure about the quality of their verses, especially when leaving a homogenous Japanese environment and presenting their work to native Chinese speakers. Ema Ransai endorsed his daughter's education and aided her in her Chinese studies, enabling Ema Saikō to soon advance in the art and becoming a renowned kanshi poet.

== Adulthood and career ==
From childhood onwards, there is evidence that Ema Saikō valued her studies and practice of her art highly. When her father selected a husband for his daughter, she refused marriage on the ground that she needed to focus on her paintings and verses. It shows the high respect and affection for his daughter that Ema Ransai adhered to this decision and married Saikō's suitor to her younger sister. The couple would become heads of the Ema household in which Ema Saikō lived her entire life.

In her twenties, Ema became increasingly well connected as appreciation for her art increased and intellectuals all over Japan began to recognise her talent. Her tutor Gyokurin had displayed her work, noting that it received more attention than that of his other pupils; the scholar Oyamada Tomokiyo cited a poem of hers in a publication in 1814.

=== Ema Saikō and Rai San’yō ===
The same year, at the age of 27, she met Rai San'yō, a rising scholar who was also accomplished in Chinese-style writing and calligraphy and an amateur in painting. Their relationship is seen as defining for both artists throughout their lives. Rai San’yō met Ema when visiting her father, to whom – a distinguished physician and scholar of Dutch medicine with a background of studies in Chinese culture – Rai San’yō paid a customary visit to increase his own reputation and connectedness. Rai San’yō was instantly captivated by Ema, detailing his infatuation in a letter to a friend in Kyoto, Konishi Genzui. In the letter, he describes his attraction to her, her previous abandonment of marriage ideas, insinuates that she should marry him and attests that she share similar feelings.

Ema and Rai San’yō met two more times that year. Through enquiry by her father, Ema became Rai San’yō's kanshi and calligraphy student to improve her verses. The exact nature of her feelings towards Rai San’yō remain unclear, as well as the circumstances of a potential union between the two. Some scholars believe that Rai San’yō did not ask her father for her hand in marriage, assessing himself – disowned by his father and with a struggling reputation – to be of no status to become marry into the prestigious Ema family. Other scholars assess that in her absence, Rai San’yō did ask Ema Ransai for Ema Saikō's hand in marriage. Following this version, Ema Ransai, adhering to Saikō's previous rejection of marriage in favour of her art, rejected Rai San’yō without the knowledge that the feeling might have been mutual. In any event, Rai San’yō married Rie, his seventeen-year-old maid, soon after. Ema Saikō remained his student until he died, mainly through correspondence. For teaching calligraphy, Rai San’yō would send her poems that he or other writer composed for her to copy them and send back the result for his inspection. Similarly, she sent him her composed Kanshi which he then would assess and return with his comments. The intimacy of their correspondence and the poems they wrote about each other has prompted speculation about a relationship which was more than platonic; while these primary sources do show closeness and positive feelings, there is no concrete evidence to support these claims and their exchange has not been judged as scandalous by their contemporaries.

Rai San’yō further acted as an agent for her poetry, distributing it to friends and colleagues and suggesting publishing her work. He also indicated that she distance her painting technique from the teachings of her late tutor Gyokurin. Ema refused a publication during her lifetime but continued intellectual exchange and travelling to further her art. In 1819, she was introduced to Uragami Shunkin who was proficient in Southern Sung style and agreed to tutor her through correspondence: her paintings began to mature and become more sophisticated, experimenting with different shades of ink which gave her paintings a more spacious look.

=== Later life and maturity ===
Two sides of Ema's life begin to emerge from her late thirties onwards. Living with her well-off family, she had little diversion from her art and practice. Her poems, a wide collection of which is known from the age of 27 until the year of her death often discuss solitude, monotonous daily life and quiet surroundings:

All day, as in any other year, the water clock moves slow.

A fine rain falls continuously, plums ripening.

By the afternoon window I have napped fully in my quiet room.

I am now ready to copy poems of the four female poets.

In addition to an often repetitive daily life, however, Ema was active in literary and intellectual circles as well as travelling often. She was a co-founder of the kanshi-writing groups Hakuō Sha (late 1810s), Reiki Gin Sha (1846), and Kōsai Sha (1848). The groups would meet regularly, discuss kanshi and writing techniques as well as socialise with food and drinks. Ema was elected president for Reiki Gin Sha and Kōsai Sha and rose to prominence and admiration by her fellow poets. Additionally, she often travelled especially in later years, meeting Rai San’yō and other intellectuals. These travels often coincided to celebrate events such as the cherry blossoms, which Ema describes in several of her poems:

White blossoms glow on all the cherry trees.

Remember leaving town, chasing the spring wind?

Fifteen years ago we were drunk here, just as now;

the river murmurs, just as it did then.

In 1828, her step-mother to whom she had maintained a close relationship died, and in 1832, Rai San’yō died from tuberculosis.

Throughout her life, Ema remained close to her father Ema Ransai, who had continued to support her and her education. She wrote several kanshi in his honour. He died in 1839. After the death of the three people closest to her, Ema's work became more sombre and reflective. Some of her work show her as lonely in her old age, once mentioning ‘one mistake’ in her life which some scholars believe to allege to her relationship with Rai San’yō. Further, she discusses how most work written by female poets displays the themes of “loneliness, isolation, and longing for their heartless lovers”. On the other hand, she does diverge from these norms of non-married female poets. Her poems describe her not serving any mother-in-law or father-in-law due to not being married, and divorces herself from the traditional women's three obediences to a father, husband and eldest son. Others state that she did not regret dying childless as long as her art continues to exist. While she did discourage other women to take up art and poetry, her mature poems which she composed in her forties and later show that she perceives age as giving her a kind of freedom, and distinguishes her life from typical womanhood through her education, occupation, single status and age which allows her to disregard traditionally feminine qualities. She also took pride in the work of other female artists of the era: one of her scrolls listed paintings and calligraphy from 22 different women which Ema owned.

=== Last years and death ===
Ema Saikō had grown up in the late Edo period during which Japan was mostly sealed off its surroundings, with little intellectual or artistic exchange between the country and its neighbours. The Japanese were, however, well informed about Western advance into Asia, the Opium Wars in which China was reduced to a semi-colonial status and the West's imperial ambitions. In 1853, U.S. Navy Commodore Matthew Perry sailed to Yokohama in an attempt to open the country to serve U.S. interests. In the following year, he succeeded, resulting in the first trade relations, cultural exchange and foreigners living on Japanese soil in almost three centuries. Ema Saikō and her intellectual associates discussed these developments with interest and . The intellectual elite with which she was associated had formed a close to uniform opinion, viewing the U.S. aggressors as nanban, foreign barbarians without manners or culture who presented an active threat to Japanese lifestyle, culture and political status. Ema's associates as a free-thinking, modern intellectual circle feared Japan to suffer a fate similar to China's, which had experienced a humiliating defeat, decrease in power of its ruler and subjection to foreign commands.

In 1856, she suffered a cerebral hemorrhage which severely affected her health. She produced paintings for the Toda clan and was invited to Ōgaki Castle to be recognized for her work, but suffered a stroke in 1861 and died later that year.

== Painting style: bunjin Ema Saikō ==
Ema Saikō's style of painting evolved throughout her life, influenced by going through different life stages and being taught by different mentors. Her main influence and object is the bamboo plant, which makes up almost all of her painted work. Her adopted first name, Saikō, is an allegory to the plant. Often, her bamboo paintings would incorporate other elements such as sparrows, rocks, or similar characteristics of nature. Temporary assessment states that her paintwork improved after she became a student of Uragami Shunkin in 1819: her style was composed of crisp and controlled brushwork. Bunjinga paintings were usually created in monochrome black ink; Ema began to experiment with this technique, creating bamboo plants with different intensity of ink. This way, she was able to show overlapping leaves while retaining a clear structure and distinction of the separate plants: her paintings created the illusion of space, receding planes and some plants closer to the viewer than others.

== Poetry: kanshi composer Ema Saikō ==
While Ema Saikō was an accomplished painter and began to paint from an early age, modern scholarship pays closer attention to her poetry work. Kanshi are among the shortest poetic forms worldwide: the version used by Japanese poets in the late Edo period contained 20 syllables, distributed into four lines with five characters each – however, strict adherence to rule was not given and some longer kanshi poems exist. Also, in comparison to other Japanese forms of poetry such as the haiku, kanshi are known to diverge in their subject matter. Usually, the four lines of a kanshi are structured to include the beginning, amplification, transition, and conclusion, which Ema Saikō's poetry adheres to, such as in here poem ‘Autumn Night, Impromptu”:

Though I ought to love the moonlight

I fear the harsh cold of the night air.

I call a maid, have all the windows shut:

Flowers in the vase suddenly fragrant.

Ema left more than 1,500 poems upon her death, some of which were written on her art work. As the subject matter was flexible, her poems discuss many and diverging aspects of her life. Some of them reference daily occurrences, a large amount describes observations of nature after the Chinese model. Later, her poetry becomes self-reflective, discussing her age, single status and freedom. Also, many of her poems are dedicated to her relationships and mention her father and her family, Rai San’yō or her first tutor Gyokurin. This is the reason why her collected work is often referenced as somewhat autobiographical. Her description and reflection of her lifestyle, ageing and the people with whom she was associated reveal her personal thoughts; at times, however, they remain unspecific and reserved.

== Legacy ==
Ema was a well-established poet and painter by the time of her death, having been featured in her contemporaries’ publications and leaving behind many works of art. Due to the volume of kanshi art produced in the Edo period and previously as well as the shift of Japanese intellectuals from learning Western languages rather than Classical Chinese, many poets are lost from today's records. Also, female poets tend to have been preserved or appreciated less accurately than their male counterparts. Still, Ema Saikō has been referenced continuously, many details of her life are known and many of her works preserved by her family. The perception of Ema Saikō changed over time: while she was an accomplished artist and poet during her lifetime, modern critics of the 20th century have focused intensively on her relationship to Rai San’yō. Especially critics that consider Rai San’yō's work and life primarily portray Ema as his mistress rather than his associate, student and a poet in her own right. Thus, part of modern scholarship have emphasised her marital status, life style and relationships rather than her paintings and the content of her art. Nevertheless, Ema was ranked as a top female poet by the Chinese poet and scholar Yü Yüeh (1821–1906), who included her poets in an anthology, and she was considered among the “three greatest women poets in Japan” by Tu Fu scholar Kurokawa Yōichi. More recently, scholar Kado Reiko published two volumes of Ema's poems including annotations and commentaries called Ema Saikō Shishū: ”Shōmu Ikō”. Another 150 of her poems were translated into English and published in the 1998 book “Breeze Through Bamboo: Kanshi of Ema Saikō” by Hiroaki Sato.

== Bibliography ==
Ema, Saikō (1998). Sato, Hiroaki (ed.). Breeze Through Bamboo: Kanshi of Ema Saikō. New York: Columbia University Press. ISBN 0-231-11064-2.

Nagase, Mari (2014). "'Truly, They Are a Lady's Words': Ema Saikō and the Construction of an Authentic Voice in Late Edo Period Kanshi". Japanese Language and Literature. 48 (2): 279–305.

Reckert, Stephen (2008). "The Other Latin". Comparative Literature. 60 (1): 58–73. doi:10.1215/-60-1-58.

Sakaki, Atsuko (1999). "Sliding Doors: Women in the Heterosocial Literary Field of Early Modern Japan". U.S.–Japan Women's Journal (17): 3–38.
