= Tetsuzō Tanikawa =

Japanese philosopher

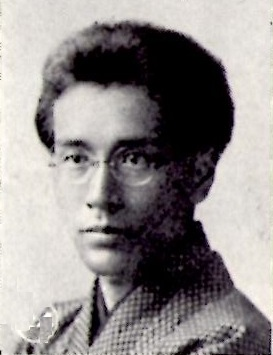
- Born: 26 May 1895; Aichi Prefecture
- Died: 27 September 1989 (aged 94)

Philosophical work
- Era: 20th-century philosophy
- Region: Japanese philosophy
- Main interests: World Government

Tetsuzō Tanikawa (谷川 徹三, Tanikawa Tetsuzō; 26 May 1895 – 27 September 1989) was a Japanese philosopher who promoted the concept of World Government for purposes of peace. He was the father of acclaimed poet Shuntarō Tanikawa.

== Career ==
Tanikawa studied in the Department of Philosophy at the University of Kyoto, where he was one of the students of Kitaro Nishida, the leader of the Kyoto School.

Tanikawa introduced philosophical ideas in Japan through his translations of Georg Simmel and Immanuel Kant. His major philosophical influence was Johann Wolfgang von Goethe. He questioned how world peace could be realized in the face of nuclear proliferation at the beginning of the Cold War.
