= Kaita Murayama =

Japanese writer and artist (1896–1919)

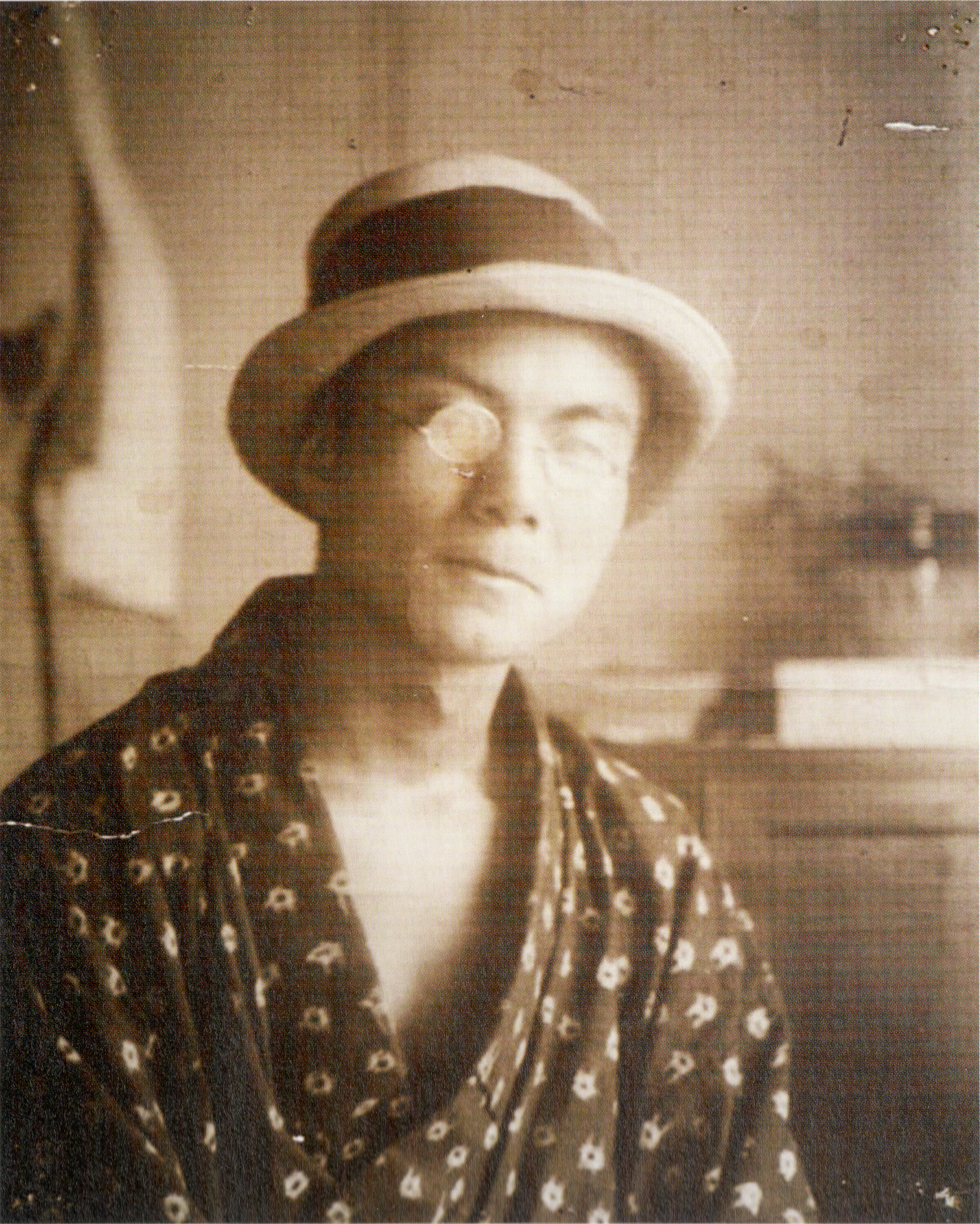
Murayama Kaita in 1918

Kaita Murayama (村山 槐多, Murayama Kaita; September 15, 1896 – February 20, 1919) was a Japanese writer and artist. One of his self-portraits appears in the Mie Prefectural Art Museum in Tsu Mie Prefecture, Japan (not pictured here). He trained at the Fine Arts Academy in Tokyo and was influenced by Western art styles. His work is described as being muscular and robust.
