= Kazuo Kawamura =

Japanese field hockey player

Personal information
- Nationality: Japanese
- Born: 19 January 1947 (age 79) Fukui, Japan

Sport
- Sport: Field hockey
Medal record
Representing Japan
Asian Games
Bronze medal – third place	1970 Bangkok	Team

Kazuo Kawamura (河村一夫, Hepburn: Kawamura Kazuo, born January 19, 1947) is a Japanese field hockey player. He competed in the men's tournament at the 1968 Summer Olympics.

== Biography ==
Born in Fukui Prefecture, Japan, Kawamura graduated from Tenri University. After competing at the 1968 Summer Olympics in Mexico City, he later became a referee with the HJL Hockey Japan League.
