= Chimako Tada =

Japanese poet and writer (1930–2003)

- Born: 1 April 1930; Tokyo, Japan
- Died: 23 January 2003 (aged 72)
- Occupations: Poet, translator, academic
- Writing career
- Period: 1930–2003

Chimako Tada (多田智満子, Tada Chimako; April 1, 1930 – January 23, 2003) was a Japanese poet renowned for her surreal style and evocation of women's experience in post-war Japan. She authored more than 15 books of Japanese poetry, and also translated prose and poetry from French. Tada wrote in traditional styles, such as tanka and haiku, as well as contemporary prose poetry.

== Selected works ==
=== Volumes of poetry ===
- Hanabi (Tokyo: Shoshi Yuriika, 1956)
- Tōgijo (Tokyo: Shoshi Turiika, 1960)
- Bara uchū (Tokyo: Shōshinsha, 1964)
- Kagami no machi arui wa me no mori (Tokyo: Shōshinsha, 1968)
- Nise no nendai ki (Tokyo: Yamanashi Shiruku Sentā, 1971)
- Tada Chimako shishū (Tokyo: Shichōsha, 1972)
- Suien: Tada Chimako kashū (Kōbe: Bukkusu Kobe, 1975)
- Hasu kuibito (Tokyo: Shoshi Ringoya, 1980)
- Kiryō (Tokyo: Chūsekisha, 1983)
- Hafuribi (Tokyo: Ozawa Shoten, 1986)
- Teihon Tada Chimako shishū (Tokyo: Sunagoya Shobō, 1994)
- Kawa no hotori ni (Tokyo: Shoshi Yamada, 1998)
- Nagai kawa no aru kuni (Tokyo: Shoshi Yamada, 2000)
- Kaze no katami (Saitama: Yūhin Bunko, Fukiage-chō, 2003)
- Fū o kiru to (Tokyo: Shoshi Yamada, 2004)
- Yūsei no hito: Tada Chimako kashū (Saitama: Yūshin Bunko, Fukiage-chō, 2005)

=== English translations ===
- Moonstone Woman: Selected Poems and Prose, translated by Robert Brady, Odagawa Kazuko, and Kerstin Vidaeus (Rochester, Michigan: Katydid Books, 1990)
- Forest of Eyes: Selected Poems of Tada Chimako, translated by Jeffrey Angles (Berkeley, CA: University of California Press, 2010)

=== Translations from French into Japanese ===
- Hadorianusu tei no kaisō (Mémoires d’Hadrien) by Marguerite Yourcenar. Tokyo: Hakusuisha, 1964.
- San-Jon Perusu shishū (Poésies de Saint-John Perse) by Saint-John Perse. Tokyo: Shichōsha, 1967.
- Revi-Sutorōsu to no taiwa (Entretiens avec Claude Lévi-Strauss) by Georges Charbonnier. Tokyo: Misuzu Shobō, 1970.
- Hariogabarusu: Mata wa taikan seru anākisuto (Héliogabale, ou, L’anarchiste couronné) by Antonin Artaud. Tokyo: Hakusuisha, 1977.
- Tōhō kitan (Nouvelles orientales) by Marguerite Yourcenar. Tokyo: Hakusuisha, 1980.
- Raion (Le lion) by Joseph Kessel. Tokyo: Nihon Buritanika, 1981.
- Hi (Feux) by Marguerite Yourcenar. Tokyo: Hakusuisha, 1983.
- Tsumibito (Le malfaiteur) by Julien Green. Co-translated with Inoue Saburō. Kyoto: Jinbun Shoin, 1983.
- Piranēji no kuoi nōzui (Le cerveau noir de Piranese) by Marguerite Yourcenar. Tokyo: Hakusuisha, 1985.
