= Hiromi Itō =

Japanese writer

Hiromi Itō 伊藤 比呂美
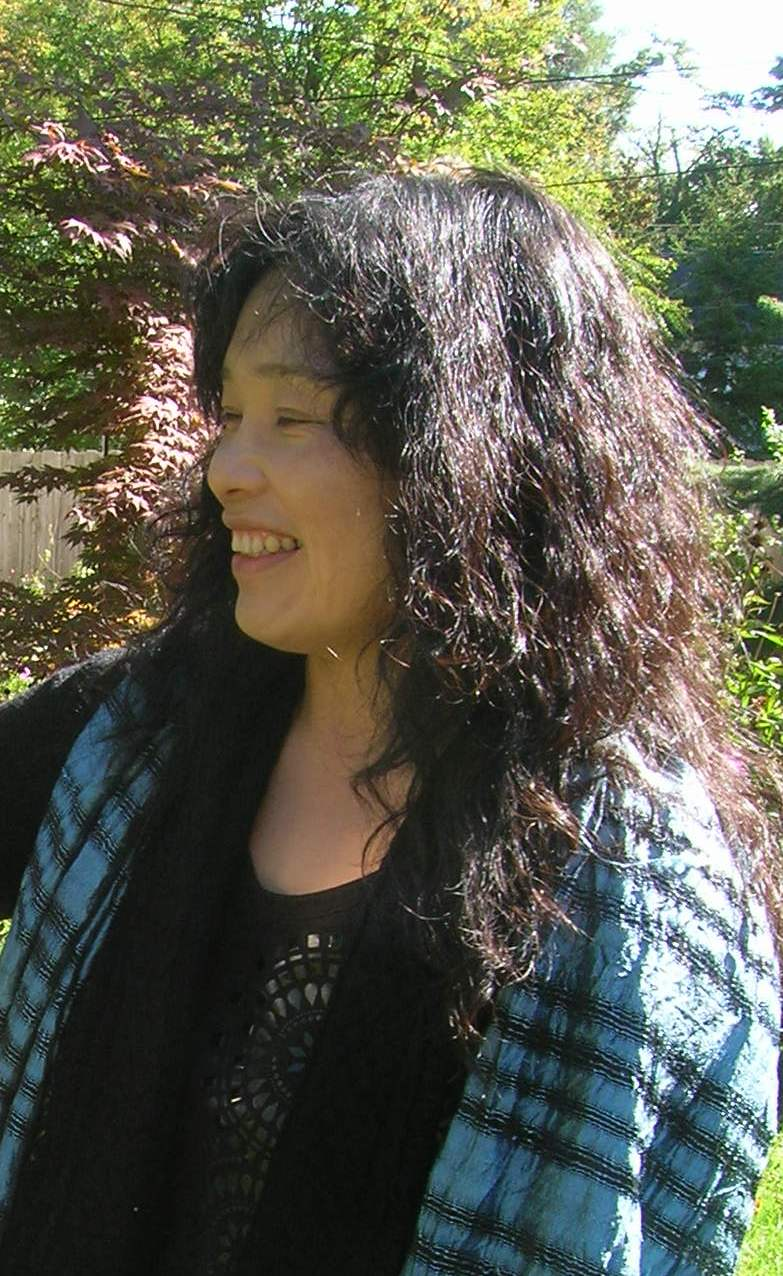
- Itō in 2008
- Born: September 13, 1955 (age 70); Tokyo, Japan
- Occupations: Poet, novelist
- Partner: Harold Cohen
- Writing career
- Period: Modern
- Genre: Poetry

Hiromi Itō (伊藤 比呂美, Itō Hiromi; born September 13, 1955) is a Japanese poet, novelist and essayist. Having won two Akutagawa Prizes and a Mishima Yukio Prize, she is considered one of the most prominent women writers of contemporary Japan. She is currently teaching at School of Culture, Media and Society in Waseda University.

== Biography ==
=== Early career ===
Born in 1955 in Tokyo, Japan, Itō became well known in the 1980s for a series of dramatic collections of poetry that described sexuality, pregnancy, and feminine erotic desire in dramatically direct language. From her earliest work, Itō embarked on a lifelong battle against the stylized and artful language common in 20th-century Japanese poetry. Much of her poetry is narrated in extended passages of relatively colloquial text. Her poems so skillfully represent spoken language that they often give the illusion of being records of spoken speech. Not coincidentally, commentators have often described Itō as a "shamaness" for her ability to channel voices onto the page.

=== Women's issues ===
In 1982, Itō's book Unripe Plums (青梅, Aoume),'appeared in the series "The Present State of Women's Poetry," which was published by the Japanese publisher Shichōsha and also featured a number of rising young female poets, including Toshiko Hirata, Yōko Isaka, and Kōko Shiraishi. In the mid-1980s, Itō's writing gravitated to issues of the feminine body, sexuality, and motherhood, making her the most prominent voice of what came to be known as the "women's poetry boom." The two collections On Territory 1 (テリトリー論1, Teritorī ron 1), published in 1985, and On Territory 2 (テリトリー論2, Teritorī ron 2), published in 1987, describe her feelings after giving birth to her first daughter, Kanoko Nishi. These poems probe the meaning of the mother-child relationship and the demands that motherhood places on the mother's identity and sexuality. For instance, in the often anthologized poem "Killing Kanoko" (カノコ殺し, Kanoko-goroshi), she describes the feelings of a young mother experiencing postpartum depression and anger at her newborn, even though the world is congratulating her on becoming a mother. Her eagerness to explore women's issues has led some to think of her as a feminist writer, although this is a term that Itō has not always embraced in building her public persona.

Throughout her career, however, Itō has embraced the metaphor of the poet as a shamaness. In 1991, she collaborated with the prominent feminist scholar Chizuko Ueno from Tokyo University on a collection of essays and poetry called The Shamaness and Her Interpreter (のろとさにわと, Noro to saniwa to), which the two likened to the collaboration between an Okinawan shamaness and the figure who makes sense of her utterances for the outside world. A few years later in 1993, Itō explicitly played out the metaphor of poet as shamaness in her long narrative poem 'I Am Anjuhimeko' (わたしはあんじゅひめ子である, Watashi wa Anjuhimeko de aru), in which she takes a story recorded from a shamaness in Tsugaru in the early 20th century and refashions it into a dramatic new myth of healing from sexual abuse and self-discovery.

=== Relocation to the US ===
Since at least the 1980s, Itō had been fascinated with Native American poetry, which she first read in Japanese translations. In 1990, she met the American poet Jerome Rothenberg when he visited Japan. Rothenberg had been a major force in re-examining Native American poetry in the movement known as "ethnopoetics," and he encouraged Itō to come to America. She had recently separated from her husband, the literature scholar Masahiko Nishi, and at Rothenberg's invitation, she started making regular, extended trips to America with her children, before eventually settling in 1997 in Encinitas, California with her new partner, the British artist Harold Cohen.

The change of setting led to several significant changes in her writing, in terms of both genre and subject matter. She began writing novellas, both because she was tired of poetry and because she felt prose was better suited to exploring her new experiences as an immigrant. Several of her novellas from this time describe the difficulties of immigration and the experience of being a transplant in a new environment.

=== Since 2000 ===
Itō returned to poetry, publishing several long, fantastic narrative works that blur the lines between prose and poetry. These include Wild Grass on a Riverbank (河原荒草, Kawara arekusa), published in 2005, the narrative Coyote Song (コヨーテ・ソング, Koyōte songu), published in 2007, and The Thorn-Puller: New Tales of the Sugamo Jizō (とげ抜き 新巣鴨地蔵縁起, Toge-nuki: Shin Sugamo Jizō engi), published in 2007. In these works, Itō writes about the experiences of modern people, often migrants or transnationals, but does so in a way that has an almost mythological grandeur and frequently veers into the surreal.

One of Itō's bestsellers was her book of essays The Heart Sutra Explained (読み解き般若心経, Yomitoki Hannnya shingyō), published in 2010. This book consists of a series of personal essays about her involvement with the Buddhist classic, the Heart Sutra, and other Buddhist texts. While relating the texts to her own life, she describes her understanding of the text and provides her own modern Japanese translation from the classical Chinese. Itō's interest in Buddhism and Buddhist texts in particular had been visible earlier in her career, for instance, in the 1993 poem 'I Am Anjuhimeko' (わたしはあんじゅひめ子である, Watashi wa Anjuhimeko de aru), which incorporates elements of folk Buddhist narrative, and the 2004 book Strange Tales from Japan (日本ノ霊異ナ話, Nihon no fushigi na hanashi), which retells several of the stories in the Heian-period Buddhist classic Nihon Ryōiki by the monk Kyōkai. In 2012, Itō published Reading the Lamentations of Divergences Falteringly Out Loud (たどたどしく声に出して読む歎異抄, Tadotadoshiku koe ni dashite yomu tannishō), a book of personal essays and contemporary Japanese translations of correspondence between the Japanese Buddhist monk Shinran and his mother.

A common theme in these books, especially The Heart Sutra Explained, Reading the Lamentations of Divergences Falteringly Out Loud, and the 2014 book A Father's Life (父の生きる, Chichi no ikiru) about the slow decline and death of Itō's father, is the question of how life changes as one grows older and faces death. (This is a major issue in Japan due to the demographic imbalances brought about Japan's declining birth rate and rise in numbers of senior citizens). As a means to understand and cope with this process, Itō frequently turns to Buddhist texts for inspiration.

In addition to these works of poetry and prose, Itō has published numerous books of essays, manga criticism, and translations of American literature for young Japanese readers. Among the books she has translated into Japanese are The Cat in the Hat and Oh, the Places You'll Go! by Dr. Seuss, as well as the two books Out of the Dust and Witness by Karen Hesse. In addition to her modern Japanese translations of the Buddhist texts mentioned above, she has also written a modern Japanese translation of a short story by Ichiyō Higuchi.

Itō divides her time between her home in Encinitas, California and Kumamoto in southern Japan. In the latter, she has been the organizing force between a group of local writers and artists known as the "Kumamoto Band" (熊本文学隊, Kumamoto bungakutai). Itō's work is featured prominently in the Kumamoto Modern Literature Museum.

== Awards ==
- 1978: Gendai Shi Techo Prize for the poetry collection Sky of Plants (草木の空, Sōmoku no sora)
- 1993: Nominated for Mishima Yukio Prize for Art of Family (家族アート, Kazoku āto)
- 1998: Nominated for Akutagawa Prize for the novella House Plant (ハウス・プラント, Hausu puranto)
- 1999: Nominated for Akutagawa Prize for the novella Ranīnya (ラニーニャ, La Niña)
- 1999: Noma Literary Prize for New Writers for the novella Ranīnya (ラニーニャ, La Niña)
- 2006: Takami Jun Prize for the book Wild Grass on a Riverbank (河原荒草, Kawara arekusa)
- 2007: Hagiwara Sakutarō Prize for the novel The Thorn-Puller: New Tales of the Sugamo Jizō (とげ抜き 新巣鴨地蔵縁起, Toge-nuki: Shin Sugamo Jizō engi)
- 2008: Murasaki Shikibu Prize for the novel The Thorn-Puller: New Tales of the Sugamo Jizō (とげ抜き 新巣鴨地蔵縁起, Toge-nuki: Shin Sugamo Jizō engi)

== Bibliography ==
Translations into English

- Itō, Hiromi (2009), Killing Kanoko: Selected Poems of Hiromi Itō, translated by Jeffrey Angles. Notre Dame, IN: Action Books. ISBN 978-0-9799755-4-7.
- Itō, Hiromi (2014), Wild Grass on the Riverbank, translated by Jeffrey Angles. Notre Dame, IN: Action Books.
- Itō, Hiromi (2020), Killing Kanoko / Wild Grass on the Riverbank, translated by Jeffrey Angles. London: Tilted Axis Press. ISBN 9781911284420
- Itō, Hiromi (2022), The Thorn Puller, translated by Jeffrey Angles. Berkeley, CA: Stone Bridge Press. ISBN 978-1737625308.
- Itō, Hiromi (2023), Tree Spirits Grass Spirits, translated by Jon L. Pitt. New York, NY: Nightboat Books. ISBN 978-1643621920.

Translations into German

- Itō, Hiromi (1993), Mutter töten, translated by Irmela Hijiya-Kirschnereit. St. Pölten, Austria: Residenz verlag GmbH. ISBN 978-3-7017-0825-3.
- Itō, Hiromi and Masahiko Nishi (1999), Das anachische Aschenputtel, translated by Richmod Bollinger and Yoriko Yamada-Bochynek. St. Pölten, Austria: Residenz verlag GmbH. ISBN 978-3-7017-1099-7.
- Itō, Hiromi (2021), Dornauszieher. Der fabelhafte Jizo von Sugamo. Roman, translated by Irmela Hijiya-Kirschnereit. Berlin, Germany: Matthes & Seitz Verlag. ISBN 978-3-75180-034-1.

Translations in Anthologies

- Itō, Hiromi in Kikuchi, Rina & Crawford, J. (eds.) (2017), Poet to Poet: Contemporary Women Poets from Japan, translated by Jeffrey Angles. Recent Work Press, Canberra: Australia. ISBN 9780648087847

Secondary Sources

- Angles, Jeffrey, editor (2007). Special issue on Itō Hiromi, U.S.-Japan Women's Journal, vol. 32. ISSN 1059-9770.
- Morton, Leith (2004), Modernism in Practice: An Introduction to Postwar Japanese Poetry. Honolulu: University of Hawai'i Press. ISBN 978-0-8248-2807-3.

== See also ==
- Japanese literature
- Japanese poetry
- Feminism
