= Yoshida family artists =

The Yoshida family of artists is an important line of Japanese artists that reaches unbroken from the early 19th century to the present.

== Overview ==
Just how far back before that their work extended is unclear, but the first artists who appear in recorded history served the Nakatsu clan who lived in Oita Prefecture, on Kyūshū, the southernmost part of the Japanese archipelago. (A Japanese Legacy, 18ff) Late in the century they moved to Tokyo.

Over the past 150 years the ten leading Yoshida artists, extending through four generations, have used a wide variety of media, styles, and techniques. In this way the family embodies an outline of main developments in modern Japanese art history. Within the family there have been five women artists, in three generations, in effect a case study for the emergence of women in public life and artistic leadership in that country.(Allen et al., 152-3) Finally, the Yoshidas represent an interesting example of the way the Japanese people have often used adoption and arranged marriages to reinforce certain desirable traits associated with a family’s name. (Modern Japanese Prints, 167)(Skibbe, Yoshida Toshi, 34)

== Development ==
Their artistic trajectory began modestly.

Prior to the mid-19th century, the Yoshida artists serving the Nakatsu clan presumably provided work in a traditional Japanese style on silk, paper, or board. But then in the Meiji Period, when the structures of Japanese society were changing radically, a young artist by the name of Kasaburo Haruno changed his name to Kasaburo Yoshida (1861–1894) when he married Rui Yoshida and was adopted into her family. (Japanese names here are in the Western order, first the individual name, followed by the family name.) Kasaburo shifted from being a traditional Japanese style artist to becoming a pioneer in early Western style art. Whereas he had been serving the clan, he now became an art teacher in one of the schools established by the clan.(Allen et al., 19-20)

Then, because Kasaburo and Rui at that time had four daughters and no son, they adopted Hiroshi Ueda who became Hiroshi Yoshida (1876–1950) as he joined the family and married one of the daughters, Fujio Yoshida (1887–1987). (A Japanese Legacy, 24, 27) He began with watercolors, but soon became a prize-winning Western-style artist in oils, and late in his career led in a thorough renewal in Japanese woodblock art.(Tadao et al., 178-80)

== The Studio and Toshi ==
The Yoshida Studio was established in 1925. Hiroshi helped Fujio develop into one of the leading modern women artists of the time. (Yoshida Fujio, Foreword)

Their first son, Tōshi Yoshida (1911–1995), was destined to inherit the Yoshida Studio in Tokyo. He slowly moved beyond the quiet romantic style of his father into a brightly illuminated modern realism and abstraction of the mid-20th century in oils, in woodblock printing, and later in the illustration of his children’s books. His wife, Kiso Yoshida (1919–2005), provided a counterpoint with her traditional Japanese works in sand painting (bonseki) and woodblock prints. At the present time, their son Tsukasa Yoshida (1949- ), now director of the Yoshida Hanga Academy, produces surprising modern woodblock prints that blend symbolism and realism. His wife Kiyoko is a performance artist who plays the Celtic harp. (Skibbe, Yoshida Toshi, 43f, 34f, 83) Their daughter, Aya, is a woodblock and mixed media printmaker with a unique, fresh, poetic style of her own. (www.ideagram.co.uk)

== Hodaka's broader interests ==
Parallel to this, Hiroshi and Fujio’s second son Hodaka Yoshida (1926–1995) became an artist entirely independent both of his father’s authority and his aesthetic. The first in the family to focus on abstract art, he began by exhibiting his oils, and then moved to woodblock prints.(Allen et al., 110-11) He was a pioneer in Japan in employing new technologies and techniques, like copper-etching, lithograph, and silkscreen, often with photo-transfer methods, and always in combination with woodblocks. In addition, he gained recognition in the areas of avant-garde poetry, photography, sculpture from various materials, and ceramics. Prints, however, remained his main passion.(Allen et al., 114) He was highly regarded in the world of international biennials, received many prizes, and was awarded two distinguished medals for his art by the Emperor.(Allen et al., 112) (A Japanese Legacy, 112) Hodaka’s wife Chizuko Yoshida (1924-2017), also a nationally and internationally recognized artist, added to the range of modern abstract art in the family.(Allen et al., 178f) That trajectory reached its highest point in the work of their daughter, Ayomi Yoshida (1958- ), who has created distinctly postmodern works, both in the woodblock medium and in large-room installations.(Allen et al., 196-7) Her husband, Bidou Yamaguchi, is a Noh mask carver in the Hosho Noh tradition.

Viewed in the context of Japan’s rich history of art, the Yoshida family is notable for having created such a sustained, and diverse range of fine art that combines the best Japanese aesthetic instincts with a clear modern international appeal. (Andon 1996, 12)

== Sources ==
- Blair, “Dorothy Blair: Hiroshi Yoshida, 1876-1950” in Artibus Asiae, Vol. 14, Nos. 1-2, 1951, p. 168;
- Skibbe, “The American Travels of Hiroshi Yoshida,” in Andon, Vol. 11/3, No. 3, 1993;
- Skibbe, “Toshi Yoshida 1911-1995: Diversity, Change, and Continuity in the Yoshida Art Tradition,” Andon, No. 53, March 1996;
- Statler, Modern Japanese Prints, Tuttle, 1959;
- Tadao, et al., The Complete Woodblock Prints of Yoshida Hiroshi, Abe Publishing, 1987.
- Yamamura, Yoshida Fujio: Painter of Radiance, Fuchu Art Museum, 2002.
- Yamamura. Yoshida Toshi: Nature, Art, and Peace, Seascape, 1996.
- Yasunaga, Koichi Yasunaga, former Director of the Fukuoka City Art Museum, Fukuoka, Japan. Some of his recent research is available in Allen, et al., A Japanese Legacy: Four Generations of Yoshida Family Artists, an exhibition catalogue produced by Matthew Welch, Curator for Japanese and Korean Art, at the Minneapolis Institute of Arts, in 2002.
