= Rui Yoshida =

Rui Yoshida (1864–1954) was a daughter born to a family of Japanese artists five generations ago. Through those five generations, the Yoshida artists evolved from using a traditional Japanese style to producing modern Western-style art, and finally to post-modernism. Although not an artist herself, Rui was the key figure who nurtured and shaped those who did become artists.

== Early family history ==
When Rui was born in the mid-19th century, the Yoshida family was making traditional paintings for the Nakatsu warrior clan in what is now Ōita Prefecture on the island of Kyūshū. However, no males were born into the family to carry on the Yoshida name and work. As was often done in Japan at the time, a family without a male heir would adopt a male from another family. Rui’s parents selected a young man, Kasaburō Haruno (1861–1894), whose father was also a painter for the Nakatsu clan, to be their adopted son and to marry Rui. Kasaburō had been trained by early Western-style artists in Kyoto in their use of sketch, watercolors, and oils. Later he became an art teacher at Shūyūkan Junior High School in Fukuoka. There he became a pioneer in the Western-style by starting an art club and by writing two manuals on learning to paint with Western-style oils.

Because Kasaburō's health was declining and because Rui had as yet not borne a son, they decided to adopt a male from another family, just as Rui’s parents had done. Kasaburō’s most promising art student was Hiroshi Ueda (1876–1950). In 1891 they adopted him. Hiroshi Yoshida was immediately sent to study with leading Western-style artists in Kyoto. Kasaburō died at the age of 33, just three years after Hiroshi was adopted. That meant that the 18-year-old Hiroshi, with Rui his adoptive mother, became the head of the Yoshida family with its five children.

In the same year that Kasaburō died, Hiroshi and Rui took the family to Tokyo where he could study with even more important artists. During those difficult times, Rui, who had been instrumental with her husband in choosing Hiroshi, now assisted and guided him. For example, she ground pigments by hand, mixed them with oil, and put them into tubes for Hiroshi to use in painting. (Skibbe, 36-7) At that time, as well as later, Rui was the strength and continuity behind the emerging artists.

== New leadership ==
In 1907 Hiroshi married his own adoptive sister Fujio Yoshida (1887–1987), the sister who had shown the most talent in art. (For a photo of the Yoshida family at time of the wedding, see Yasunaga, 172) He had actually tutored her in art before they married, and that continued. Much of what Fujio did at this young age had reflected Hiroshi’s style. But as time went on, the talent Hiroshi had initially seen in Fujio's work began to reveal her independent insight and aesthetic. A large exhibit of Fujio’s work in 2002 at the Fuchu Museum near Tokyo showed that. That was one reason why joint exhibits of Fujio’s and Hiroshi’s watercolors in the United States in the early 20th century were so popular with the American art public and resulted so many sales.

== Rui in difficult times ==
Fujio’s first child, daughter Chisato, was born in 1908. A son, Tōshi Yoshida (1911–1995), followed in 1911. Two months after this, Chisato died, and within a year Toshi contracted infantile paralysis. Both children had been placed in the care of servants while Fujio yielded to Hiroshi’s demands that she advance her career.

After tragedy struck both of her children, Fujio blamed herself, fell into prolonged grief, and ceased painting for almost ten years. During that time Rui took care of her, and the disabled Toshi, and the household. Rui read to her young grandson in bed and told him stories. Later, when Hiroshi and Fujio went on another tour through the United States in 1923-1925, Rui and Toshi stayed with Rui’s belatedly borne son, Masao, who was now a university professor. During this time of caring for Tōshi, she encouraged him to learn how to sketch animals, because that subject-matter would clearly differentiate his art from that of his father. A few years later, the first woodblock prints he made were of animals. (Skibbe, 37) Hiroshi's and Fujio's other son, Hodaka Yoshida (1926–1995), also became an artist, quite independently and entirely different from his father.

Toshi was the designated heir of the Yoshida tradition. His father, however, continued to be just as demanding of him as he had been of Fujio. After a grueling sketching and painting trip to India and the far East, Hiroshi and the 19-year-old Tōshi returned home, with Tōshi extremely tired and depressed. Once again, Rui took over. When the father forbade Toshi to listen to the radio, Rui provided Western novels and music for him and nursed him back to health. In later years, Tōshi was unequivocal. It was not his father or his mother, but his grandmother Rui, who was most instrumental in his becoming an artist. (Skibbe, 39) In Tōshi’s first large woodblock print, his first print after World War II, he portrayed the interior of a Buddhist temple; to one side is an old bent-over woman wearing glasses and walking with a cane. It was his homage to Rui. Rui actually outlived Hiroshi, her adopted son, dying in 1954 at the age of 90. (Skibbe, 48)

Toshi was right about Rui’s importance, not only because of her profound influence on himself as an artist, but also because she was a force for stability and inspiration for the whole family during crucial times in its history. The larger story of the Yoshida family shows clearly how the Japanese often enhanced certain desirable traits in their families, in a sense inserting desirable genes by means of adoption and arranged marriage. Beyond this, Rui by strength of character guided and nurtured individuals in her family to the fourth generation, enhancing her family’s depth and diversity of artistic talent. Because of this, the Yoshida family artists exemplify key developments in modern Japanese art history, leading into post-modernism in the work of Hodaka's and Chizuko Yoshida's daughter, Ayomi Yoshida.

== Bibliography ==
- Yasunaga, ed., Hiroshi Yoshida Exhibition, A Master of Modern Landscape Painting - Refreshingly Original and Lyrical, Fukuoka Art Museum and Kawaguchiko Museum of Art, 1996, Japanese (Koichi Yasunaga is the leader in research on Yoshida family history)
- Skibbe, “The American Travels of Hiroshi Yoshida,” in Andon, 57-74
- Skibbe, Yoshida Toshi: Nature, Art, and Peace, Seascape, 1996
