= Fujio Yoshida =

20th century female Japanese artist

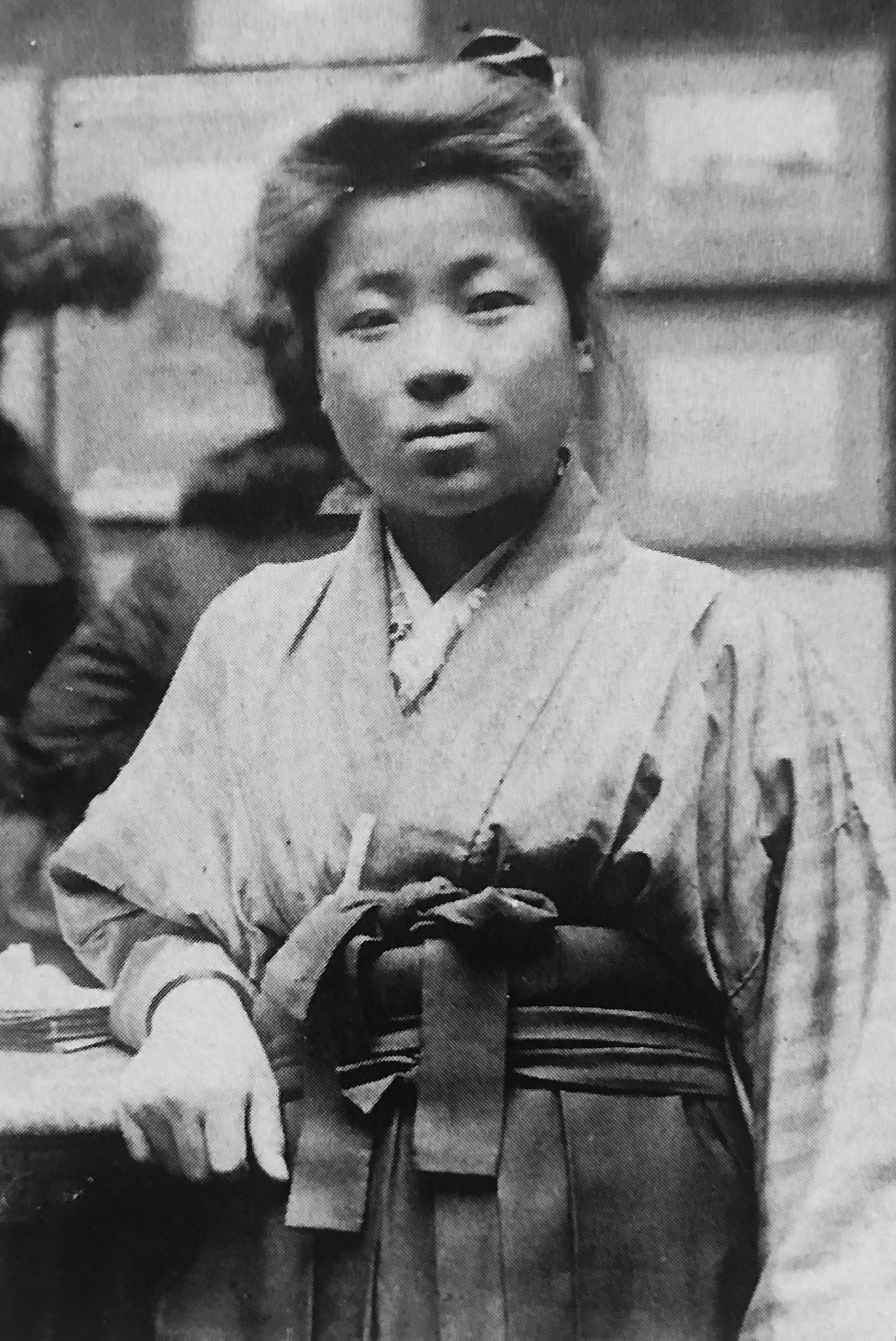
- Born: October 5, 1887
- Died: May 1, 1987 (aged 99)
- Occupation: Artist
- Known for: First woman artist in Yoshida family artists.

Fujio Yoshida (吉田 ふじを, Yoshida Fujio; October 5, 1887 – May 1, 1987) was a Japanese artist. She was the first female artist among the Yoshida family artists.

== Early life and education ==
Fujio Yoshida was the daughter of Rui Yoshida and Kasaburo Yoshida, a Western style Japanese artist. Trained from an early age in the Western-style known as yō-ga, she went on to create both naturalistic and abstract watercolors, oils, and woodblock prints. Her paintings of enlarged flower parts are sometimes, and perhaps incorrectly, associated with Georgia O'Keeffe’s work.

Her parents had a family of four girls, but to begin with no son was born to carry on Kasaburo's work as a Western-style artist. It was expected that a male heir was needed to carry on the family artistic tradition. As a result, Kasaburo adopted his most talented male student, Hiroshi Ueda, who then became known as Hiroshi Yoshida. A few years later a son was born, but Hiroshi was so favoured by his adoptive father that he retained his status as first son. After Kasaburo died, Hiroshi enrolled his adopted sister Fujio in some of the best Western-style studios in Tokyo.

== Career ==
Catalogue from Exhibition of paintings- American landscape and Japanese landscape in oil and water colours by Mr. Hiroshi Yoshida and Miss Fuji Yoshida.

Fujio and Hiroshi travelled together to the United States in 1903–1905. They held their first joint exhibition in Providence, Rhode Island. Only 16 years old, Fujio was an instant American art world phenomenon, admired for her beauty and exotic kimono, but even more so for her graceful watercolor scenes of Japan. Shows in other East Coast cities followed. She sold almost as many pieces as Hiroshi on that trip and on subsequent trips in 1907 and 1923–1925. Each trip included travel around the world on the way back to Tokyo.

Fujio then entered the initial Japan Fine Arts Exhibition, in 1910 she received an award for Spirit Grove. She exhibited with Taiheiyō-Gakai and helped establish the Shuyōkai (Vermilion Leaf Society), the art society for women.

From 1911 until the 1920s, Fujio stopped painting due to family tragedy. When she returned to art, she developed a new approach and began to specialise in flower paintings and still lifes in watercolour. She also experimented with oils and engraving.

In 1949 she began to create abstract flower paintings in bright colours in oils, watercolours, and in 1953 in woodblock prints. She turned to this more abstract, sensual style at the age of 62, influenced by her son Hodaka. She put flower heads indigenous to Japan into fish bowls to enlarge them and painted or engraved the magnified results. It is thought that she was influenced by her son Hodaka's abstract art.

Fujio published her autobiography, Shuyō no ki (Vermilion Leaf Record), in 1978. In 1980 she held her first solo exhibition in Tokyo.

== Personal life ==
Fujio married Hiroshi Yoshida in 1907. Fujio's first-born child, daughter Chisato, was born in 1908 but died in 1911 shortly after the birth of her first son, Tōshi Yoshida. Within a year he had contracted polio, leaving him partially paralyzed. Overcome with grief, Fujio stopped painting for almost 10 years. Her mother, artist Rui Yoshida lived with the family and took care of much of the domestic duties during this time. A second son, Hodaka Yoshida, was born in 1926. Both sons became artists and their maternal grandmother Rui was a formative influence on her grandsons' artistic careers.

After her husband Hiroshi died in 1950, Fujio lived first with Tōshi's family and then with Hodaka's family.

Fujio died peacefully in Hodaka's home in 1987, months short of her 100th birthday.

== Legacy ==
A large and scholarly exhibit of her work was mounted by the Fuchu Art Museum near Tokyo in 2002, where her treatment of light was seen as clearly differentiating her work from her husband's. The Minneapolis Institute of Arts featured her work in its 2002 exhibition and catalogue, A Japanese Legacy: Four Generations of Yoshida Family Artists. In 2003, Fukuoka Art Museum held the first major retrospective of her work, showing 130 of her paintings in an exhibition entitled Fujio Yoshida: A Painter of Radiance.

The Yoshida Family: Three Generations of Japanese Print Artist was held at the Art Institute of Chicago in 2018. Her works were shown for the first time in the UK at the Dulwich Picture Gallery in Yoshida: Three Generations of Japanese Printmaking 19 June to 3 November 2024.

Her works are held in a number of institutions, including the Art Institute of Chicago, Cincinnati Art Museum, Minneapolis Institute of Arts, Toledo Museum of Art, Tokyo National Museum, Fukuoka Art Museum, Los Angeles County Museum of Art and Museum of Modern Art, Tokyo.

== Sources ==
- Fujio Yoshida, Shuyō no ki, Taiyō Publishing Co., Tokyo, 1978
- Yoshida Fujio: A Painter of Radiance, Fuchu Art Museum, 2002
