= Hiroshi Yoshida =

Japanese artist (1876–1950)

- 吉田博
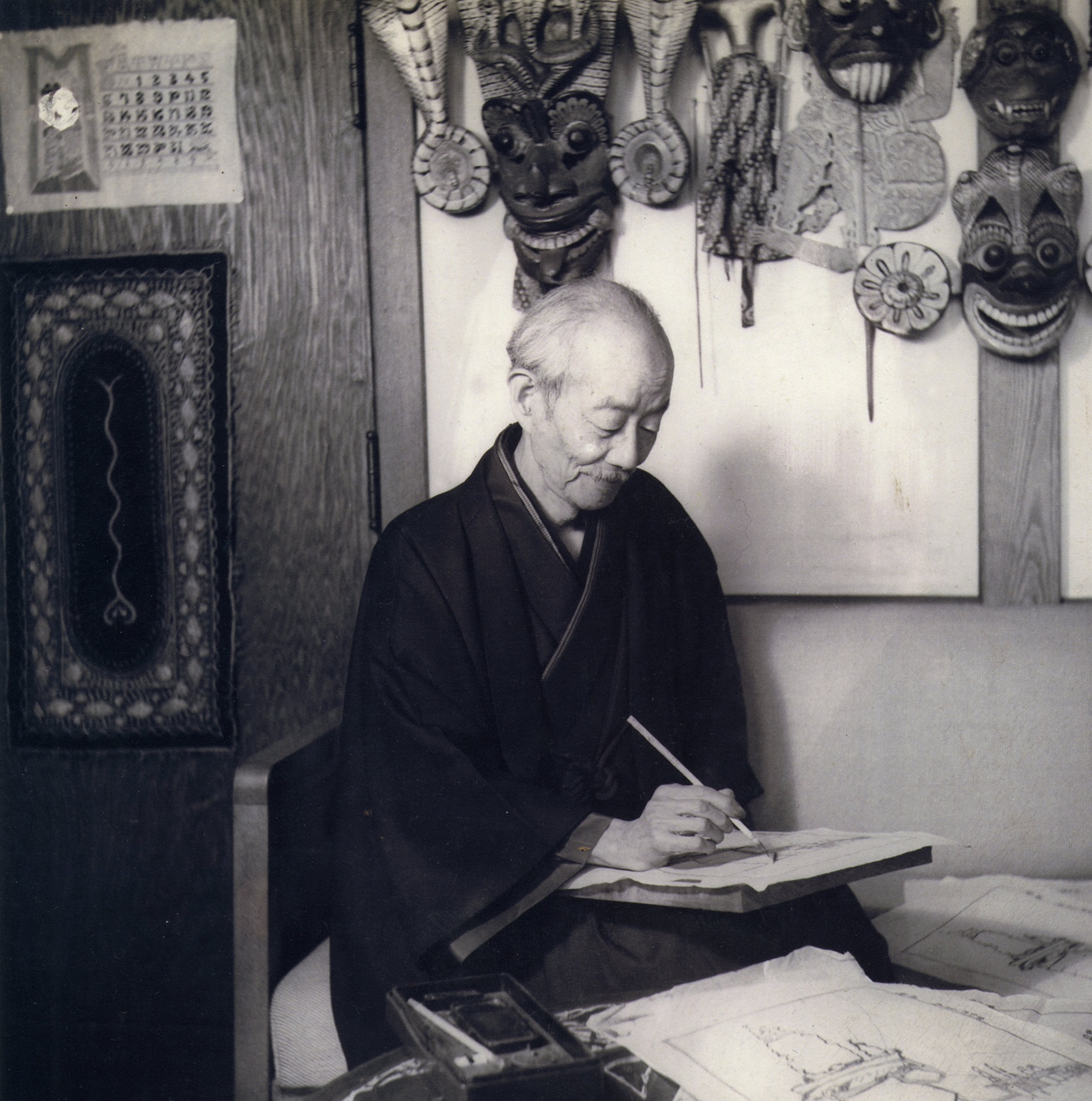
- Portrait of Hiroshi Yoshida, 1949
- Born: September 19, 1876; Kurume, Fukuoka, Japan
- Died: April 5, 1950 (aged 73)
- Movement: Shin-hanga

Hiroshi Yoshida (吉田 博, Yoshida Hiroshi; September 19, 1876 – April 5, 1950) was a 20th-century Japanese painter and woodblock printmaker. Along with Hasui Kawase, he is regarded as one of the greatest artists of the shin-hanga style, and is noted especially for his landscape prints. Yoshida made numerous trips around the world, with the aim of getting to know different artistic expressions and making works of different landscapes. He traveled widely, and was particularly known for his images of non-Japanese subjects done in traditional Japanese woodblock style, including the Taj Mahal, the Swiss Alps, the Grand Canyon, and other National Parks in the United States.

He was known as a mountain painter (山岳画家) in Japan and spent about half of the year on sketching travels. He was particularly fond of mountain landscapes and painted many of them, founding the Nihon Sangakugaka Kyōkai (Japan Mountain Painting Society, 日本山岳画家協会) in his later years. As a mountaineer, he climbed the mountains of the Japanese Alps every summer and created his large paintings and woodblock prints after returning home.

== Biography ==
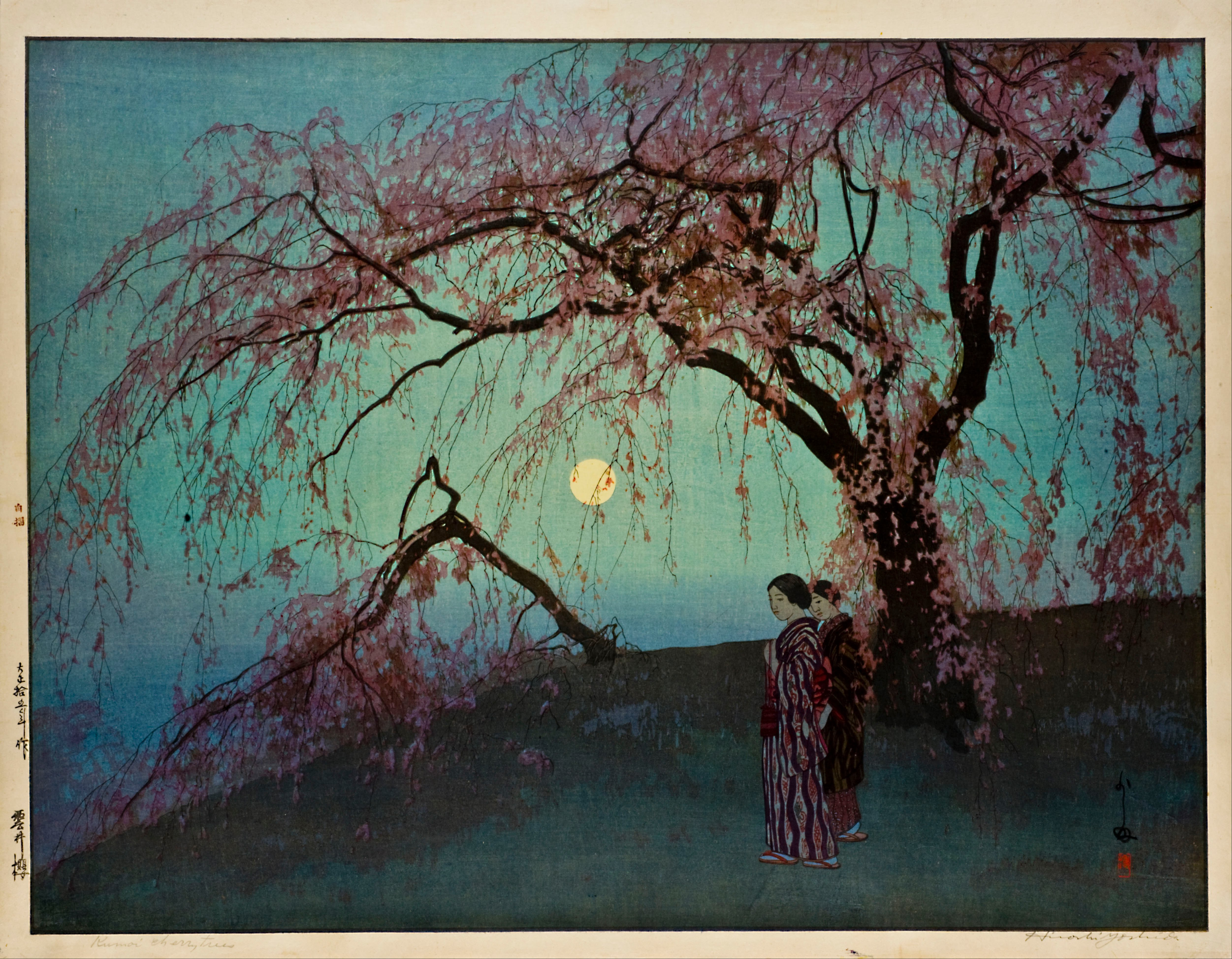
Kumoi Cherry Trees, 1920

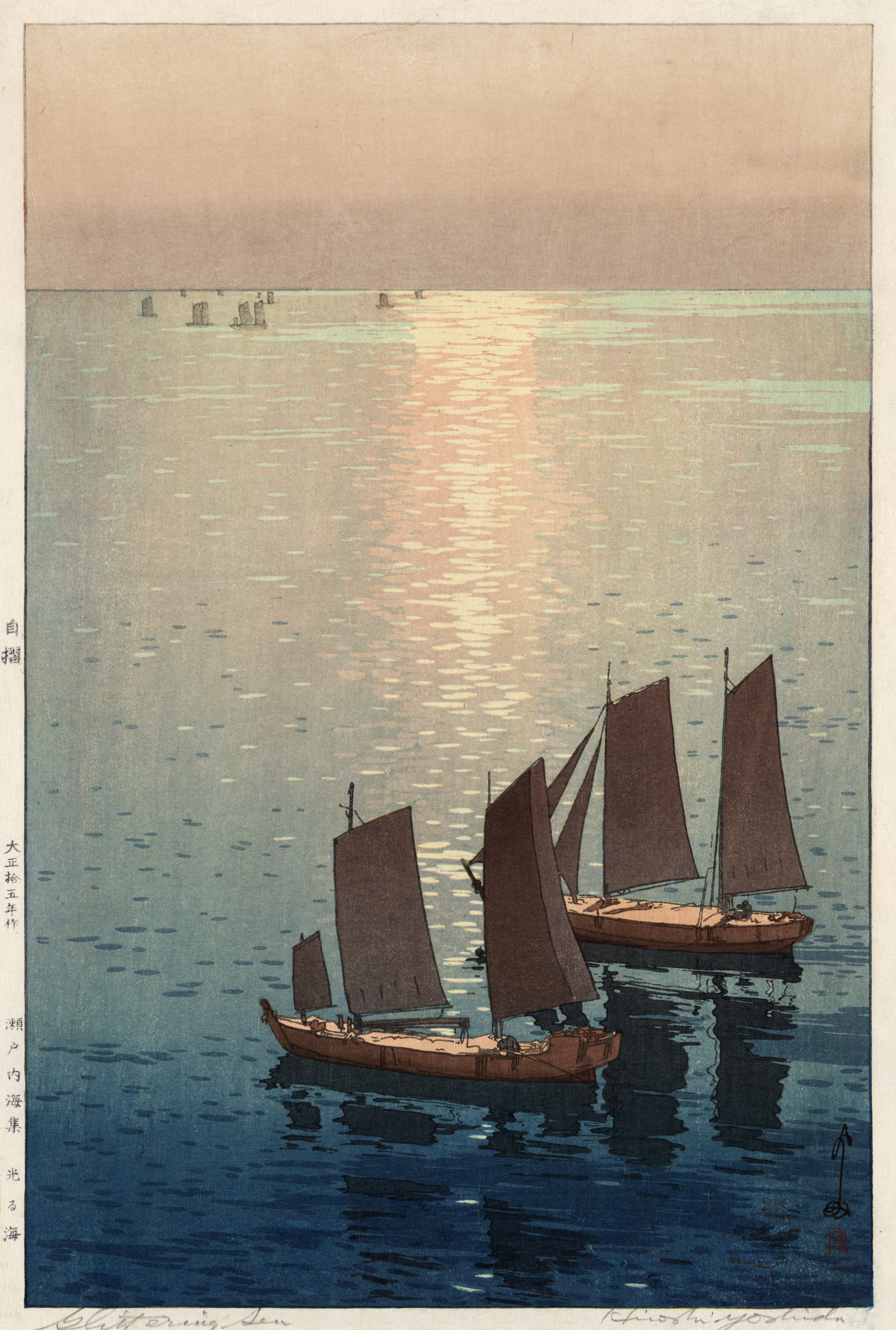
Glittering Sea, 1926. From the series Seto Inland Sea

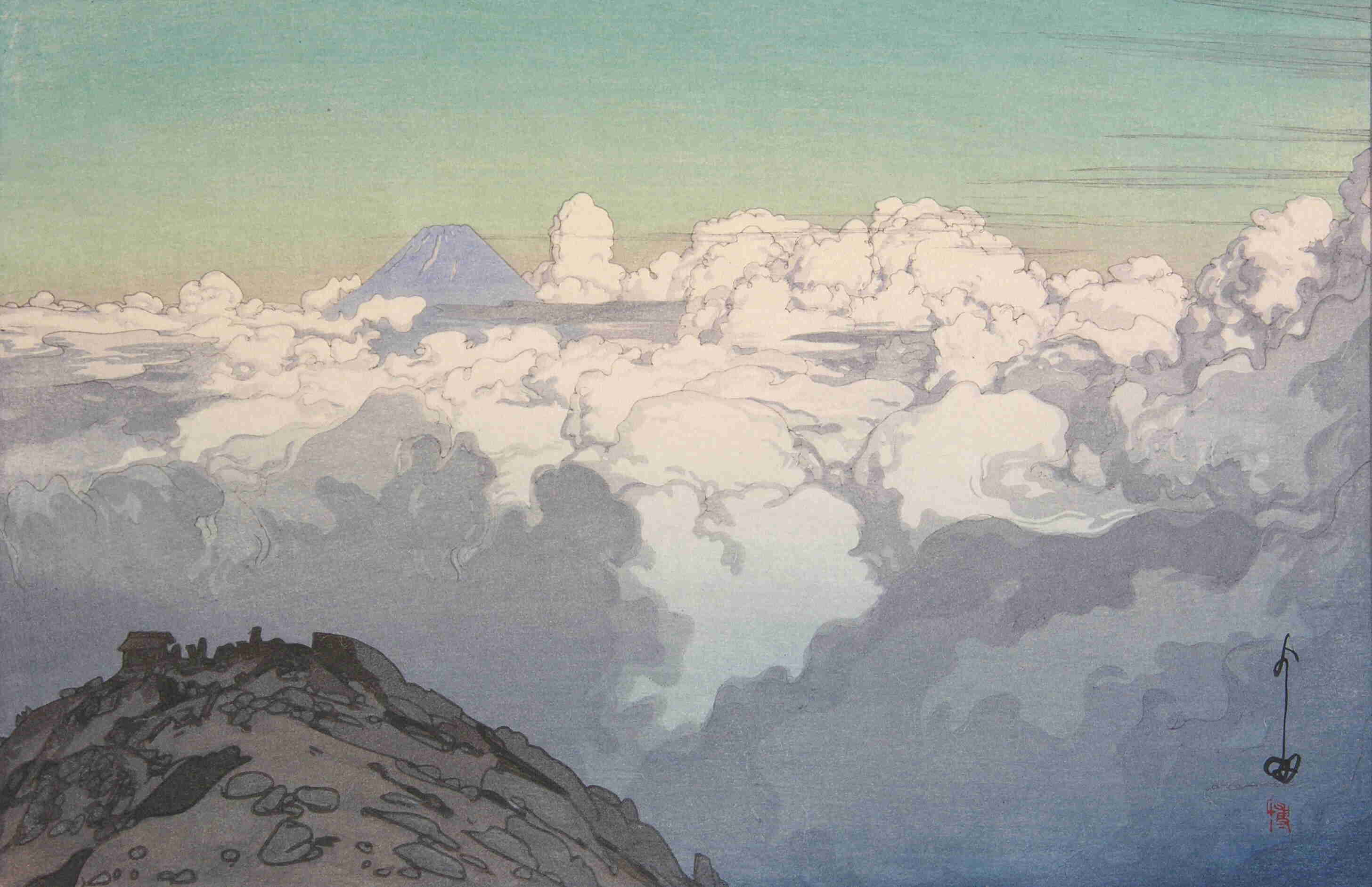
View from Komagatake, 1928. From the series Southern Japan Alps

Hiroshi Yoshida (born Hiroshi Ueda) was born in the city of Kurume, Fukuoka, in Kyushu, on September 19, 1876. His father, Ueda Tsukane, taught painting in public schools and came from a samurai family; Hiroshi showed an early gift for art that his father encouraged. At the age of 15, he was adopted by the Yoshida family after his talent for painting was discovered by Kasaburo Yoshida, a junior high school art teacher, and studied with the Kyoto yōga-ka (Western-style painters) Tamura Sōryū and Miyake Kokki. He moved to Tokyo at the age of 17 and entered the Fudōsha (不同舎), a painting school sponsored by the yōga-ka Koyama Shōtarō, and became a member of the Meiji Bijutsukai (Meiji Art Society, 明治美術会), the first Western-style art organization in Japan.

In 1899, Yoshida had his first American exhibition at the Detroit Museum of Art (now the Detroit Institute of Art). In 1900 he had an exhibition with Hachiro Nakagawa at the Museum of Fine Arts, Boston. He then traveled to Washington, D.C., Providence, France, Great Britain, Germany, and Italy. He exhibited his work at the Paris Exposition of 1900, for which he received a commendation, and after coming to the United States in 1903, he exhibited his work at the St. Louis World's Fair of 1904, for which he received a bronze medal. Around this time, Yoshida and his fellow painters founded the Taiheiyōgakai (Pacific Art Society, 太平洋画会) the successor to the Meiji Bijutsukai.

Between 1903 and 1907 Yoshida travelled again to the United States, Europe and North Africa together with his stepsister and fellow painter Fujio, whom he married on their return to Japan. Until 1920 he built a successful career as an oil and watercolor painter working in the light, airy style he had absorbed in the West, though his independent temperament repeatedly put him at odds with Japan's official art establishment.

In 1920, at the age of 44, Yoshida presented his first woodcut at the Watanabe Print Workshop, organized by Shōzaburō Watanabe (1885–1962), publisher and advocate of the shin-hanga movement. His first work was a print depicting the Meiji Shrine. In 1921, he produced seven prints, including a series of sailing ships. However, Yoshida's collaboration with Watanabe was short partly due to Watanabe's shop burning down because of the Great Kanto earthquake on September 1, 1923.

Following the example of Goyō Hashiguchi, Yoshida subsequently decided to become independent, founding his own studio in 1925 and personally selecting the artisans whose work he would closely supervise. Despite the interruption of their collaboration, in 1924 Watanabe, aware that Yoshida was travelling to the United States to sell his work, asked him to include some of his own shin-hanga prints in his catalogue; these new prints proved so successful overseas that the publisher decided to concentrate his efforts abroad.

Despite the break, in 1924 Watanabe asked Yoshida, who was about to travel to the United States to sell his own work, to include some of Watanabe's shin-hanga prints in his catalogue there; the prints sold so well abroad that Watanabe subsequently focused his efforts on the American market. Yoshida later organized, together with the museum directors J. Arthur MacLean and his former student Dorothy Lillian Blair, two exhibitions of shin-hanga at the Toledo Museum of Art in Ohio, in 1930 and 1936, the first major exhibitions abroad devoted exclusively to the new prints, and a turning point in their commercial success, since visitors on the touring show could order prints through Yoshida, who would in turn contact Watanabe.

In 1923, Yoshida made a third travel to the U.S. to sell the few works left after the earthquake. His prints were well received in the U.S. and he held exhibitions all over the country from his base in Boston. His travel to the United States made him aware of the high reputation of Japanese woodblock prints and he set out to create new woodblock prints that would combine the traditional Japanese technique of ukiyo-e with the realistic expression of yōga (Western-style painting).

In 1925, he hired a group of professional carvers and printers, and established his own studio. Prints were made under his close supervision. The first seventeen prints issued by his new studio all depicted non-Japanese subjects, and throughout his career Yoshida continued to produce both Japanese and foreign scenes in a picturesque and highly popular style. Yoshida combined the ukiyo-e collaborative system with the sōsaku-hanga principle of "artist's prints", and formed a third school, separating himself from the shin-hanga and sōsaku-hanga movement.

In 1925, he started the series Europe and the series The United States and published works like The Grand Canyon. In 1926, he published 41 prints, the year in which he produced the most prints in his life. In that year, he started the series Seto Inland Sea, of which Glittering Sea was published in the same year. He also published the series Twelve Scenes in the Japan Alps and three prints from the series Ten Views of Mount Fuji in the same year. In 1928, he published the series Southern Japan Alps and the remaining seven works from the series Ten Views of Mount Fuji.

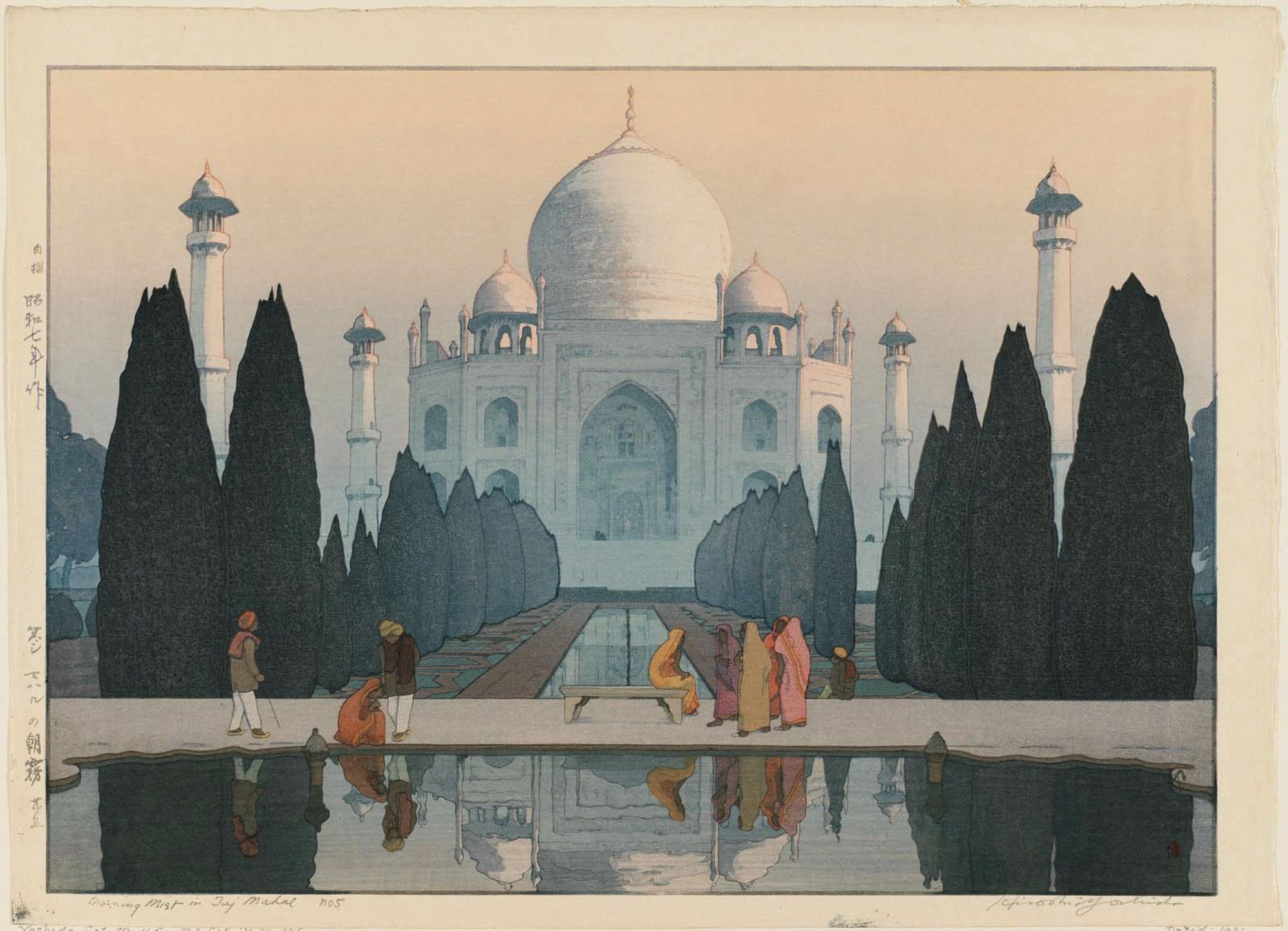
Morning Mist in Taj Mahal, no. 5, 1932

From November 1930 to February 1931, Yoshida and his eldest son, Tōshi, went on a sketching trip to India and Southeast Asia. It was his fourth travel abroad. He became so absorbed in sketching that after a full day of painting at one destination, he would take an overnight train to the next destination and sleep in the sleeping car. He chose a season when he could see the sunrise at Kanchenjunga under clear skies, and he checked the phases of the moon so that he could sketch the Taj Mahal on a full moon night. As a result of this sketching travel, he produced 32 prints in the India and Southeast Asia series. These included depictions of Indian landscapes, such as his 1931 woodblock print Ghat in Benaras (Benaresu no gatto).

In 1938 Yoshida made the first of three trips to China as an official war artist.

At the age of 73, Yoshida took his last sketching trip to Izu and Nagaoka and painted his last works The Sea of Western Izu and The Mountains of Izu. He became sick on the trip and returned to Tokyo where he died on April 5, 1950, at his home. From 1930 until his death in 1950 he produced about 250 woodblock prints. His tomb is in the grounds of the Ryuun-in, in Koishikawa, Tokyo.

== Artistic style ==
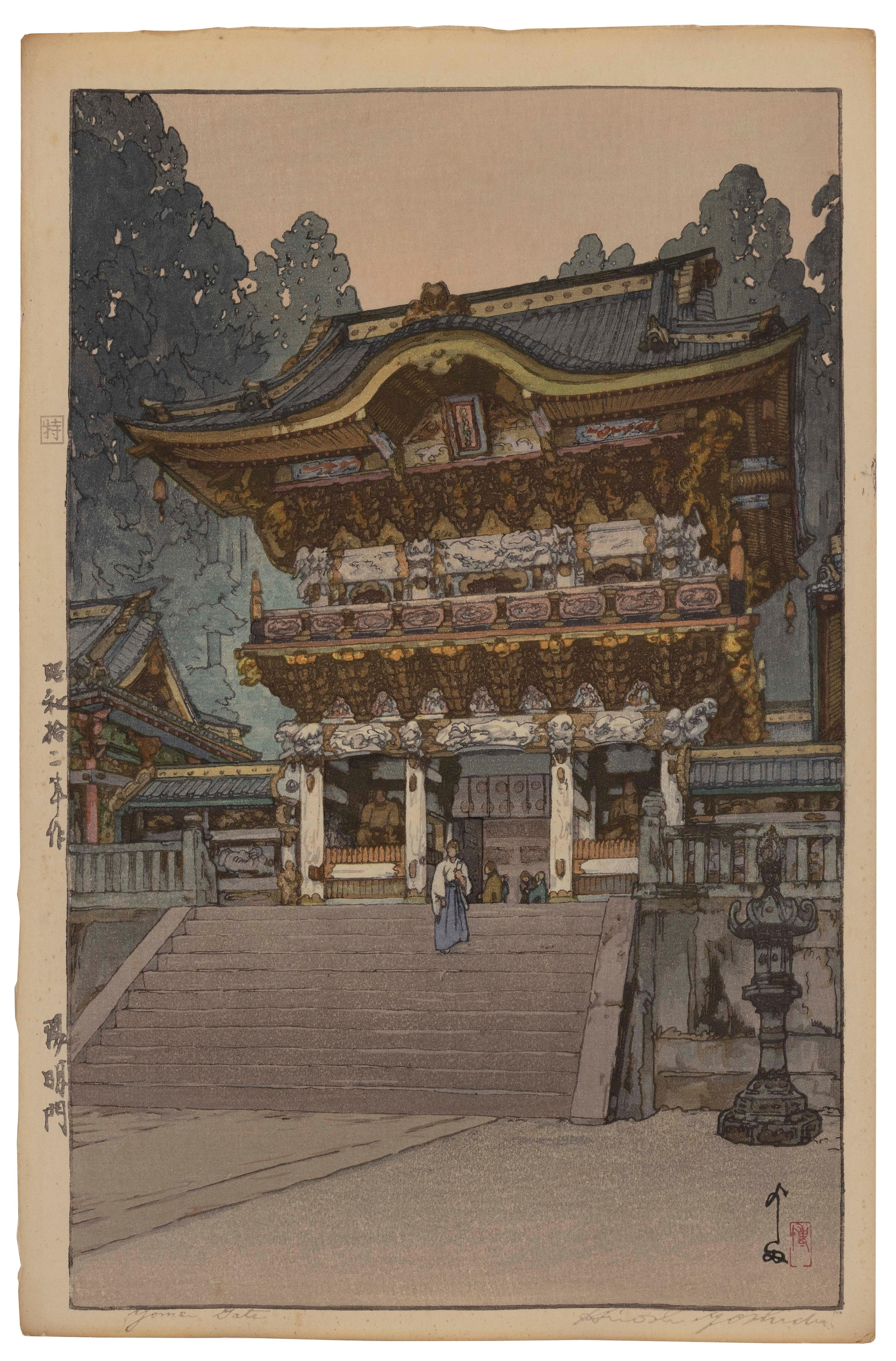
Yōmeimon, 1937

Throughout his life, Yoshida was a leading figure in the Japanese art world of his time in the fields of woodblock prints, watercolors and oil paintings.

During a visit to the United States in 1923, he became aware of the high esteem in which Japanese woodblock prints were held and set out to create a new style of woodblock prints that combined the traditional Japanese technique of ukiyo-e with the realistic expression of yōga (Western-style painting). He borrowed the brush strokes of oil painting and the color expression of watercolor from yōga techniques and integrated them with traditional ukiyo-e techniques.

The style of ukiyo-e, one of the distinctive features of Yoshida's artistic work, emerged in Japan around the 15th century, which consists of the application of paint on a block of wood. The usual theme represented in this painting were Kabuki theatre, natural landscapes, socialites, or everyday scenes. For many years the ukiyo-e style was the truest representation of what art meant in Japan.

His prints are characterized by an unprecedented layering of colors through multiple prints, with an average of 30 prints and often close to 100 prints. As a result, his works are rich in color and faithfully depict the atmosphere of landscapes and even the three-dimensionality of architecture. For example, Yōmeimon in 1937 was printed 96 times and Kameido in 1927 was printed 88 times to complete the work.

He used the same block to print different color combinations to express the changes of time and weather on the same piece. This production method is called betsuzuri (別摺り, separate printing). A representative example of this method are the six works he made in 1926 depicting sailing boats. They are part of the Seto Inland Sea series and each depicts a morning, forenoon, afternoon, evening, night and mist scene of the same sailing boats. In his six prints of the Taj Mahal published in 1932, the fifth and sixth are in the betsuzuri method, each depicting a morning and a night scene.

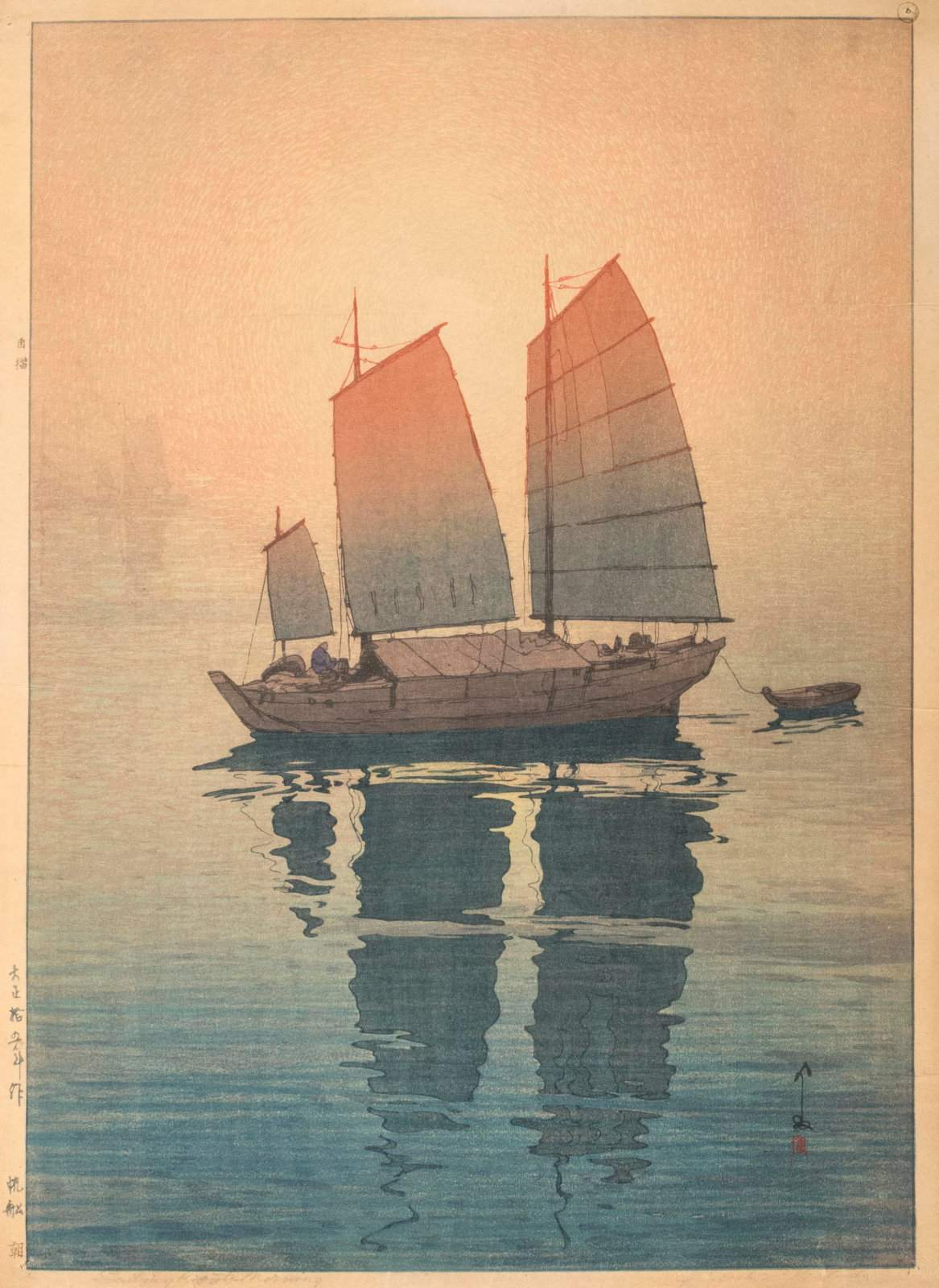
Sailing Boats, Morning

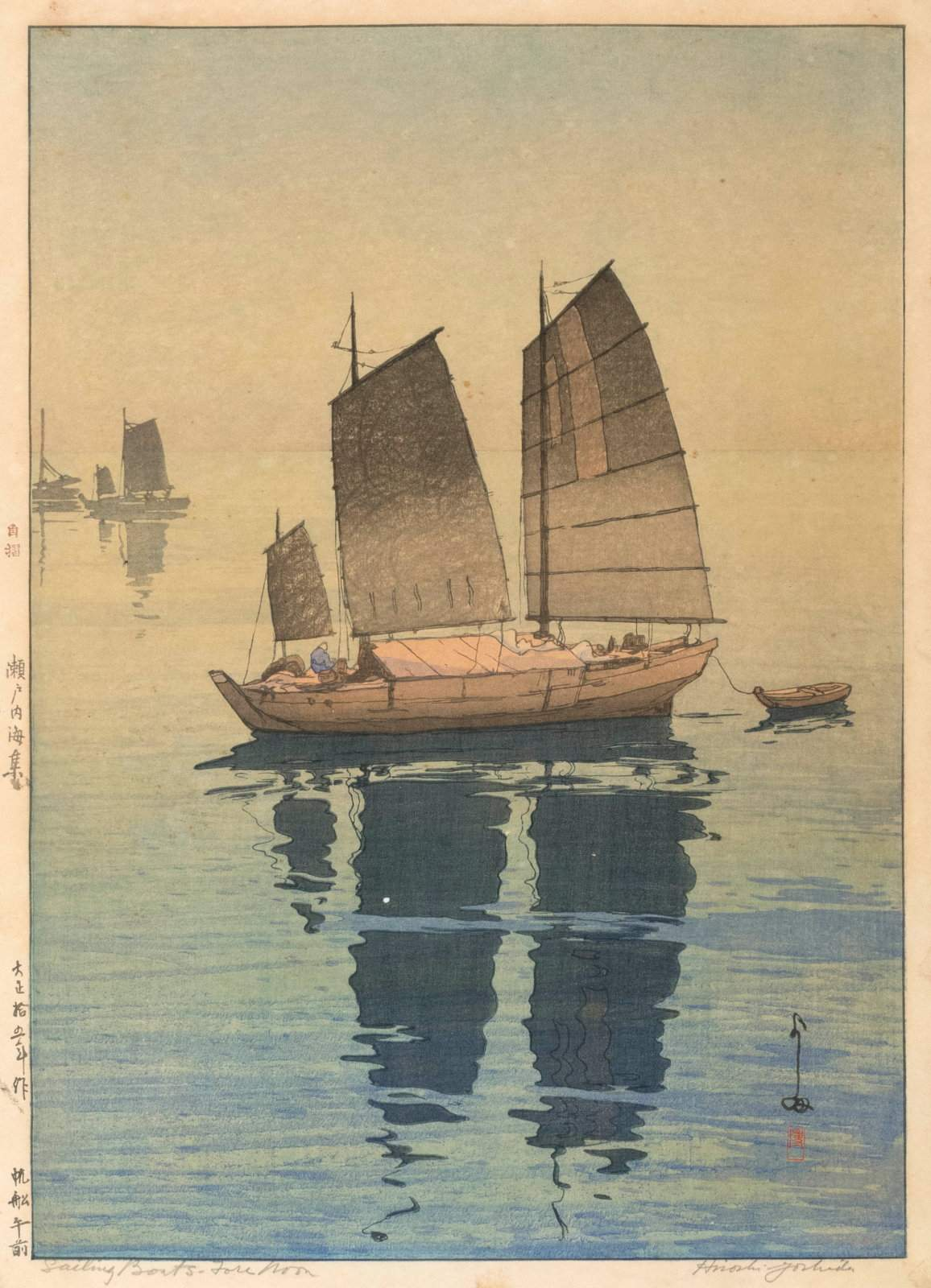
Sailing Boats, Forenoon

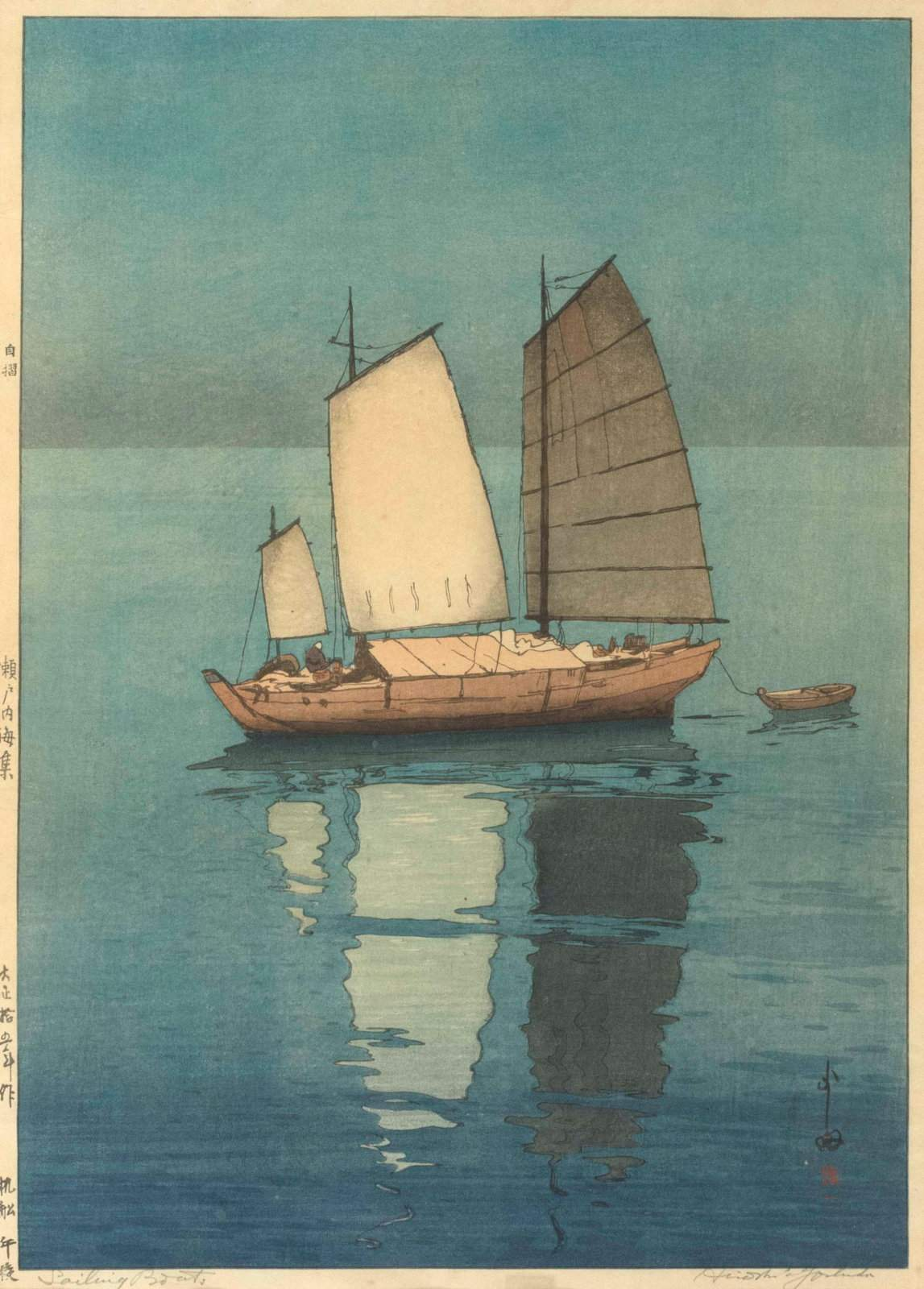
Sailing Boats, Afternoon

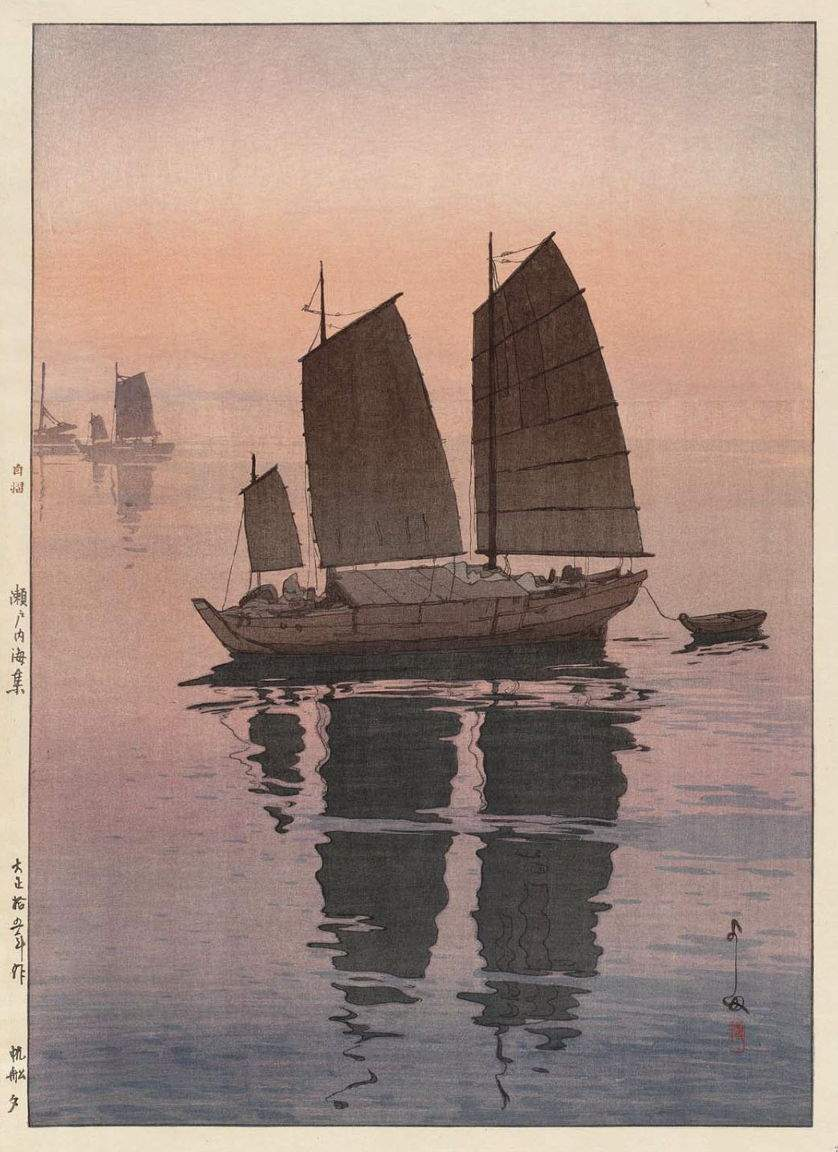
Sailing Boats, Evening

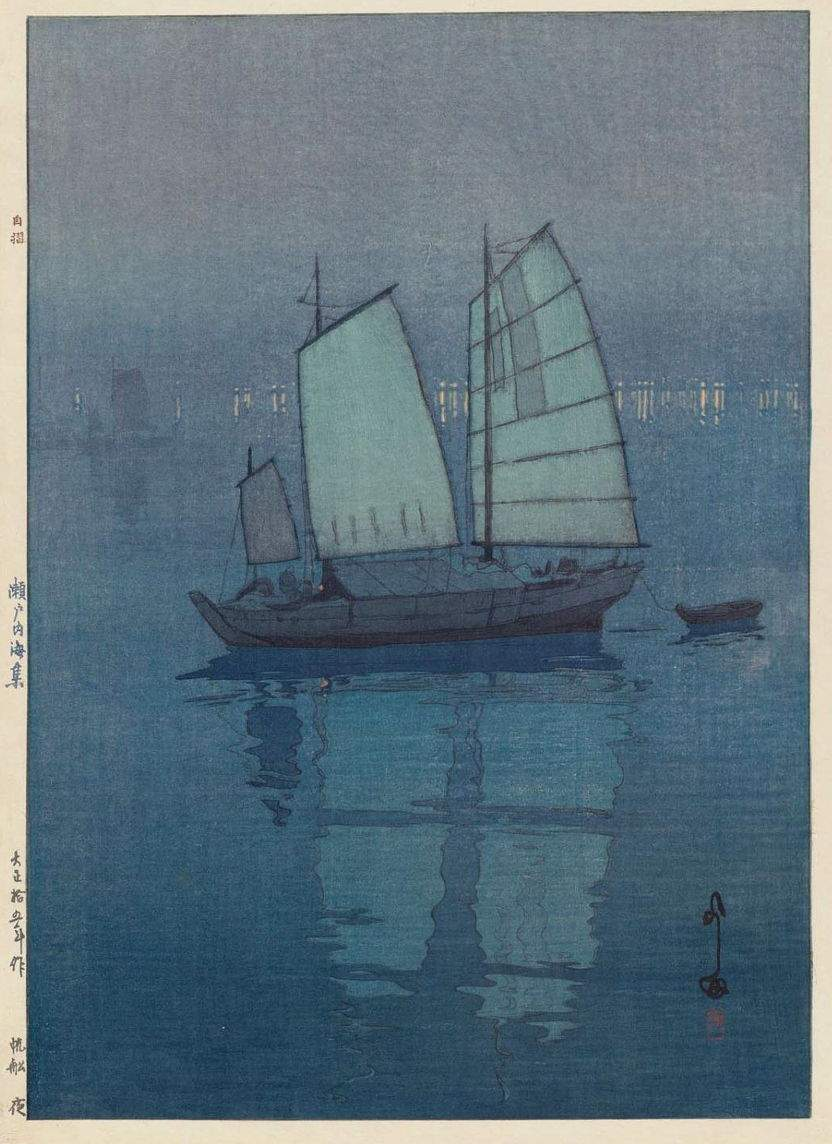
Sailing Boats, Night

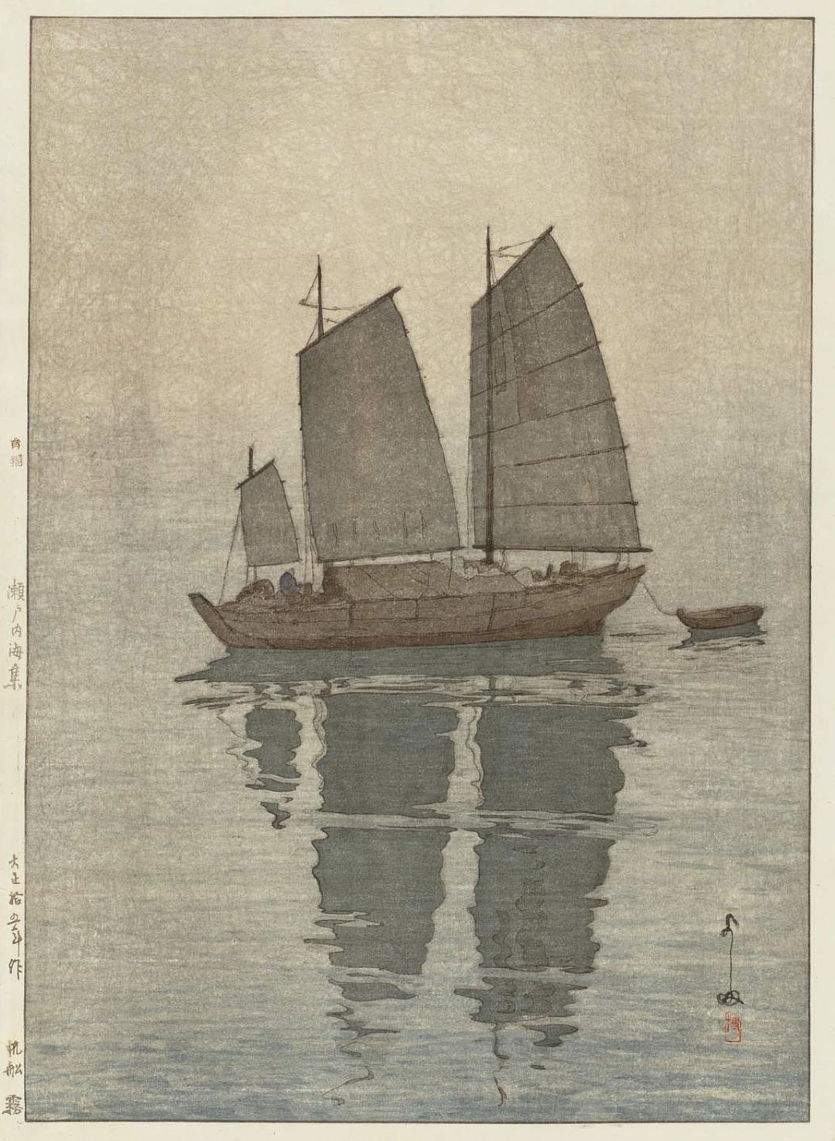
Sailing Boats, Mist

Yoshida left the carving and printing of the woodblocks to the craftsmen as in traditional Japanese woodblock printmaking, but he worked closely with them to instruct and supervise them strictly and stamped the finished works with the 自摺 (self-printing, jizuri) seal. He believed that in order to instruct the craftsmen, he had to acquire more skill than the craftsmen, so he carved the woodblocks himself for some of his works. His curiosity extended beyond woodblock printing to other media: his house featured mosaic floors, marble sculptures, inlaid cork pictures and stained-glass windows that he made himself. He experimented with printing on silk instead of paper, cut blocks from woods other than the standard cherry, and used zinc plates for especially fine details in editions of fifty or more prints.

== The Yoshida family legacy ==
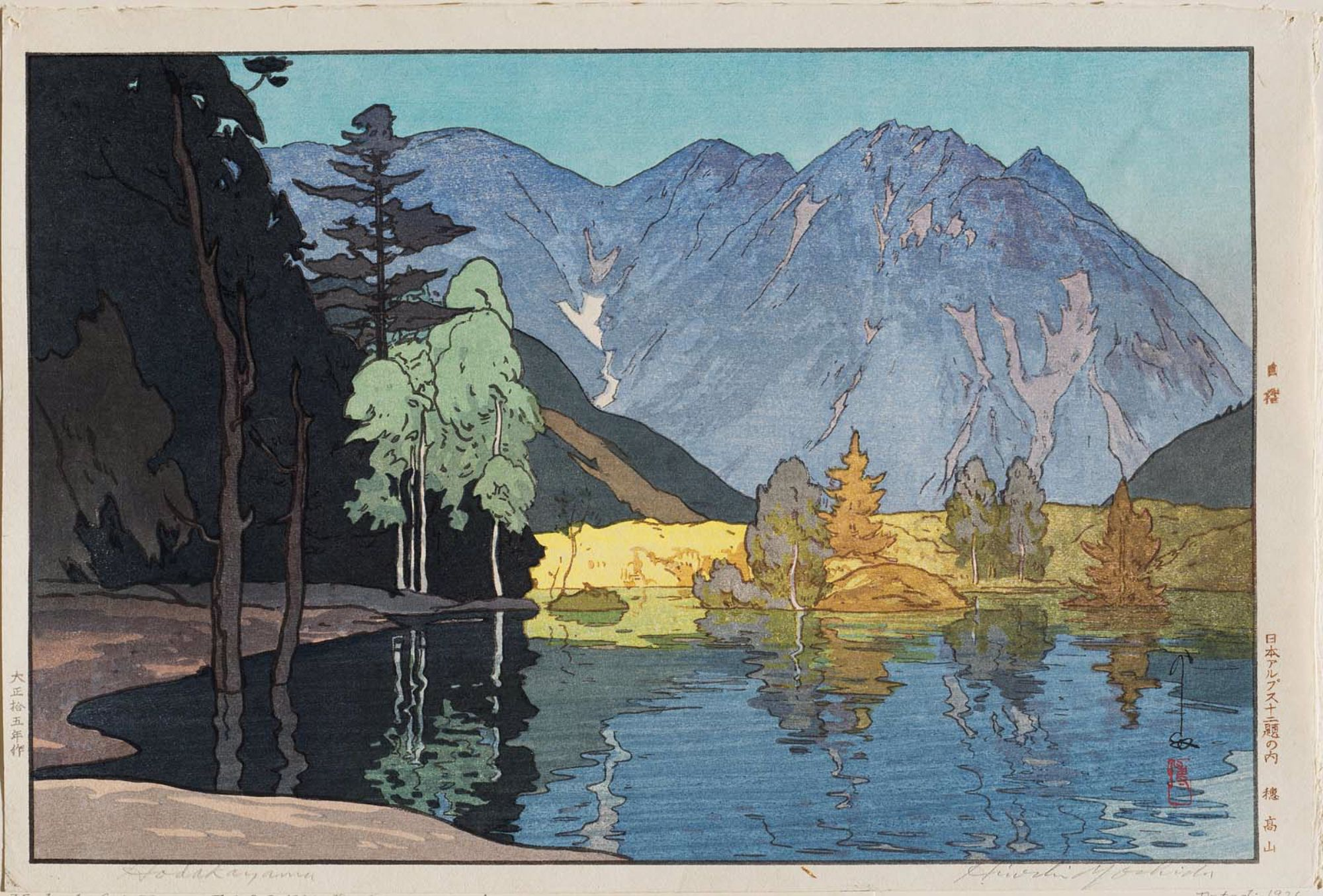
Hodakayama, from the series Twelve Scenes in the Japan Alps, 1926. His second son was named after Mt. Hotaka, Yoshida's favorite mountain.

The artistic lineage of the Yoshida family of eight artists: Kasaburo Yoshida (1861–1894), whose wife Rui Yoshida was an artist; their daughter Fujio Yoshida (1887–1987); Hiroshi Yoshida (1876–1950), their adopted son, who married Fujio; Tōshi Yoshida (1911–1995), Hiroshi's son, whose wife Kiso Yoshida (1919–2005) was an artist; Hodaka Yoshida (1926–1995), another of Hiroshi's sons, whose wife Chizuko Yoshida (1924–2017) and daughter Ayomi Yoshida (b. 1958) are artists. This group, four men and four women spanning four generations, provides a perspective on Japanese history and art development in the turbulent 20th century. Although they inherited the same tradition, the Yoshida family artists have worked in different styles with different sensibilities. Toshi Yoshida and the Yoshida family have used Hiroshi's original woodblocks to create later versions, including posthumous, of his prints. Prints created under Hiroshi Yoshida's management with special care have a jizuri (自摺; self-printed) seal kanji stamp, which indicates that he played an active role in the printing process of the respective print. Hiroshi Yoshida's signatures vary depending on the agents and time of creation. Prints originally sold on the Japanese market do not carry a pencil signature or a title in English.

Yoshida was fond of mountains and wanted to name his first son Hakusan (白山), after Mount Hakusan, but decided against it when his wife objected. Fifteen years later, he named his second son Hodaka (穂高), after Mount Hotaka. It is said that he loved Mt. Hotaka the most of all the mountains, and through his artistic activities he created many works depicting Mt. Hotaka.

== Works in museums ==
His works are held in several museums worldwide, including the British Museum, the Toledo Museum of Art, the Brooklyn Museum, the Harvard Art Museums, the Saint Louis Art Museum, the Dallas Museum of Art, the University of Michigan Museum of Art, the Clark Art Institute, the Portland Art Museum, the Indianapolis Museum of Art, the Carnegie Museum of Art, the Tokyo Fuji Art Museum, the Detroit Institute of Arts, the Seattle Art Museum, the Museum of Fine Arts, Boston, the Fine Arts Museum of San Francisco, the Davis Museum at Wellesley College, and the Mount Holyoke College Art Museum.

== Publications ==
In 1939 Hiroshi Yoshida wrote Japanese Wood-Block Printing, a comprehensive guide to the craft of woodblock printing in the shin-hanga style. It was published by The Sanseido Company, Ltd. of Tokyo and Osaka in 1939.

== Gallery ==
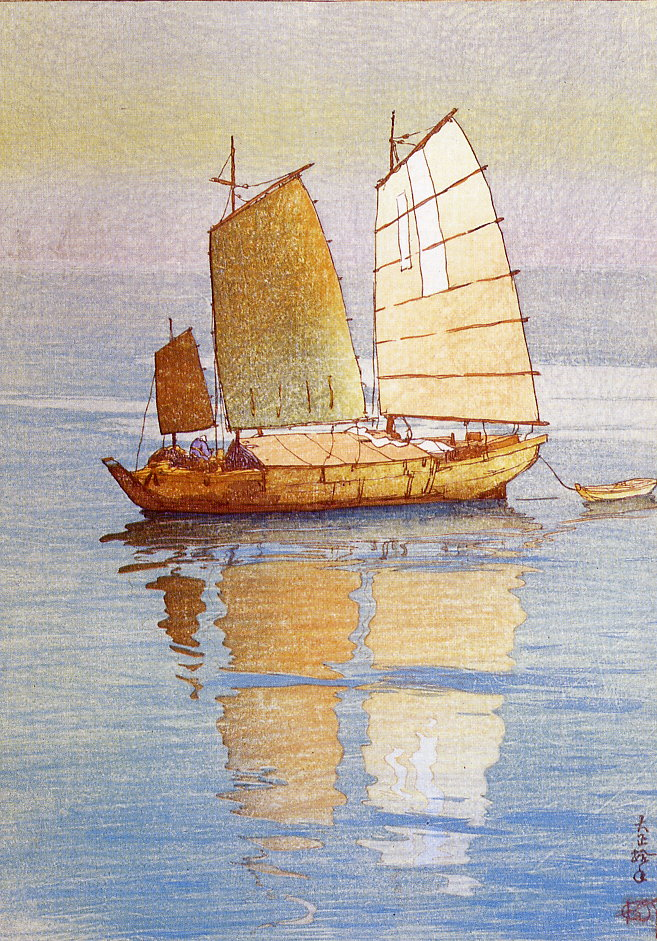
Sailing Boats, 1921

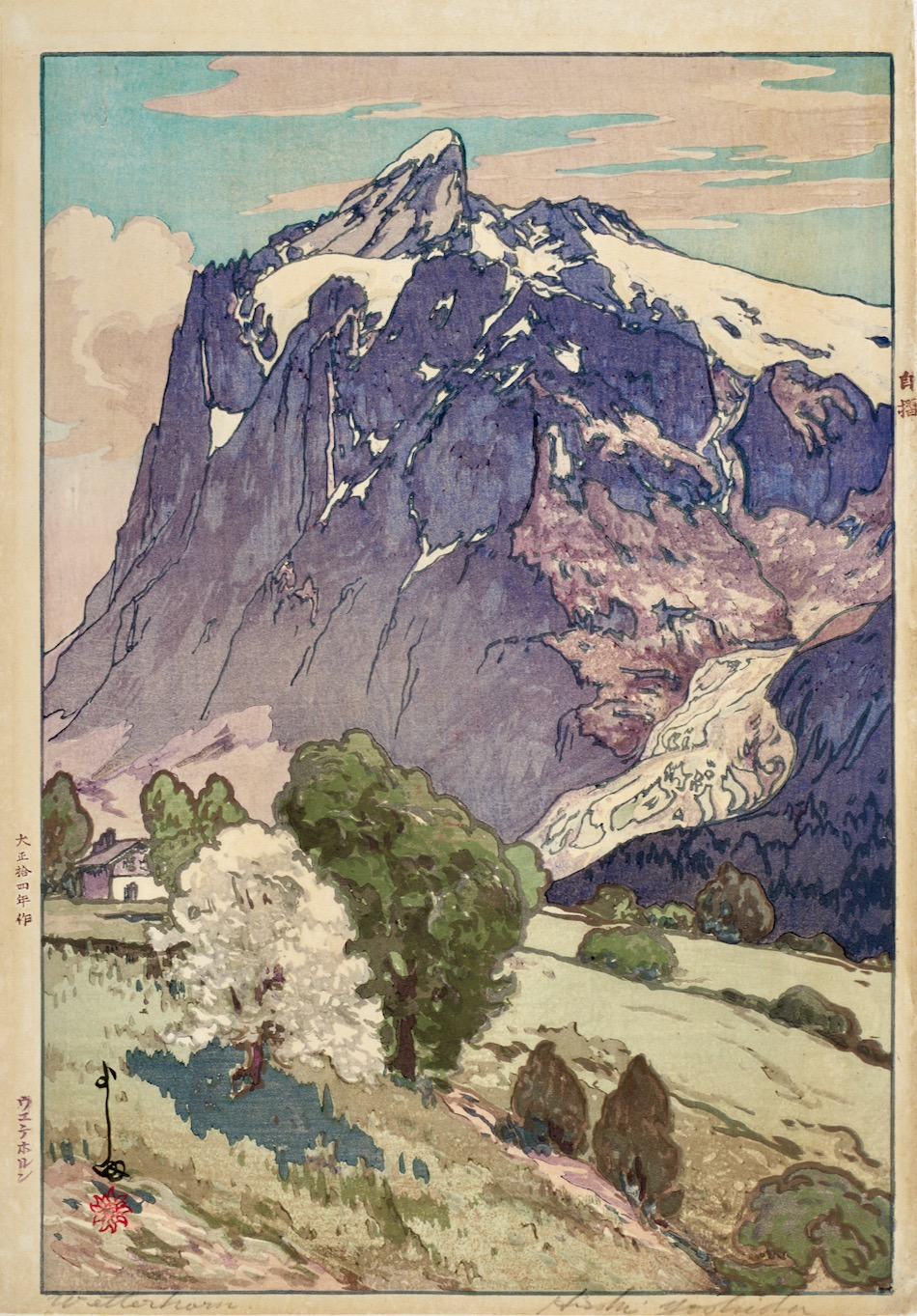
The Wetterhorn, from The Europe Series, 1925

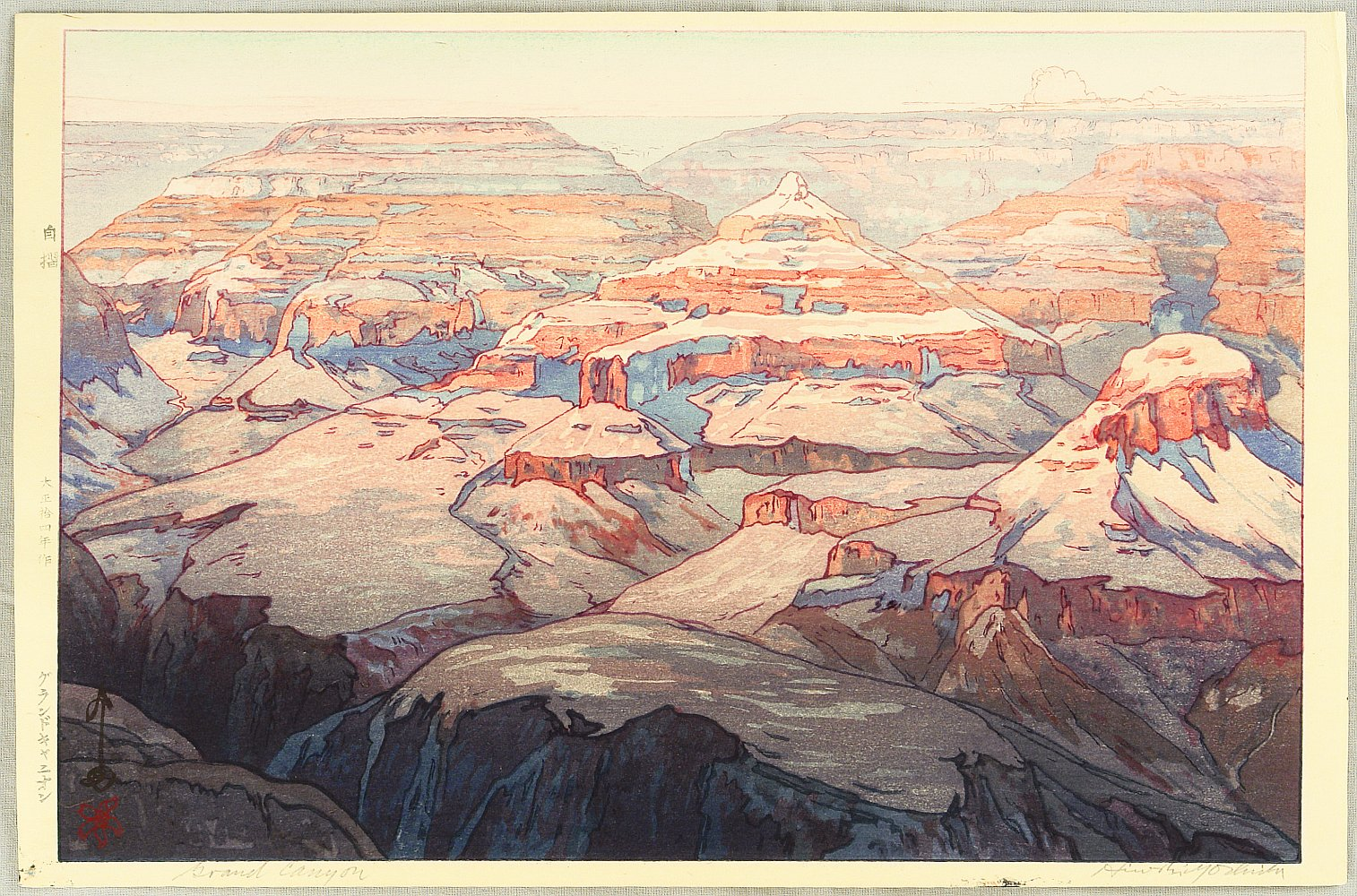
The Grand Canyon, from The United States Series, 1925

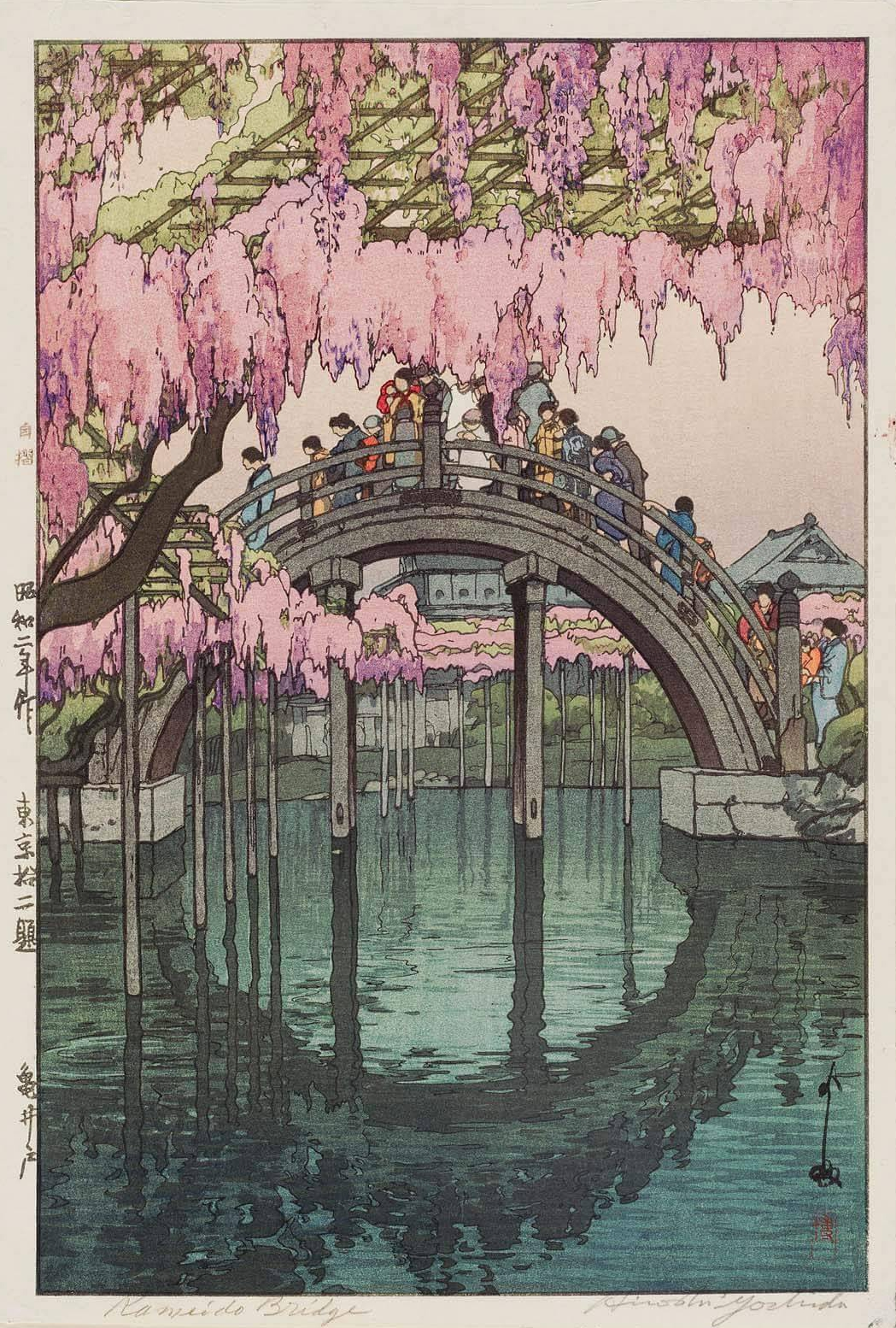
Kameido (Drum bridge at Kameido shrine Tokyo), 1927

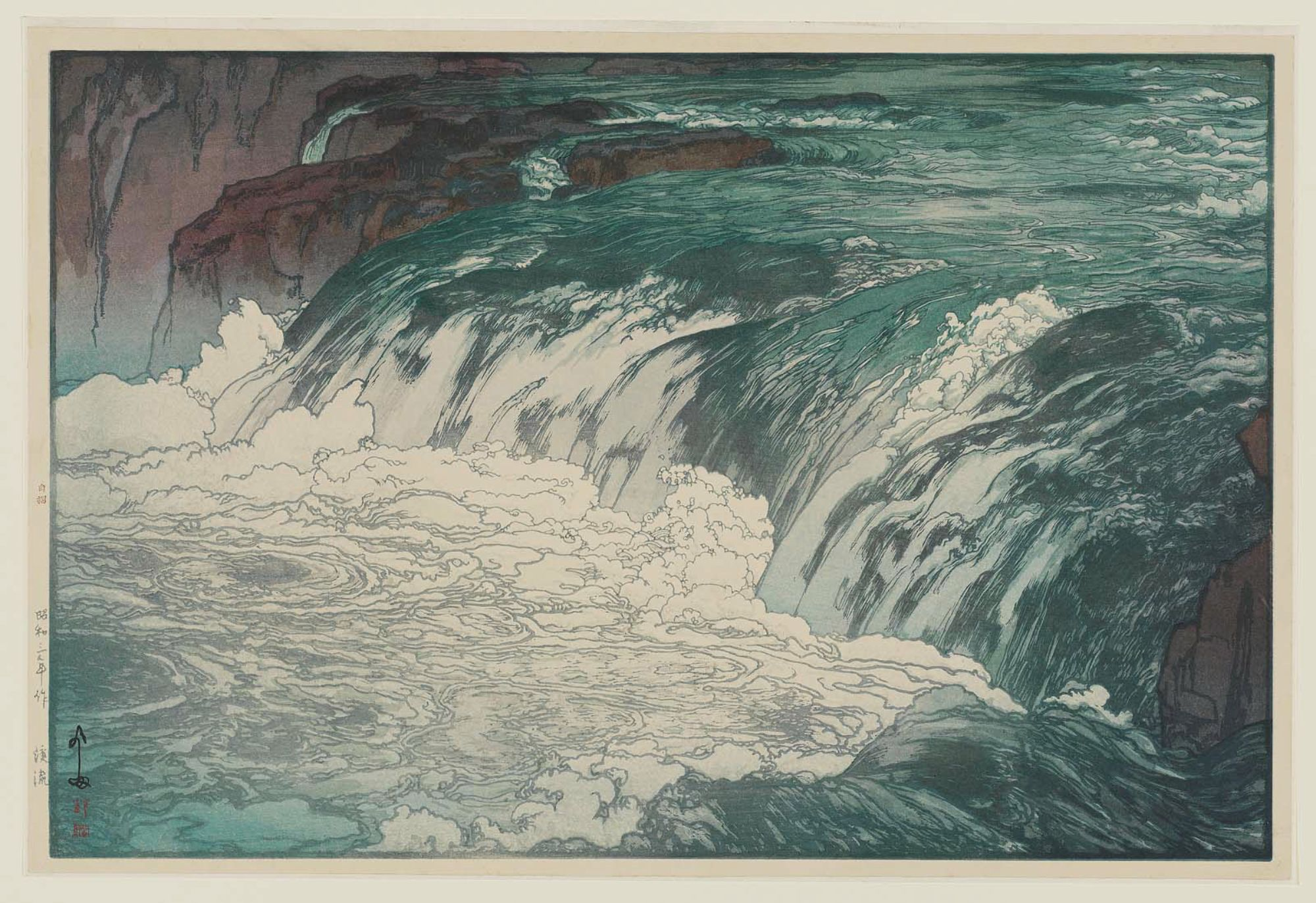
Rapids at the Upper Reaches of Tone River, 1928

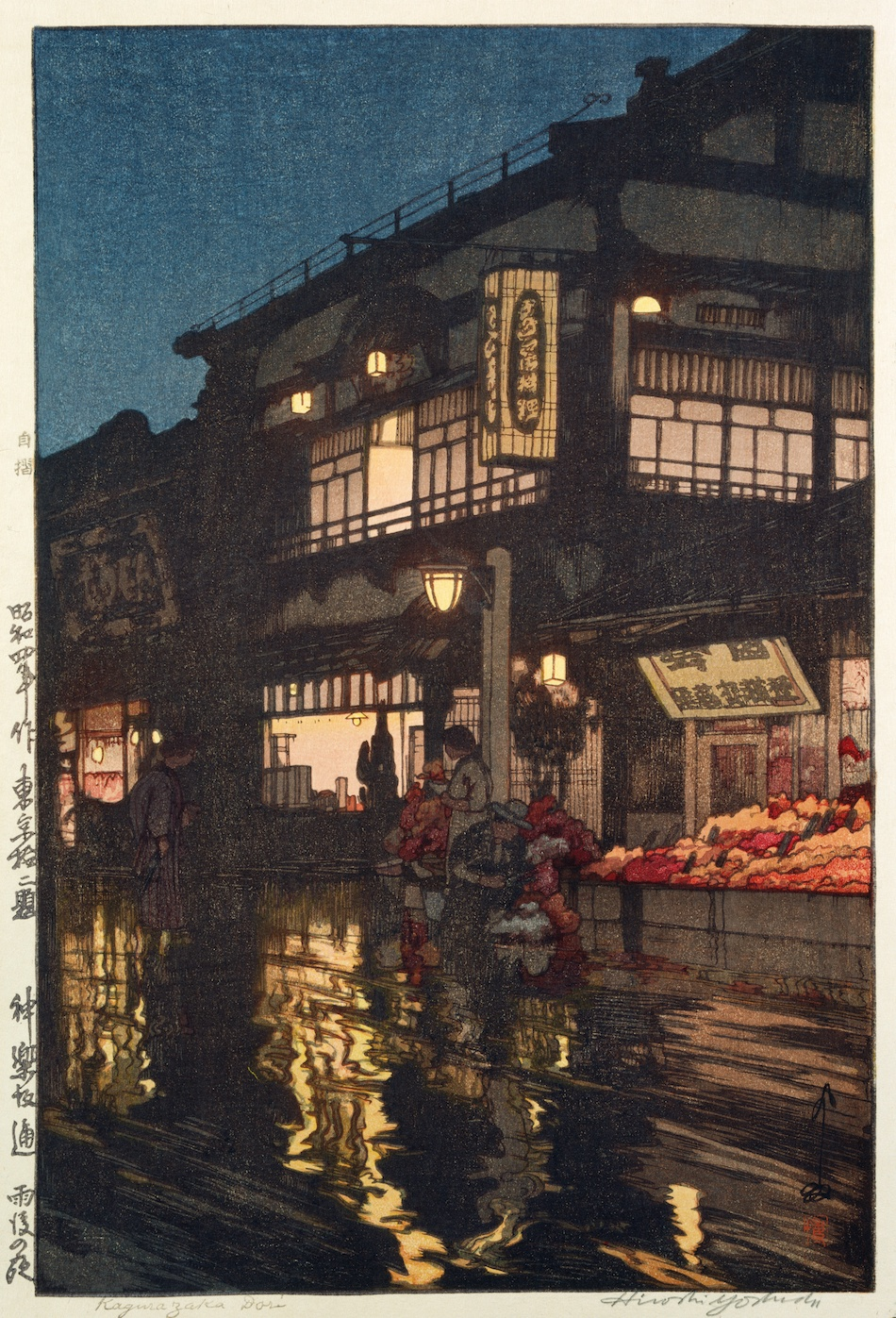
Kagurazaka Street after a Night Rain, 1929

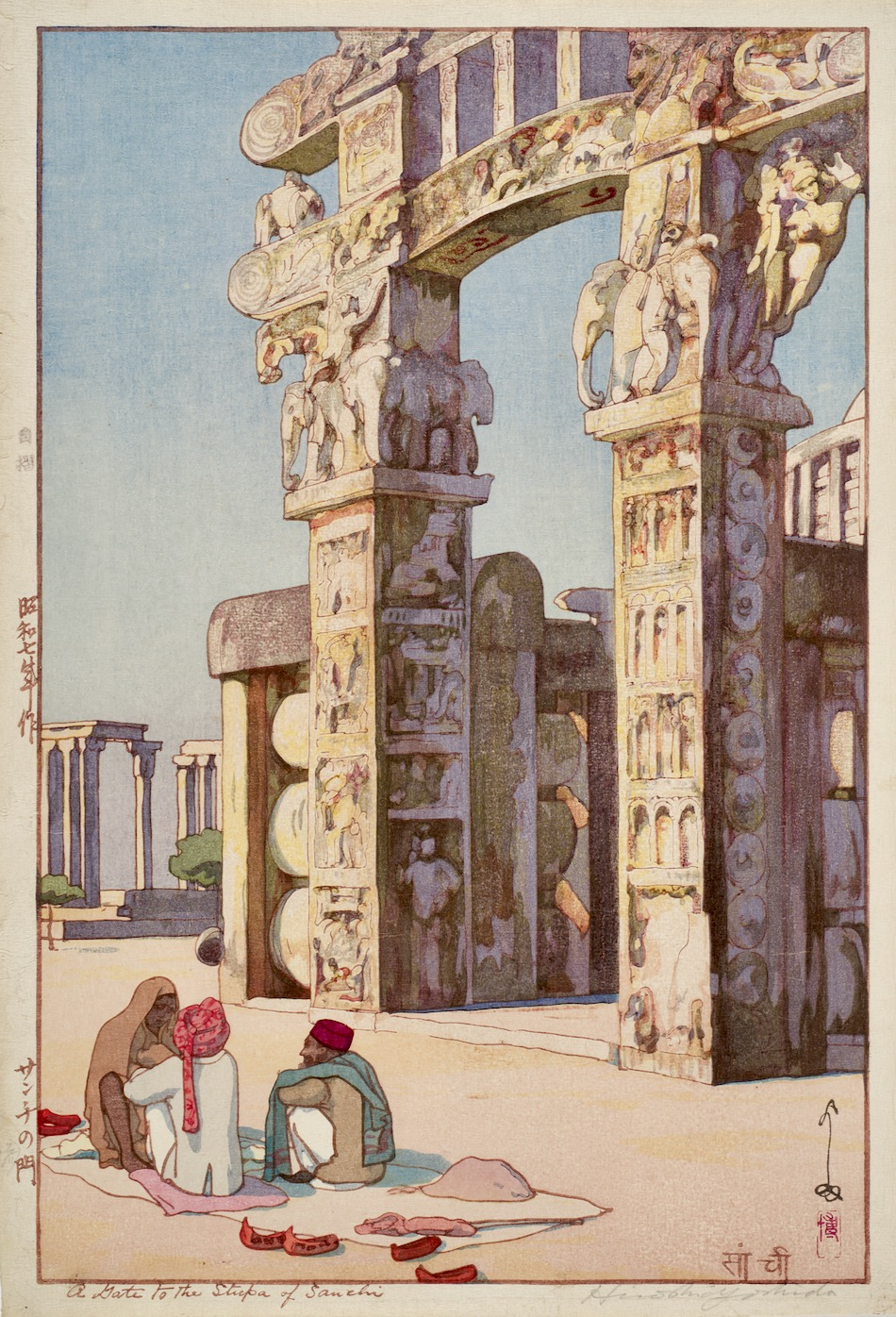
A Gate to the Stupa of Sanchi, from the series India and Southeast Asia, 1932

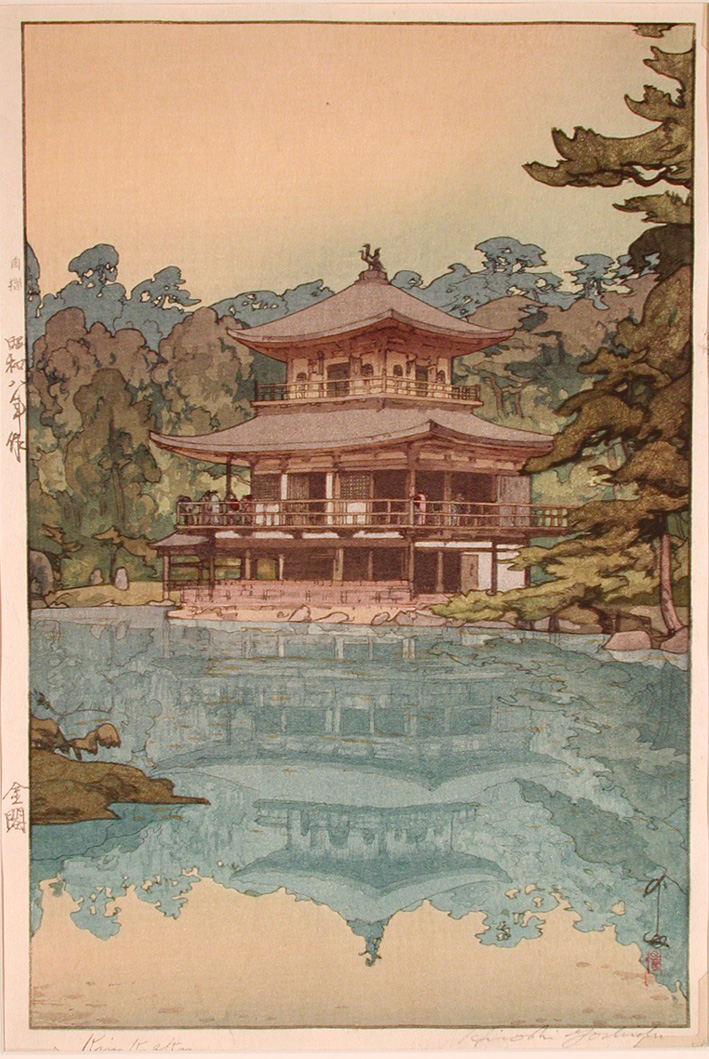
The Golden Pavilion, 1933

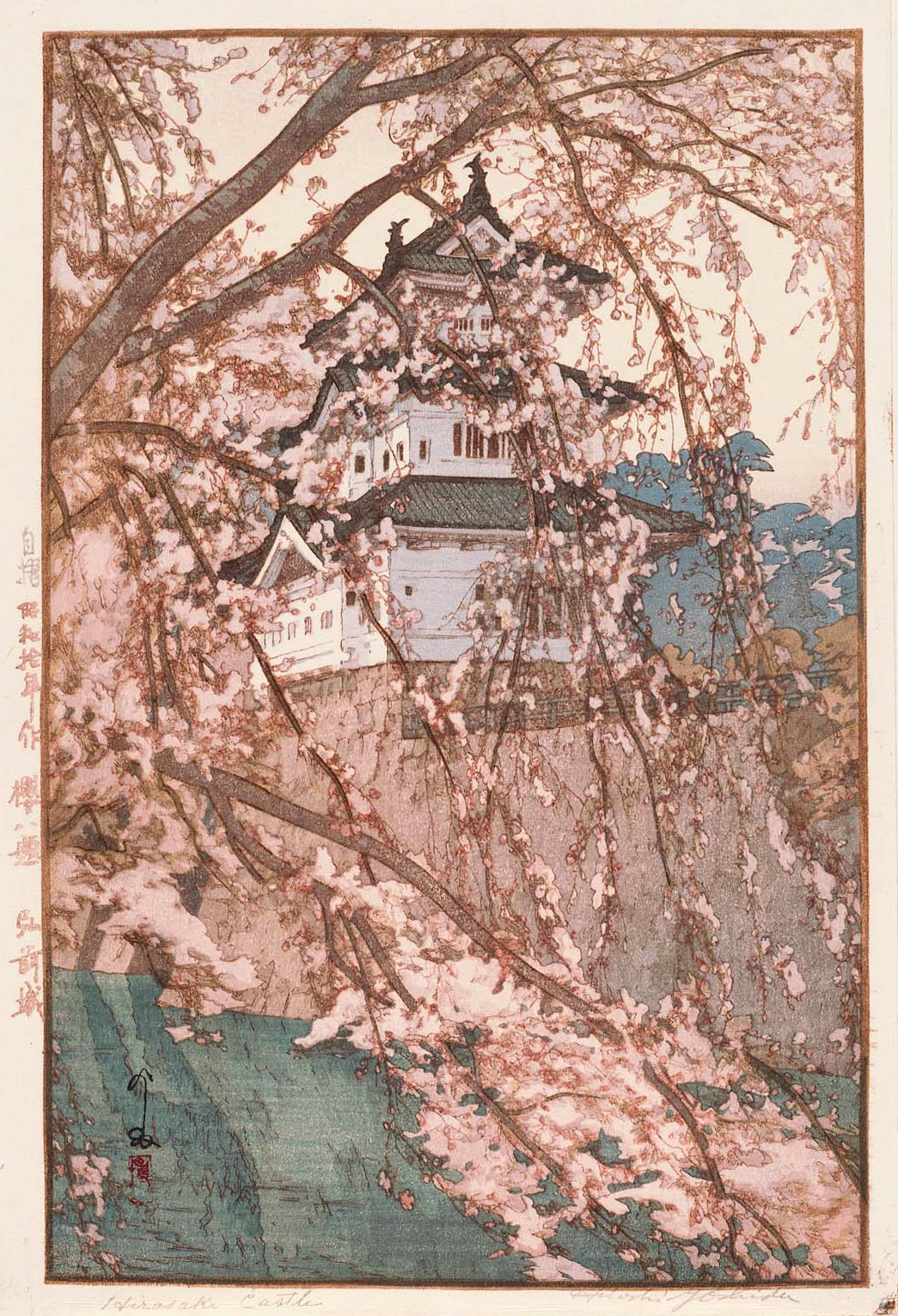
Hirosaki Castle, from the series Eight Scenes of Cherry Blossoms, 1935

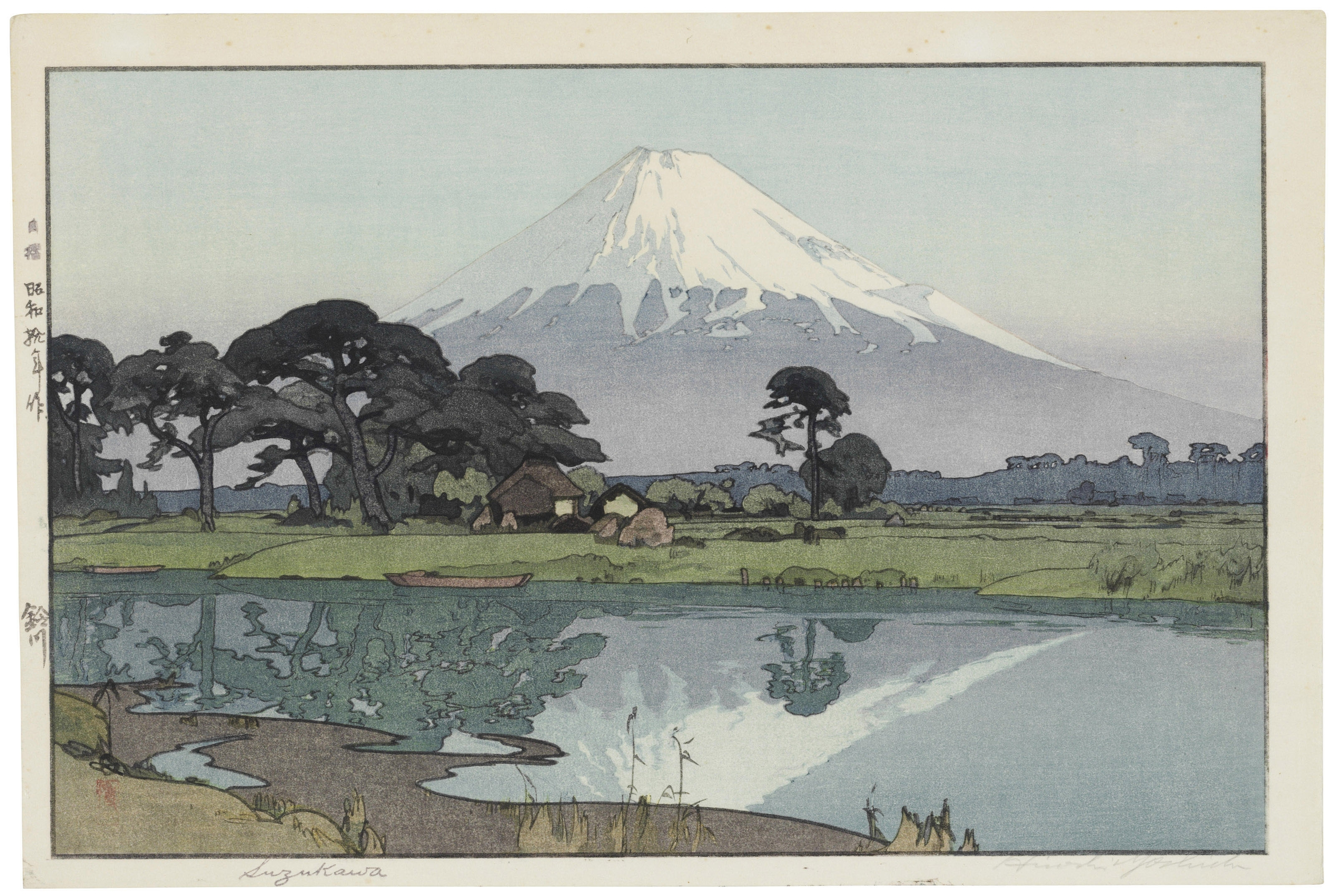
Suzukawa River, 1935

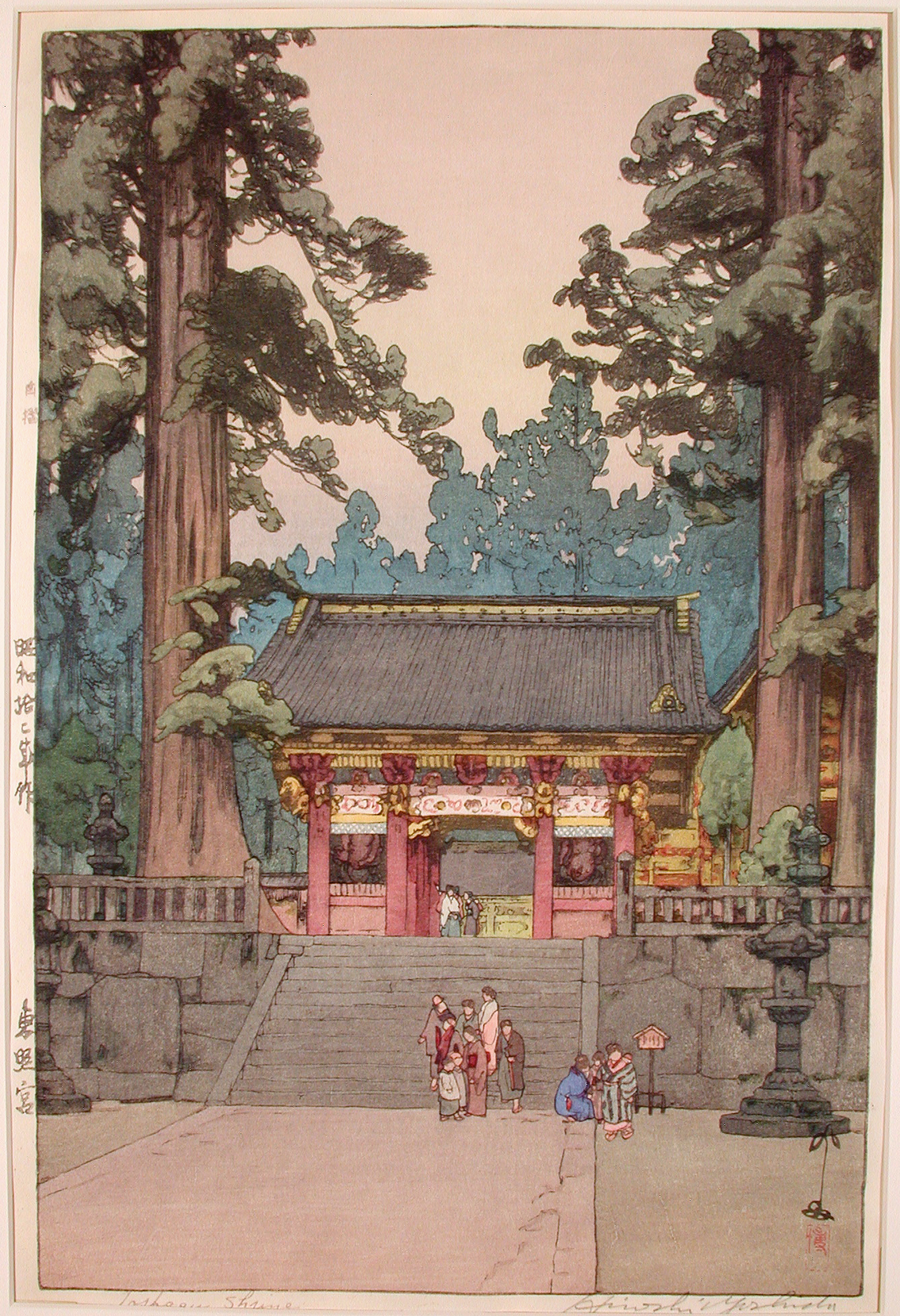
Toshogu Shrine, 1937

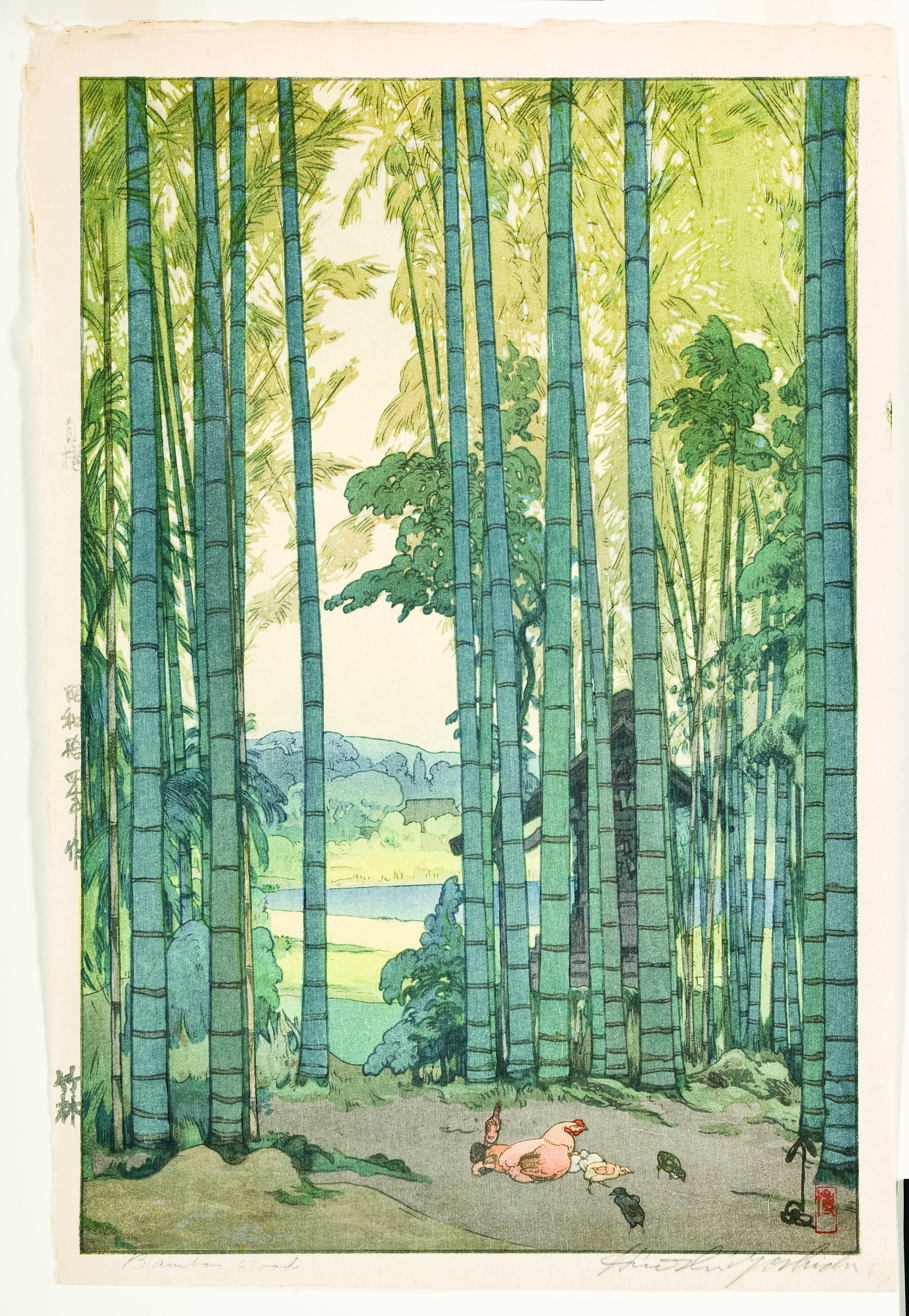
Bamboo Grove, 1939

== General references ==
- Allen, Laura W. (2002). A Japanese Legacy: Four Generations of Yoshida Family Artists. Minneapolis: Minneapolis Institute of Arts. ISBN 978-0-912964-87-4.
- Fiorillo, John. "Hiroshi Yoshida (1876–1950)". Viewing Japanese Prints. Archived from the original on August 7, 2007.
- Skibbe, Eugene M. (January 1993). "The American Travels of Yoshida Hiroshi". Andon. Vol. 43. pp. 59–74.
- The Complete Woodblock Prints of Yoshida Hiroshi. Tokyo: Abe Publishing Co. 1987.
- Yoshida, Toshi; Rei, Yuki (1966). Japanese Printmaking, A Handbook of Traditional & Modern Techniques. Rutland, Vermont & Tokyo, Japan: Charles E. Tuttle Co. Inc.
- Blakeney, Ben B. (1953). Yoshida Hiroshi Print-maker. Tokyo, Japan: Foreign Affairs Association of Japan.
- Yoshida, Hiroshi (1939). Japanese Wood-Block Printing. Tokyo & Osaka: Sanseido Co., Ltd.
