= Bidou Yamaguchi =

Bidou Yamaguchi (山口 毘堂, Yamaguchi Bidō), a master Noh mask carver in the Hōshō tradition, was born Yamaguchi Hiroki on February 28, 1970, in Fukuoka, Fukuoka, on the island of Kyūshū in Japan.

As an outstanding figure in the younger generation, Bidou illustrates how this ancient Japanese art is being both perpetuated and renewed.

== Discovery ==
After attending public school in Fukuoka, Hiroki enrolled in Kuwasawa Design School in Tokyo, from which he graduated in 1991. (Bidou, see Sources, below)

On a trip to the United States in 1991 Hiroki visited museums in major cities, some of which had large collections of Asian art. He was attracted to Japanese Noh masks. Fascinated by these old hand-carved masks and their history as part of an ancient art form, he decided to learn how to carve such masks. (Interview) Back in Japan, before talking to any master carver, he began work on his first mask, one called okina, an old man mask for one of earliest characters in Noh tradition. (Noh)

There are five major traditions for Noh drama: Kanzu, Hōshō, Kamparu, Kita, and Kongō. Each school has its own style for masks, and each school also has an archive in which the oldest examples of its masks are preserved. (Noh)

== Apprenticeship ==
Hiroki was drawn to the Hōshō tradition. He was introduced to master carver Gendou Ogawa, who is a Living National Treasure in Japan. Hiroki showed him the okina mask he had carved. (Bidou; Japan) The master was surprised that a person could - by himself - carve a mask that so closely emulated the oldest examples of that mask. He accepted Hiroki as his apprentice. After five years, about half the usual time, Gendou awarded him the status of "master carver" and gave him the artist name "Bidō." (AsiaAlive) The name is constructed of two parts, "Bi" from Bishamonten, the God of War, and "dou" meaning "stack of wood." It indicates that Bidou could attack a large pile of old wood like the frenzied God of War, and quickly carve it into masks. (Interview) Bidou (as he spells his name in the English-speaking world) no longer uses the name given him at birth.

Bidou has studied the Hōshō tradition by going to the Hōshō Noh Gakudo in Tokyo, a school and theater with its own archives of antique masks, some of which are about 500 years old. After having carefully studied a particular mask, Bidou chooses an appropriate block of Japanese cypress wood (hinoki), one that has cured for about a century. On it he first draws guidelines, and then begins to shape the piece using traditional Japanese woodcarving tools. (AsiaAlive) The blades of the knives and chisels are made of three layers of steel, just like renowned ancient Japanese swords. In smoothing the surface of the mask for the final time, Bidou never uses sandpaper, but only the sharp edge of his chisel. That surface is then coated with many layers of lacquer, each layer requiring several weeks to dry. The final procedure is to simulate signs of wear and old age on the mask's surface. (Interview)

== Present Work ==
Initially Bidou created many of the traditional Noh masks. Recently he broadened the range of his work to include other astonishing mask styles, such as his "persona" or Western style mask. Realizing that masks in the medieval Muromachi period in Japan were being created at about the same time as oil portraits of women were being painted by famous artists in Europe, Bidou began sculpting a series of these Western faces in the form of Noh masks. The broad range of artists referenced include: Leonardo da Vinci, Michelangelo, Francisco Goya, Diego Velázquez, Sandro Botticelli, Johannes Vermeer, Amedeo Modigliani, Edvard Munch, and Gustav Klimt. (Sauer) A fascinating dialogue between Eastern and Western beauty has been the result. For example, he can place his Mona Lisa mask next to his ko-omote mask, the traditional Noh mask for a young woman, and the dialogue is apparent. (Sauer) Bidou says, "by synthesizing both traditions, I create three-dimensional ‘personae’ that breathe new life into these iconic faces and seek to suggest a fresher fusion of Eastern and Western cultures." (Bidou)

Bidou has lectured widely and has demonstrated and displayed both his traditional and newest work in galleries, universities, and museums in Japan, as well as the United States. His masks are in collections at Nihon University, Hōshō Noh Gakudo in Tokyo (Hōshō), the Minneapolis Institute of Arts, the Target Corporation Headquarters in Minneapolis, as well as in many private collections. Bidou also teaches sculpture in Tokyo. (Bidou) He is married to artist Ayomi Yoshida.

== Sources ==
- Bidou web site at http://www.Bidou-yamaguchi.com
- "Bidou Yamaguchi: Carved Masks," Jane Sauer Gallery, Santa Fe, New Mexico
- "Bidou Yamaguchi: Noh Masks and New Masks," AsiaAlive, Asian Art Museum, of San *Francisco, June 1-June 30, 2006; also web site at http://www.asianart.org/asiaalive.htm
- "Bidou Interview," Prof. Eugene Skibbe, Augsburg College, March 5, 2007, ms
- Hōshō Noh Gakudo, Tokyo, web site at http://www.hosho.or.jp
- Japan Arts Council, Noh and Kyogen at http://www2.ntj.jac.go.jp/unesco/noh/en/
- Twenty Plays of Nô Theatre, Donald Keene, ed., Columbia University Press, 1970

== See also ==
- Noh
- Masks
- Theatre of Japan
- Yoshida Family Artists
- Ayomi Yoshida
