= Hodaka Yoshida =

Japanese artist

Hodaka Yoshida (吉田 穂高, Yoshida Hodaka; September 3, 1926 – November 2, 1995) was a Japanese modernist artist who worked first in oils, and then from 1950 in the woodblock print medium. From the beginning of his career, he broadened the range of styles and techniques used by Yoshida family artists.

== Family ==
His father and mother, Hiroshi Yoshida and Fujio Yoshida, were both leading Western-style artists in Tokyo in oils, watercolors, and from 1925 in shin-hanga woodblock prints. Hodaka's older brother, Tōshi Yoshida, became the heir to the Yoshida Studio (today known as the Yoshida Hanga Academy) and worked in both oils and woodblock prints. Hodaka was supposed to become a scientist, but as the Second World War ended, he defied his father's plans and became, not only an artist, but one who focused on abstraction, a style his father disdained. (Skibbe, 11-12) Unlike others in the family, Hodaka's art is quite complex, with an "edgy" feel to it. (Robertson, 114)

== Early career ==
Before turning to ukiyo-e, Hodaka had also written tanka poetry. He began experimenting with woodcuts as early as 1949, but exhibited them alongside his oil paintings only in 1951; his debut as a print artist is generally dated to 1952, when he showed his prints at the Hanga Kyōkai's annual exhibition, where they were warmly received by the public.

In 1950, Hodaka met the artist Chizuko Inoue at the Taiheiyō-Gakai, the society founded in 1902 by Hiroshi Yoshida, while he was carving and printing his own woodblocks; Chizuko had returned to Tokyo after wartime evacuation to Aomori and had quickly begun exhibiting her oil paintings with the same society. The two soon began exhibiting together, and, sharing his father's passion for travel, Hodaka set off for the Americas with Chizuko in search of new inspiration and a desire to experience foreign cultures, a decision that marked the beginning of the period now identified with his later success and fame as an international artist. They married in June 1953.

== Analysis of his work ==
Instead of having a straight line development, his work moved forward in a series of abrupt stages. During his 1953 honeymoon, Hodaka visited the celebrated garden of the Katsura Imperial Villa, an experience he described as profound, which led him to see objects and the space around them differently and gave him a sense of greater freedom and access to deeper feelings to express in his art. His 1955 encounter in Mexico with primitive Pre-Columbian artifacts and architecture, not only Maya artifacts but also pyramids and architecture, experienced with the same intensity, radically reoriented his art; a further round-the-world trip in 1957/58 continued to draw an enthusiastic response from him to primitive artifacts seen in ethnographic museums, to the point that he came to believe the raw life of primitive peoples exemplified a magical impulse essential to their artistic creativity. The numerous photographs he took during his travels went on to play an important role in the development of his style.

A survey of the total range of his work (about 600 prints over 45 years) reveals distinct periods, each having major changes in subject matter, vocabulary, style, and color palette. His styles, while always his own, drew from Expressionism, Pop, Photorealism, and Color Field abstraction. (Allen, et al., 114-119) Broadly speaking most of his prints would be categorized as sōsaku-hanga.

Main periods:

1950-53 Early Prints - simple modern observations of nature and human nature

1953-54 Buddhist Prints - modern reformulations of traditional Japanese material culture

1955-63 Primitive Prints - abstractions of the primitive in Pre-Columbian forms

1963-66 Folk Prints (Transition A) - witty perspectives on indigenous South American culture

1966-74 Mythology and Landscape Prints - Pop art exposé of modern culture in decline

1974-79 House and Nude Prints (Transition B) - the tension aroused by premodern/modern

1979-84 FMC House Prints - the basic human element in houses from various cultures

1984-91 Recollection Prints (Transition C) - noting old and distressed objects

1991-95 Wall Prints - the human story on the surfaces of old walls

During the Primitive Prints period, Hodaka devised visually striking anthropomorphic forms recalling Pre-Columbian bas-reliefs, exploring aspects of mystery, power, magic, movement and mass in combinations that produced memorable images. In Ancient People (1956), two geometric yet human-like figures, representing contrasting male and female forms, face one another; a powerful, massive combination of stacked forms carved in stone on the left approaches, or leans toward, the smaller figure on the right, as if in an ancient narrative involving primitive aspects of human behaviour, and the "comma" shape at the apex of the right-hand figure becomes a recurring motif throughout Hodaka's third period, designating vital force. Following a similar theme, in the same year Hodaka used Maya-inspired forms in Masks, in which three circles are placed at three points, so that the dark grey mask at the top can be read as a frontal or profile view of a face or mask, while the textured brown form on the right suggests carved stonework, producing an overall effect of the primordial magic communicated by a primitive culture. The influence of Maya and Aztec culture continued to appear in Hodaka's work into the early 1960s, though often diffused and fully assimilated into abstraction; combined with his experiments in collage and monoprint transferred onto woodcuts, the result was a kind of totemic vertical arrangement of forms and colours, as in the 1962 print Cause, Yellow, in which lines, circular forms and commas are superimposed on a massive, structured, stone-like background, the stasis of the lower half offset by movement and energy in the upper section of the design. During this same period Hodaka also produced designs of traditional Japanese scenes rendered in simplified forms enhanced by printing techniques that described textured surfaces: in Ishidōrō (1956) a stone lantern stands in the foreground, with a nobedan stone path and buildings behind it outlined in simple geometric forms filled with solid blacks and textured greys; Chashitsu (1956) takes a similar approach, its nobedan path leading toward the entrance with a dramatic sense of receding depth.

In his House and Nude Prints, Hodaka would photograph a collage he had assembled, and a photo-etched zinc plate inked in black supplied the detail for the final image, while the woodblocks supplied the colour. In the 1976 print Sakuhin, three nudes appear before a large old house, the most prominent figure caught in a dance pose in the middle of a wide street. From 1979 to 1985, Hodaka removed nude figures from his compositions while continuing to draw on his photographs of old houses; the first known design in this mode is Watakushi no korekushon yori - shiroi ie (1979), a large-format work whose house Hodaka had photographed in Nicaragua, but rather than combining woodcut and photo-etching, he unusually carved the entire image by hand, causing any explicit human presence to disappear, though a rocking chair on the porch suggests invisible inhabitants within. The shift here, away from the earlier houses-with-nudes style, is toward a focus on inanimate, human-built structures treated as fully evocative primitive objects in their own right. In a similar vein, Hodaka produced a series of prints of walls and doors expressing his response to worn, weathered objects, leading to views suggestive of monuments whose marks and damage hinted at readable messages or glyphs left behind by the people who built and used them. For Green Wall, H.M. (1982), Hodaka used a photograph he had taken in Huejotzingo, Mexico, in 1981; the wall, a section of an old house reused within a newly built one, must have held for him a symbolic resonance suggesting mysterious power or magic, not unlike the effect Maya artifacts and architecture had had on him when he first explored the theme in the mid-1950s. He modified this singular approach for one of his largest prints, Promontory (1988), depicting a desolate land with a bare landscape and the concrete foundations of what had once been a building, conveying a stark warning about the devastation humans were unleashing on both the natural and the civilized worlds.

The print technology Hodaka used was not limited to woodblock, but included monoprinting, wood engraving, copper etching, silkscreen, lithograph, and often employed photo-transfer techniques. In this regard he was a pioneer in Japan in the 1960s and 70's. (Allen, et al., 114-117) His subject matter was drawn from objects in cultures all around the world. In spite of these various dynamics, each of Hodaka's periods is an exploration in the same basic direction, into what might be called modernist expressions of primitive human vitality. (Robertson, 114; Skibbe, 47-49) Individual prints show great artistry in composition and color.

== Modernist ==
In Chapter One of his book, A Fine Disregard: What Makes Modern Art Modern, 1990, Kirk Varnedoe says that modern art has four basic characteristics: (1) the flattened image instead of the illusion of space, (2) fragmentation and repetition in the composition, rather than the complete object, (3) primitivism, in the sense of an artifact revealing something latent deep within ourselves, and (4) the flight of the mind, the freedom to assume any point of departure, or to conceptualize as one wishes. Hodaka's art exemplifies all four characteristics, and he did this without suppressing his Japanese aesthetic sensibility. Hodaka clearly was a modern Japanese internationalist, and as such he broadened the artistic heritage of the Yoshida family. (www.hodakayoshidaprints.com)

The Japanese qualities of Hodaka's art are not hard to discern: his use of flat areas of colour is itself characteristic of Japanese aesthetics, as is his tendency to crop his subjects, letting a central image float, and to combine line and colour in patterns recalling brocade; his fascination with old, worn artifacts likewise reveals the traditional Japanese values of wabi (imperfection) and sabi (age) as applied to objects, poetry and the tea ceremony. Yet Hodaka's work remains unmistakably modern and international in scope, above all in his drawing, as an artist, on subjects, techniques and exhibition venues available across the world.

He exhibited mainly in major international art biennials, including the Lugano International Print Biennial (1962) and the Seoul International Print Biennial (1972). Hodaka became a member of the important Nihon Hanga Kyōkai association as early as 1952, and in 1957 taught woodblock printmaking at several universities in the United States, including in Hawaii. He held a solo exhibition at the Machida Shiritsu Kokusai Hanga Bijutsukan in 1988. Hodaka received many awards and prizes, including the Purple Ribbon Decoration (Hōshō) bestowed by the Emperor in 1990, and the Order of the Rising Sun, Fourth class, awarded by the Emperor posthumously in 1995. (Skibbe, 20)

Hodaka's wife, Chizuko Yoshida, née Inoue, (1924-2017) and their daughter Ayomi Yoshida (1958-) are both artists, and their son Takasuke (1959-) is an art jewelry maker. (Allen, 10) Ayomi Yoshida is today best known for her room-sized installations of wood shavings, exhibited in galleries and museums in Japan and the United States.

== Further readings ==
- Homma Masayoshi "Yoshida Hodaka no hanga," in Hangakan 8 (1984), 29–40
- Yoshida Hodaka Hangatan, Vol. 3, Shûzô sakka, Machida Shiritsu Kokusai Hanga Bijutsukan, 1988
- Skibbe, Eugene M. Yoshida Hodaka: The Magic of Art, Seascape, 1997
- Allen, Laura, et al. A Japanese Legacy: Four Generations of Yoshida Family Artists, Minneapolis Institute of Arts, 2002.
- Web site at http://www.hodakayoshidaprints.com
