= Chizuko Yoshida =

Japanese artist (1924–2017)

- Born: March 20, 1924; Yokohama, Japan
- Died: April 1, 2017 (aged 93); Yokohama, Japan
- Known for: Woodblock prints, geometric abstraction, embossing
- Movement: Modernism, Abstract expressionism, Op art
- Spouse: Hodaka Yoshida
- Children: Ayomi Yoshida

Chizuko Yoshida (née Inoue) (吉田 千鶴子, Yoshida Chizuko; March 20, 1924 – April 1, 2017 Yokohama) was a Japanese modernist artist, whose work reflected the development of art in Japan following World War II. She was noted for providing a connective link between widespread modern art movements (such as abstract expressionism and op art) and traditional Japanese imagery.

She was also important as the middle link in the succession of three generations of women artists in the widely recognized Yoshida family. She was the wife of artist Hodaka Yoshida (1926–1995). Hodaka's mother, Fujio Yoshida (1887–1987), was a noted artist alongside of her husband Hiroshi Yoshida (1876–1950). Chizuko's daughter, Ayomi Yoshida (born 1958), is well known for her modernist woodblock prints and room-size woodblock-chip installations. Three generations of women artists in one family is a rare phenomenon in Japanese art history.

== Early life and education ==
Despite later marrying into the Yoshida family of artists, neither of Chizuko-san's parents were artists. Her first creative experiences involved dancing in the Nichigeki Dance Team as a middle school student. Six months of this endeavor left Chizuko ill, forcing her to stop performing, though later in her career she would use dance-related themes in her visual work.

Chizuko then studied art at the Sato Girl's High School in Tokyo, where she began watercolor painting. Following graduation, she began studying under painter and printmaker, Fumio Kitaoka, who at the time served as president of the Nihon Hanga Kyōkai (Japan Print Association). While interning at Kitaoka's studio, Chizuko practiced oil painting and was first exposed to woodblock printing, which would later become an essential part of her practice.

In 1941, she studied design at Hongo Art Institute in Tokyo but did not get a degree because World War II interrupted her time there. Chizuko evacuated to Ayoama, but moved back to Tokyo after the war's end to continue painting.

== Career ==
In the late 1940s, Chizuko became a member of two important art associations. The first was Taiheiyō-Gakai (transl. Pacific Painting Society), an art group established in 1902 by her future father-in-law Hiroshi Yoshida and Ishikawa Toraji. In 1949, Chizuko was made an associate and would go on to exhibit with the group. The second art coalition was Shuyōkai (transl. Vermillion Leaf Society), a group for female oil painters established by her future mother-in-law Fujio Yoshida and her artist associates in 1920. Chizuko won a prize for her entry in a Shuyōkai exhibition.

Also in the late 1940s, Chizuko joined Seiki No Kai (transl. Century Society), "a group of avant-garde artists, writers, and intellectuals who met regularly to discuss art theory and criticism," hosted by Okamoto Tarō, a leading Surrealist painter and critic. During these seminars and through Tarō's teachings, Chizuko became interested in the relationship between Western modernism and traditional Japanese aesthetics, and began to adopt forms of abstraction in her work. This relationship would become a theme throughout her career.

Chizuko would meet her husband and fellow artist through Taiheiyō. They married in 1953. Around the same time, Chizuko-san moved from painting to woodblock printing as her primary artistic medium. In the late 1950s, Chizuko-san began to travel around the world with Hodaka and Fujio. These trips would provide inspiration for her woodblock prints, incorporating colors and forms seen abroad into her work.

Chizuko became member of the Japanese Print Association in 1954.

In 1956, Chizuko co-founded Joryū Hanga Kyōkai (transl. Women's Print Association) with eight other professional female printmakers, including Minami Keiko, Iwami Reika, Enokido Maki, Shishido Tokuko, and Kobayashi Donge.

The scale of Chizuko's work increased in the early 1960s. These prints contained massive architectural forms and incorporated Japanese calligraphic elements. Around this time, she also started to experiment with embossing the prints, which added visual depth to the works.

In 1969 Chizuko won a prize at the International Print Triennial for her piece, Star, Star, Star A.

The use of embossing would carry into Chizuko's work in the 1970s and was used to create pseudo-optical illusions within the prints. In the early 1970s, Hodaka began incorporating zinc plates, allowing for the use of more photographic images in his work. Chizuko would follow suit, gathering images from magazines and layering them with her woodblock prints. This method was used to create Chizuko-san's Reef series, based on her experience of seeing the Great Barrier Reef from an airplane while flying to Australia.

== Work ==
Her woodblock prints range from geometric abstraction to music to phenomena in nature to beautiful gestures composed of butterflies or flowers. A refined Japanese aesthetic prevails within her use of various modern international styles.

Despite the range of her work, Chizuko became best known for her butterfly prints, which proved consistently popular; commissions for new versions, both large and small, kept her producing them for many years, at times well after she had grown tired of the subject, simply because they sold so well. Her close, sustained observation of butterflies gives these prints, nearly always based on them, a striking intensity.

== Collections and exhibitions ==
Her work was exhibited at the College Women's Association of Japan from its beginning in 1956 and in the annual Contemporary Women's Exhibition in Ueno Museum from 1987 onwards. She was invited to exhibit in many international art and print biennials.

In 2014, Chizuko was part of the exhibit "Breaking Barriers: Japanese Women and Print Artists 1950-2000" at the Portland Art Museum. From September 27, 2025 – January 4, 2026, the Portland Art Museum mounted the first major museum retrospective of Chizuko’s work.

The largest collection of her works can be found in the Yokohama Museum of Art, with works also in the British Museum, Art Institute of Chicago, Philadelphia Museum of Modern Art, the Tokyo International Museum of Modern Art, and the Minneapolis Institute of Art.

== Personal life and death ==
Chizuko met Hodaka Yoshida when attending Onchi Kōshirō’s art seminar together. They married in June 1953 and had two children, Ayomi, a printmaker, and Takasuke, a jewelry artist.

Chizuko passed away from natural causes on April 1, 2017.
