= Tōshi Yoshida =

Japanese artist (1911–1995)

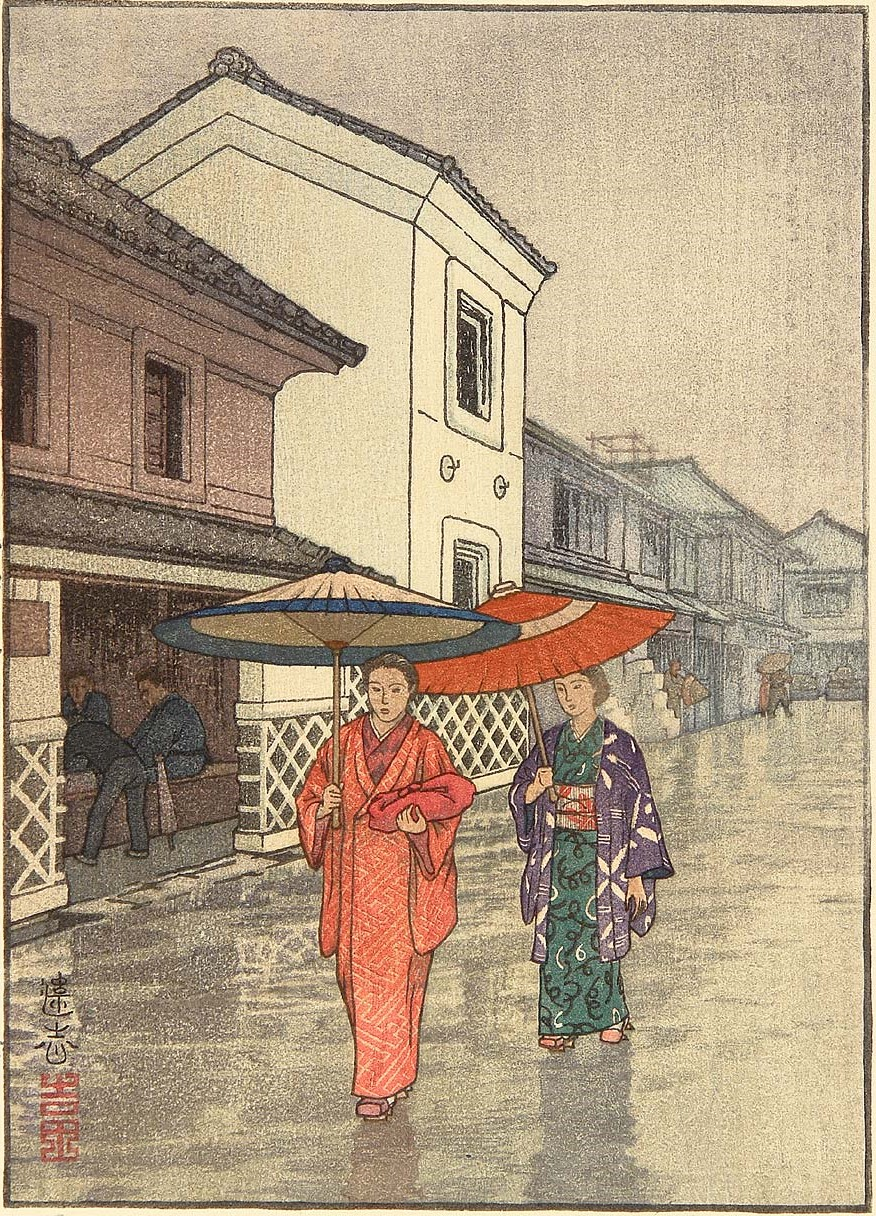
Umbrellas print by Tōshi Yoshida, 1940

Tōshi Yoshida (吉田 遠志, Yoshida Tōshi; July 25, 1911 – July 1, 1995) was a Japanese printmaking artist associated with the sōsaku-hanga movement, and was the son of shin-hanga artist Hiroshi Yoshida.

== Childhood ==
One of Yoshida's legs was paralysed during his early childhood. Not being able to attend school, he enjoyed watching animals and his father's printmaking workshop. Encouraged by his grandmother Rui Yoshida, Tōshi often sketched animals.

== Early artistic development ==
Yoshida's artistic career was a long struggle between fidelity to his father's legacy and freedom from it. In 1926, Tōshi chose animals as his primary subjects to distinguish himself from his father, who was a landscape printmaker. However, in the 1930s, Tōshi started making landscape paintings and prints similar to his father's works. Father and son traveled together and even painted side by side. From 1930 to 1931, Hiroshi and Tōshi traveled to India, Shanghai, Hong Kong, Malaysia, Singapore and Burma. From 1932 to 1935 Tōshi studied at the Taiheiyō Gakai, the painters' society his father had helped to co-found.

With the print Yataikise (1938), part of the ten-print series Yoru no Tokyo ("Tokyo at Night"), Tōshi carried the urban landscape of shin-hanga into its second generation, on the eve of the Pacific War. The print's cool, understated colour scheme reflects the chromatic studies of Hashiguchi Goyō adapted from Western art, while the backlit lettering on the lanterns and cloth banners of the food stalls translates effects of oil painting or watercolour into the woodblock medium; Tōshi, who had learned to cut and print blocks alongside his father, gave the surfaces a slightly grainy quality suggestive of dusk light dissolving the edges of forms into the night. The scene depicts Shinjuku's cheap entertainment district at the close of the 1930s, showing only a woman, her child and a waiting dog amid the silhouettes of men glimpsed behind the stalls' cloth flaps, an image whose quiet, unheroic subject has been read as an implicit counterpoint to the nationalist imagery most Japanese artists were producing as troops fought along the Chinese coast.

In 1940 he married Kiso Yoshida (née Katsura) and they soon had five sons.

Kiso, though she produced only a small number of her own woodblock prints, was trained in traditional upper-class Japanese arts and excelled particularly in bonseki, the art of miniature tray landscapes; around 1950 in Tokyo she helped found an association for the cultivation of bonseki. Within the Yoshida enterprise she served as its business director, responsible for recording the prints produced, running day-to-day commercial operations, and shipping prints to clients in Japan and abroad. When the Tōshi Yoshida family built a combined museum and holiday home in Atami in 1991–1992, a room was designed specifically for Kiso to create and display her bonseki work, alongside a scroll recording centuries of the Katsura family history.

== Wartime ==
Yoshida's adult career began under adverse circumstances. Yoshida was still an apprentice in the Yoshida family system. He had little, if any, artistic autonomy from his father. 1936 was the beginning of military dictatorship, under which art was under censorship. In 1943, Yoshida produced oil paintings that depict factory workers and civilians engaging in war production. After the war, because of economic hardship, Yoshida published seventeen landscape works in 1951 for American personnel and their wives.

== Postwar turn to abstract expressionism ==
The death of his father in 1950 marked Tōshi's total break from his past and from naturalism. On his father's death, Tōshi became head of the family, initially focusing on restoring its finances, which had suffered after the war, and took over management of the Yoshida studio, promoting his father's work and encouraging the expansion of the style Hiroshi had established. He soon resigned from the Taiheiyō Gakai, however, to join his brother Hodaka's Plus group, embracing a more modern and internationally oriented style of experimentation; Tōshi had earlier shielded Hodaka from their father's disapproval of abstraction by keeping secret that his brother had already been drawing abstract prints in the mid-1940s. In 1952, Yoshida began a series of abstract woodcuts, influenced by his brother, Hodaka Yoshida. In 1953, Tōshi traveled to the United States, Mexico, London, and the Near East. He made presentations in thirty museums and galleries in eighteen states. From 1954 to 1973, Yoshida made three hundred nonobjective prints.

== Friendship with Bill Zacha ==
In 1964, Yoshida met visiting American artist Bill Zacha. This led to Yoshida visiting and teaching at the Mendocino Art Center in 1971. After returning to Japan, Yoshida founded an art center in Miasa, Nagano. The friendship between Yoshida and Zacha became the basis for a sister city relationship between Mendocino and Miasa, formalized in 1980.

== Animal prints and Africa ==
In 1971, Yoshida returned to his innate affinity for animals and focused on birds and animals again. His Humming Bird and Fuchsia in 1971 was a prelude to the African works that he began the following year. From 1971 to 1994, until the last years of his life, Tōshi worked almost exclusively on animal prints. Having traveled to Africa in 1972, an experience that inspired him to capture the forces of nature in visual media, he produced nearly thirty woodcuts of African scenes alongside more than a dozen oil paintings. Tōshi was also a children's book illustrator. He wrote his own short stories and made illustrations in the Animal Picture Book (Dōbutsu ehon) series, to which he devoted himself from 1982 to 1993. Based on careful observation and scientific research, the first cycle follows three young lions who set off to hunt on their own, meeting in turn rhinoceroses, water buffalo, cattle, egrets, zebras, impalas, cheetahs, wildebeest, vultures, hyenas, a leopard and a porcupine, each of which rebuffs or intimidates them. Planned as twenty volumes but completed at seventeen, the series was acclaimed in both Japan and Europe, winning an award at the Bologna Children's Book Fair in 1984, the Yomiuri Shimbun's Nippon Prize and the Sankei Shimbun's art prize in 1985, and a culture prize in Évian, France.

Yoshida drew his subjects largely from his travels, which extended as far as Antarctica. In 1980 he opened a printmaking school in Nagano Prefecture, attended by a mix of international students; among them were Karyn Young, Carol Jessen, Sarah Brayer and Micah Schwaberow, who went on to become print artists in their own right. Tōshi Yoshida died of cancer in 1995.

== See also ==
- Yoshida family artists

== Further readings ==
- Allen, Laura W. A Japanese Legacy: Four Generations of Yoshida Family Artists. Minneapolis: Minneapolis Institute of Arts, Chicago: Art Media Resources (2002).
- Japanese Print Making: a handbook of Traditional & Modern Techniques. Preface by Oliver Statler.
- Skibbe, Eugene M. Yoshida Toshi: Nature, Art and Peace. Minnesota: Seascape Publications (1996).
- Yoshida, Toshi & Rei Yuki. Japanese Printmaking, A Handbook of Traditional & Modern Techniques. Rutland, Vermont & Tokyo, Japan: Charles E. Tuttle Co. Inc. (1966).
