= Kiso Yoshida =

Japanese artist

Kiso Yoshida (1919–2005) was a Japanese artist and the wife of Tōshi Yoshida and one of the artists in the important Yoshida family of Japanese artists. Unlike the others in the family, Kiso created only a few woodblock prints, but she excelled in the older, traditional arts of Japan. She had a quiet noble bearing and she played a key role in the Yoshida enterprise along with her husband.

Kiso was born in Niitsu, Niigata, into the Katsura family that long had ties to Japan's imperial family. Her father, who had been a part of the government there, owned large tracts of land noted for their rice production. Kiso learned all of the traditional feminine arts of the upper class, such as the tea ceremony, flower arranging, and others, but she excelled especially in bonseki. Bonseki is the ancient art of arranging pure white sand and small white rocks on a black lacquer tray, thus forming miniature landscapes and seascapes. The sand and rocks were carefully manipulated with feathers, small brushes, and spoons. Each scene was temporary, only for the moment. The sand and rocks would then be brushed together and returned to their small storage containers to be used again. In addition, Kiso learned a technique for mixing glue with the sand so that the miniature scene would adhere to paper, and thus have a more permanent form. About 1950 in Tokyo, Kiso helped initiate an association for the cultivation and perpetuation of bonseki art.

Tōshi and Kiso married in 1940 in Tokyo, and had five sons. Kiso helped her husband in the development of the Yoshida Studio by being its business manager, responsible for keeping record of the prints produced, carrying out basic business operations, and mailing prints to clients in Japan and other countries. Almost incidental to that she produced a few woodblock prints of her own, some clearly echoing her bonseki scenes.

When the Tōshi Yoshida family built their own combined museum and vacation home in 1991–1992 at Atami overlooking the ocean, a large glass case was installed to display the scroll on which is recorded the Katsura family history going back hundreds of years. Other rare objects from Kiso's parental home are also there. One room in the Atami building was designed especially for Kiso to make and display bonseki.
