= Yoshida =

- Pronunciation: Yoshida

Origin
- Origin: Japanese
- Meaning: lucky ricefield (吉田), fragrant ricefield (芳田)
- Region of origin: Japanese

Yoshida (written: 吉田 lit. "lucky ricefield") is the 11th most common Japanese surname. A less common variant is 芳田 (lit. "fragrant ricefield").

== Notable people with the surname ==
- Ai Yoshida, Japanese sailor
- Akari Yoshida (吉田 朱里; born 1996), Japanese idol, singer and model
- Akihiko Yoshida (吉田 明彦; born 1967), Japanese video game artist
- Akimi Yoshida (吉田 秋生; born 1956), Japanese manga artist
- Akio Yoshida (吉田 明生; born 1986), Japanese footballer
- Akira Yoshida (吉田 明; born 1971), Japanese rugby union player
- Akiyoshi Yoshida (吉田 昭義; born 1966), Japanese football
- Ami Yoshida (吉田 アミ; born 1976), Japanese singer
- Asami Yoshida (disambiguation), multiple people
- Ayako Yoshida (吉田 理子; born 1976), Japanese rower
- Ayomi Yoshida (吉田 亜世美; born 1958), Japanese artist
- Baret Yoshida (born 1975), American mixed martial artist
- Bill Yoshida (1921–2005), American comic book letterer
- Bungo Yoshida (吉田 文吾; 1934–2008), Japanese puppeteer
- Chinami Yoshida (吉田 知那美; born 1991), Japanese curler
- Chizuko Yoshida (吉田 千鶴子), Japanese artist
- Daihachi Yoshida (吉田 大八), Japanese film director
- Eisaku Yoshida (吉田 栄作; born 1969), Japanese actor and singer
- Emika Yoshida (吉田 恵美可; born 1985), Japanese javelin thrower
- Eri Yoshida (吉田 えり; born 1992), Japanese baseball player
- Fujio Yoshida (吉田 ふじを; 1887–1987), Japanese artist
- Yoshida Hanbei (吉田 半兵衛), 17th-century Japanese ukiyo-e artist
- Hatsusaburō Yoshida (吉田 初三郎; 1884–1955), Japanese cartographer
- Hayato Yoshida (吉田 隼人; born 1989), Japanese cyclist
- Hidehiko Yoshida (吉田 秀彦; born 1969), Japanese judoka and mixed martial artist
- Hidekazu Yoshida (吉田 秀和; 1913–2012), Japanese music critic and literary critic
- Hideko Yoshida (吉田 日出子; born 1944), Japanese actress
- Hirofumi Yoshida (吉田 裕史), Japanese conductor
- Hiromi Yoshida (吉田 博美; born 1949), Japanese politician
- Hiroshi Yoshida (吉田 博; 1876–1950), Japanese painter and printmaker
- Hiroshi Yoshida (footballer) (吉田 弘; born 1958), Japanese footballer and manager
- Hiroyuki Yoshida (吉田 裕幸; born 1969), Japanese footballer
- Hodaka Yoshida (吉田 穂高; 1926–1995), Japanese artist
- Isoya Yoshida (吉田 五十八; 1894–1974), Japanese architect
- Izumi Yoshida (吉田 泉; born 1949), Japanese politician
- Junki Yoshida, Japanese imigrant and founder of Yoshida Foods International
- Kaii Yoshida (吉田 海偉; born 1981), Chinese-born Japanese table tennis player
- Yoshida Kanetomo (吉田 兼倶; 1435–1511), Japanese Shinto priest
- Kanso Yoshida (1895–1973), Japanese-born British seaman
- Kazumasa Yoshida (吉田 一将; born 1989), Japanese baseball player
- Kei Yosida (芳田 奎), one of the physicists after which the RKKY interaction is named
- Keishin Yoshida (吉田 圭伸; born 1987), Japanese cross-country skier
- Keisuke Yoshida (director) (吉田 恵輔; born 1975), Japanese film director and screenwriter
- Keisuke Yoshida (swimmer) (吉田 啓祐; born 2000), Japanese swimmer
- Ken Yoshida (吉田 謙; born 1970), Japanese footballer and manager
- Ken'ichi Yoshida (disambiguation), multiple people
- Kenji Yoshida (吉田 健二; 1935–2003), Japanese anime producer and illustrator
- Yoshida Kenkō (1283–1350), monk, author
- Kentaro Yoshida (吉田 賢太郎; born 1980), Japanese footballer
- Kiichi Yoshida (吉田 喜一; 1919–1944), Japanese swimmer
- Kiso Yoshida (1919–2005), Japanese artist
- Yoshida Kiyonari (吉田 清成; died 1891), Japanese samurai and diplomat
- Kiyoshi Yoshida (吉田 潔; born 1964), Japanese composer
- Kō Yoshida (吉田 宏; 1913–2009), member of the World Scout Committee, World Scout Foundation, and the International Commissioner of the Boy Scouts of Nippon
- Kōsaku Yosida (吉田 耕作; 1909–1990), Japanese mathematician
- Kōta Yoshida (吉田 浩太), Japanese film director
- Kōtarō Yoshida (disambiguation), multiple people
- Kurumi Yoshida (吉田 胡桃; born 1991), Japanese synchronized swimmer
- Makito Yoshida (吉田 眞紀人; born 1992), Japanese footballer
- Makiko Yoshida (吉田 真希子; born 1976), Japanese hurdler
- Makito Yoshida (吉田 眞紀人; born 1992), Japanese footballer
- Mami Yoshida (吉田 真未; born 1986), Japanese volleyball player
- Mariko Yoshida (吉田 万里子; born 1970), Japanese professional wrestler
- Mariko Yoshida (volleyball) (吉田 真理子; born 1954), Japanese volleyball player
- Masaki Yoshida (吉田 正樹; born 1984), Japanese footballer
- Masami Yoshida (disambiguation), multiple people
- Masao Yoshida (disambiguation), multiple people
- Masataka Yoshida (吉田 正尚; born 1993), Japanese baseball player
- Masayoshi Yoshida (吉田 匡良; born 1982), Japanese footballer
- Masujiro Yoshida (吉田 増次郎; 1867–1942), Imperial Japanese Navy admiral
- Maya Yoshida (吉田 麻也; born 1988), Japanese footballer
- Mayumi Yoshida (吉田 真弓; born 1982), Japanese voice actress
- Megumu Yoshida (吉田 恵; born 1973), Japanese footballer and manager
- Metal Yoshida (吉田 メタル; born 1971), Japanese actor and musician
- Mitsuaki Yoshida (吉田 光昭; born 1939), Japanese virologist
- Mitsunori Yoshida (吉田 光範; born 1962), Japanese footballer
- Mitsuru Yoshida (吉田 満; 1923–1979), Imperial Japanese Navy officer and writer
- Yoshida Mitsuyoshi (吉田 光由; 1598–1672), Japanese mathematician
- Miwa Yoshida (吉田 美和; born 1965), Japanese musician
- Miyako Yoshida (吉田 都; born 1965), Japanese ballet dancer
- Mizuho Yoshida (吉田 瑞穂; bron 1965), Japanese actor
- Motohiro Yoshida (吉田 宗弘; born 1974), Japanese footballer
- Naoki Yoshida (吉田 直樹; born 1973), Japanese video game producer, director and designer
- Naoya Yoshida (吉田 直矢; born 1994), Japanese footballer
- Nobuko Yoshida (吉田 展子), Japanese computer scientist
- Nonoko Yoshida (吉田 野乃子), Japanese saxophonist
- Ray Yoshida (1930–2009), American artist
- Reiko Yoshida (吉田 玲子), Japanese screenwriter and manga artist
- Rihoko Yoshida (吉田 理保子; born 1949), Japanese voice actress
- Rikio Yoshida (吉田 力雄; born 1939), Japanese Nordic combined skier
- Riko Yoshida (吉田 里琴; born 1999), Japanese actress. She changed her stage name to Ai Yoshikawa in 2017.
- Rinne Yoshida (吉田 凜音; born 2000), Japanese idol, singer and rapper
- Rokuzaemon Yoshida (吉田 六左エ門; born 1939), Japanese politician
- Rui Yoshida (1864–1954), Japanese artist
- Ruiko Yoshida (吉田 ルイ子; born 1938), Japanese photojournalist
- Ruriko Yoshida, Japanese-American mathematician and statistician
- Ryoichi Yoshida (吉田 良一; born 1965), Japanese sprinter
- Sachio Yoshida (吉田 幸生; born 1980), Japanese footballer
- Saori Yoshida (吉田 沙保里; born 1982), Japanese sport wrestler
- Satoru Yoshida (吉田 悟; born 1970), Japanese footballer
- Sayuri Yoshida (吉田 小百合; born 1966), Japanese voice actress
- Seiji Yoshida (吉田 清治; 1913–2000), Japanese writer and communist
- Seiko Yoshida (吉田 聖子; born 1986), Japanese voice actress
- Sensha Yoshida, manga artist, known as the author of Utsurun Desu.
- Setsuko Yoshida (吉田 節子; born 1942), Japanese volleyball player
- Shigeru Yoshida (吉田 茂; 1878–1967), Japanese diplomat, politician and Prime Minister of Japan
- Shigeru Yoshida (bureaucrat) (吉田 茂; 1885–1954), Japanese diplomat and politician
- Shintaro Yoshida (由田 慎太郎; born 1981), Japanese baseball player
- Yoshida Shōin (吉田 松陰; 1830–1859), Japanese scholar
- Shu Yoshida (baseball) (吉田 嵩; born 1996), Japanese baseball player
- Shuhei Yoshida (吉田 修平; born 1964), Japanese businessman
- Shuichi Yoshida (吉田 修一; born 1968), Japanese writer
- Shuji Yoshida (吉田 修司; born 1966), Japanese baseball player and coach
- Soyoka Yoshida (吉田 爽葉香; born 2004), Japanese entertainer
- Sumire Yoshida (吉田 菫; born 1992), Japanese musician
- Sunao Yoshida (吉田 直; 1969–2004), pen-name of Sunao Matsumoto, Japanese writer
- Syoh Yoshida (吉田 翔; born 1984), Japanese artist
- Tadatomo Yoshida (吉田 忠智), Japanese politician
- Taisei Yoshida (吉田 大成; born 1995), Japanese baseball player
- Takahisa Yoshida (吉田 孝久; born 1970), Japanese high jumper
- Takao Yoshida (吉田 貴男; born 1973), better known as Taka Michinoku, Japanese professional wrestler
- Takashi Yoshida (吉田 隆司; born 1982), better known as Cyber Kong, Japanese professional wrestler
- Takashi Yoshida (comedian) (吉田 敬; born 1973), Japanese comedian
- Takayuki Yoshida (吉田 孝行; born 1977), Japanese footballer
- Takeshi Yoshida, Japanese engineer
- Takuro Yoshida (吉田 拓郎; born 1946), Japanese singer-songwriter
- Tamao Yoshida (吉田 玉男; 1919–2006), Japanese puppeteer
- Tatsuma Yoshida (吉田 達磨; born 1974), Japanese footballer
- Tatsuo Yoshida (吉田 竜夫; 1932–1977), Japanese illustrator and character designer
- Tatsuya Yoshida (吉田 達也), Japanese musician
- Tetsuro Yoshida (吉田 鉄郎; 1894–1956), Japanese architect
- Tome Yoshida (吉田 とめ; 1876–1963), Japanese nurse
- Tomizo Yoshida (吉田 富三; 1903–1973), Japanese pathologist
- Tomokazu Yoshida (吉田 友一; born 1982), Japanese actor
- Tomoki Yoshida (吉田 智紀; born 1982), Japanese rugby union player
- Tomoko Yoshida (吉田 知子; born 1934), Japanese writer
- Toru Yoshida (吉田 暢; born 1965), Japanese footballer and manager
- Tōshi Yoshida (吉田 遠志; 1911–1995), Japanese printmaker
- Toshimitsu Yoshida (吉田 寿光; born 1963), Japanese football referee
- Toshitada Yoshida (吉田 敏忠; born 1947), Japanese sport wrestler
- Yoshida Tōyō (吉田 東洋; 1816–1862), Japanese samurai
- Toyoharu Yoshida (吉田 豊治; 1940–2023), Japanese manga artist and businessman known as Ippei Kuri
- Tsukasa Yoshida (芳田 司; born 1995), Japanese judoka
- Yasuhiro Yoshida (吉田 康弘; born 1969), Japanese footballer and manager
- Yasushi Yoshida (吉田 靖; born 1960), Japanese footballer and manager
- Yasutaka Yoshida (吉田 安孝; born 1966), Japanese footballer
- Yō Yoshida (吉田 羊), Japanese actress
- Yoshihito Yoshida (吉田 義人; born 1969), Japanese rugby union player
- Yoshikatsu Yoshida (吉田 義勝; born 1941), Japanese sport wrestler
- Yoshio Yoshida (disambiguation), multiple people
- Yoshishige Yoshida (吉田 喜重; 1933–2022), Japanese film director and screenwriter
- Yoshiyuki Yoshida (吉田 善行; born 1974), Japanese mixed martial artist
- Yugo Yoshida (吉田 雄悟; born 1983), Japanese sailor
- Yuka Yoshida (吉田 友佳; born 1976), Japanese tennis player
- Yuka Yoshida (cricketer) (born 1989), Japanese women cricketer
- Yuki Yoshida, Canadian film producer
- Yurika Yoshida (吉田 夕梨花; born 1993), Japanese curler
- Yuta Yoshida (吉田 裕太; born 1991), Japanese baseball player
- Yutaka Yoshida (吉田 豊; born 1990), Japanese footballer
- Yūto Yoshida (吉田 雄人; born 1975), Japanese politician
- Yuya Yoshida (吉田 優也; born 1989), Japanese judoka
- Zengo Yoshida (吉田 善吾; 1885–1966), Imperial Japanese Navy admiral
- Luka Yoshida-Martin (born 2001), Australian rules footballer

== Fictional characters ==
- Ayumi Yoshida (吉田 歩美), a character in the manga series Detective Conan
- Chizuru Yoshida (吉田 千鶴), a character in the manga series Kimi ni Todoke
- Jin Yoshida, a character in the video game Soma
- Kazumi Yoshida (吉田 一美), a character in the light novel series Shakugan no Shana
- Leyu Yoshida (吉田 玲優), better known as Sunpyre, a character in Marvel Comics
- Miki Yoshida, a character in the OEL manga series Miki Falls
- Shiro Yoshida (吉田 四郎), better known as Sunfire, a character in Marvel Comics
- Taisei Yoshida (吉田 大成), a character in the manga series Assassination Classroom
- Yuki Yoshida (吉田 友紀), a character in the light novel series Is This a Zombie?
- Masaki Yoshida (吉田 茉咲), a secondary character in the manga WataMote
- Saki Yoshida (吉田咲), the main character of the infamous hentai manga Metamorphosis (sometimes called Emergence)
- Yoshida Shouyou, one of the most important character in the manga and anime series Gintama (being the main character, Gintoki Sakata's teacher) created by Hideaki Sorachi. He is based on Yoshida Shoin.
- Hirofumi Yoshida (博文 吉田) supporting character, during the first and second part of Chainsaw Man, who’s introduced in the International Assassin’s arc

== See also ==
- Yoshida Brothers, Shamisen musicians
