= Masao =

- Gender: Male

Origin
- Origin: Japanese
- Meaning: Different meanings depending on the kanji used

Masao (written: 正雄, 正夫, 正生, 正男, 正郎, 雅雄, 雅央, 雅夫, 雅勇, 雅男, 昌雄, 昌夫, 昌男, 昌朗, 昌郎, 昌大, 政雄, 政夫, 政男, 政於, 征夫, 優夫, 聖雄, 利生, 将雄, 将夫 or 眞男) is a masculine Japanese given name. Notable people with the name include:

- Masao Abe (阿部 正雄; 1915–2006), Japanese philosopher and writer
- Masao Adachi (足立 正生; born 1939), Japanese screenwriter and film director
- Masao Akamatsu (赤松 正雄; born 1945), Japanese politician
- Masao Akashi (明石 昌夫; 1957–2025), Japanese musical arranger
- Amatsukaze Masao (天津風 征夫; 1937–2013), Japanese sumo wrestler
- Masao Arai (荒井 政雄; born 1949), Japanese sport wrestler
- Masao Azuma (東 雅雄; born 1971), Japanese motorcycle racer
- Baba Masao (馬場 正郎; 1892–1947), Japanese general
- Masao Doi, Japanese academic
- Masao Fujii (藤井 将雄; 1968–2000), Japanese baseball player
- Masao Gozu (郷津 雅夫; born 1946), Japanese photographer and sculptor
- Inaba Masao, Japanese military officer and rebel
- Masao Haji (土師 政雄; 1925–1998), Japanese activist and academic
- Masao Harada (原田 正夫; 1912–2000), Japanese triple jumper
- Masao Horino (堀野 正雄; 1907–2000), Japanese photographer
- Masao Ichihara (市原 正雄; 1913–1977), Japanese sprinter
- Masao Inoue (actor) (井上 正夫; 1881–1950), Japanese actor and film director
- Masao Inoue (wrestler) (井上 雅央; born 1970), Japanese professional wrestler
- Masao Ito (伊藤 正男; born 1928), Japanese neuroscientist
- Masao Iwasato (岩里 政男; born 1923), former President of the Republic of China (Taiwan)
- Masao Kanamitsu (1943–2011), Japanese American meteorologist
- Masao Kato (加藤 正夫; 1947–2004), Japanese Go player
- Masao Kawai (河合 雅雄; born 1924), Japanese primatologist
- Masao Kiba (木場 昌雄; born 1974), Japanese footballer
- Masao Kida (木田 優夫; born 1968), Japanese baseball player
- Masao Kinoshita (木下 政雄), Japanese businessman
- Masao Kitagawa (北川 政夫; 1910–1995), Japanese botanist
- Kiyonomori Masao (清の盛 政夫; 1935–2019), Japanese sumo wrestler
- Masao Kobayashi (小林 正夫; born 1947), Japanese politician
- Masao Koga (古賀 政男; 1904–1978), Japanese composer and guitarist
- Masao Komatsu (小松政夫; 1942–2020), Japanese actor
- Masao Kotani (小谷 正雄; 1906–1993), Japanese theoretical physicist
- Masao Kume (久米 正雄; 1891–1952), Japanese playwright, writer and poet
- Masao Maeda (前田 政雄; 1904–1974), Japanese printmaker
- Masao Maruyama (film producer) (丸山 正雄; born 1941), Japanese animator and film producer
- Masao Maruyama (Japanese Army officer) (丸山 政男; 1889–1957), Japanese general
- Masao Maruyama (scholar) (丸山 眞男; 1914–1996), Japanese political scientist and historian
- Masao Mimatsu (三松 正夫; 1888–1977), Japanese volcanologist
- Masao Miyamoto (宮本 政於; 1948–1999), Japanese psychiatrist
- Masao Miyoshi (三好 将夫; 1928–2009), Japanese sociologist
- Masao Morinaka (森中 聖雄; born 1974), Japanese baseball player
- Masao Mukai (向井 正雄; born 1958), Japanese conductor
- Masao Murano (村野 正夫; born 1935), Japanese ice hockey player
- Masao Murata (村田 正夫; born 1964), Japanese judoka
- Masao Nakabori (中堀 正夫), Japanese cinematographer
- Masao Nakamura (中村 正雄; 1892–1939), Japanese general
- Masao Nakayama (中山 利生; 1941–2011), Japanese politician and diplomat
- Masao Nozawa (野澤 正雄), Japanese footballer
- Masao Ohba (大場 政夫; 1949–1973), Japanese boxer
- Masao Ono (大埜 正雄; 1923–2001), Japanese footballer
- Masao Orihara (折原 昌夫; born 1969), Japanese professional wrestler
- Masao Sasakibara (佐々木原 正夫; 1921–2005), Japanese World War II flying ace
- Masao Sen (千 昌夫; 1947), Japanese singer
- Masao Shimizu (清水 将夫; 1908–1975), Japanese actor
- Masao Suenaga (末永 正雄; born 1978), Japanese drifting driver
- Masao Sugimoto (born 1967), Japanese footballer
- Masao Sugiuchi (杉内 雅男; 1920–2017), Japanese Go player
- Masao Takada, Japanese footballer
- Masao Takagi (高木 正雄; 1917–1979), former President of South Korea
- Masao Takahashi (born 1929), Canadian judoka
- Masao Takemoto (竹本 正男; 1919–2007), Japanese artistic gymnast
- Masao Takenaka (1925–2006), Japanese theologian
- Masao Takiyama (滝山 正夫), Japanese television producer
- Masao Tsuchida, Japanese baseball player
- Masao Tsukada (塚田 正夫; 1914–1977), Japanese shogi player
- Masao Uchino (内野 正雄; born 1934), Japanese footballer and manager
- Masao Urino (売野 雅勇; born 1951), Japanese lyricist, screenwriter and film director
- Masao Watanabe (渡辺 正夫; 1888–1950), Japanese general
- Masao Yagi (八木正生; 1932–1991), Japanese jazz musician
- Masao Yamaguchi (山口 昌男; 1931–2013), Japanese anthropologist
- Masao Yamamoto (山本 昌男; born 1957), Japanese photographer
- Masao Yoshida (disambiguation), multiple people
