= Sōfuku-ji =

Sōfuku-ji (崇福寺) could refer to one of four Buddhist temples in Japan:

- Sōfuku-ji (Fukuoka)
- Sōfuku-ji (Gifu)
- Sōfuku-ji (Nagasaki)
- Sōfuku-ji (Ōtsu)
