= 博文 =

博文 is an Asian masculine given name meaning "big, word". It may refer to:

- Bowen (disambiguation)#People with the given name, Chinese masculine given name
- Hirofumi, Japanese masculine given name
- Parks M. Coble Jr. (柯博文; born 1946), academic specializing in the political, economic, social and business history of 20th century China
