= Hirofumi =

- Gender: Male

Origin
- Origin: Japanese
- Meaning: Different meanings depending on the kanji used

Hirofumi (written: 弘文, 浩文, 浩史, 博文, 博史, 宏文, 浩文, 広文, 洋文, 拓史 or 裕史) is a masculine Japanese given name. Notable people with the name include:

- Hirofumi Arai (新井 浩文; born 1979), Japanese actor
- Hirofumi Araki (荒木 宏文; born 1983), Japanese actor and singer
- Hirofumi Fukuzawa (福沢 博文; born 1970), Japanese actor
- Hirofumi Hayashi (林 博史; born 1955), Japanese historian
- Hirofumi Hirano (平野 博文; born 1949), Japanese politician
- Hirofumi Ishigaki (石垣 広文; born 1963), Japanese actor
- Hirofumi Itō (伊藤 博文; born 1960), Japanese shogi player
- Hirofumi Matsuda (松田 博文), Japanese judoka
- Hirofumi Miyase (宮瀬 博文; born 1971), Japanese golfer
- Hirofumi Moriyasu (森安 洋文; born 1985), American-born Japanese footballer
- Hirofumi Nakasone (中曽根 弘文; born 1945), Japanese politician
- Hirofumi Nojima (野島 裕史; born 1973), Japanese voice actor
- Hirofumi Numata (沼田 宏文; born 1952), Japanese basketball player
- Hirofumi Otsuka (大塚 博文; born 1947), Japanese speed skater
- Hirofumi Ryu (笠 浩史; born 1965), Japanese politician
- Hirofumi Sakai (酒井 浩文; born 1965), Japanese racewalker
- Hirofumi Uzawa (宇沢 弘文; born 1928), Japanese economist
- Hirofumi Suga (comedian) (菅 広文; born 1976), Japanese comedian
- Hirofumi Suga (Japanese garden designer) (菅 宏文; born 1972), Japanese garden designer and landscape architect
- Hirofumi Watanabe (渡部 博文; born 1987), Japanese footballer
- Hirofumi Yamashita (山下 弘文; 1934–2000), Japanese ichthyologist and environmentalist
- Hirofumi Yoshida (吉田 裕史), Japanese conductor
- Hirofumi Yoshimura (吉村 洋文), Japanese politician

== See also ==
Hirobumi is an older pronunciation of modern Hirofumi:

- Hirobumi Itō
- Hirobumi Watanabe
