= Ōmori Harutoyo =

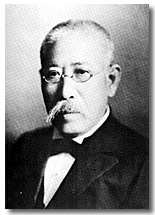
Ōmori Harutoyo

Ōmori Harutoyo (大森 治豊, December 20, 1852 - February 19, 1912) was a Japanese surgeon who became the first president of the Fukuoka Medical College that was founded in 1903 as a branch of the Medical Faculty of Kyōto University (Kyōto teikoku daigaku Fukuoka ika-daigaku, now the Faculty of Medicine, Kyushu University).

Ōmori was born in Edo, but he grew up in the domain Kaminoyama (Dewa province, nowadays Yamagata prefecture) where his father Ōmori Kaishun served as a physician to lord Matsudaira Nobumichi. In 1879 he graduated from Tokyo University; the same year he went to a new post in the newly established Fukuoka Medical School. In 1888 when this school was abolished, he was appointed as the first director of the Fukuoka Prefectural Hospital. In 1885, he performed the first cesarean operation in Japan. Dr. Omori laid the foundation for Kyushu University Faculty of Medicine before retiring in 1909. He did from a kidney trouble and was buried in the Sōfuku-Temple (Sōfuku-ji (Fukuoka) next to the campus of the medical faculty.

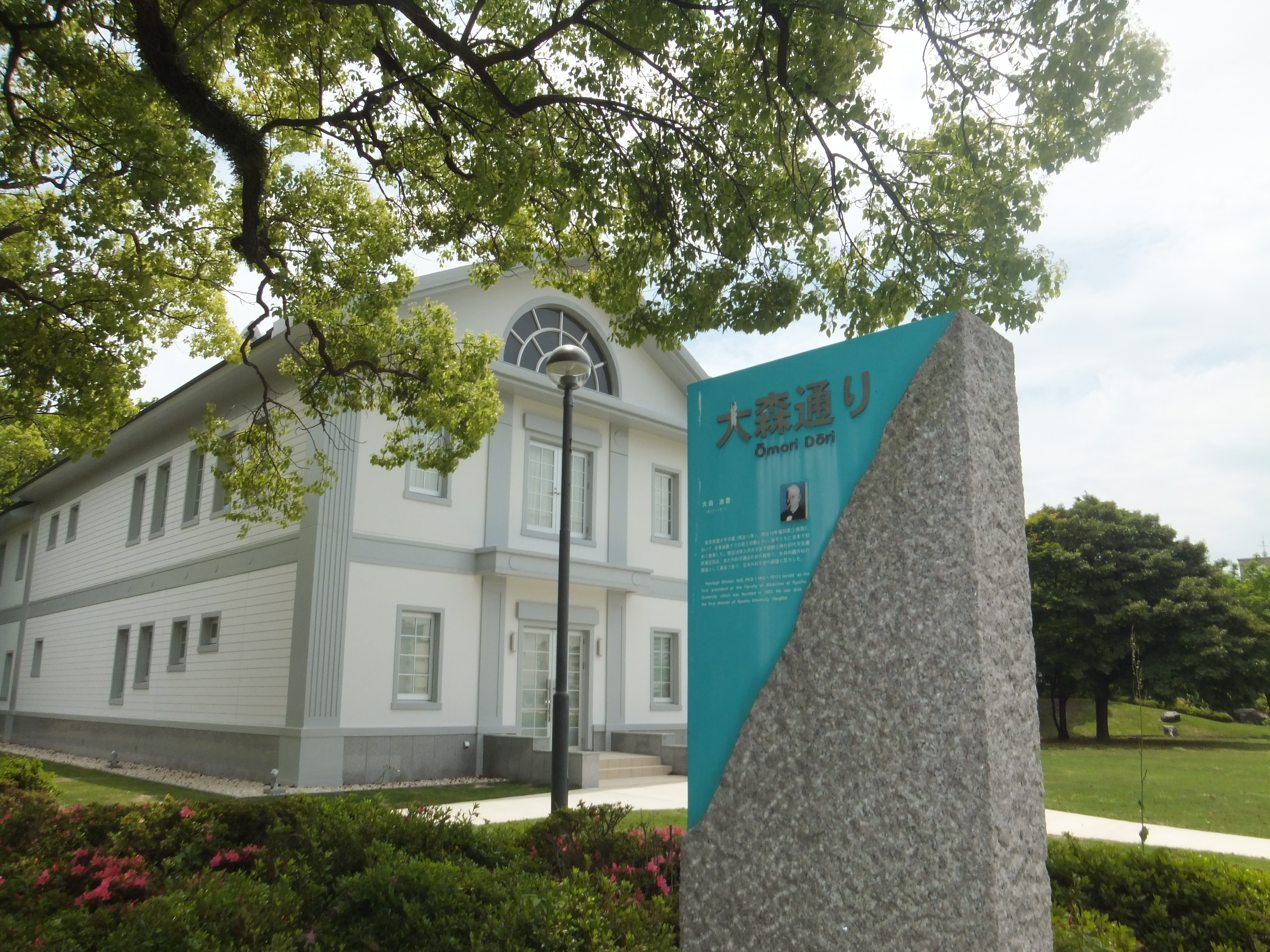
Ōmori memorial stone at the Ōmori-Street and the Kyushu University Medical History Museum (Maidashi-Campus)

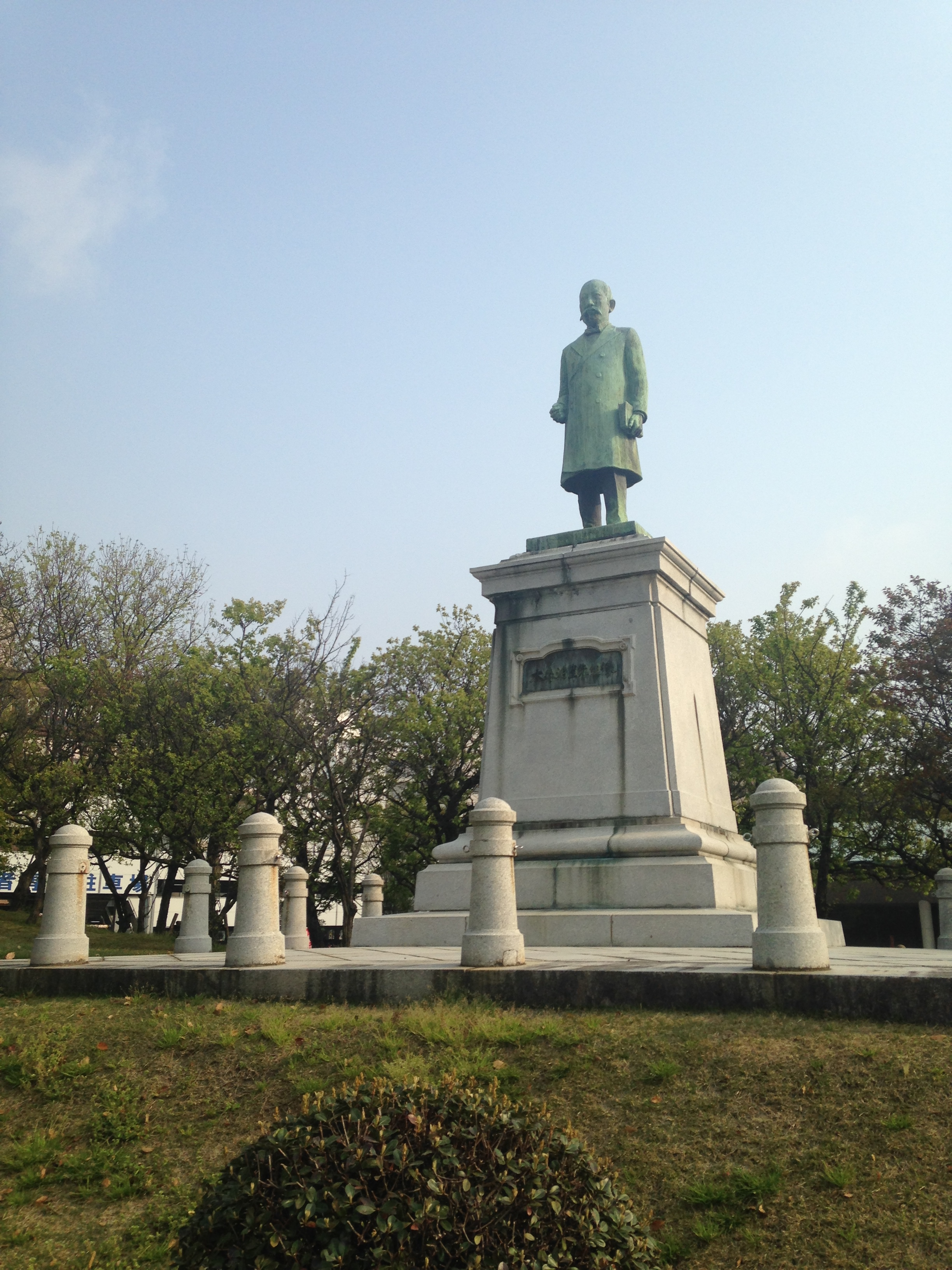
Statue of Ōmori Harutoyo near the university hospital

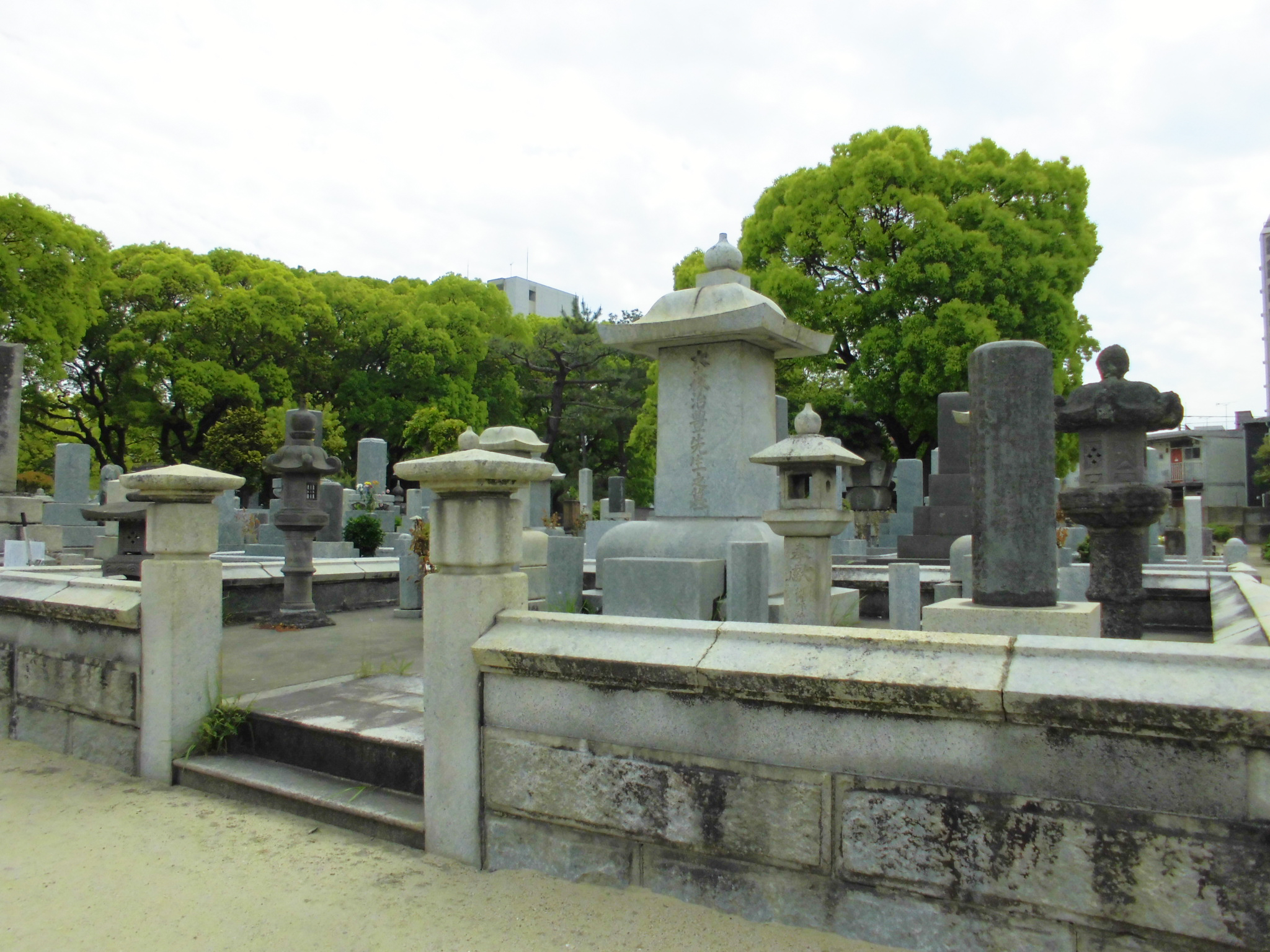
Grave of Ōmori Harutoyo in the graveyard of the Sōfuku-Temple)

== See also ==
- Tome Yoshida, a Japanese nurse
