= Masao Kanamitsu =

Japanese-American atmospheric scientist (1943-2011)

Masao Kanamitsu (November 6, 1943, in Kumamoto, Japan – August 17, 2011, in Del Mar, California) was a Japanese-American atmospheric scientist working in the field of data assimilation. His research greatly influenced global and regional climate change studies including development of breakthrough reanalysis and downscaling datasets and weather forecasting studies. He was the co-author of one of the most cited geophysics paper in his time.

Kanamitsu was born in 1943 and was raised in Sapporo. He did his B.S. and M. Sc. in 1968 at Hokkaido University, Japan and M.Sc. and Ph.D. in 1975 at Florida State University. He was one of the large group of Japanese scientists who after the World War II greatly contributed to the development of the dynamic meteorology in the US and in the World including Syukuro Manabe, Taroh Matsuno, Kikuro Miyakoda, and Akio Arakawa. He served as a Forecaster at the Japan Meteorological Agency, as a leader of the Global Modeling Branch, Development Division, and later as an Acting Chief of the Prediction Branch at the Climate Prediction Center of the National Meteorological Center. In 2001 he moved to Scripps Institution of Oceanography where he worked for the rest of his life. He had a group of young researchers working with him.

Kanamitsu was instrumental in creating one of the most successful datasets used in global change studies - the NCEP/NCAR Reanalysis for which he received a Group Gold Medal from the Department of Commerce in 1997. His 1996 reanalysis paper is one of the most celebrated papers in atmospheric science and geosciences - at the time of his death this paper was cited 7985 times.

His publications report ambitious, multiyear in making, and extensive project to develop regional-scale climate change dataset based on the NCEP–NCAR reanalysis for the period 1948–2005. This downscaling paved the way for local scale understanding of climate changes. In Dynamical Downscaling of Global Analysis and Simulation over the Northern Hemisphere he worked out a problem of how to produce meteorological dataset such as winds, pressures, or temperature on fine scale (say every 10 km) if the measurements are performed every 200 km. This led to a concept of dynamical downscaling of climate analysis using regional models.

He served as an editor for the Journal of the Meteorological Society of Japan (1980–1985) and the Monthly Weather Review (1991–1993). He was active scientifically to the end of his very productive life. At the time of his death he was a researcher at Scripps Institution of Oceanography where in relatively short time of about 10 years he wrote 35 papers. Kanamitsu was survived by his wife Mariko and his daughter Tomoko. He enjoyed hiking in various mountain ranges around Japan, United States and Europe. He loved dogs. He received Meteorological Society of Japan award in 1983. He was known as Kana among his friends.
