= Ken'ichi Yoshida =

Ken'ichi or Kenichi Yoshida may refer to:

- Ken'ichi Yoshida (literary scholar) (1912–1977), literary critic, author and scholar of English literature
- Kenichi Yoshida (animator) (born 1969), animator and character designer
- One of the Yoshida Brothers, shamisen musician
