= Yoshio Yoshida =

Yoshio Yoshida may refer to:

- Yoshio Yoshida (baseball) (吉田 義男, 1933–2025), Japanese baseball player and manager
- Yoshio Yoshida (pilot) (吉田 好雄, 1921 – before 2000), Japanese World War II flying ace
