= Asami Yoshida =

Asami Yoshida may refer to:

- Asami Yoshida (basketball) (吉田 亜沙美, born 1987), Japanese basketball player
- Asami Yoshida (voice actress) (吉田 麻実), Japanese voice actress
