= Masao Haji =

Japanese political activist, mathematics lecturer and critic

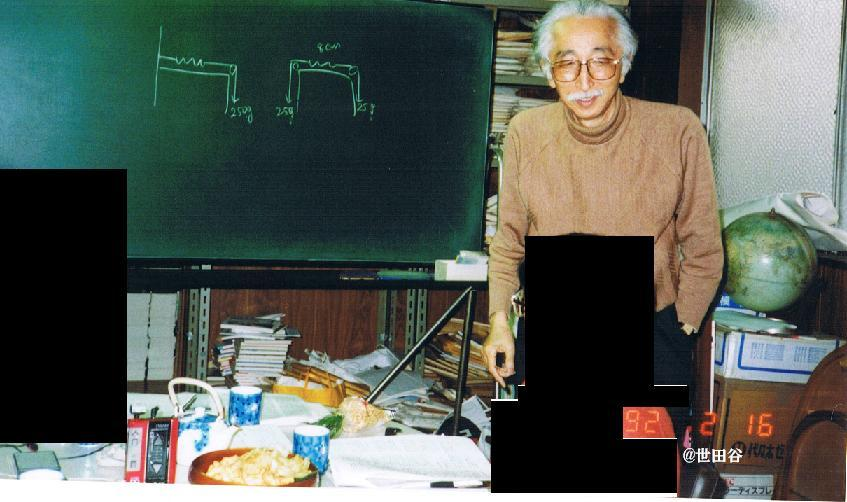
Haji-san's lecture at setagaya

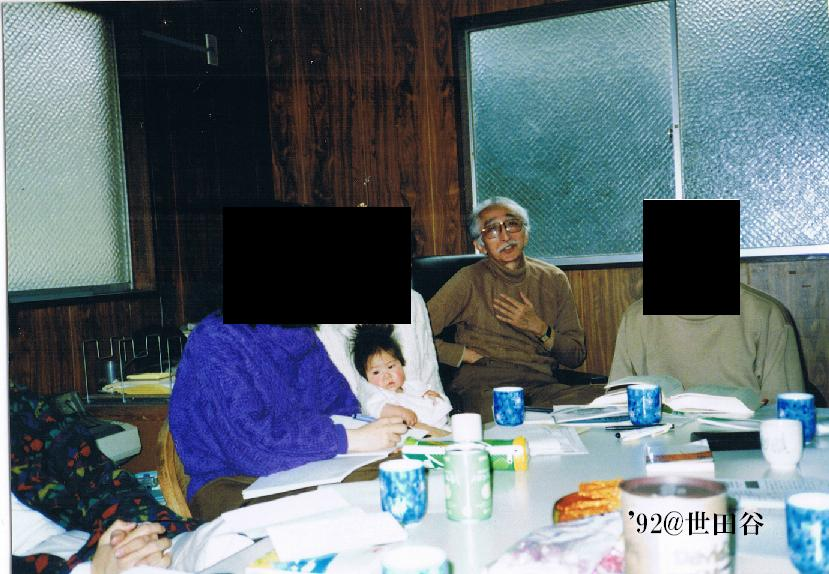
Haji's Home

Masao Haji (土師 政雄, Haji Masao, September 27, 1925 – June 9, 1998) was a Japanese political activist, mathematics lecturer and critic. He also wrote books under the name Ryūsuke Nomi (野見隆介, Nomi Ryusuke). He was chair of mathematics at the correspondence-course "Z-kai", and taught at the three top exam preparation schools (juku): Yoyogi Seminar, Sundai Preparatory School and Kawai Juku Groupwork.

== Career ==
For many years, he was responsible for the "basic mathematics seminar" at Yoyogi exam preparation school. He was a lecturer in Oubun-Sha company's "University entrance exam radio". Oubun-Sha was the author of the "fundamental issues lecture" and "standard issue lecture" series and the author of "training" series of the Zoushin-kai Publishing House, such as Aleph's "Calculus Lab".

He gave counseling to young people, including homeless youth.

== Personal life ==
He graduated from the Department of Engineering of the University of Tokyo.

Haji graduated from the kyu-sei-ichi-koukou (currently, University of Tokyo liberal arts).

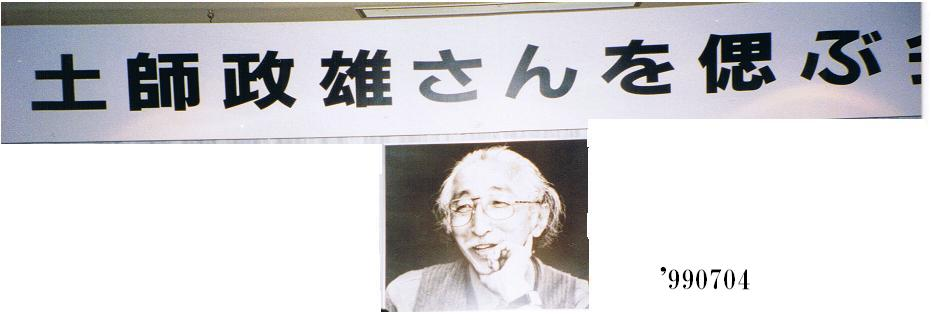
Haji-san Memorial event

In his youth he suffered from tuberculosis and recovered but sometimes had hoarseness or cough.

He is buried in Aoyama cemetery in Minato-ku, Tokyo.

Haji was involved in the "Peace to Vietnam" committee.

== Publications ==
- Masao Haji. "Han-sugaku-riron" (Futohsha, 1977) ISBN B000J8S3KC
- Masao Haji. "Koukou-muyou-no-Daigaku-Shingaku-Hou" (Sanichi-syobou, 1983) ISBN B000J7BLYS
- Masao Haji. "Sugaku1 Hyoujun-Mondai-seikou" (Oubun-sha, 1985) ISBN 978-4010313213
- Masao Haji. "Kisokaiseki-hyoujyun-mondai-seikou" (Oubun-sha, 1996) ISBN 978-4010313701
