= Tome Yoshida =

Japanese nurse (1876–1963)

- Born: 1876; Fukuoka Prefecture, Japan
- Died: 1963 (aged 86–87)
- Occupation: Nurse

Tome Yoshida (吉田 とめ, Yoshida Tome; 1876–1963) was a Japanese nurse. She was born in 1876 in Fukuoka Prefecture and in 1895 entered the Fukuoka Kenritsu Byōin Kango Yōseijo (福岡県立病院看護養成所, Fukuoka Prefectural Hospital Nurses' Training School).

== Career ==
Hospital director Ōmori Harutoyo, gave her a chance to oversee education inland, after her graduation in 1903. Fukuoka Ika Daigaku (福岡医科大学, Fukuoka Medical School) was established, she was appointed chief clinical nurse and after it was commissioned she became general head nurse She worked to develop a nursing school. With construction of diagnosis and treatment departments, she became the chief nurse of the department of ophthalmology, dermatology and otorhinolaryngology.

In 1908, she held Kyūshū Digaku Bukkyōiku Seinenkai (九州大学佛教育青年会, Kyushu University Buddhist Young Men's Educational Association) retreats for young nurses, naming the retreat Wakaba-kai (若葉会). These retreats came to symbolize the nurse. She published a collection of haiku.

In 1933, she retired from nursing and spent the rest of her life doing reading or making haiku in Fukuoka City Hirao lodge. After retiring, she published Wakaba (若葉) magazine, and worked to develop the study of nursing ethics for Kyushu University.

== Death and legacy ==
In 1963, she died at the age of 92. In the same year Kyushu University made a bust of her, Yoshida Tome joshi no zō (吉田とめ女史之像, Statue of lady Tome Yoshida), to honor her achievements in celebration of the university's 60th anniversary.

== See also ==
- List of nurses
