= Kōtarō Yoshida =

Kōtarō Yoshida may refer to:

- Kōtarō Yoshida (martial artist) (1883–1966), Japanese martial artist
- Kōtarō Yoshida (actor) (born 1959), Japanese actor
