= Sōfuku-ji (Fukuoka) =

Buddhist temple in Fukuoka Prefecture, Japan

Sōfuku-ji 崇福寺
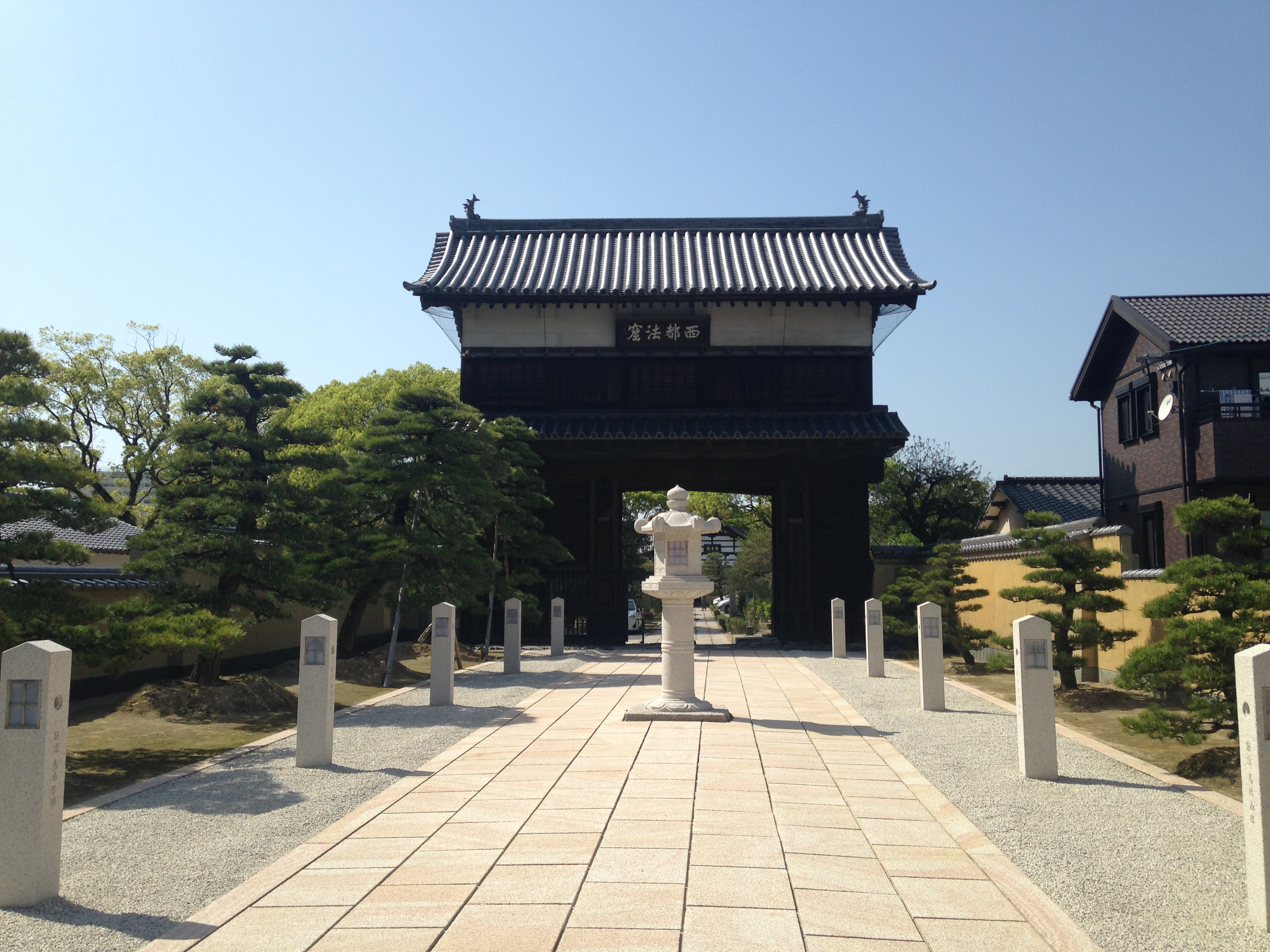
- Main Gate, formerly the gate of Fukuoka Castle

Religion
- Affiliation: Daitoku-ji Rinzai
- Deity: Shaka Nyorai (Śākyamuni)

Location
- Location: 4-Chōme-7-79 Chiyo, Hakata-ku, Fukuoka, Fukuoka Prefecture
- Country: Japan
- Interactive map of Sōfuku-ji 崇福寺
- Coordinates: 33°36′20.59″N 130°24′49.43″E

Architecture
- Founder: Tan'e
- Completed: 1240

Sōfuku-ji (崇福寺) is a Rinzai temple in Hakata-ku, Fukuoka, Japan. Its honorary sangō prefix is Yokodakezan (横岳山). The temple was founded by the monk Tan'e (湛慧) in Dazaifu in 1240, but was moved to its present location in 1600 after it became the Kuroda family temple.

== History ==
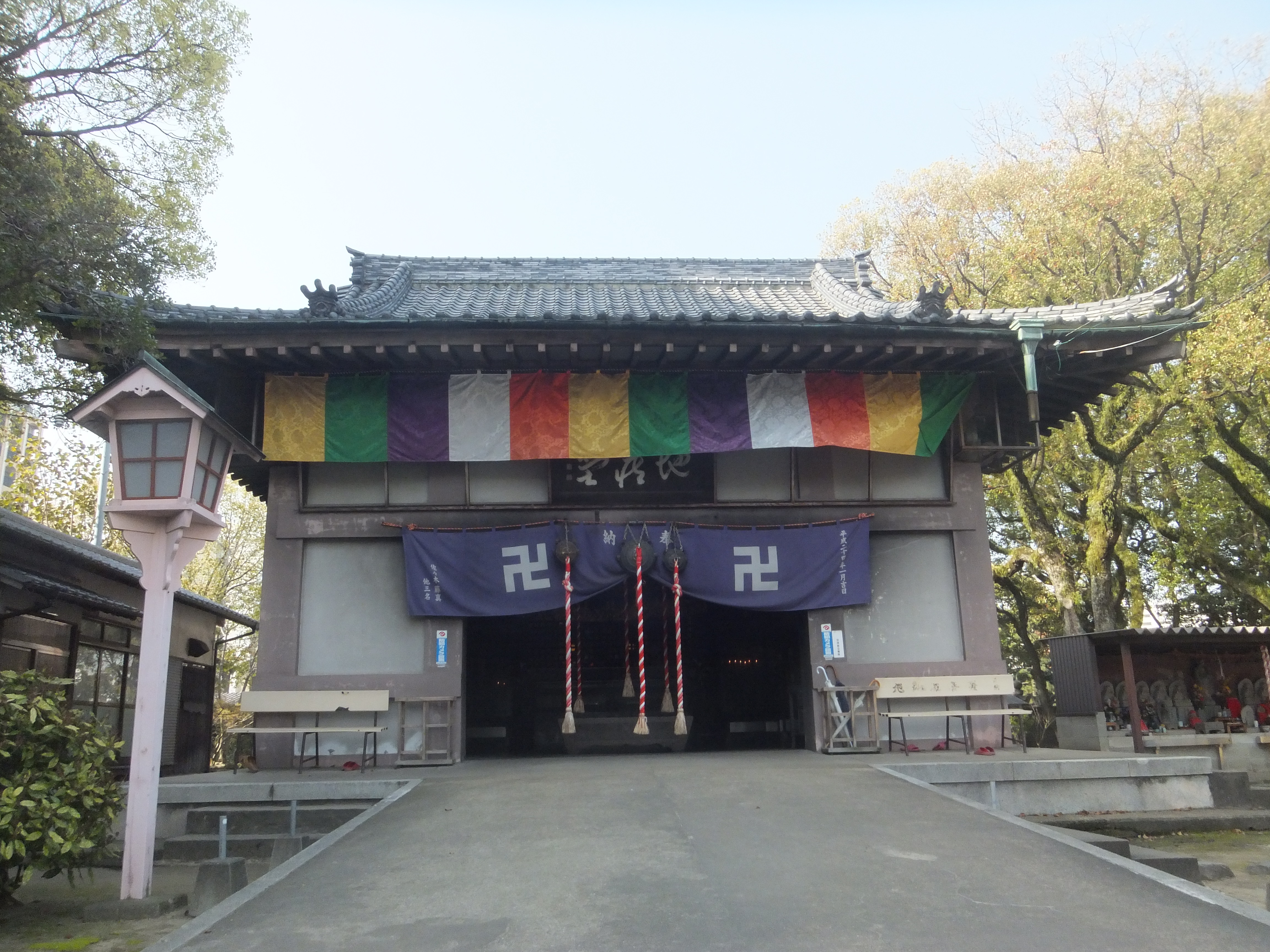
Asahi-Jizō-Hall (旭地蔵堂)

The Sōfuku-ji (崇福寺, literally temple of sublime happiness) in Fukuoka (Japan) is a Buddhist temple of the Rinzai school (Rinzai-shū). It was in 1240 at the headquarters of the Special Administrative Dazaifu by the monk Tan'e (湛慧 founded). In the following year, the monk Enni Ben'en (円爾 弁円), who had also returned from China, gave the inauguration sermon. Together with Jōten-ji Temple (承天寺 built in Hakata in 1241, it was under the control and protection of the general Mutō Sukeyori (1160-1228), who resided in Daizaifu as a representative of the Kamakura shogunate. In 1272, this temple was inhabited by Nanpo Shōmyō (also known as Daiō Kokushi), who seriously expanded it. Nampo spent thirty years there. It is believed that the monastery was built just for him.

In 1331, Shuho Myocho left Daitoku-ji for one hundred days, only to spend it in Sōfuku-ji.

During the Azuchi Momoyama period, the facility burned down in 1586 during fighting between the Shimazu clan and the Ōtomo clan. With the establishment of the Fukuoka Domain by the commander Kuroda Nagamasa (1568-1623) in 1600, this was the temple as a family temple in Hakata again build.

This temple has become a famous connection point between Japan and China. Many Chinese monks who came to Japan and many Japanese monks who went to China passed through it. Nampo himself turned out to be a master who attracted many students here, encouraged by his devotion to teaching Zen. Master Nampo described his practice in Sōfuku-ji in Sōfuku-ji gorok . It was in this temple that Nampo developed his national responsibility expressed in terms such as "Great Nation of Japan" or "Great State of Japan".

When building the castle town of Fukuoka, materials from older buildings and facilities were used. A Karamon gate comes from the Najima Castle (Japanese: 名島城, romanized: Najima-jō) located on a headland, which was demolished in 1601 because the surrounding area was insufficient for the development of a larger settlement. Many stones were used in the new Fukuoka Castle.

During the suppression of Buddhism and its separation from Shinto (Haibutsu kishaku) in the early Meiji period, the facilities fell apart. Reconstruction began in 1895. In 1918 the main gate of Fukuoka Castle was implemented and has since served as a temple portal (Sanmon, literally "mountain gate").

In 1945 the city of Fukuoka was again heavily damaged by the US Air Force. Among other things, the famous tea room of the merchant and tea master Kamiya Sōdan (1551-1635) went up in flames.

After the war, the remaining burial grounds of the Kuroda rulers were restored and concentrated on a fifth of the former area.

In 2005, three buildings were lost to fire.

In 2014, the Kuroda family handed over the remaining Kuroda graves from the Edo period to the city of Fukuoka. In the same year, the short stairway (sandō) from the street to the temple portal was expanded. The devotional items shops were also reduced and implemented.

On the inside of the outer wall in the publicly accessible front temple area there is a long, covered walkway with hundreds of large and small statues from many different Buddhist denominations that were deposited there by believers.

== Significant tombs ==
In addition to the members of the Kuroda dynasty, other personalities of regional and national importance found their final resting place in the cemetery of the Sōfuku Temple, such as the trader and tea master Shimai Sōshitsu (1539–1650) and the male-educated ophthalmologist Takaba Osamu (1831–1891), who exerted a great influence on numerous personalities of the Meiji period through their "ginseng field school", also the first president of the Fukuoka Medical School Ōmori Harutoyo (1852-1912) and members of the nationalist organization Gen'yōsha such as Tōyama Mitsuru and Kurushima Tsuneki.

== Important objects ==
- Sanmon - was originally the main gate of the former Fukuoka Castle. This building is single-story; the roof is covered with tiles, and on the left side there is a side door that is a remnant of the gate's former function. It is considered an important cultural property of the prefecture.
- Karamon - it is believed to be part of the former Najim castle. During the Edo period it was renewed. It is considered an important cultural property of the prefecture.
- Tomb of Shimai Soshitsu, a famous trader of the Edo period.
- Numerous important items belonging to monks, including Sengai Gibon.
- Old Korean Korai bell.
- Votive plaque donated to the monastery by Emperor Go-Toba (Japanese 後 鳥羽, lord 1183-1198).

== Literature ==
- Andrew Cobbing: Hakata – The Cultural Worlds of Northern Kyushu. Brill, Leiden 2013.
- Heinrich Dumoulin : History of Zen Buddhism . Volume 2: Japan. Francke, Bern and Munich 1986 (reprint 2nd edition, Francke, Bern and Munich 2014, ISBN 978-3-7720-8516-1)

== Gallery ==
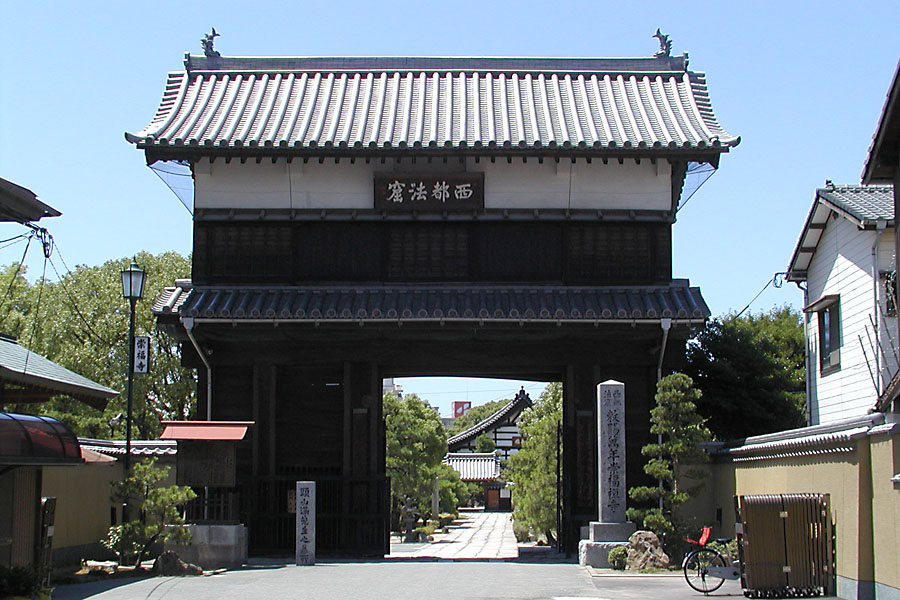
Sanmon

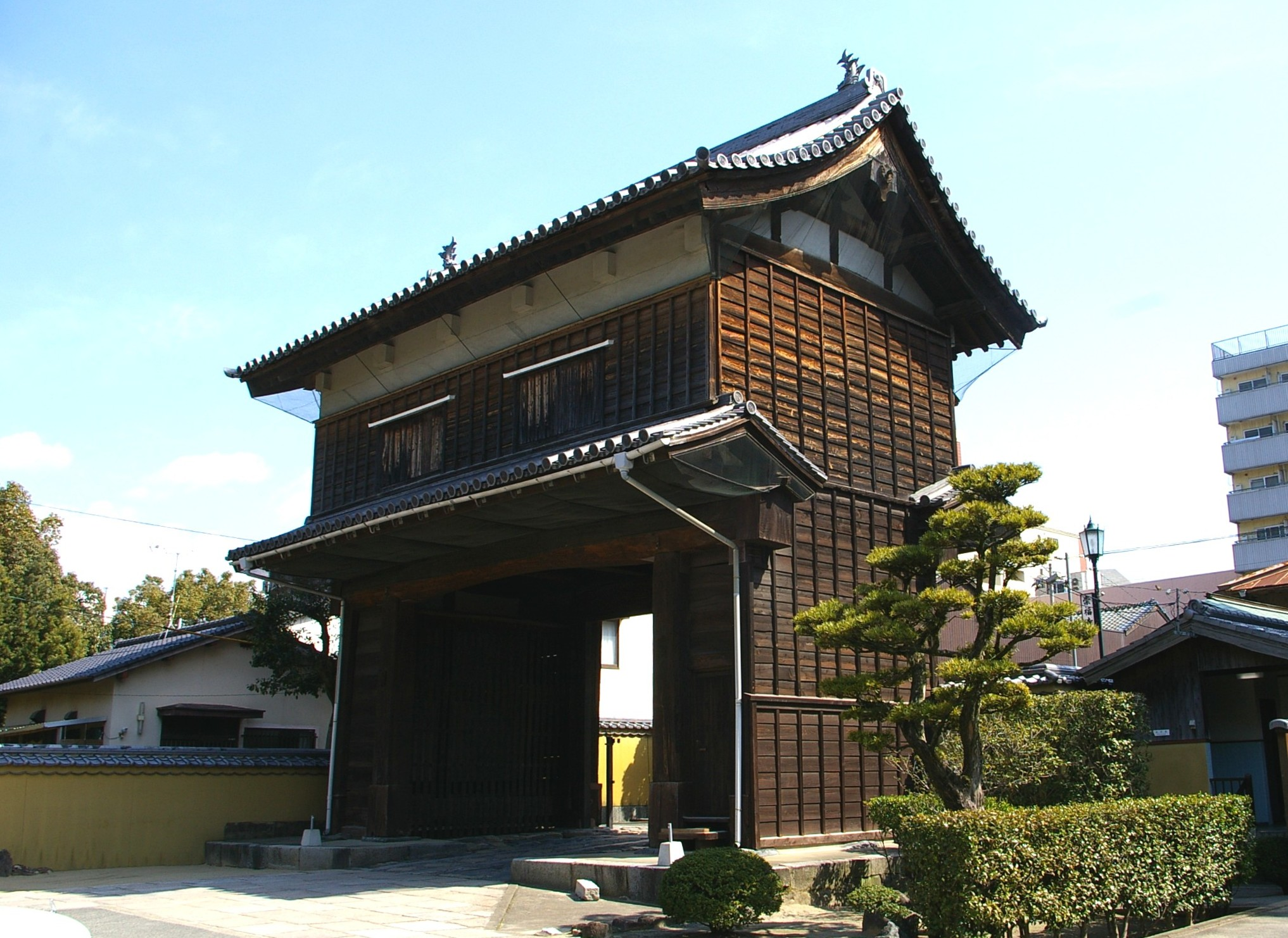
Sanmon

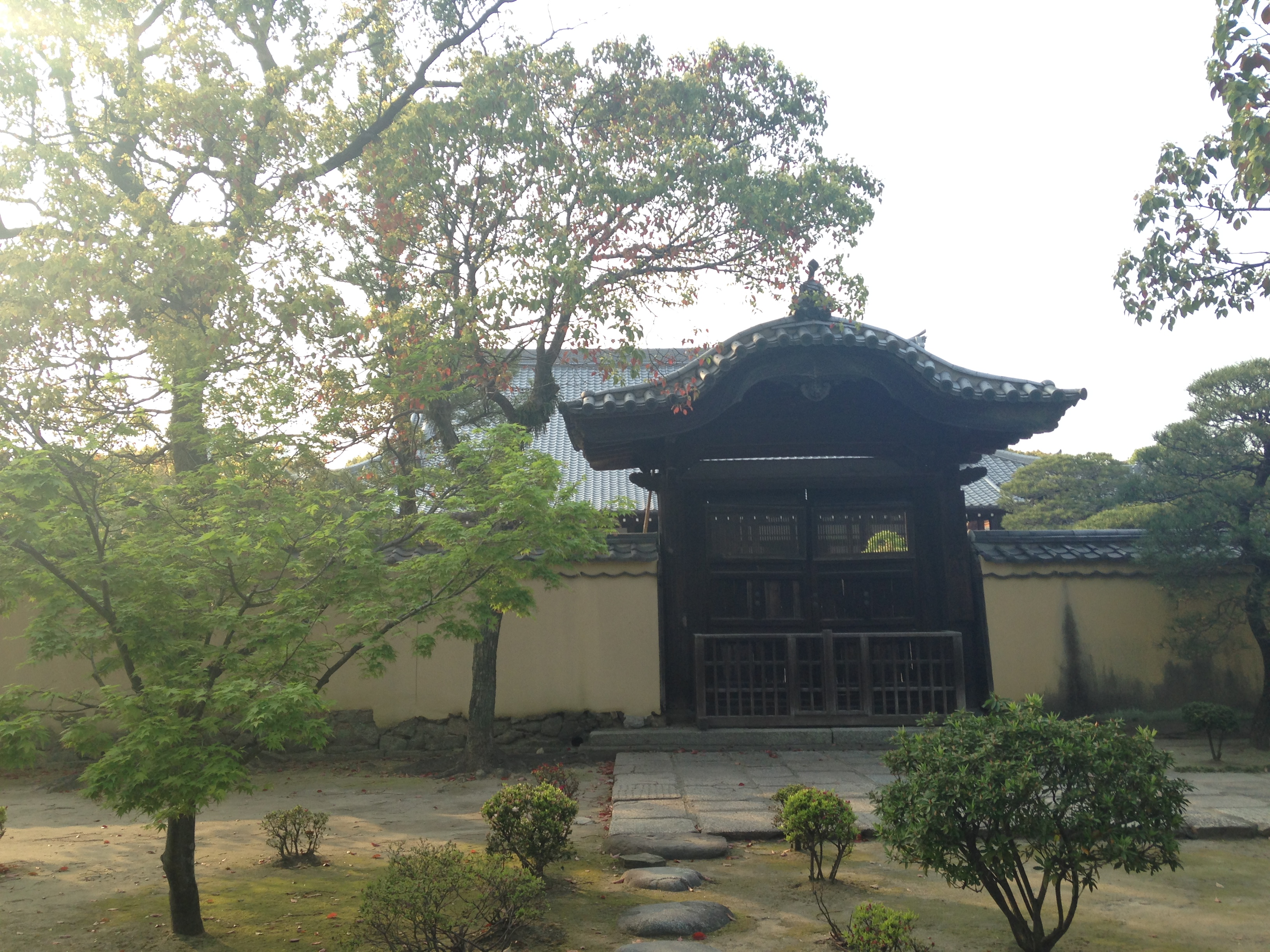
Karamon

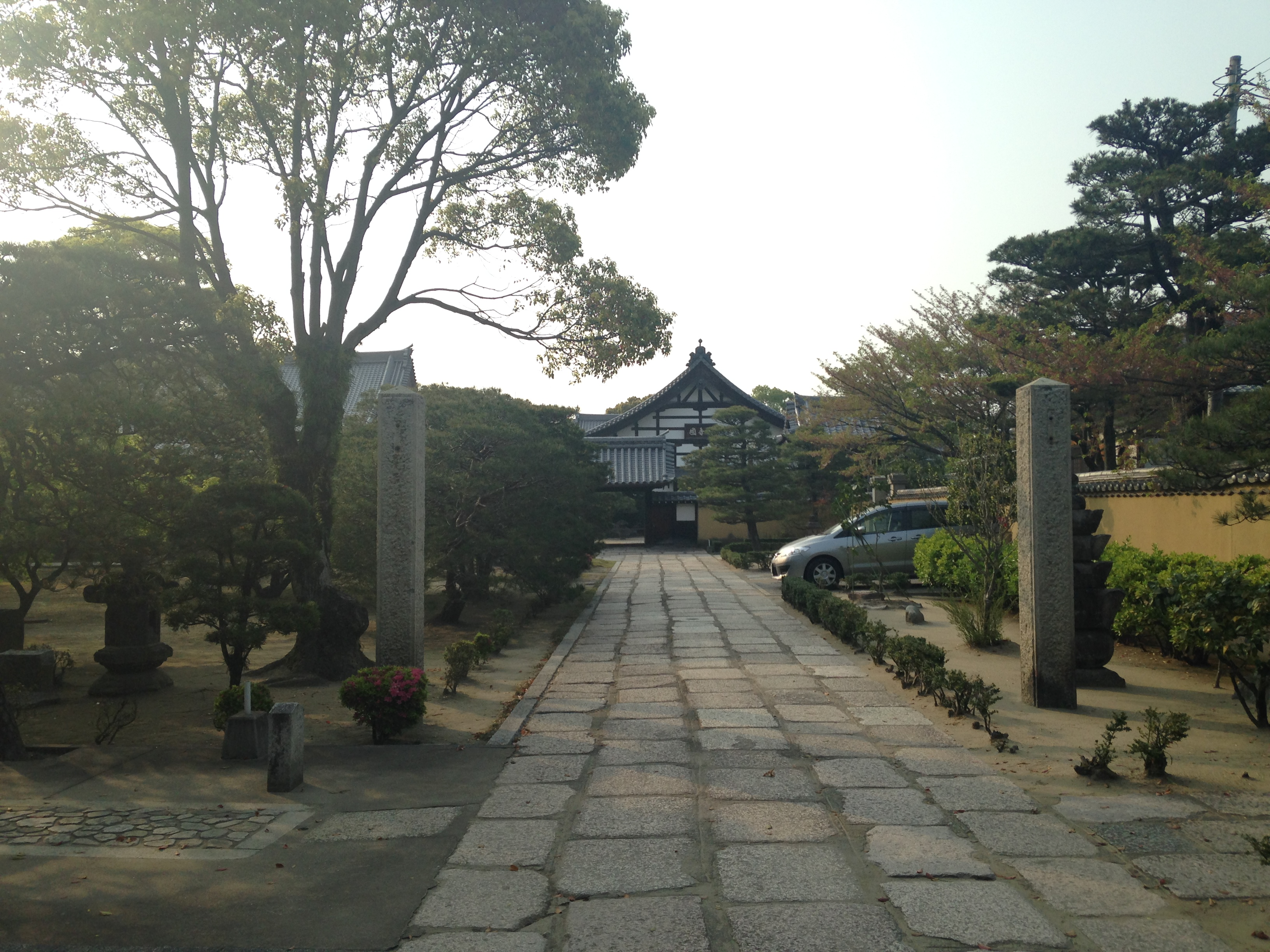
The road to Kuri in the monastery

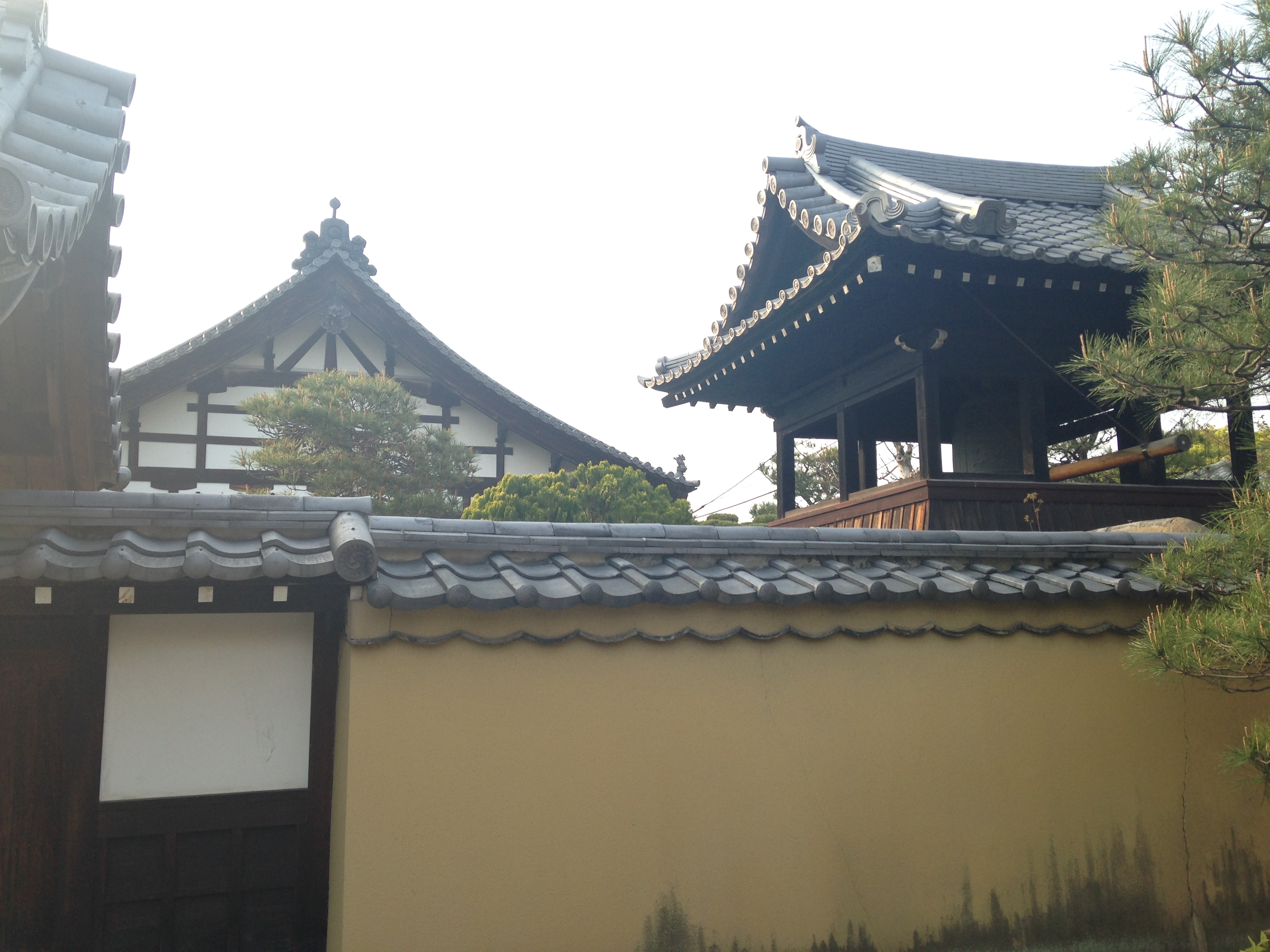
Kuri and the bell tower

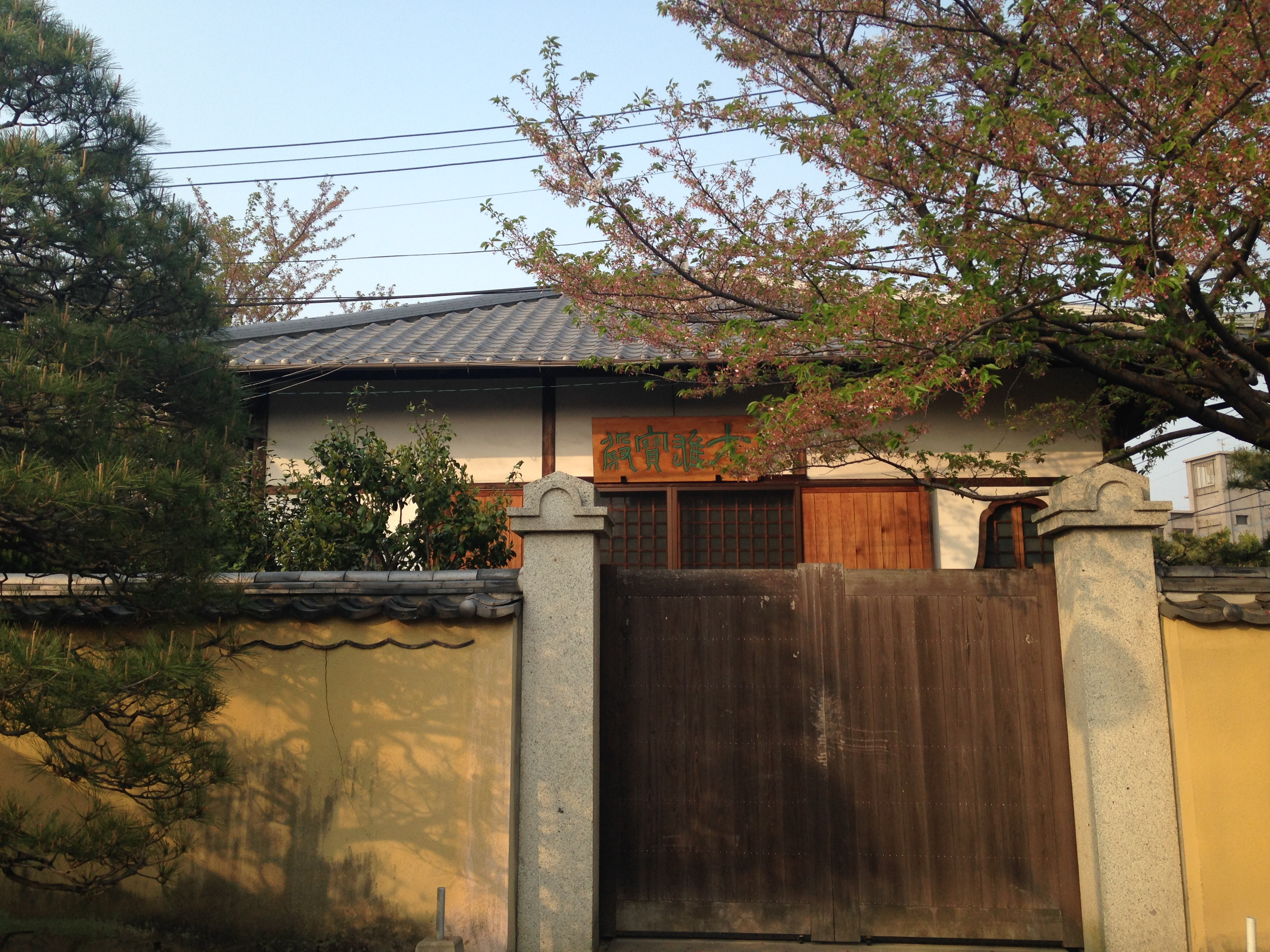
The building of Mahavira (Great Conqueror, i.e. Buddha)

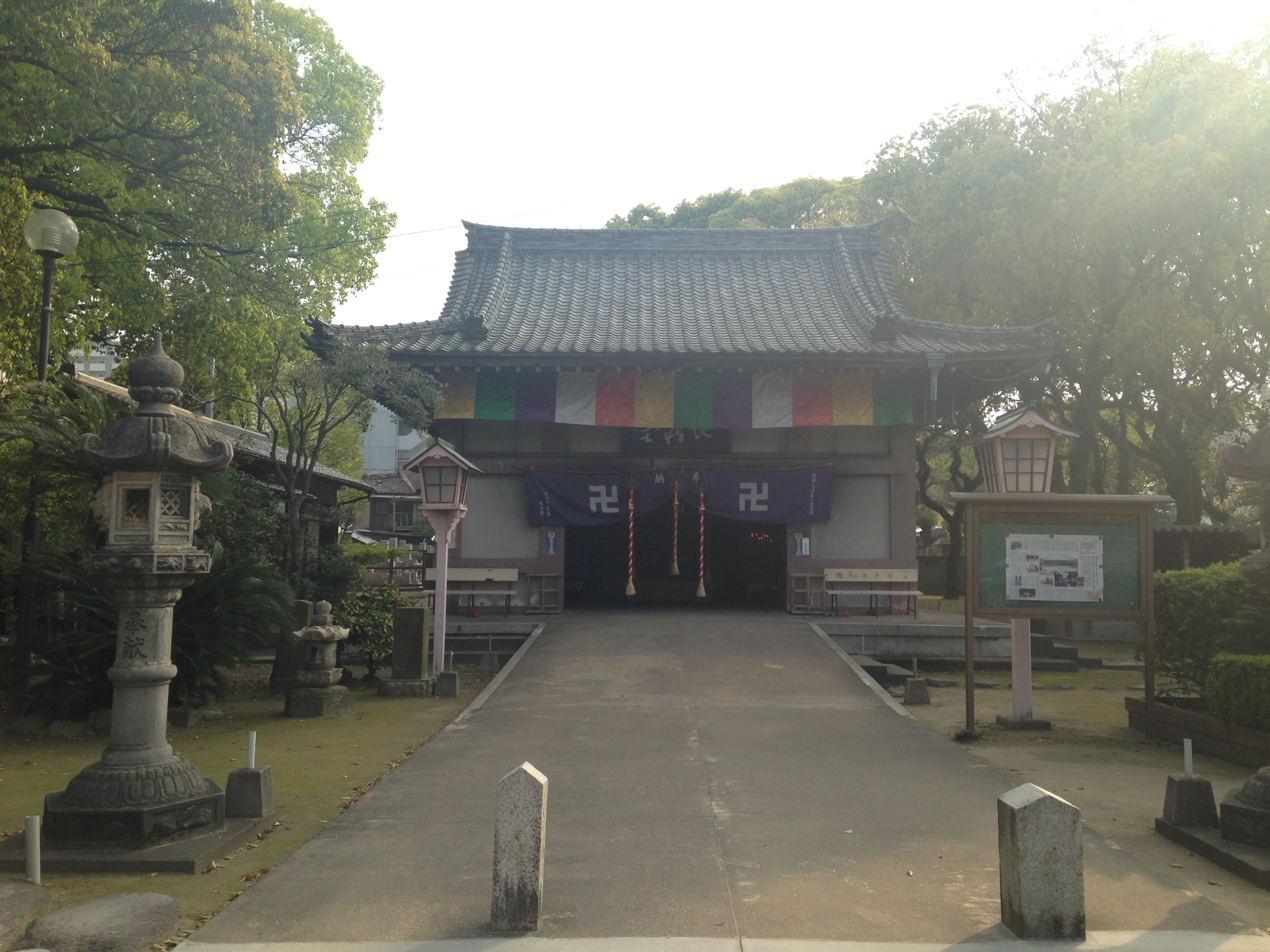
Jizō Pavilion (Ksitigarbha)

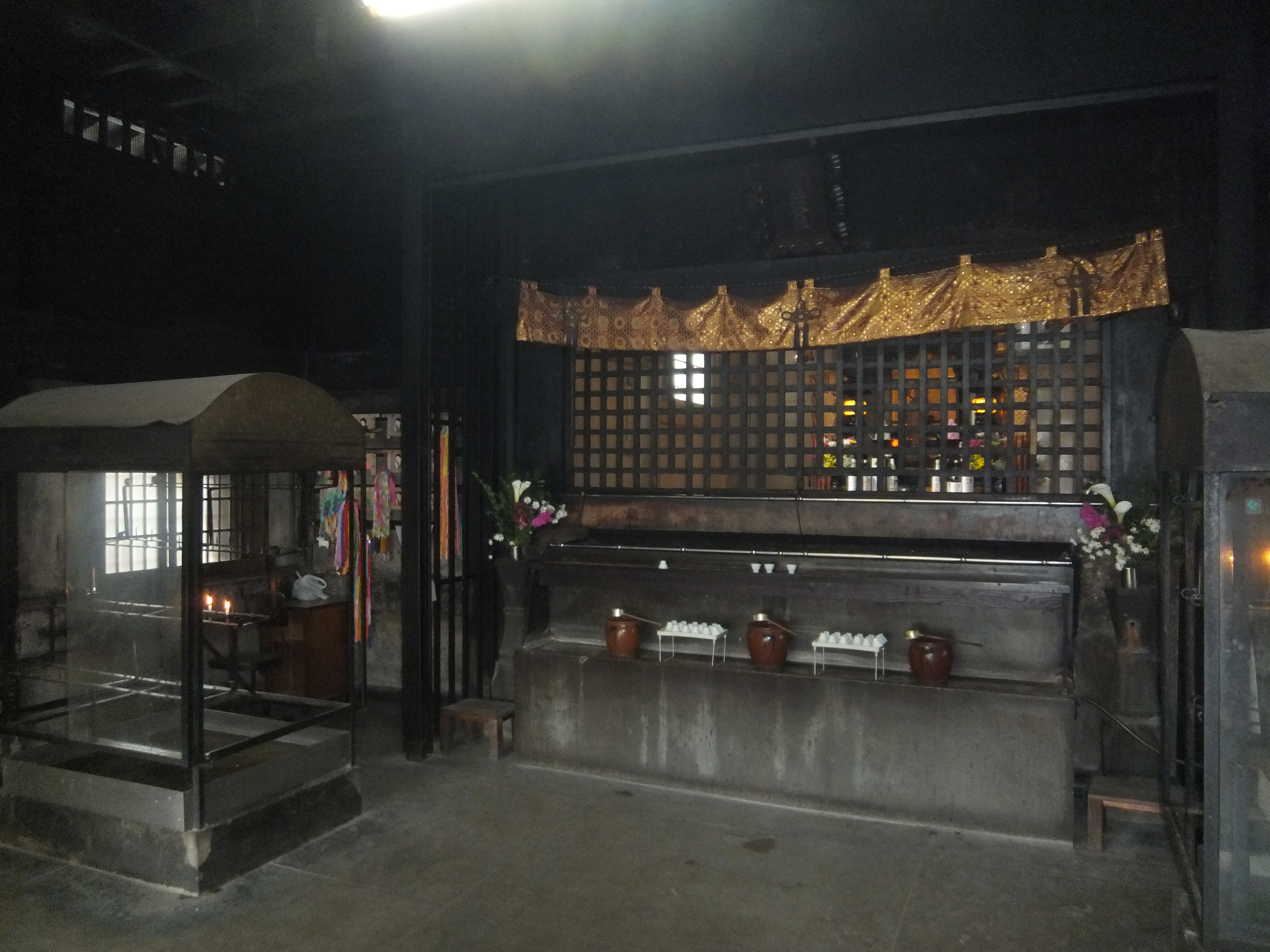
Interior of the Asahi-Jizō-Hall

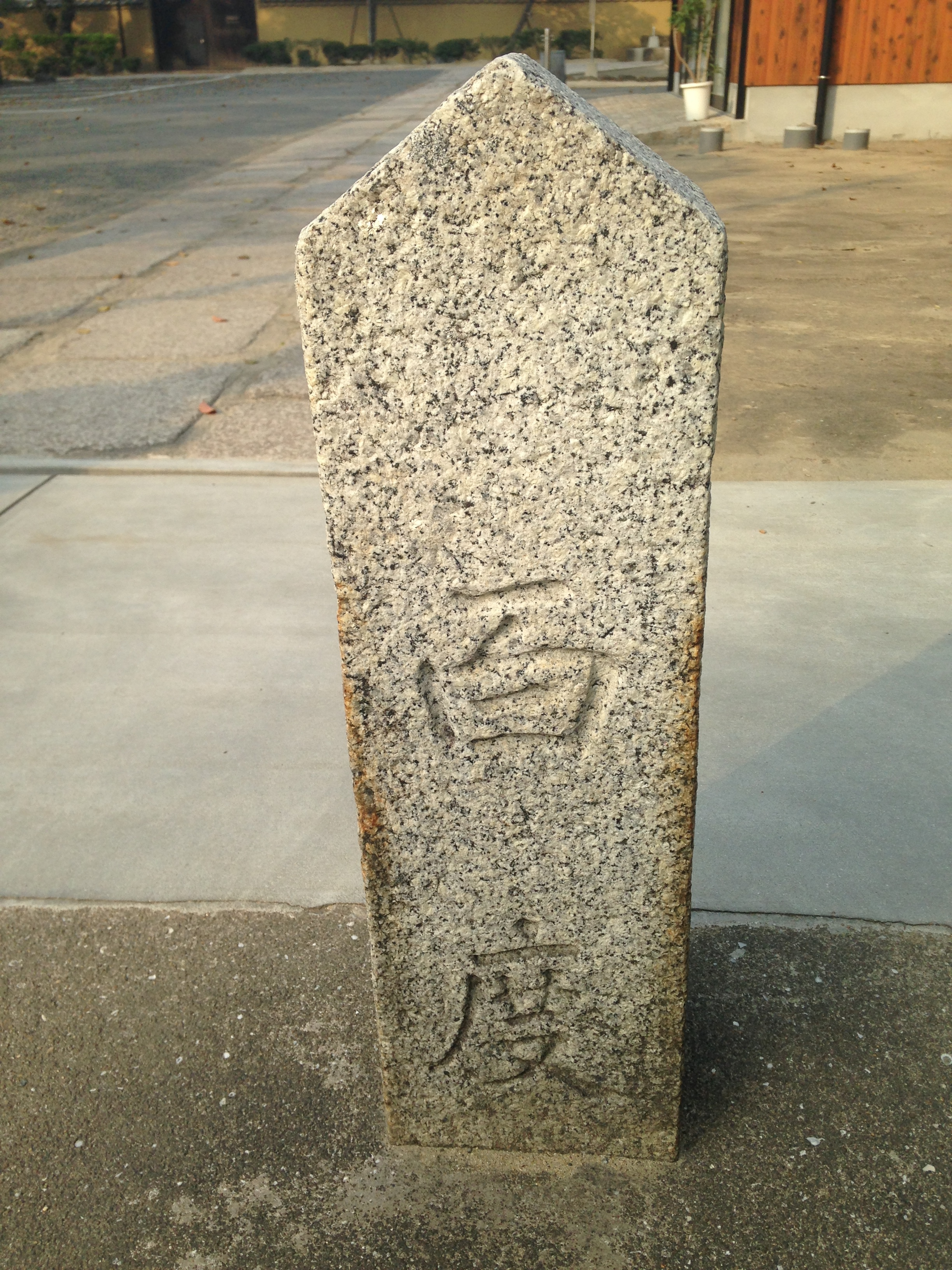
Hyakudo-ishi - "stone of a hundred prayers" in front of the Ksitigarbha pavilion

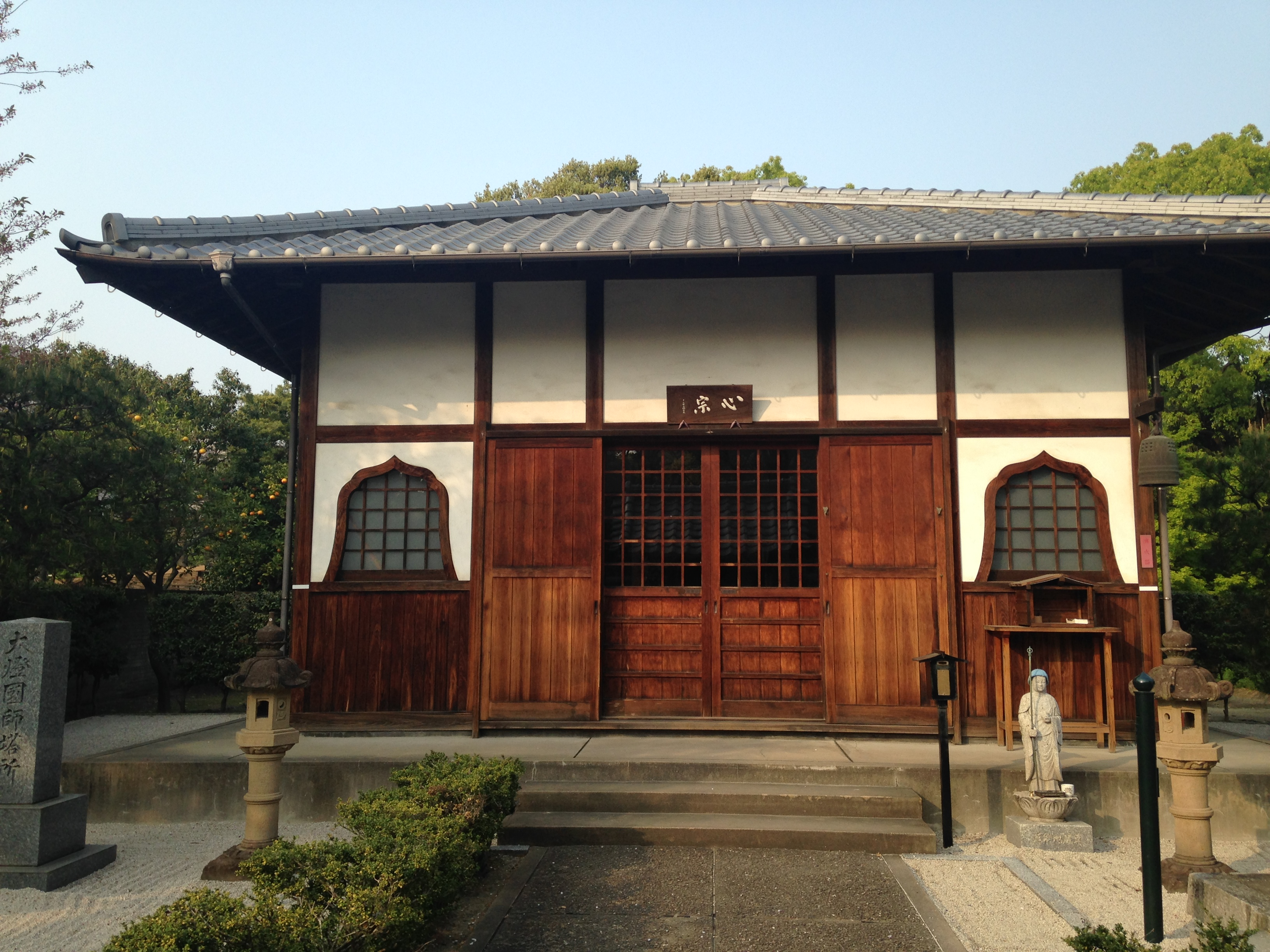
Shinsō-an temple

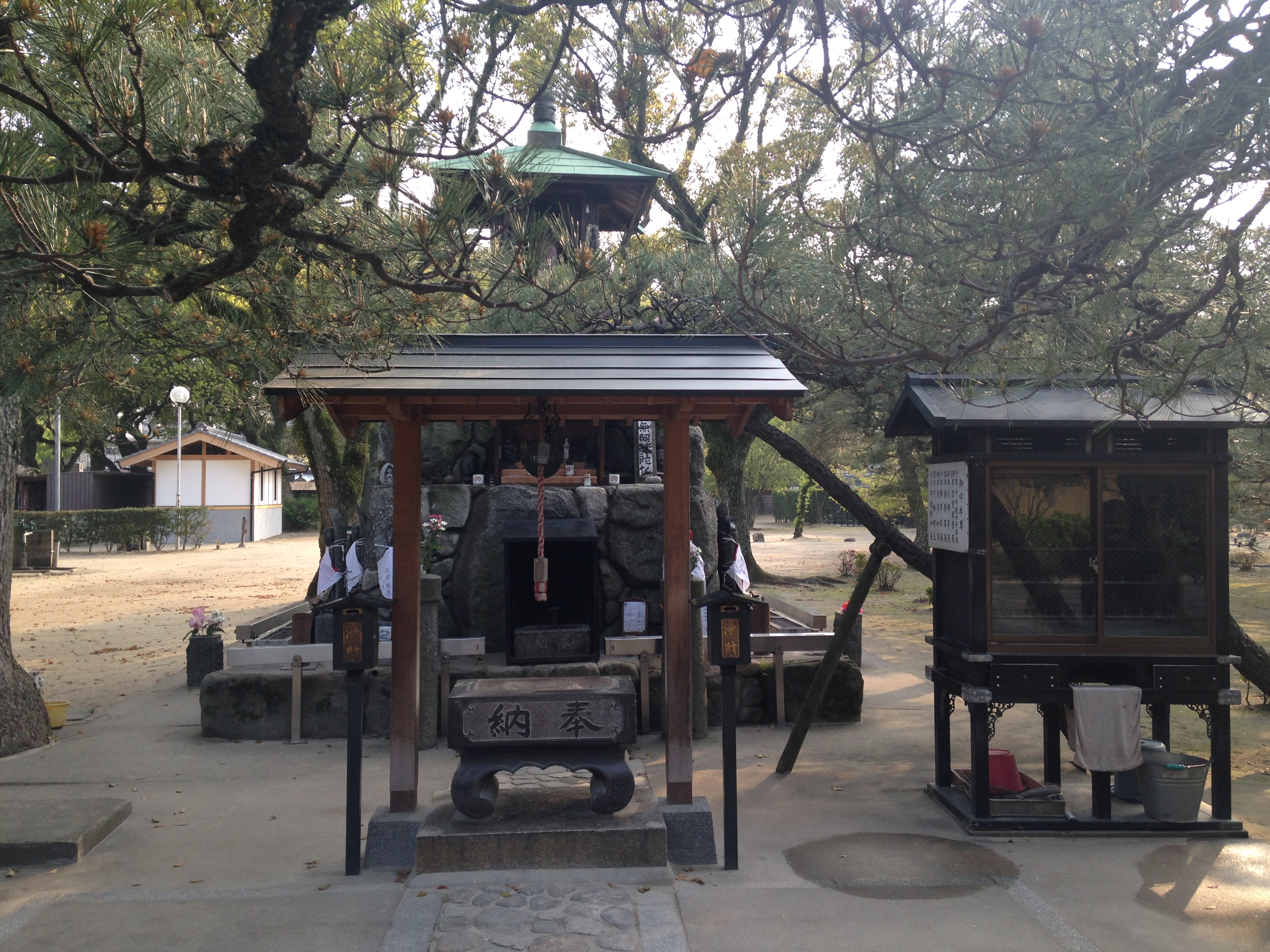
Statue of Ksitigarbha (Japanese Jizō)

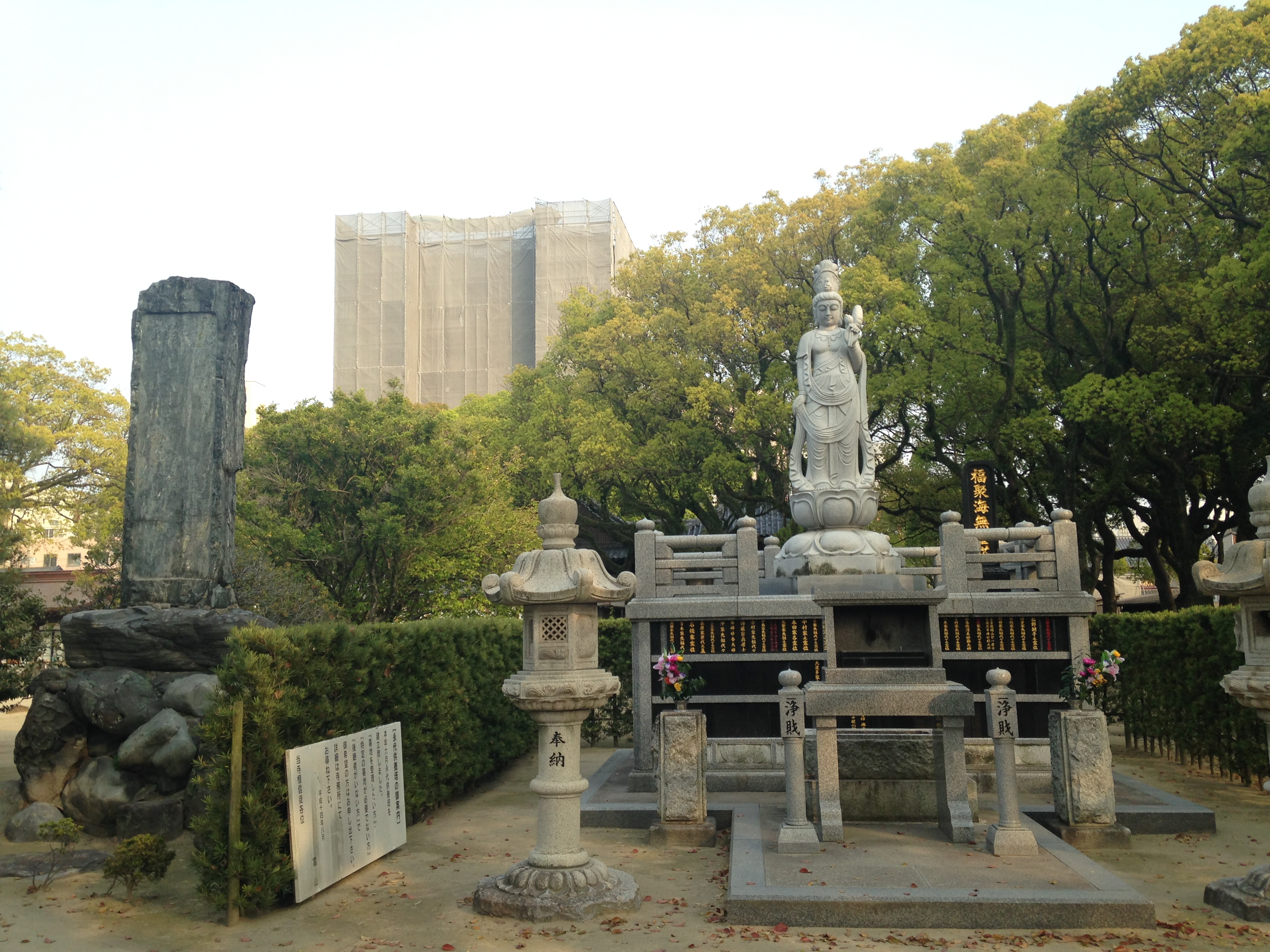
Fukujukaimuryoto tower

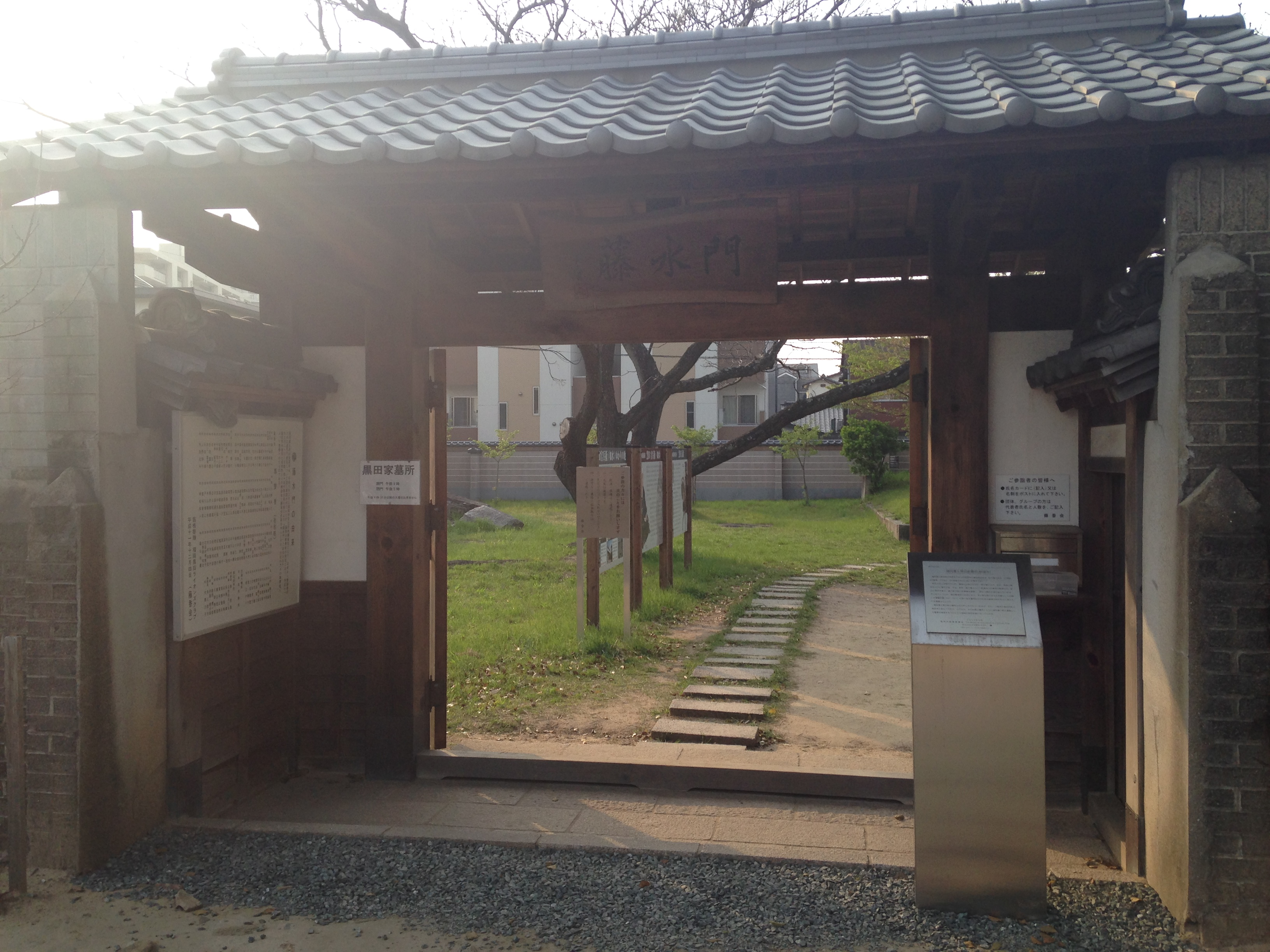
Gate of the Kuroda family cemetery

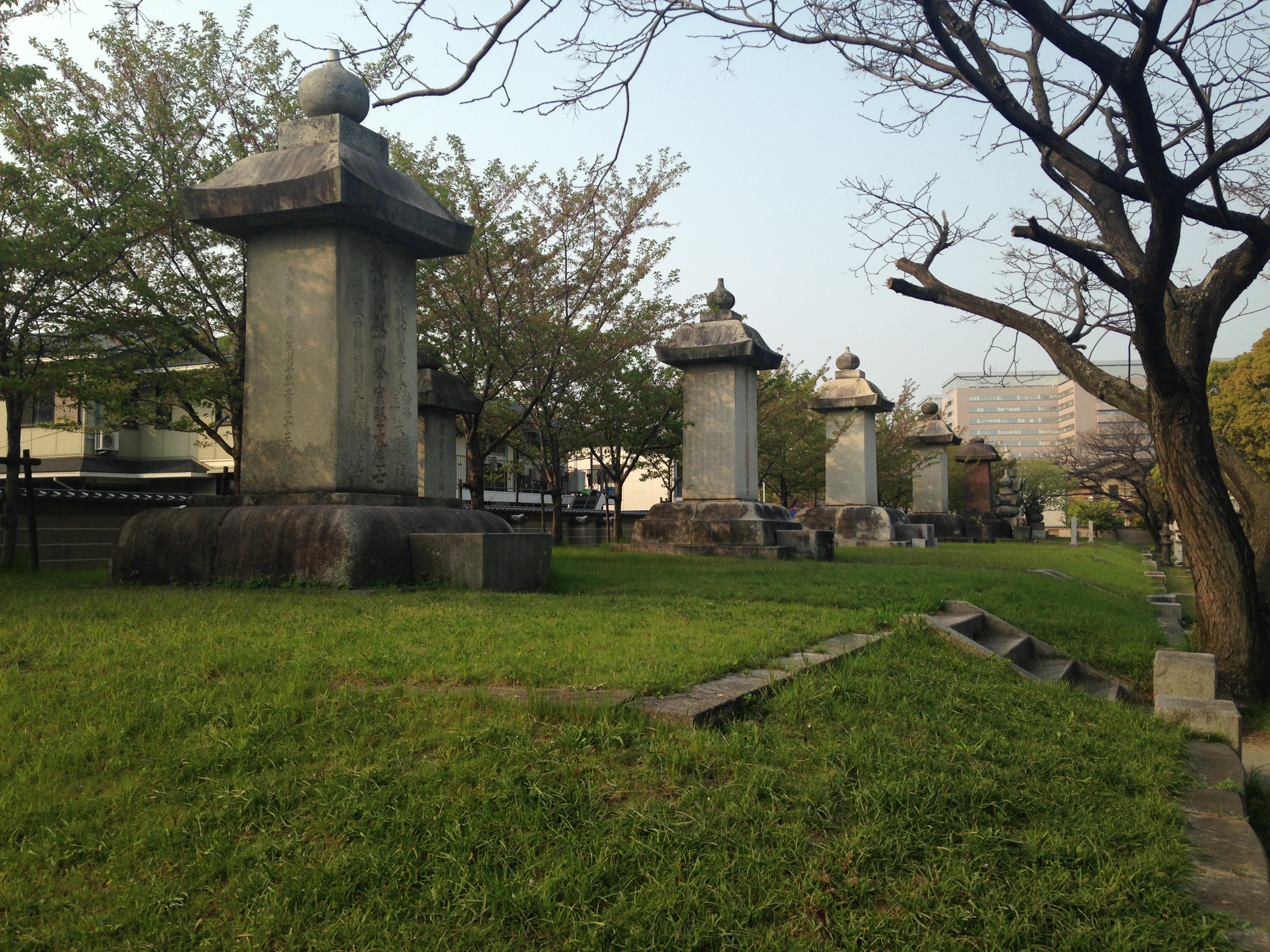
The Kuroda family cemetery

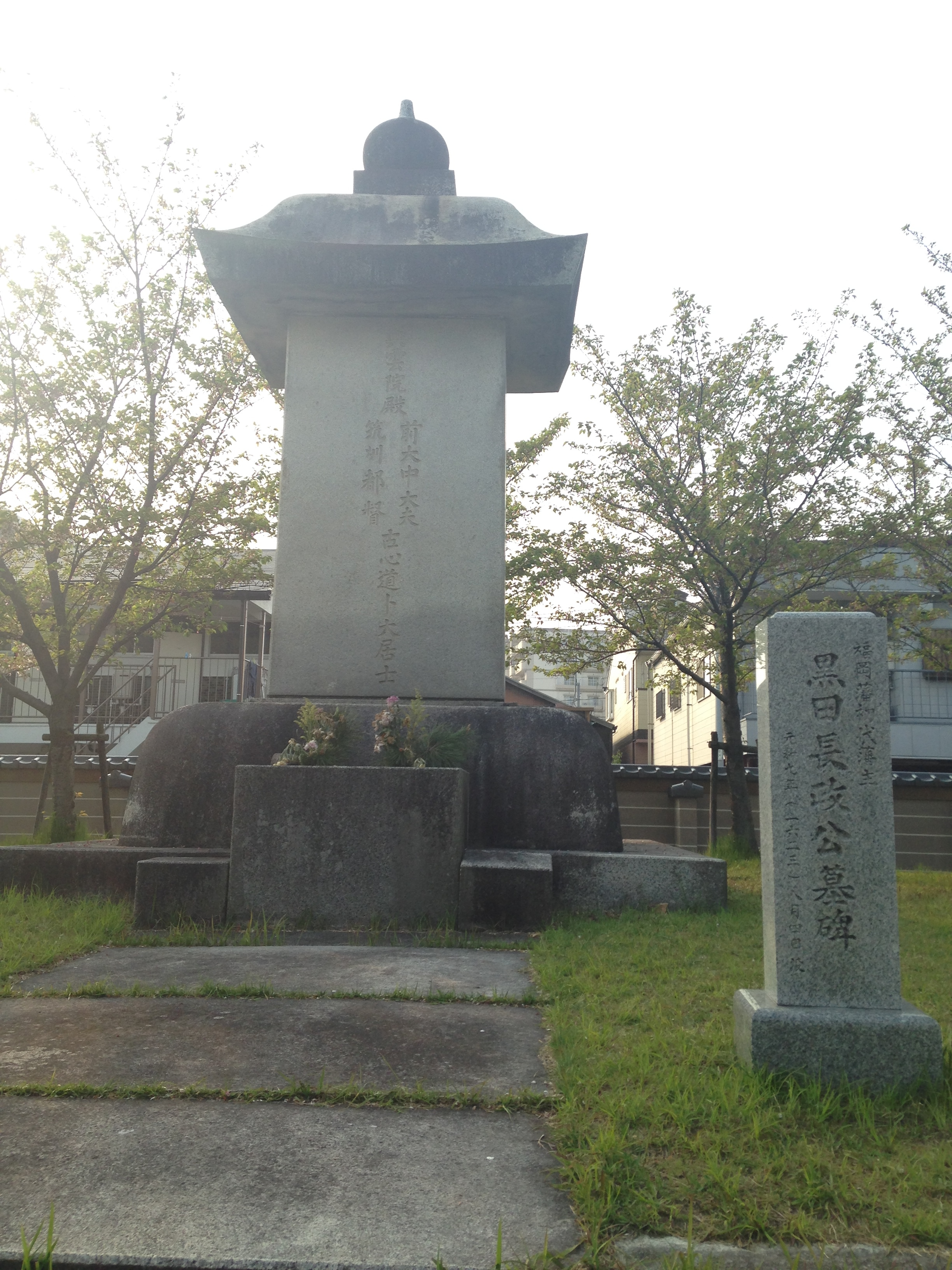
Stela Kuroda Nagamasa

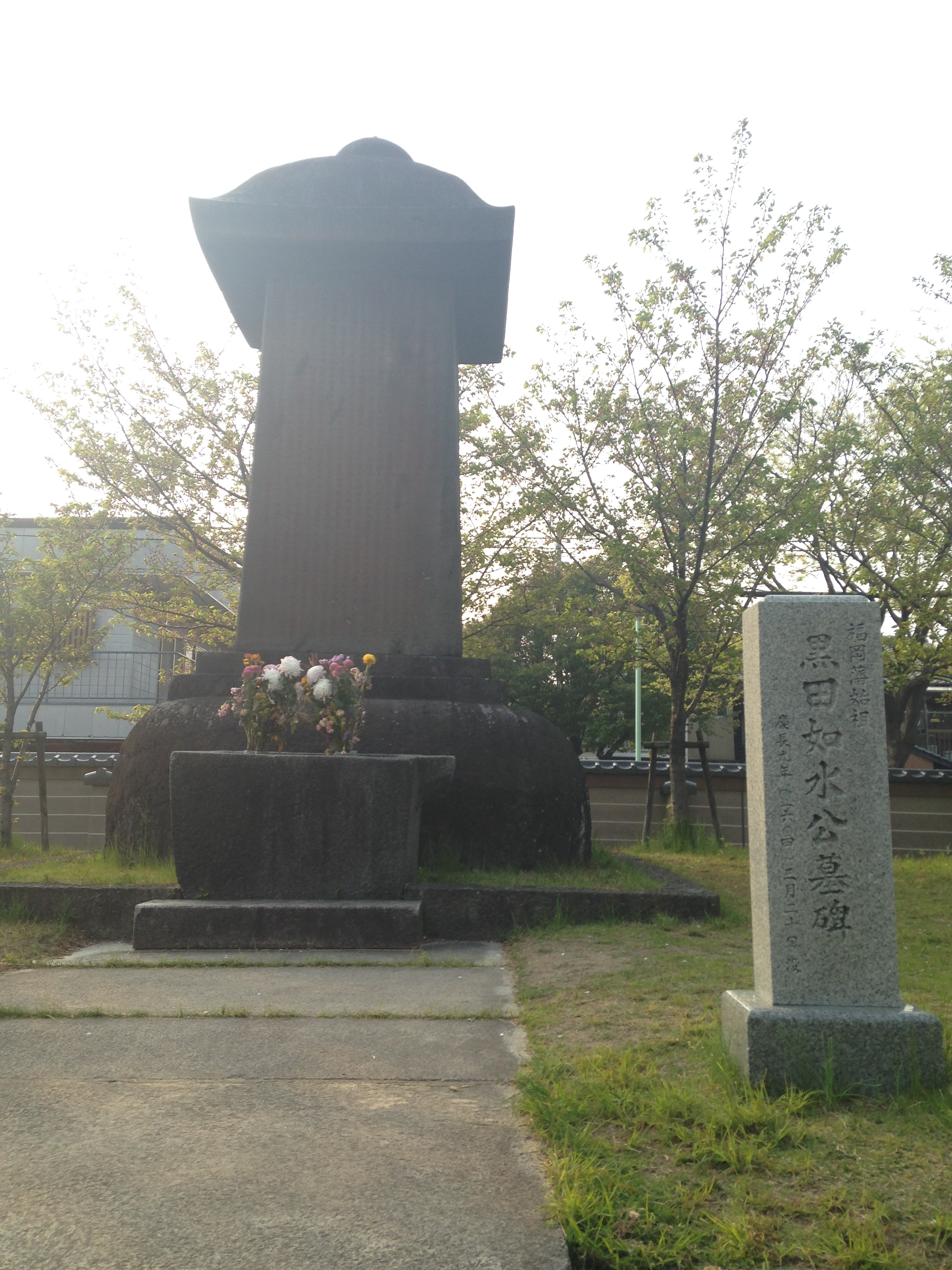
Stela Kuroda Yoshitaka

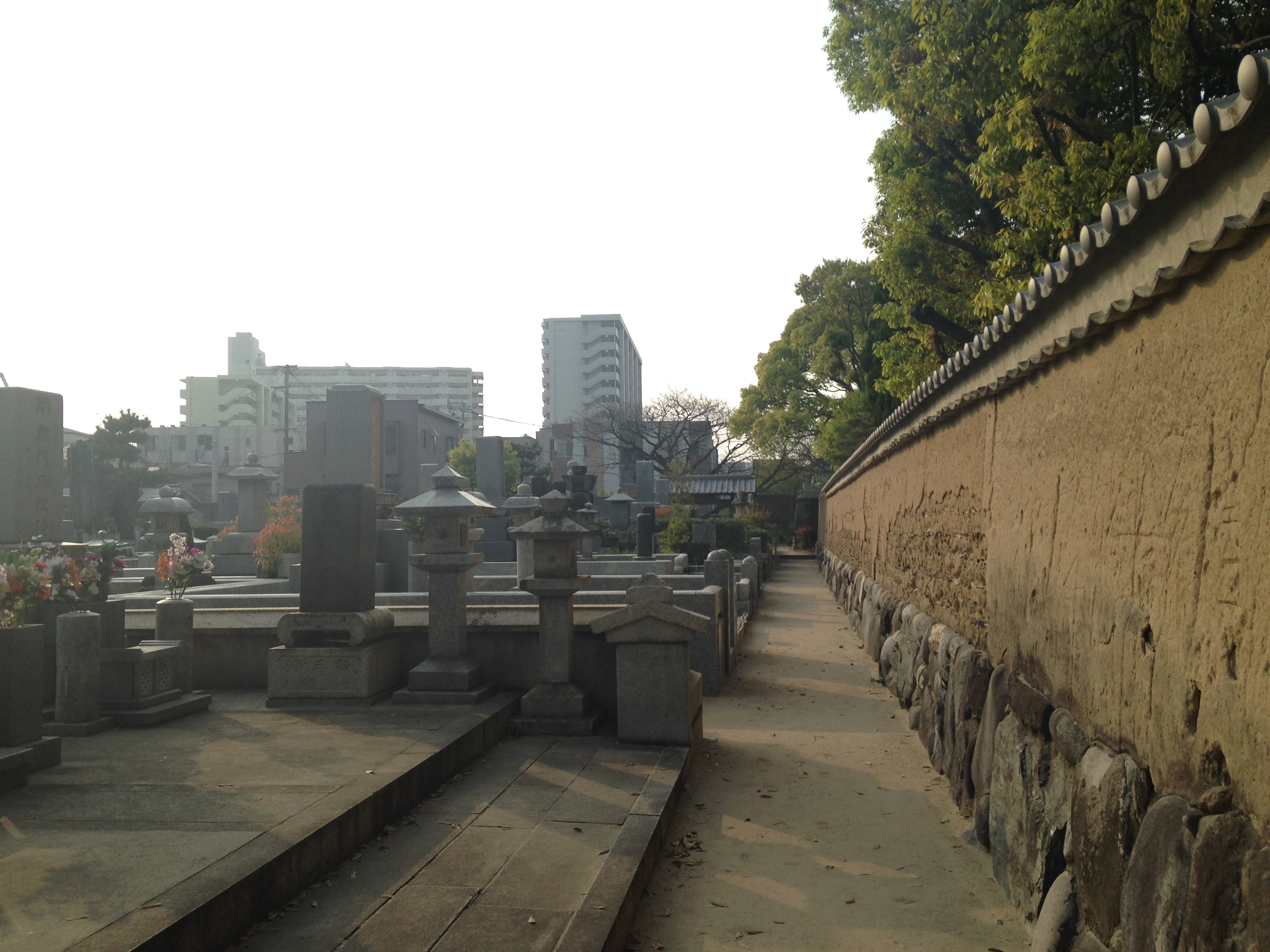
Wall and cemetery

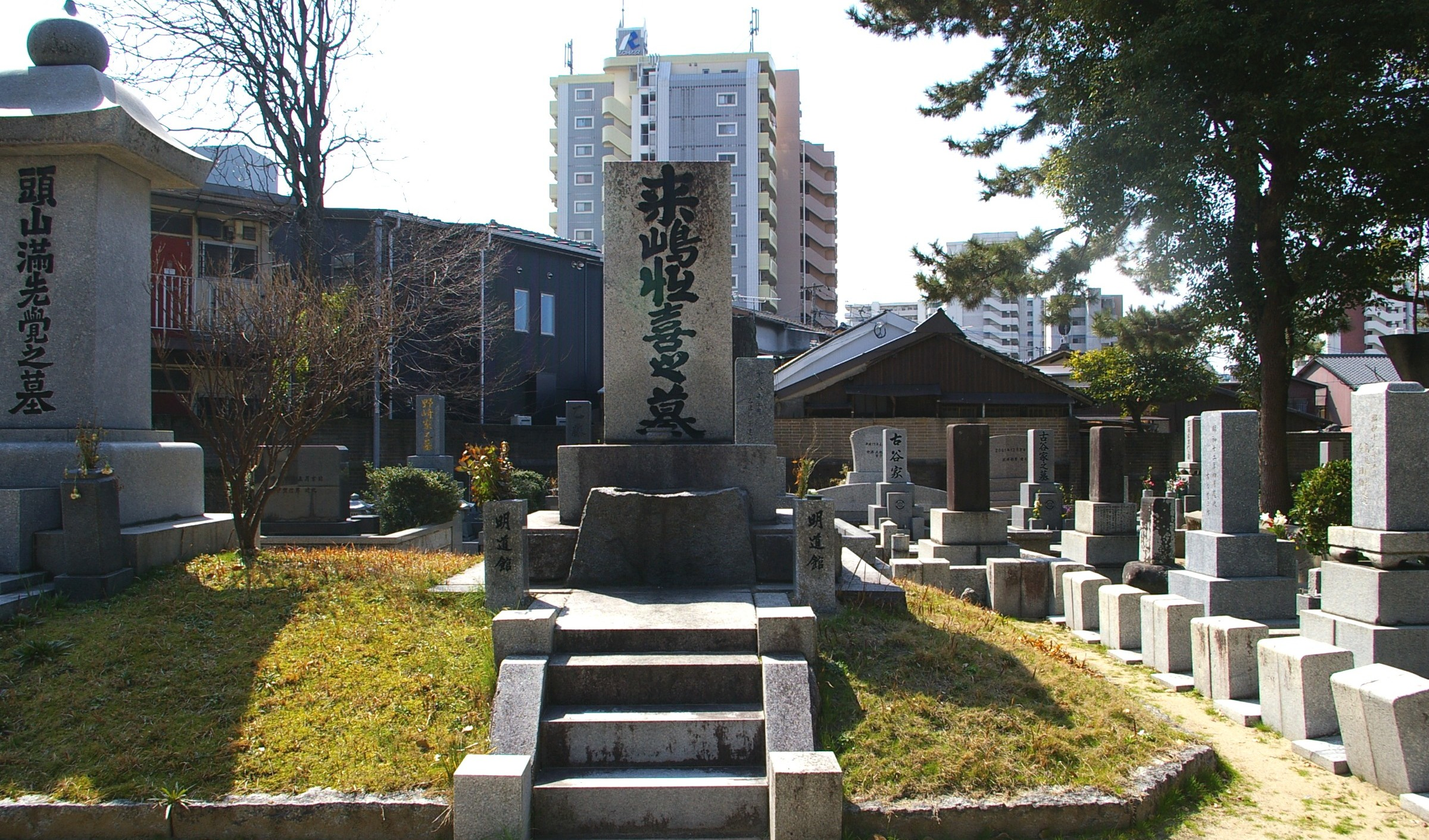
Cemetery

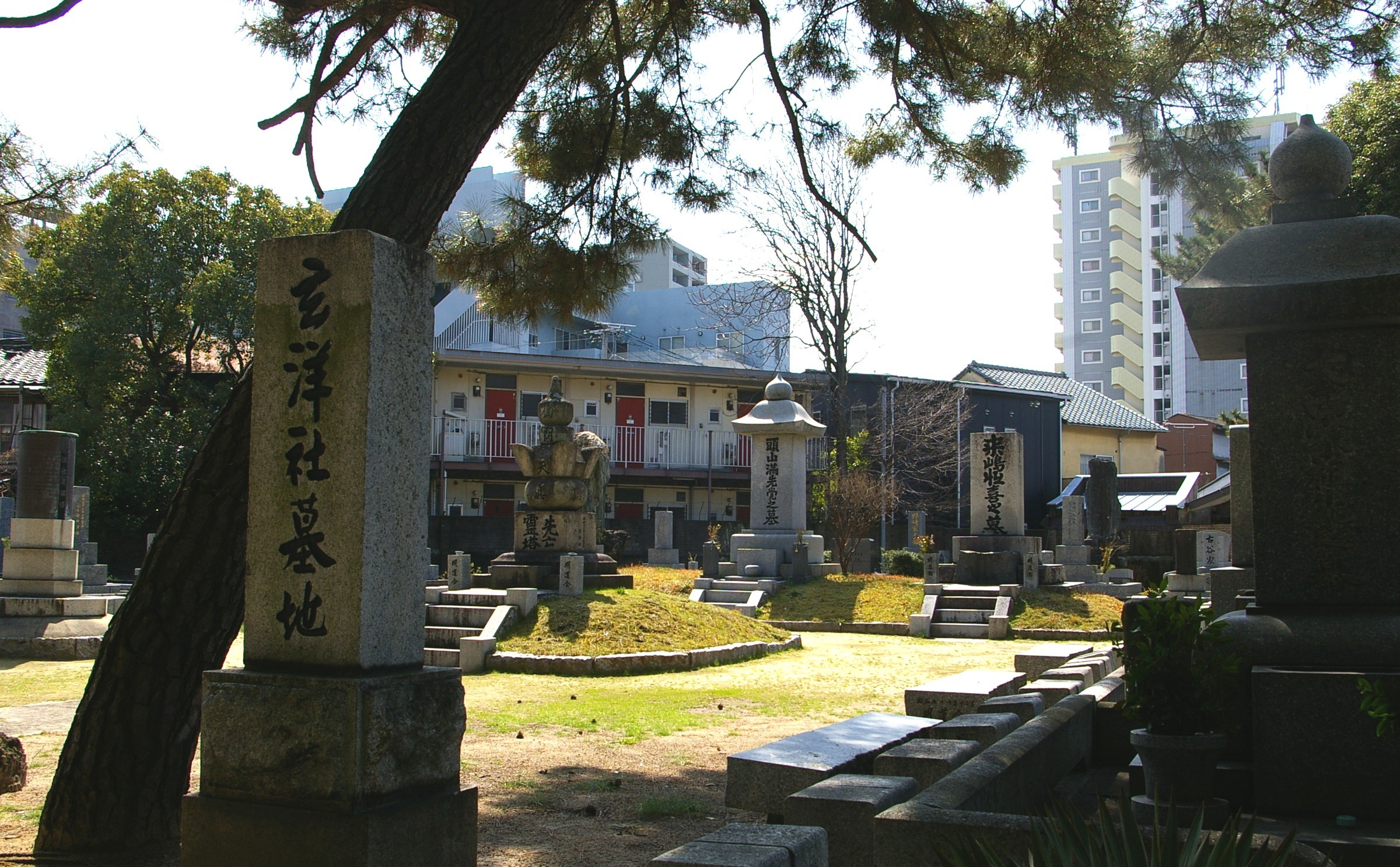
Cemetery

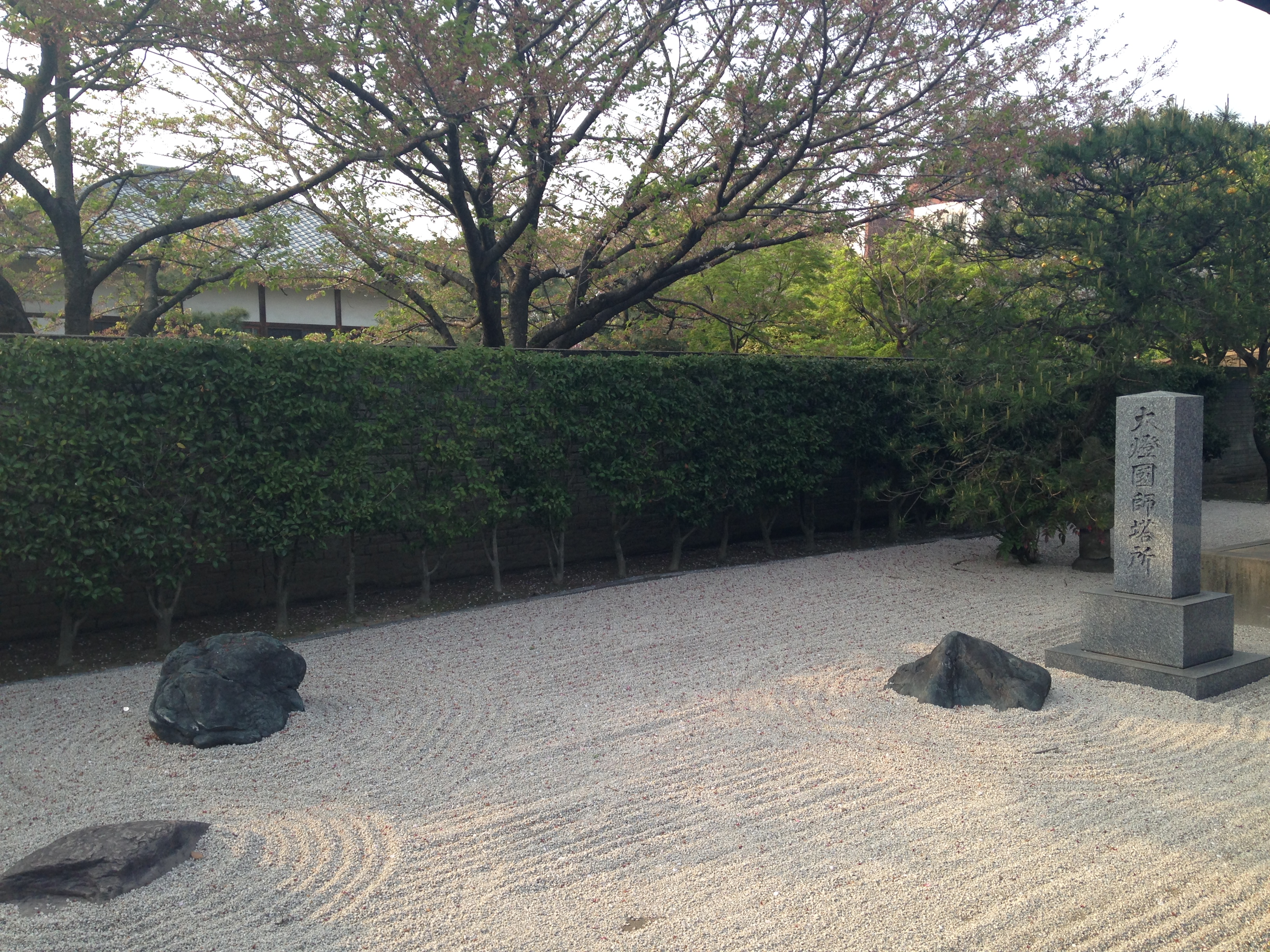
Zen garden
