= Syoh Yoshida =

Japanese artist

- Born: Syoh Yoshida; January 24, 1984 (age 42); Aichi, Japan
- Known for: Painter
- Movement: Nihonga, ink wash painting

Syoh Yoshida (吉田 翔, Yoshida Shō; born 24 January 1984 in Aichi, Japan) is a Japanese artist of the nihonga and ink painting genre.

He currently lives and works in Kyoto. He graduated from the Faculty of Arts and Design at Osaka Seikei University, where he learned and matured his craft in both Japanese painting. Since his first solo exhibition "Beautiful Thing" in Kyoto in 2006, he has been expressing his love and devotion for nature and townships primarily through his unique and striking black and white paintings. He has also participated in several high profile and successful solo and group exhibitions throughout Japan in recent years.

== Artwork ==
By studying on his own, Syoh Yoshida pursued the expression of ink painting. Starting at the age of 20, he focused his efforts on flower paintings, using sumi-ink and gofun-chalk on eginu-silk. In cooperation with those who were qualified in the Kyoto Hyogu traditional craftsmenship, he tailored his works on the hanging scrolls and folding screens that had been arranged in a modern way, based on the concept of "Hyogu suited to modern architecture", while maintaining the classical Japanese mounting style.

Being in prominent collections, his works have attracted the attention of numerous collectors, both at home and abroad. As a result, he has been engaged in a wide range of activities as a creator, participating solo exhibitions and group exhibitions both at home and abroad, with Kyoto as his base, as well as participating in all kinds of design projects that took advantage of his inherent design sensibilities.

In recent years, in collaboration with traditional artisans, such as those specializing in kimono, Kyoto lacquerware and Kyoto fans, whose art has been revered for many centuries, he created yukata (a casual summer kimono), lacquerware and fans that featured his original design. Having also attracted attention by the works which he had achieved in cooperation with the Grand Master Potter of tea ceremony utensils and the Grand Master of flower arrangement whose art had continued for centuries in Kyoto, he has been active as a ink painter and a man of culture who represented Kyoto.

== Educations ==
- 2008 Postgraduate Degree in Japanese Painting, Faculty of Art & Design, Osaka Seikei University
- 2006 Bachelor of Fine Arts Degree in Japanese Painting of Faculty of Art & Design, Osaka Seikei University
- 2004 Associate of Arts Degree in Japanese Painting of Seian Junior College of Art & Design
- 2001 Completion of Japanese Painting Course, Kawaijuku Educational Institution of Arts

== Solo exhibitions ==
- 2015
  - Water Ink, Nagoya Matsuzakaya, Aichi, Japan
- 2011
  - White Lake, JR Osaka Mitsukoshi Isetan, Osaka, Japan
- 2009
  - Insphere, imura art gallery, Kyoto, Japan
- 2008
  - Distant Promise, Harbour City, Hong Kong
  - Night Trace, Shinjuku Takashimaya, Tokyo, Japan
- 2007
  - Day full of rain, CASPER'S Gallery, Tokyo, Japan
  - Day full of rain, imura art gallery, Kyoto, Japan
- 2006
  - Beautiful Thing spaceB, Kyoto, Japan

== Group exhibitions ==
- 2016
  - UZUMASA EDO SAKABA, Toei Kyoto Studio Park, Kyoto, Japan
  - Minotti Living Attendant 2016, Minotti Japnan, Tokyo, Japan
  - New Wave of Japanese Painter, Shizuoka Matsuzakaya, Shizuoka, Japan
  - Contemporary Japanese Ink 2016, The National Art Center, Tokyo, Japan
  - Contemporary Japanese Ink, Rai Sanyo Commemorative Cultural Foundation, Hiroshima
  - Contemporary Japanese Ink, Nagai Garou, Tokyo, Japan
- 2015
  - New Wave of Japanese Painter, Shizuoka Matsuzakaya, Shizuoka, Japan
  - Modern Kyoto Ceramic 2015 - Rimpa, The Oldest Zen Temple Kenninji, Kyoto, Japan
  - Charity Dinner for BirdLife International in Kyoto - Presented by Amon Miyamoto -, Azekura, Kyoto, Japan
  - Contemporary Japanese Ink 2015, The National Art Center, Tokyo, Japan
  - Chikusen - Yukata Exhibition (Takashimaya Nippon Monogatari Project), Takashimaya,(traveled throughout each Takashimaya department store), Japan
  - +81 GALLERY Anniversary Exhibition, +81 GALLERY, New York, US
  - Towards a Celebration of 400 Years of Rimpa School of Japanese Painting, The Museum of Kyoto, Kyoto, Japan
- 2014
  - Contemporary Japanese Ink 2014, The National Art Center, Tokyo, Japan
  - GRAPHIC PASSPORT 2014 IN NEW YORK, NYU, IRIS & B.GERALD CANTOR, FILM CENTER NYU, +81 GALLERY and more, New York, US
- 2013
  - AICHI TRIENNALE Partner Ship Exhibition | MATSUZAKAYA ART SELECTION | YAMATO DYNAMICS, Nagoya Matsuzakaya, Aichi, Japan
  - ART FAIR TOKYO 2013, Tokyo International Forum, Tokyo, Japan
- 2012
  - MEME | Genes of Culture in Art - Exploration of Tradition, Technique and Modernity in Calligraphy, Copperplate Prints, and Japanese Paintings, Shibuya Hikarie, Tokyo, Japan
  - The 5th Kaii Higashiyama Memorial Award for Nikkei Nihonga Grand Prize, The Ueno Royal Museum, Tokyo, Japan
- 2011
  - "FANATIC MONOCHROME", spaceB, Kyoto, Japan
  - "ISETAN JAPAN SENSES", Shinjuku Isetan, Tokyo, Japan
- 2010
  - "BMW ART CAR", Hanshin BMW, Osaka, Japan
- 2009
  - "ART FAIR TOKYO 2009", Tokyo International Forum & TOKYO BLDG.TOKIA.GALLERIA, Tokyo, Japan
- 2008
  - "The 11th Exhibition of the Taro Okamoto Award for Contemporary Art", Taro Okamoto Museum of Art, Kanagawa, Japan
- 2008
  - "The 2nd Art Exchange Exhibition of the Osaka Seikei University and Chung-Ang University", Chung-Ang University, Seoul, Japan
- 2007
  - "The Kyoto Arts and Crafts Award for Spirited Young Artist 2007", The Museum of Kyoto, Kyoto, Japan
- 2006
  - "The Kyoto Art Center Summer Vacation Program – Under the Cloud", Kyoto Art Center, Kyoto, Japan
  - "Osaka Seikei University and Chung-Ang University Art Exchange Exhibition", TOPOHAUS GALLERY, Seoul, Japan
- 2005
  - "The Panorama Painting Exhibition", Tokushima Modern Art Museum, Tokushima, Japan
  - "Beyond the Image", GALLERY WKS, Osaka, Japan
  - "ART BEAT KYOTO 2005", Rissei school, ART ZONE, Shinpukan, Kyoto, Japan
- 2004
  - "ART UNIV. 2004", Campus Plaza Kyoto, Kyoto, Japan
  - "CANZUME", GALLERY MARONIE, Kyoto, Japan
  - "ALTERNATIVE MOOD OF YUZEN", Kyoto Art Center, Kyoto, Japan
  - "B-port", spaceB, Kyoto, Japan

== Awards ==
- 2016 The 8th Koji Kinutani Memorial Award, Nominee
- 2015 Towards a Celebration of 400 Years of Rimpa School of Japanese Painting, Nominee
- 2012 The 5th Kaii Higashiyama Memorial Award for Nikkei Nihonga Grand Prize, Nominee
- 2007 The 11th Exhibition of the Taro Okamoto Award for Contemporary Art, Nominee
- 2006 The Kyoto Arts and Crafts Award for Spirited Young Artist 2007, Nominee
- 2005 InterMedia Research Center, Osaka Seikei University – Student Exhibition Plan Competition 2006, winner

== Private collections ==
1223 GENDAIKAIGA – Contemporary Painting Collection, Tokyo, Japan
