= Masami Yoshida =

Masami Yoshida may refer to:

- Masami Yoshida (javelin thrower) (吉田 雅美, 1958–2000), Japanese javelin thrower
- Masami Yoshida (sprinter) (吉田 正美, born 1946), Japanese sprinter
