= Hirofumi Yoshida =

Japanese orchestral conductor

Hirofumi Yoshida (吉田 裕史, Yoshida Hirofumi; born 1968) is a Japanese conductor based in Italy. He is music director of the Filarmonica del Teatro Comunale di Modena and principal guest conductor of the Odesa National Academic Opera and Ballet Theatre. In 2024 he received a commendation from Japan's Minister of Education, Culture, Sports, Science and Technology.

== Education ==
Yoshida's parents, his father Toru from Tokyo and his mother Ayako from Hokkaido, send their son to the “Kōnodai High School”. Later, following his passion, Yoshida attends the Tokyo College of Music, where he specializes in piano with professor Yukiko Okafuji, in contrabass with Mitsuru Onozaki, in musicology with Reiko Arima and Tomiko Kojiba and in conduction with Yasuhiko Shiozawa, Jun-Ichi Hirokami and Yujiro Tsuda. Between 1994 and 1995, Yoshida move to Vienna to obtain the Music and Arts Master at Vienna's University with the masters Hans Graf and Julius Kalmar. In 1996, he obtained the Advanced Music Master at the Chigiana Academy of Music in Siena with the masters Juri Temirkanov e Myung-Whun Chung

== Career ==
In 2008, Yoshida conducted Don Carlos in Hong Kong. In January 2009, he was appointed music director at Teatro Sociale di Mantova, Mantua, Italy.

In March 2013, maestro Yoshida conducts Rigoletto at al Teatro Vittorio Emanuele II of Messina on the occasion of 200 years from Giuseppe Verdi's birth. In July 2013 the Bologna Opera House (Teatro Comunale of Bologna) invited Yoshida on the occasion of its 250th anniversary to conduct two Baroque opera programmes composed by Padre Martini: Il maestro di musica and Il Don Chisciotte. In October 2013 Maestro Yoshida conducted the same production at Kyoto Opera Festival, which is organised with the support of the Japanese government and whose Artistic Director is the same Hirofumi Yoshida. One of the recitals took place in Kiyomizu temple in Kyoto, which is UNESCO World Heritage site. It was the first time in Japan (Yokohama and Kyoto). It was the first time in the 1400 years of history of the temple that an opera performance was held in there. In the same year, Maestro Yoshida is awarded he was awarded the “Enrico Caruso” International Prize, which is conferred to Non-Italians who have made a great contribution to promoting Opera in Italy.

In 2014 Hirofumi Yoshida has been appointed Artistic Director of the Bologna Opera House Philharmonic Orchestra (Filarmonica del Teatro Comunale di Bologna, FTCB). On his debut concert Yoshida conducted Brahms's Violin Concerto in D major with Baiba Skride as soloist and Mozart's Symphony no. 41 Jupiter. At present Hirofumi Yoshida is also associate professor at Toho College of Music.

In February 2015 Hirofumi Yoshida conducted eight performances of Madama Butterfly at Bologna Opera House. In May–June 2015 he conducted 6 performances of Don Pasquale at Teatro Verdi in Trieste. In July 2015 he has been appointed Principal Guest Conductor of Bologna Opera House. During Kyoto Opera Festival 2015, in September, he conducted four performances of Leoncavallo's Pagliacci in Kyoto, in Tokyo and at the Himeji castle, a World Heritage Site.

To celebrate the New Year, on 1 January 2016 Hirofumi Yoshida conducted the first New Year's Concert in the history of Bologna. The event took place at Teatro Auditorium Manzoni with the performance of the Bologna Opera House Philharmonic Orchestra. Between May and June 2016 he conducted six performances of Le Nozze di Figaro at the Bologna Opera House in Bologna.

At present Hirofumi Yoshida is designated professor at Toho College of Music, in Japan.

Since 2021 he has been principal guest conductor of the Odesa National Academic Opera and Ballet Theatre.

Yoshida has been the music director of the Filarmonica del Teatro Comunale di Modena since its founding in 2022.

On 2 March 2025 he conducted the Odesa Opera orchestra at Kanagawa Prefectural Hall in Yokohama, in a Japan. The performance was organised by a committee whose core body is the Rising Sun Opera Foundation, of which he is artistic director.

In 2025 he led the Filarmonica del Teatro Comunale di Modena on a Japanese tour of three concerts: at the Shining Hat auditorium at Expo 2025 Osaka on September 10th, at Izumi Hall, Osaka on September 11th and on Amami Ōshima island on September 12th. The tour was presented as an official event of the Expo's Italian Week.

In 2026 the Italian label Tactus released Sinfonie Italiane (TD810005), a live recording of the Izumi Hall concert of September 11, 2025 with works by Mendelssohn, Rossini, Verdi and Mascagni.

== Awards ==
On 25 September 2024 he received a commendation from Japan's Minister of Education, Culture, Sports, Science and Technology for promoting Italian opera in Japan and abroad, and for contributing to the Japan–Ukraine musical exchange.

In 2005 he place third at the Bartok International Opera Conducting Competition

== Engagements ==
2007

- Thermae by Caracalla, Teatro dell'Opera di Roma, Rome Opera summer season
- Pagliacci with Carla Fracci (director), Teatro dell'Opera di Roma
- Romeo and Juliet with Carla Fracci (director), Teatro dell'Opera di Roma
- Aida by Verdi, Cairo National Theatre
- La Vida Breve by Antonia Marquez, Verdi Theatre, Trieste
- Tosca, Cluj-Napoca Opera Theatre, Romania

2008

- Madame Butterfly by Puccini, Cairo Opera House
- La Traviata by Verdi, Paris
- The Marriage of Figaro, Tokyo
- The tale of Genji by Minoru Miki, Japan
- Don Carlos, Hong Kong

2009

- Turandot by Pucinni, Marrucino Theatre, Chieti (in the presence of Simonetta Puccini)
- The Elixir of Love by Donizetti, San Carlo Theatre Orchestra, Ercolano
- The Marriage of Figaro by Mozart, Tokyo

2010

- Turandot by Puccini, with Maurizio Scaparro (director), Torre del Lago
- Rigoletto, Sociale Theatre, Mantua, Donizetti Theatre, Bergamo, Teatro del Giglio, Lucca

2011

- Cooperation between Yoshida, the Government of Japan, the Piemonte region and the Novara Council led to the 2011 Japan Festival with the support of the Japan Embassy and the General Consul Shigemi Jomori. With its strong cultural connection to Japan, Madame Butterfly was performed as well as works from the traditional ancient arts of Japan such as Kagura (music of the Gods). The director of the festival was Massimo Petruzzi
- Carlo Felice Theatre Orchestra, Genova
- 11 March 2011 Japan Tsunami concert, Requiem K 626 by Mozart, San Gaudezio Basilica with Toru Takemitsu.
- 29 April 2011, Madame Butterfly, Latvian National Opera, Riga.
- 17 September 2011, Capriccio Italien, 1812 Overture, and Symphony no. 5 in E-Minor by Tchaikovsky, Cairo Symphony Orchestra.

2012

- La Rondine by Puccini, Stefano Vizioli (director), Vittorio Emanuele Theatre, Messina
- "Piero Bellugi Memorial concert", Sonnambula by Bellini, The Music Park, Lyric Theatre of Cagliari, Italy

2013

- Rigoletto by Giuseppe Verdi, Messina Theatre, Messina
- Il maestro di musica and Il Don Chisciotteby Giovanni Battista Martini, Gabriele Marchesini (director), Bologna Opera House, Bologna and Kiyomizu-dera, Kyoto

2014

- Violin Concerto in D major by Johannes Brahms and Symphony no. 41 Jupiter by Wolfgang Amadeus Mozart, Bologna Opera House, Bologna
- Madama Butterfly by Giacomo Puccini, Nijō Castle, Kyoto

2015

- Madama Butterfly by Giacomo Puccini, Bologna Opera House, Bologna
- Don Pasquale by Gaetano Donizetti, Teatro Lirico Giuseppe Verdi, Trieste
- Pagliacci by Ruggero Leoncavallo, Himeji Castle, Himeji

2016

- The Marriage of Figaro by Wolfgang Amadeus Mozart, Bologna Opera House, Bologna
