= Masao Yoshida =

Masao Yoshida may refer to:

- Masao Yoshida (baseball) (吉田 正男, 1914–1996), Japanese baseball player
- Masao Yoshida (nuclear engineer) (吉田 昌郎, 1955–2013), Japanese nuclear engineer
- Masao Yoshida (politician), former House of Councillors member for the Niigata at-large district
- Masao Yoshida (flutist) (1915-2003), Japanese musician who studied with André Jaunet
- Masao Yoshida (sailor) (born 1932), Japanese Olympic sailor
