= 2005 in Japan =

- Decades: 1980s; 1990s; 2000s; 2010s; 2020s
- See also: Other events of 2005; History of Japan • Timeline • Years

Events in the year 2005 in Japan.

== Incumbents ==
- Emperor: Akihito
- Prime Minister: Junichiro Koizumi (L–Kanagawa)
- Chief Cabinet Secretary: Hiroyuki Hosoda (L–Shimane) to October 31, Shinzo Abe (L–Yamaguchi)
- Chief Justice of the Supreme Court: Akira Machida
- President of the House of Representatives: Yōhei Kōno (L–Kanagawa) to August 8 and again from September 21
- President of the House of Councillors: Chikage Ōgi (L–proportional)
- Diet sessions: 162nd (regular, January 21 to August 8), 163rd (special, September 26 to November 1) – 162nd and 163rd Diet are also often referred to as yūsei kokkai, "postal Diet"

=== Governors ===
- Aichi Prefecture: Masaaki Kanda
- Akita Prefecture: Sukeshiro Terata
- Aomori Prefecture: Shingo Mimura
- Chiba Prefecture: Akiko Dōmoto
- Ehime Prefecture: Moriyuki Kato
- Fukui Prefecture: Issei Nishikawa
- Fukuoka Prefecture: Wataru Asō
- Fukushima Prefecture: Eisaku Satō
- Gifu Prefecture: Taku Kajiwara (until 5 February); Hajime Furuta (starting 6 February)
- Gunma Prefecture: Hiroyuki Kodera
- Hiroshima Prefecture: Yūzan Fujita
- Hokkaido: Harumi Takahashi
- Hyogo Prefecture: Toshizō Ido
- Ibaraki Prefecture: Masaru Hashimoto
- Ishikawa Prefecture: Masanori Tanimoto
- Iwate Prefecture: Hiroya Masuda
- Kagawa Prefecture: Takeki Manabe
- Kagoshima Prefecture: Satoshi Mitazono
- Kanagawa Prefecture: Shigefumi Matsuzawa
- Kochi Prefecture: Daijiro Hashimoto
- Kumamoto Prefecture: Yoshiko Shiotani
- Kyoto Prefecture: Keiji Yamada
- Mie Prefecture: Akihiko Noro
- Miyagi Prefecture: Shirō Asano (until 21 November); Yoshihiro Murai (starting 21 November)
- Miyazaki Prefecture: Tadahiro Ando
- Nagano Prefecture: Yasuo Tanaka
- Nagasaki Prefecture: Genjirō Kaneko
- Nara Prefecture: Yoshiya Kakimoto
- Niigata Prefecture: Hirohiko Izumida
- Oita Prefecture: Katsusada Hirose
- Okayama Prefecture: Masahiro Ishii
- Okinawa Prefecture: Keiichi Inamine
- Osaka Prefecture: Fusae Ōta
- Saga Prefecture: Yasushi Furukawa
- Saitama Prefecture: Kiyoshi Ueda
- Shiga Prefecture: Yoshitsugu Kunimatsu
- Shiname Prefecture: Nobuyoshi Sumita
- Shizuoka Prefecture: Yoshinobu Ishikawa
- Tochigi Prefecture: Tomikazu Fukuda
- Tokushima Prefecture: Kamon Iizumi
- Tokyo: Shintarō Ishihara
- Tottori Prefecture: Yoshihiro Katayama
- Toyama Prefecture: Takakazu Ishii
- Wakayama Prefecture: Yoshiki Kimura
- Yamagata Prefecture: Kazuo Takahashi (until 13 February); Hiroshi Saitō (starting 14 February)
- Yamaguchi Prefecture: Sekinari Nii
- Yamanashi Prefecture: Takahiko Yamamoto

== Events ==
=== January ===
- January 1: The statute of limitations for murder cases is extended from 15 to 25 years.

=== February ===
- February 17: Chubu Centrair International Airport opens.

=== March ===
- March 2: A Nanpū express train on the Tosa Kuroshio Railway Sukumo Line derails and crashes into Sukumo Station, killing the train driver.
- March 16: The Shimane Prefecture assembly declares "Takeshima Day" to commemorate the centennial anniversary of Japan's claim to Liancourt Rocks (known as Takeshima in Japan, and Dokdo in Korea), starting a wave of protests in South Korea.
- March 20: 2005 Fukuoka earthquake

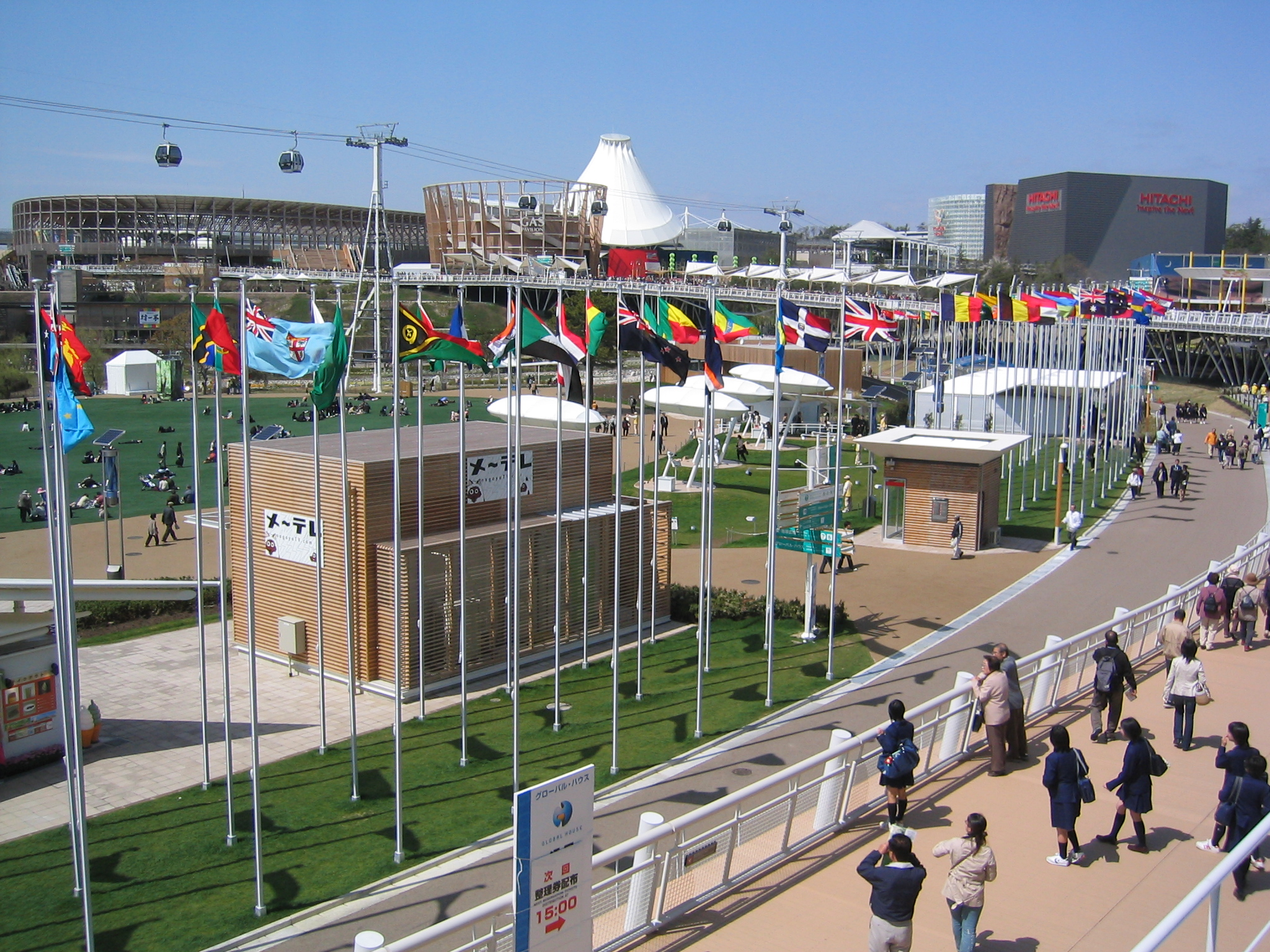
Expo 2005 in Aichi

- March 25:
  - Expo 2005 opens in Aichi Prefecture.
  - Lazytown premieres on TV Asahi, but it was not a success, airing its last on that channel 2 weeks later before moving to NHK General Television.

=== April ===
- April 1
  - Shizuoka City is designated by government ordinance.
  - The Japan-Mexico free trade agreement becomes effective
  - Tokyo Metropolitan University is established.
- April 20: A magnitude 5.8 earthquake hits Fukuoka Prefecture, injuring 56.
- April 25: 107 commuters are killed, 562 injured in the Amagasaki rail crash near Osaka.

=== May ===
- May 3: A Shizuoka Prefecture police helicopter crashes in Shizuoka city, killing five police officers who were on board.
- May 22: Prosecutors raided the offices of the 47 firms involved in the bridge scandal.

=== June ===
- June 23
  - 60th anniversary of the Battle of Okinawa – a ceremony to remember the dead is held at the Okinawa Prefectural Peace Park.
  - The first case of the H5N2 virus in Japan is discovered on a chicken farm in Jōsō, Ibaraki.

=== July ===
- July 15: Two tankers collide in the Kumano Sea, with one bursting into flames, resulting in one death.

=== August ===
- August 8: Postal service privatization, the keystone of Prime Minister Koizumi's platform, is voted down in the House of Councillors. Later in the day, Koizumi announces the dissolution of the House of Representatives and snap elections to be held the following month.7
- August 24: The Tsukuba Express line opens.

=== September ===
- September 11: Following a general election, the Liberal Democratic Party wins the largest House of Representatives majority in postwar history, holding a two-thirds supermajority along with coalition partner New Komeito.
- September 17: Seiji Maehara defeats Naoto Kan for the presidency of the Democratic Party of Japan.
- September 21: Koizumi is re-elected as prime minister at an extraordinary session of the Diet.
- September 25: Expo 2005 ends.

=== October ===
- October 1: Mitsubishi UFJ Financial Group is formed by the merger of two Japanese banking conglomerates.
- October 14: The Postal Privatisation Bill enters the Diet.
- October 17: Koizumi visits Yasukuni Shrine for the first time since 2004.
- October 31: Koizumi reshuffles his cabinet, naming Shinzo Abe as Chief Cabinet Secretary, Heizo Takenaka as Minister of Internal Affairs and Taro Aso as Minister of Foreign Affairs.

=== November ===
- November 15: Princess Sayako marries commoner Yoshiki Kuroda, thus giving up her imperial title.
- November 17: Structural Calculation Forgery Problem is discovered, and it becomes a serious social problem.

=== December ===
- December 25: An express train bound for the city of Niigata, Niigata Prefecture derails due to strong winds in Shonai, Yamagata Prefecture, killing 5 and injuring at least 33.

==== Date unknown ====
Japanese official abandoned national project and development of superconducting passenger ferry Techno Superliner, due to high fuel cost.

== Births ==
- February 6: Yuto Ozeki, footballer
- February 9: Ren Sato, distance runner
- February 10: Rio Suzuki, actress and tarento
- March 5: Kenshin Yasuda, footballer
- March 16: Mitsuki Kobayashi, pole vaulter
- March 26: Kento Shiogai, footballer
- April 3: Shunta Ikeda, footballer
- April 10: Tomoyasu Hamasaki, footballer
- April 11: Sota Namikawa, distance runner
- April 26: Tatsuya Miyazaki, footballer
  - May 1:
- Mone Chiba, figure skater
- Shun Miyake, distance runner
- May 7: Momoko Tanikawa, footballer
- May 9: Yuujiro Koshiba, distance runner
- May 10: Nelson Ishiwatari, footballer
- May 17: Syunsuke Kuwata, distance runner
- May 28: Yudai Okimoto, badminton player
- June 3: Keisuke Gotō, footballer
- June 6: Soma Santoki, actor
  - June 8:
- Shunsuke Nakamura, figure skater
- Kao Miura, figure skater
- June 12: Kaito Iida, distance runner
- June 17: Funa Nakayama, Olympic skateboarder
- June 24: Taisei Endo, distance runner
- July 7: Uche Brian Seo Nwadike, footballer
- July 13: Yuna Nagaoka, figure skater
- August 1: Tomoyuki Matsushita, swimmer
- August 3: Kosuke Hara, footballer
- August 21: Hana Yoshida, figure skater
- August 30: Kaisei Okada, distance runner
- September 12: Rinto Hanashiro, footballer
- September 20: Masataka Kobayashi, footballer
- September 21: Yu Miyazaki, distance runner
- October 4: Rina Endō, actress
- October 25: Ryuki Kobayashi, distance runner
- October 27: Ri Kyong-su, North Korean footballer
- October 29: Azusa Tanaka, figure skater
- November 5: Hikaru Ogawara, distance runner
- November 7: Yuta Asano, distance runner
- December 5: Junpei Hayakawa, footballer

== Deaths ==
- January 4: Kishibe Shigeo, musicologist (born 1912)
- January 14: Takeshi Suzuki, professor of Urdu (born 1932)
- January 16: Yoshito Matsushige, photojournalist (born 1913)
- January 23: Mutsuko Sakura, actress (born 1921)
- February 19: Kihachi Okamoto, film director (born 1924)
- February 28: Yukio Koshimori, politician (born 1930)
- March 6: Sadako Kurihara, poet (born 1913)
- March 22: Kenzo Tange, architect (born 1913)
- April 20: Fumio Niwa, author (born 1904)
- May 23: Tetsuya Ishida, painter (born 1973)
- June: Satoru Anabuki, flying ace (born 1921)
- June 10: Yumiko Kurahashi, writer (born 1935)
- June 28: Yumika Hayashi, AV idol and pink film actress (born 1970)
- July 11: Shinya Hashimoto, wrestler (born 1965)
- July 16: Gu, Prince Imperial Hoeun (born 1931)
- July 19: Toku Nishio, actor and voice actor (born 1939)
- August 12: Teruo Ishii, film director (born 1924)
- November 4: Hiro Takahashi, singer, lyricist, and composer (born 1964)
- November 4: Mana Nishiura, drummer (born 1971)
- November 6: Minako Honda, idol pop star and singer (born 1967)
- November 22: Airi Kinoshita, murder victim (born 1998)
- November 25: Yoshio Shiga, fighter ace (born 1914)
- November 26: Takanori Arisawa, composer and arranger (born 1951)
- November 30: Masao Sasakibara, fighter ace (born 1921)

== See also ==
- 2005 in Japanese television
- List of Japanese films of 2005

== Statistics ==
- Wealthiest person in Japan: Nobutada Saji (net worth US$5.8 billion)
