= 2003 in Japan =

- Decades: 1980s; 1990s; 2000s; 2010s; 2020s
- See also: Other events of 2003; History of Japan • Timeline • Years

Events in the year 2003 in Japan.

== Incumbents ==
- Emperor: Akihito
- Prime Minister: Junichiro Koizumi (L–Kanagawa)
- Chief Cabinet Secretary: Yasuo Fukuda (L–Gunma)
- Chief Justice of the Supreme Court: Akira Machida
- President of the House of Representatives: Tamisuke Watanuki (L–Toyama) until October 10, Yōhei Kōno (L–Kanagawa) from November 19
- President of the House of Councillors: Hiroyuki Kurata (L–Chiba)
- Diet sessions: 156th (regular, January 20 to July 28), 157th (extraordinary, September 26 to October 10), 158th (special, November 21)

=== Governors ===
- Aichi Prefecture: Masaaki Kanda
- Akita Prefecture: Sukeshiro Terata
- Aomori Prefecture: Morio Kimura (until 1 July); Shingo Mimura (starting 1 July)
- Chiba Prefecture: Akiko Dōmoto
- Ehime Prefecture: Moriyuki Kato
- Fukui Prefecture: Yukio Kurita (until 22 April); Issei Nishikawa (starting 23 April)
- Fukuoka Prefecture: Wataru Asō
- Fukushima Prefecture: Eisaku Satō
- Gifu Prefecture: Taku Kajiwara
- Gunma Prefecture: Hiroyuki Kodera
- Hiroshima Prefecture: Yūzan Fujita
- Hokkaido: Tatsuya Hori (until 22 April); Harumi Takahashi (starting 23 April)
- Hyogo Prefecture: Toshizō Ido
- Ibaraki Prefecture: Masaru Hashimoto
- Ishikawa Prefecture: Masanori Tanimoto
- Iwate Prefecture: Hiroya Masuda
- Kagawa Prefecture: Takeki Manabe
- Kagoshima Prefecture: Tatsurō Suga
- Kanagawa Prefecture: Hiroshi Okazaki (until 22 April); Shigefumi Matsuzawa (starting 23 April)
- Kochi Prefecture: Daijiro Hashimoto
- Kumamoto Prefecture: Yoshiko Shiotani
- Kyoto Prefecture: Keiji Yamada
- Mie Prefecture: Masayasu Kitagawa (until 21 April) Akihiko Noro (starting 21 April)
- Miyagi Prefecture: Shirō Asano
- Miyazaki Prefecture: Suketaka Matsukata (until 4 August); Tadahiro Ando (starting 5 August)
- Nagano Prefecture: Yasuo Tanaka
- Nagasaki Prefecture: Genjirō Kaneko
- Nara Prefecture: Yoshiya Kakimoto
- Niigata Prefecture: Ikuo Hirayama
- Oita Prefecture: Morihiko Hiramatsu (until 27 April); Katsusada Hirose (starting 28 April)
- Okayama Prefecture: Masahiro Ishii
- Okinawa Prefecture: Keiichi Inamine
- Osaka Prefecture: Fusae Ōta
- Saga Prefecture: Isamu Imoto (until 22 April); Yasushi Furukawa (starting 23 April)
- Saitama Prefecture:
  - until 18 July: Yoshihiko Tsuchiya
  - 18 July-31 July: Nobuyuki Aoki
  - starting 31 August: Kiyoshi Ueda
- Shiga Prefecture: Yoshitsugu Kunimatsu
- Shiname Prefecture: Nobuyoshi Sumita
- Shizuoka Prefecture: Yoshinobu Ishikawa
- Tochigi Prefecture: Akio Fukuda
- Tokushima Prefecture: Tadashi Ōta (until 30 March); Kamon Iizumi (starting 18 May)
- Tokyo: Shintarō Ishihara
- Tottori Prefecture: Yoshihiro Katayama
- Toyama Prefecture: Yutaka Nakaoki
- Wakayama Prefecture: Yoshiki Kimura
- Yamagata Prefecture: Kazuo Takahashi
- Yamaguchi Prefecture: Sekinari Nii
- Yamanashi Prefecture: Ken Amano (until 2 February); Takahiko Yamamoto (starting 2 February)

== Events ==
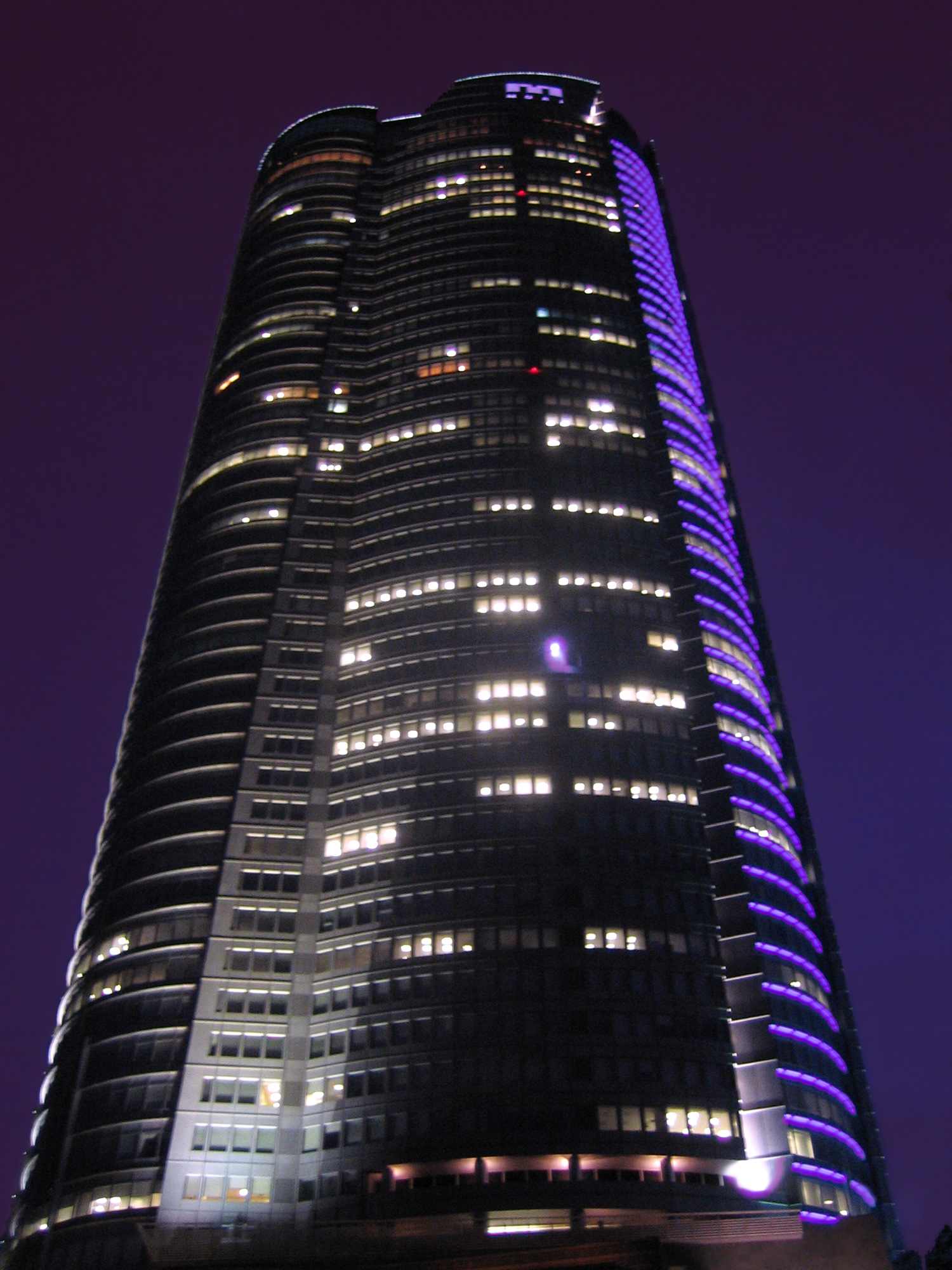
Mori Tower, the centerpiece of Roppongi Hills, opened in April.

=== January ===
- January: Toyota launches all-new Avensis to be built in Britain.
- January 14: Koizumi visits the Yasukuni Shrine.
- January 27: All Nippon Airways Flight 908 overshoots the runway at Narita International Airport.
- January 29: Asashōryū Akinori becomes the first Mongol to reach the rank of yokozuna in sumo wrestling.

=== March ===
- March 19: Extension of the Eidan Hanzomon Line from Suitengumae to Oshiage becomes operational.
- March 31: Agriculture Minister Tadamori Oshima resigns due to a farm subsidy scandal; Koizumi replaces him with Yoshiyuki Kamei.

=== April ===
- April 1
  - The Postal Agency becomes Japan Post, a public corporation.
  - Saitama becomes a city designated by government ordinance.
  - Square Co., Ltd. and Enix Corporation merge to become Square Enix.
- April 11: An explosion at a fireworks factory in Kagoshima kills 10.
- April 15: Tokyo Disneyland celebrates its 20th anniversary.
- April 25: Grand opening of Roppongi Hills.

=== May ===
- May 9: The uncrewed spacecraft Hayabusa is launched from Uchinoura Space Center.

=== July ===
- July 7: Noto Airport opens.
- July 26: Diet of Japan authorizes the deployment of Japanese troops to Iraq.

=== August ===
- August 10: Okinawa Urban Monorail opens.

=== September ===
- September 20: Koizumi announces a new cabinet: Taro Aso becomes Minister of Internal Affairs, Shoichi Nakagawa becomes Minister of Economy, Trade and Industry, Sadakazu Tanigaki becomes Minister of Finance and Yuriko Koike becomes Minister of Environment.
- September 23: Nissan begins production at a plant in Canton, Mississippi, United States.
- September 26
  - The Liberal Party merges into the Democratic Party of Japan.
  - 2003 Tokachi earthquake, a Richter magnitude scale 8.3 earthquake, following Richter magnitude scale 7.4 aftershock hit off south eastern Hokkaido, according to Japan Fire and Disaster and Management Agency official confirmed report, two persons lives with 849 person were wounded.

=== October ===
- October 1: Shinagawa Station opens platforms for the Tōkaidō Shinkansen.
- October 10
  - House of Representatives is dissolved.
  - The last wild crested ibis in Japan dies.

=== November ===
- November 9: In the 2003 general election, the Democratic Party of Japan realizes a slight gain against the ruling Liberal Democratic Party.

== Births ==
- January 29: Shiho Kuwaki, professional golfer
- March 3: Momoko Okazaki, singer (Babymetal)
- May 19: Daiken Okudaira, actor
- November 1: Kanon Kasuga, actress

== Deaths ==
- January 12: Kinji Fukasaku, film director
- February 28: Yō Inoue, voice actress
- March 25: Masato Furuoya, actor
- April 1: Mutsuhiro Watanabe, soldier and war criminal
- April 7: Masato Yamanouchi, voice actor
- April 8: Maki Ishii, composer
- April 17: Koji Kondo, football player
- April 20: Daijiro Kato, motorcycle racer
- May 1: Kenji Yoshida, animation film director and film producer
- July 8: Etsuko Inada, figure skater
- September 5: Yūji Aoki, manga artist
- October 11: Sadateru Arikawa, aikido teacher
- October 23: Hiroshi Yoshimura, musician
- November 1: Toshitaka Shimizu, voice actor
- November 13: Mitoyo Kawate, oldest person in the world
- December 26: Yoshio Shirai, boxer
- Undated: Masahiro Yoshimura, swimmer

== See also ==
- 2003 in Japanese television
- List of Japanese films of 2003
