= 2007 Miyazaki gubernatorial by-election =

← 2003	21 January 2007	2010 →
- Turnout: 64.85
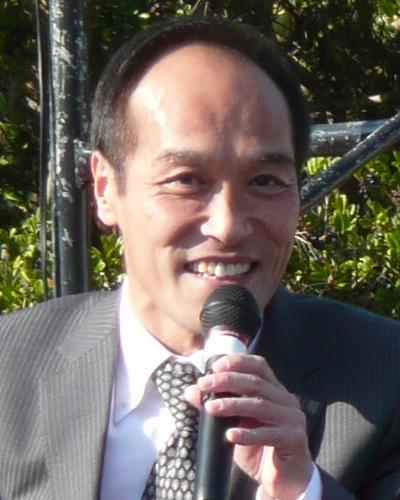
Candidate	Higashi Sonomanma	Hidesaburō Kawamura
Party	Independent	Independent
Popular vote	266,807	195,124
Governor before election
Tadahiro Ando
Independent
Elected Governor
Higashi Sonomanma
Independent

Miyazaki Prefecture held a gubernatorial by-election on January 21, 2007. Former governor Tadahiro Ando was arrested for bid-rigging. Independent comedian Hideo Higashikokubaru (running under the name "Higashi Sonomanma") won.

Gubernatorial by-election 2007: Miyazaki Prefecture
Party	Candidate	Votes	%	±%
Independent	Higashi Sonomanma (そのまんま 東)	266,807		
LDP	Hidesaburō Kawamura (川村 秀三郎)	195,124		
Independent	Tetsuji Mochinaga (持永 哲志)	120,825		
JCP	Tadakatsu Tsushima (津島 忠勝)	14,358		
Independent	Nobuhiro Takeda (武田 信弘)	3,574		
Turnout		600,688	64.85	5.51
