= 2005 Japanese bridge scandal =

The 2005 Japanese bridge scandal (橋梁談合事件, Kyōryō dangō jiken, 'Bridge bid-rigging case') was centered around the use of bid-rigging between 47 colluding Japanese firms and Japan Highway Public Corporation (JH) in the granting of contracts to build steel bridges in violation of Japanese competition law. It was the biggest such scandal in the history of the nation up to that point, with an estimated 23.5 billion Japanese yen of unfair gains over fiscal years 2003 and 2004.

== Background and history ==
The scandal is one example of the long-time practice of dango, where construction companies and bureaucrats exchange favors and kickbacks for a mutually beneficial outcome, causing less competition and increased costs for public infrastructure. In this case, former executives of JH had been given jobs in private firms in exchange for unreleased information about JH construction projects, part of a tradition known as amakudari (天下り, "descent from heaven"). This had an effect on the public purse: an example is where contracts for bridges in Shizuoka Prefecture unfairly awarded in May 2004 increased JH's expenses by 45.7 million yen (US$445,000). The parties involved included major steel companies such as Kobe Steel and Nippon Steel, as well as conglomerates such as Nippon Sharyo and Kawasaki. They were represented by two bodies: A-kai (A association) and K-Kai (K-association), which have reportedly existed since 1960. Businesses in both organizations had successfully netted most of the infrastructure orders between FY2002 and FY2004 put forward by regional bureaus of the Ministry of Land, Infrastructure, Transport and Tourism (MLIT).

== Investigation ==
On 22 May 2005, prosecutors raided the offices of the 47 firms involved, with eight in particular being focused on. Four days later, employees of 11 companies, including the eight previously scrutinized, were arrested. The then-vice president of JH, Michio Usida, was taken into custody on 25 July and fired from his position on 22 August. On 24 March 2006, the Fair Trade Commission of Japan ordered 44 companies to pay over 12.9 billion yen in surcharges to JH and the MLIT.

== Aftermath ==
The Japanese government amended and strengthened anti-bid-rigging laws in light of the scandal as well others around the same time. By 2009, it was determined that many of these measures worked, with a substantial decrease in noncompetitive bidding.
