= Japanese Society for Rights of Authors, Composers and Publishers =

Japanese rights society

Coordinates: 35°40′4.5″N 139°40′48.8″E

- Type: licensing and royalties
- Founded: 1939
- Headquarters: 3-6-12 Uehara, Shibuya, Tokyo, Japan
- Key people: Haku Ide (Chairman)
- Website: www.jasrac.or.jp

The Japanese Society for Rights of Authors, Composers and Publishers (社団法人日本音楽著作権協会, Shadanhōjin Nihon Ongaku Chosakuken Kyōkai), often referred to as JASRAC, is a Japanese copyright collection society. It was founded in 1939 as a nonprofit organization, and is the largest musical copyright administration society in Japan.

== Overview ==
JASRAC's main business activity is to act as trustee of copyright rights such as recording and performing rights for songwriters, lyricists, and music publishers. It manages licensing to music users, collects license fees, and distributes the same to the rights holders. It also supervises copyright infringements and prosecutes infringers. Because JASRAC is a foundation, it is subject to the General Foundation and Estate Foundation Act subject to the rules non-profit management.

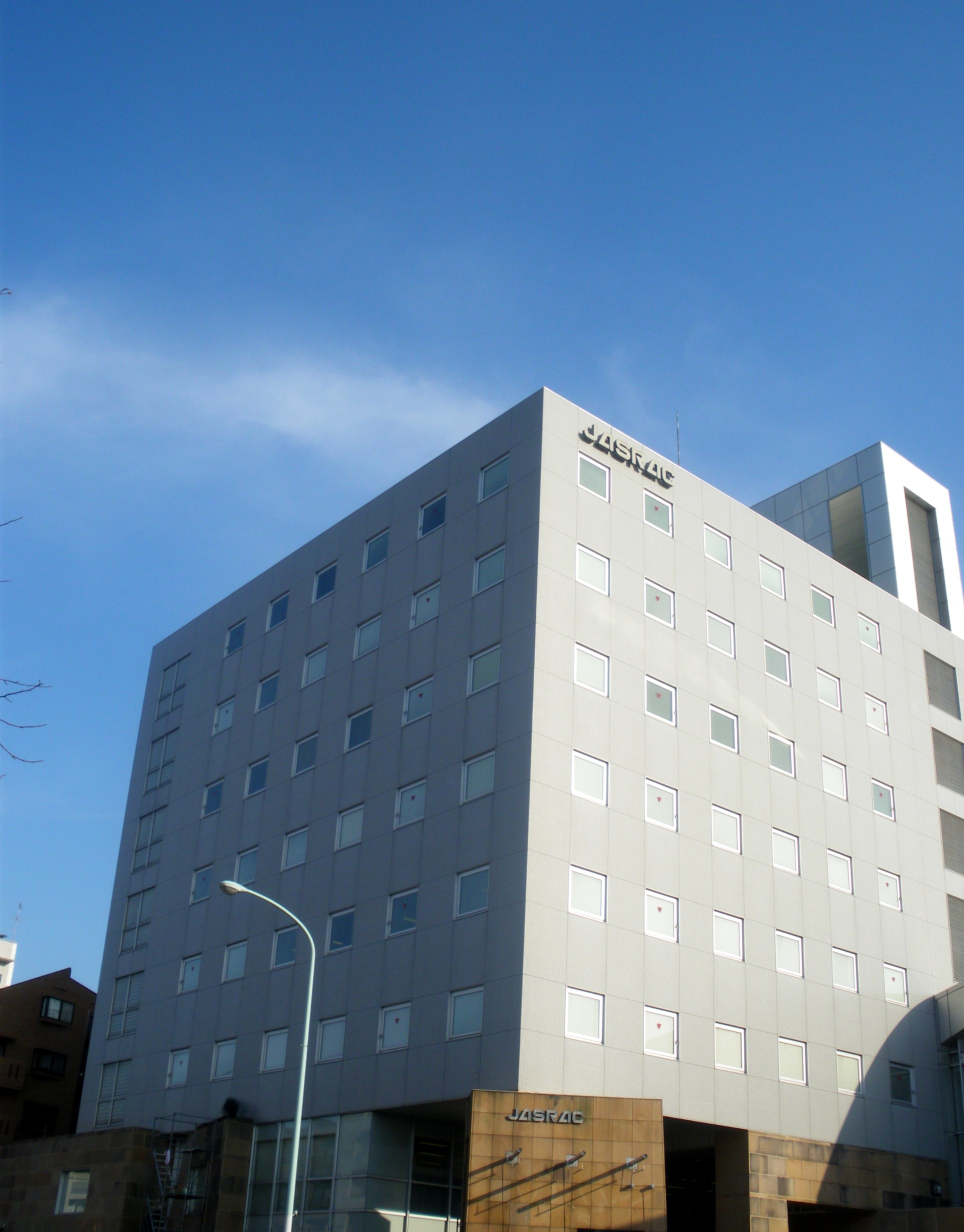
Head office located in Uehara, Shibuya, Tokyo

The headquarters is located in Shibuya, Tokyo, in a building owned by the Masao Koga Music Cultural Memorial Foundation. It has 22 branches in major cities of Japan. JASRAC was established in 1939 with the predecessor Great Japan Music Association, and is the oldest copyright management company in Japan.

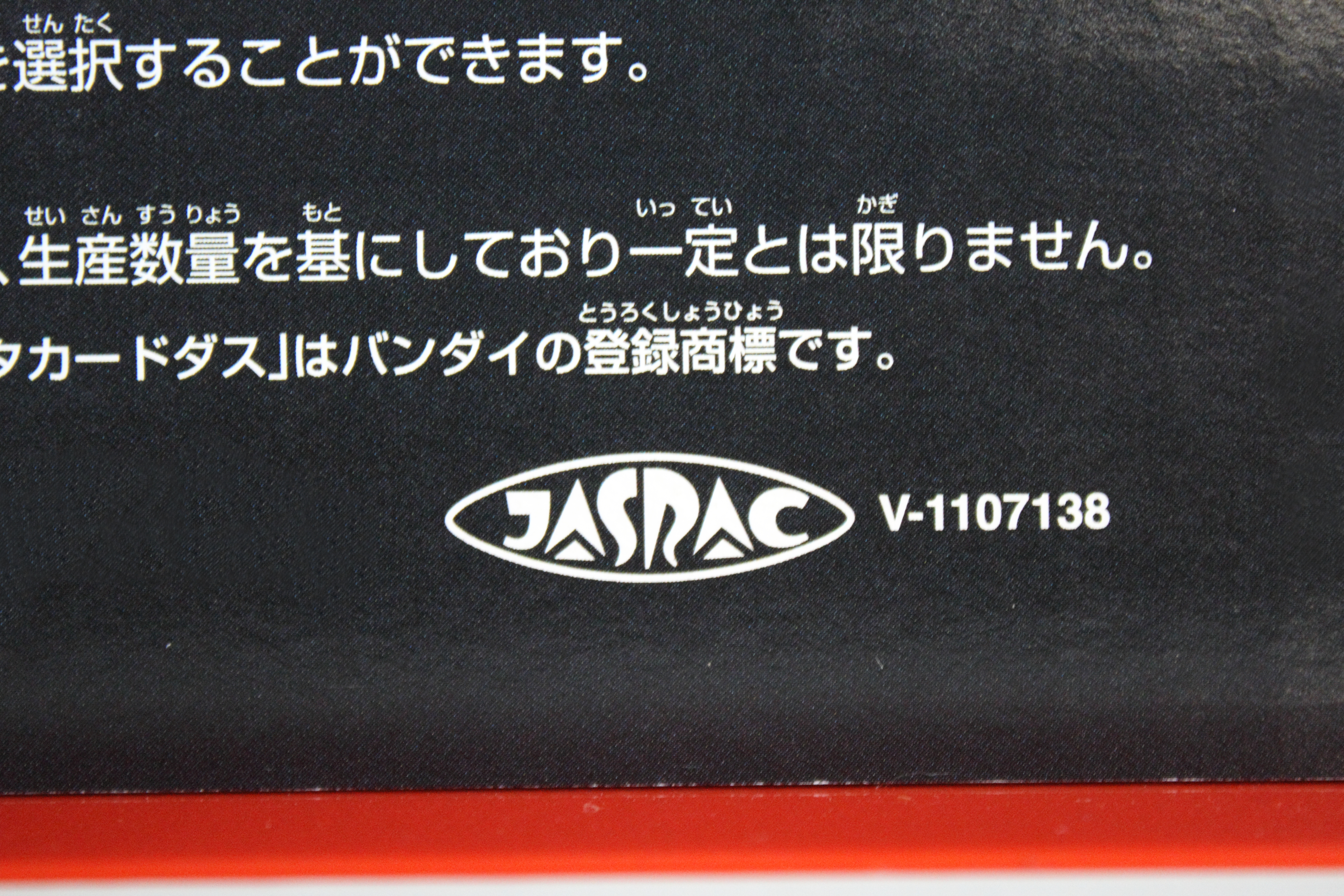
JASRAC License mark on Compact discs and other physical media

== History ==
=== Plage Whirlwind ===
In 1899, Japan joined the Berne Convention where the Copyright law was enforced. However, there was no concept on how to pay royalties for recorded songs for each live performance. In 1931, Wilhelm Plage), a German teacher at the imperial First High School under the old system, established a copyright management organization called "Plage Institution" in Tokyo, and worked to acquire the agency rights for Japan from a European copyright management organization. The Plage Institution began requesting music usage fees to all businesses using music, such as broadcasting stations and orchestras.

As the license fees requests of Plage were at the time extralegal and their enforcement included pressurizing, the use of compositions outside Japan became difficult. Even NHK was deadlocked in negotiations with the Plage Institution for over one year, and was not able to broadcast foreign music pieces. Plage also began to urge Japanese artists to let the Plage Institute act as the agent for their copyright management. Though he pursued both monetary goals and proper management of copyrights, he wasn't able to bridge the gap to the music users, and the acquisition of agency rights from Japanese authors caused further uproar. These incidents were called the "Plage Whirlwind" and triggered concentration management of copyright in Japan.

=== Establishment of the Copyright Brokerage Business Act ===
In order to develop the situation, in 1939, the copyright brokerage act (著作権に関する仲介業務に関する法律) was enacted providing that only holders of permission from the Ministry of Home Affairs (Japan) can undertake copyright brokerage business, and the predecessor of JASRAC (Japanese Society for Rights of Authors, Composers and Publishers), the Great Japanese Music Copyright Association, was established and started operation in 1940. Plage was excluded from copyright management work, received a fine for violating this law, and left Japan in 1941. The Agency for Cultural Affairs granted permission of brokerage business to four organizations, including the Great Japan Music Association, and other organizations. They didn't allow other entry, and the mediation of music copyright became the monopoly business of the Great Japan Music Association.

== Video-sharing site ==
In 2006, JASRAC took legal action by requesting that nearly 30,000 videos featuring songs or clips that violated the copyrights of Sony Music Entertainment Japan, Avex Japan, Pony Canyon, JVC Victor, Warner Japan, Toy's Factory, and Universal Japan be removed from YouTube.

== Trial and criticism ==
In April 2008, Japan Fair Trade Commission (JFTC) officials raided the society's Tokyo headquarters on suspicion of violating Japan's Antimonopoly Act. In February 2009, the JFTC ruled that the system prevents other companies from entering the copyright-fee collection and management business.

In February 2009, a cease-and-desist order was issued by the JFTC for allegedly breaking the Antimonopoly Act, demanding that the society end its blanket-fee system. Under that system, radio and TV stations are allowed unlimited use of JASRAC-managed music copyrights for a flat fee of 1.5% of their annual broadcasting revenue. The order was withdrawn, however, in June 2012.

On 1 November 2013, in response to a petition by rival e-License Inc., the Intellectual Property High Court, a special branch of the Tokyo High Court that settles patent disputes, declared that JASRAC's fee levying system impeded competition within the industry and made it extremely difficult for other organizations to enter the market.

In February 2017, JASRAC sparked a controversy that they announced they would start collecting copyright fees off of music schools. In response to this, many schools, including Yamaha Music Foundation across Japan filed a petition, arguing that it would lead to increased tuition rates. In October 2022, the Supreme Court of Japan considered music schools shouldn't pay copyright fees because students play music. Facilities are still subject to copyright for music performed by teachers.

== JASRAC Awards ==
Established in 1982, the annual JASRAC Awards honors the lyricists, composers, and music publishers whose works received the largest share of royalties from JASRAC—earned through music distribution, karaoke usage, features in commercials etc.—in a given fiscal year (e.g. April 2020–May 2021). Gold, Silver, and Bronze awards are given to the top three of the top ten domestic songs with the most royalties distributed, the International Award is given to the domestic song that received the most royalties from overseas copyright management organizations, and the Foreign Work Award is given to the non-Japanese song that earned the most royalties domestically. In 2003, the background music for Hayao Miyazaki's Spirited Away became the first instrumental work to win the Gold Award. In 2012, JASRAC awarded SMAP's "Sekai ni Hitotsu Dake no Hana" as the song with the most royalties earned in the ceremony's 30-year history. As of 2025, five songs have won the Gold Award for two consecutive years: Eiko Segawa's "Inochi Kurenai" (1988 and 1989); SMAP's "Sekai ni Hitotsu Dake no Hana" (2004 and 2005); AKB48's "Heavy Rotation" (2012 and 2013); LiSA's "Gurenge" (2021 and 2022), and Yoasobi's "Idol".

== See also ==
- Recording Industry Association of Japan
