= List of Japanese films of 2003 =

== Highest-grossing films ==
Rank	Title	Gross
1	Bayside Shakedown 2	¥17.35 billion
2	Pokémon: Jirachi—Wish Maker	¥4.50 billion
3	Detective Conan: Crossroad in the Ancient Capital	¥3.20 billion
4	Yomigaeri	¥3.07 billion
5	Zatōichi	¥2.85 billion

== List of films ==
A list of films released in Japan in 2003 (see 2003 in film).

Title	Director	Cast	Genre	Notes
2LDK				
Abaranger Deluxe				
Adulterous Wife's Dirty Afternoon	Yutaka Ikejima	Motoko Sasaki	Pink	Silver Prize & Best Actress, Pink Grand Prix
Ambiguous	Toshiya Ueno	Hidehisa Ebata, Noriko Murayama, Nikki Sasaki, Minami Aoyama, Akio Kurauchi, Yôta Kawase, Suzuka Takaki, Mika Ogawa	Pink	Best Film, Pink Grand Prix
The Animatrix	Koji Morimoto	Hedy Burress, James Arnold Taylor	Action, Sci-fi	
The Blue Light	Yukio Ninagawa	Kazunari Ninomiya, Aya Matsuura, Anne Suzuki, Kumiko Akiyoshi	Drama, crime, romance	
Azumi	Ryuhei Kitamura	Aya Ueto	Action, Samurai film	
Battle Royale 2: Requiem				
Battlefield Baseball	Yūdai Yamaguchi		Comedy	
Bright Future	Kiyoshi Kurosawa			Entered into the 2003 Cannes Film Festival
Café Lumière	Hou Hsiao-hsien	Yo Hitoto, Tadanobu Asano	Drama	
Children Full of Life	Noboru Kaetsu		Documentary	Won the Banff World Media Festival Rocky Award in 2004
Chirusoku no natsu	Kiyoshi Sasabe			
Crayon Shin-chan: Glorious Grilled Meat Road				
Detective Conan: Crossroad in the Ancient Capital				
Doppelganger	Kiyoshi Kurosawa	Kōji Yakusho, Hiromi Nagasaku	Thriller	
Dragon Head	Jōji Iida	Satoshi Tsumabuki, Sayaka Kanda	Disaster film	
The Glamorous Life of Sachiko Hanai	Mitsuru Meike	Emi Kuroda	Pink	
Godzilla: Tokyo S.O.S.				
Gozu	Takashi Miike		Horror	
Inuyasha the Movie: Swords of an Honorable Ruler				
Ju-on: The Grudge	Takashi Shimizu	Megumi Okina	Horror	Re-make of Ju-on 1
Ju-on: The Grudge 2	Takashi Shimizu	Noriko Sakai	Horror	Re-make of Ju-on 2
Kamen Rider 555: Paradise Lost				
A Lonely Cow Weeps at Dawn	Daisuke Gotō	Horyu Nakamura, Ryoko Asagi	Pink	
One Piece the Movie: Dead End Adventure		Mayumi Tanaka, Kazuya Nakai, Akemi Okamura, Kappei Yamaguchi, Hiroaki Hirata, Ikue Ōtani, Yuriko Yamaguchi		
Onmyoji II				
Owl	Kaneto Shindo			Entered into the 25th Moscow International Film Festival
Poketto Monsutā Adobansu Jenerēshon The Wishing Star of Seven Nights Jirāchi				
Shara	Naomi Kawase			Entered into the 2003 Cannes Film Festival
Tokyo Godfathers	Satoshi Kon		Comedy drama anime	
Ultraman Cosmos vs. Ultraman Justice: The Final Battle		Kaori Sakagami, Hidekazu Ichinose		
Watashi no Grandpa				
When the Last Sword Is Drawn	Yōjirō Takita	Kiichi Nakai		Japan Academy Prize for Best Film
Winning Pass	Kenichi Matsuyama		Basketball drama	
Zatōichi	Takeshi Kitano	Takeshi Kitano, Tadanobu Asano	Samurai Geisha Swordsman drama	

== See also ==
- 2003 in Japan
- 2003 in Japanese television
