= Hideo Higashikokubaru =

Japanese actor-politician

- 東国原 英夫
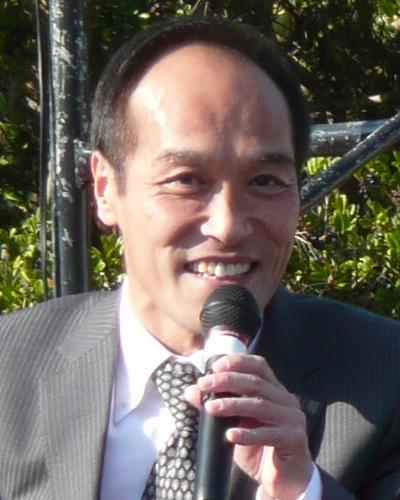

Member of the House of Representatives
- In office 21 December 2012 – 17 December 2013
- Preceded by: Multi-member district
- Succeeded by: Koichiro Shimizu
- Constituency: Kinki PR

Governor of Miyazaki Prefecture
- In office 23 January 2007 – 20 January 2011
- Monarch: Akihito
- Preceded by: Tadahiro Ando
- Succeeded by: Shunji Kōno

Personal details
- Born: 16 September 1957 (age 69) Miyakonojō, Miyazaki, Japan
- Party: Independent (2007–2012; 2013–present)
- Other political affiliations: Restoration (2012–2013)
- Spouse: Kazuko Kato (m. 1990; div. 2006)
- Education: Senshu University
- Occupation: Politician, comedian, actor
- Website: Official website

Hideo Higashikokubaru (東国原 英夫, Higashikokubaru Hideo; born 16 September 1957) is a Japanese politician. He originally rose to fame as a comedian and actor under the stage name Sonomanma Higashi (そのまんま東; literally "Higashi without change" or "simply Higashi"), and was known for his role in the popular game show Takeshi's Castle.

He served as the governor of Miyazaki Prefecture from 2007 to 2011, resigning to run against incumbent Shintarō Ishihara for Governor of Tokyo in the 2011 election, where he came in second. He was elected to the House of Representatives in the general election of 2012, but resigned in December 2013.

== Early life ==
Higashikokubaru was born in Miyakonojō, a city in Miyazaki Prefecture and attended Senshu University from 1976 to 1980, where he majored in economics. After graduating from Senshu, Higashikokubaru apprenticed to Takeshi Kitano and became a comedian in 1982.

He appeared on Takeshi's Castle, which was dubbed on United States television as Most Extreme Elimination Challenge (MXC); Higashikokubaru was dubbed as "Kenny Blankenship" in the American version.

== Incidents ==
On December 9, 1986, Higashi was one of those who were arrested at the offices of Friday magazine, after he and other members of Takeshi Kitano's group attacked the magazine offices (among others spraying fire extinguishers) to protest a critical article about Takeshi Kitano that the magazine had published. All attackers were sentenced to six months in prison, suspended for two years.

On October 13, 1998, a manager of a so-called image club (a type of brothel) was arrested for employing underage girls. A 16-year-old employee pointed Higashi out as one of her customers. He was interrogated several times by the police, but was not indicted as he claimed he did not know the girl was under 18. His then-wife apologized on his behalf to the Japanese public via the media, and he himself took a five-month voluntary break from his work as an entertainer.

On November 22, 1999, at a year-end-party held for Takeshi Kitano office employees, he kicked another participant in the head, injuring him. He was prosecuted for this, and fined, after which he again took a voluntary leave from his entertainment activity.

Higashikokubaru shifted his interest to politics around 1999 after being involved in these publicized incidents. He enrolled in the School of Letters, Arts and Sciences II at Waseda University in 2000, and graduated in March 2004, re-entering as a politics and economics student in April 2004. He divorced from his wife in February 2006 and dropped out of Waseda in March 2006.

== Governor of Miyazaki ==
On January 21, 2007, Higashi was elected governor of Miyazaki Prefecture, replacing former governor Tadahiro Ando, who resigned after being arrested for bid rigging. He used his official name (Hideo Higashikokubaru) as governor of Miyazaki.

He declared a state of emergency in Miyazaki during a major outbreak of foot-and-mouth disease in May 2010.

He decided not to run for re-election in 2010, and left office on January 20, 2011.

== Later activity ==
Higashikokubaru ran in the Tokyo gubernatorial election on April 10, 2011, in which he lost to incumbent governor Shintarō Ishihara.

Both Higashikokubaru and Ishihara ran as proportional representation candidates for the Japan Restoration Party in the December 2012 general election for the House of Representatives.

Higashikokubaru resigned from the JRP in December 2013 stating that "the political ideology and policies of the Japan Restoration Party as well as their directions have changed and they are now far different from mine."

Following the resignation of Tokyo governor Naoki Inose on December 19, Higashikokubaru was widely rumored to be a potential candidate for the gubernatorial election in February 2014. He denied that he had resigned in order to run for the governorship, saying "the timing is a little too good. People would suspect I'm up to something. I'm not. For me, [Inose's resignation] is just troublesome." On January 10 he stated that he had "2,000%" "no scheme, plan, or intention" to run.

== Personal ==
Higashikokubaru is an active runner and has completed several marathons. He ran the Lake Saroma 100 km (62 mi) ultra-marathon in 13 hours in June 1995, and has also run the Gold Coast Marathon and Okinawa Marathon three times each. He also played handball in high school and competed in the National Sports Festival of Japan in 1975.

== Filmography ==
=== Movies ===
- Shōjo (2001)
- Getting Any? (1995)
- Shishiohtachi no natsu (1991)
- Ultraman Saga (2012)

=== Television ===
- Waratteru Baai desu yo! (1980)
- Oretachi Hyokinzoku (1981–1989)
- Owarai Star Tanjo (1983)
- Super Jocky (1983–1990)
- Takeshi's Castle (1986–1990)
- Darenimo ienai (1993)
