= Hirayama Ikuo Silk Road Museum =

- 平山郁夫シルクロード美術館
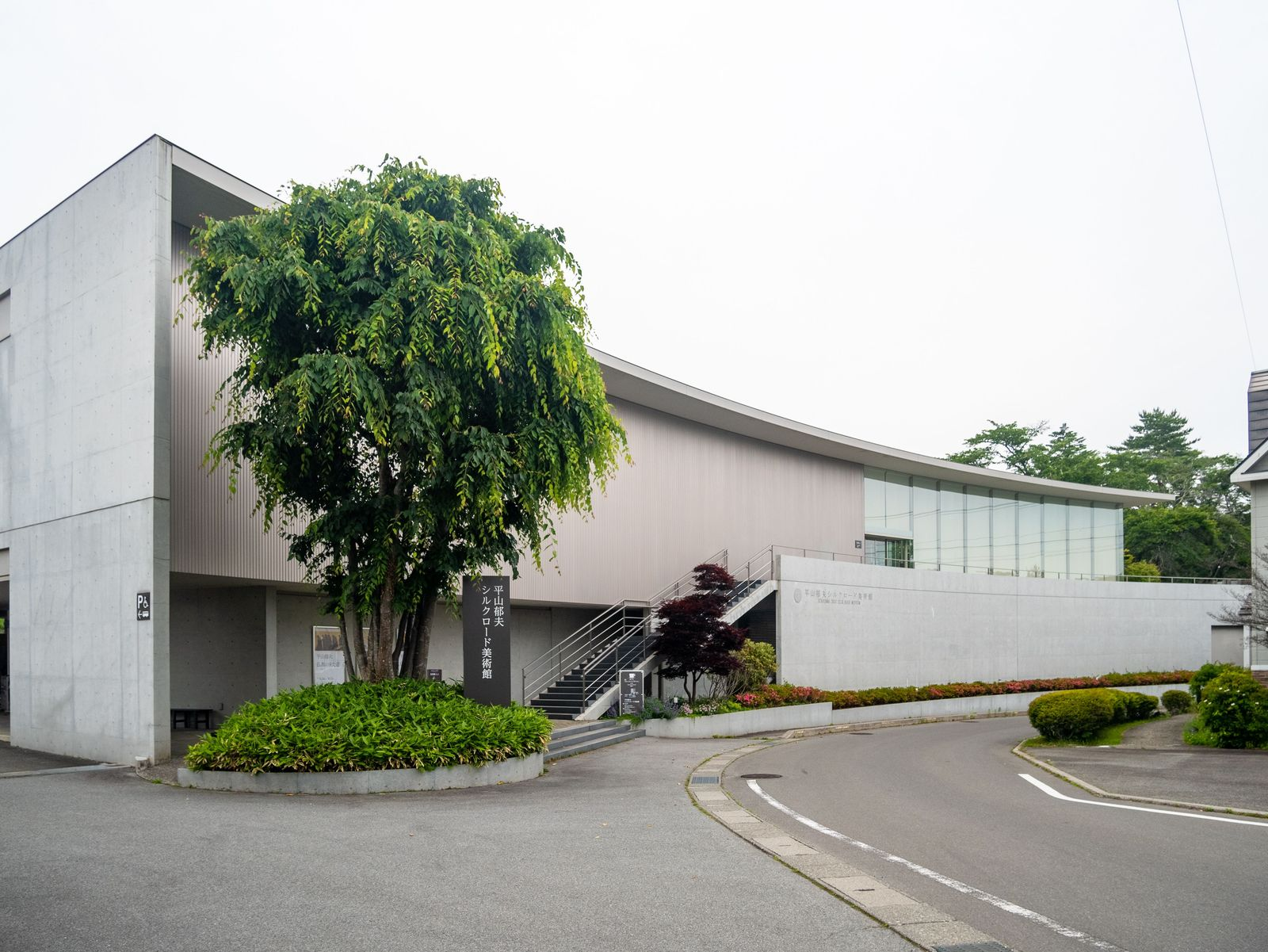
- Hirayama Ikuo Silk Road Museum

- Location within Japan
- Location: Hokuto, Yamanashi Prefecture, Japan
- Coordinates: 35.879116°N 138.359384°E
- Type: Archaeology museum
- Website: https://www.silkroad-museum.jp/english/

The Hirayama Ikuo Silk Road Museum is a museum named after the painter and collector Ikuo Hirayama located in Hokuto, Yamanashi Prefecture of Japan.

The museum opened in 2004. It is one of the few and significant museums about the Silk Road to be located outside of China.

Many of the objects of the collection were exhibited in China in 2018–2019.

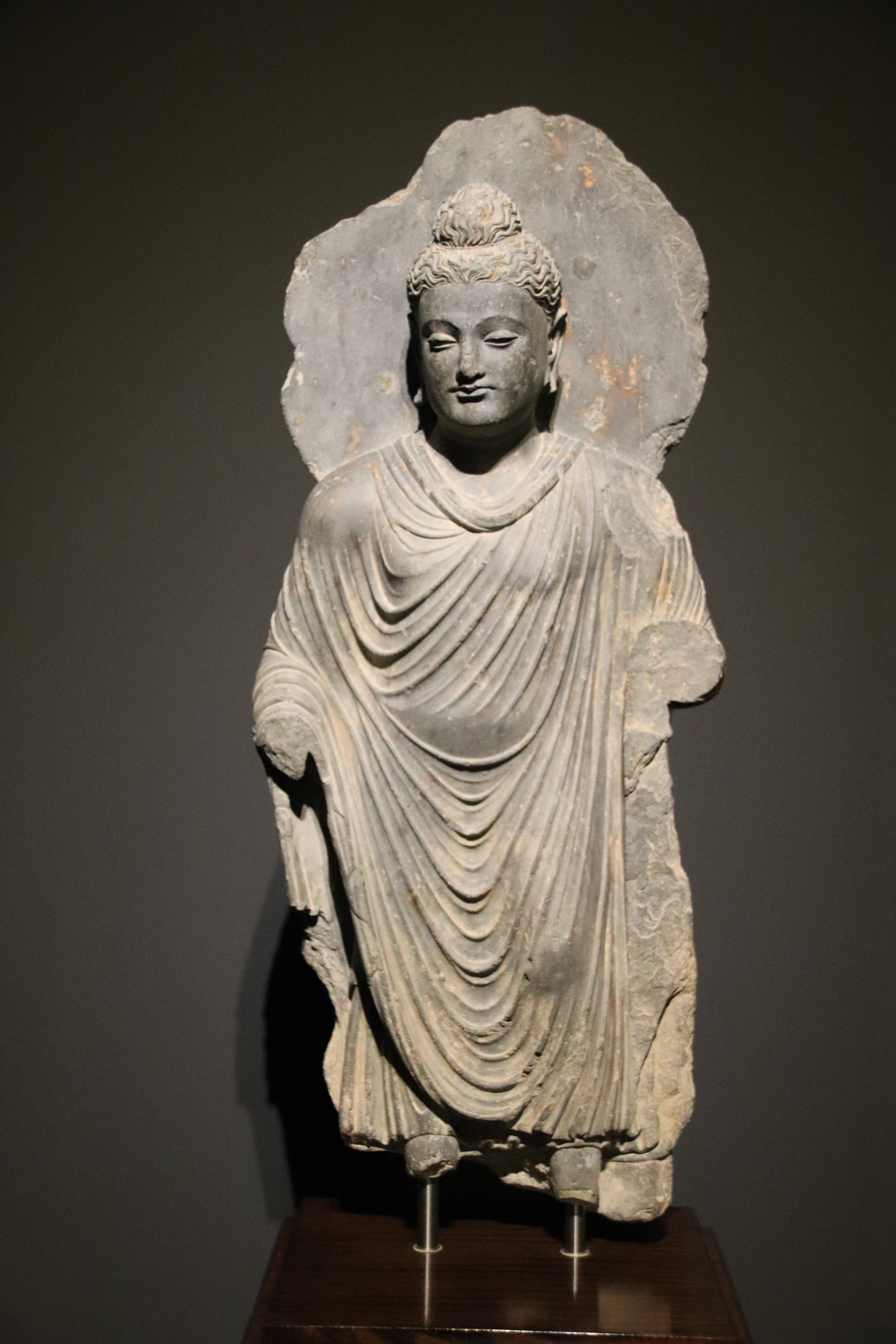
Gandhara Buddha

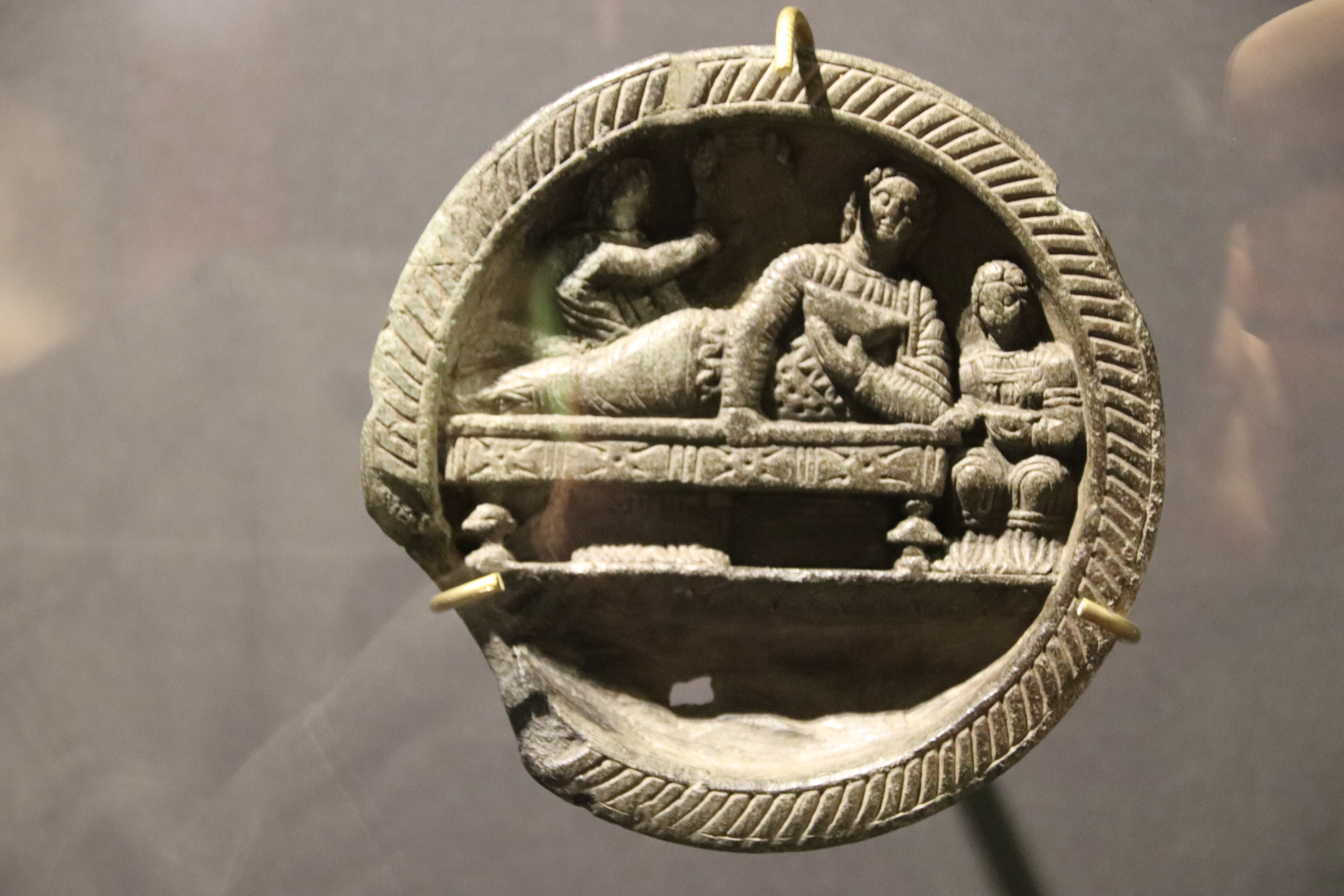
Stone palette

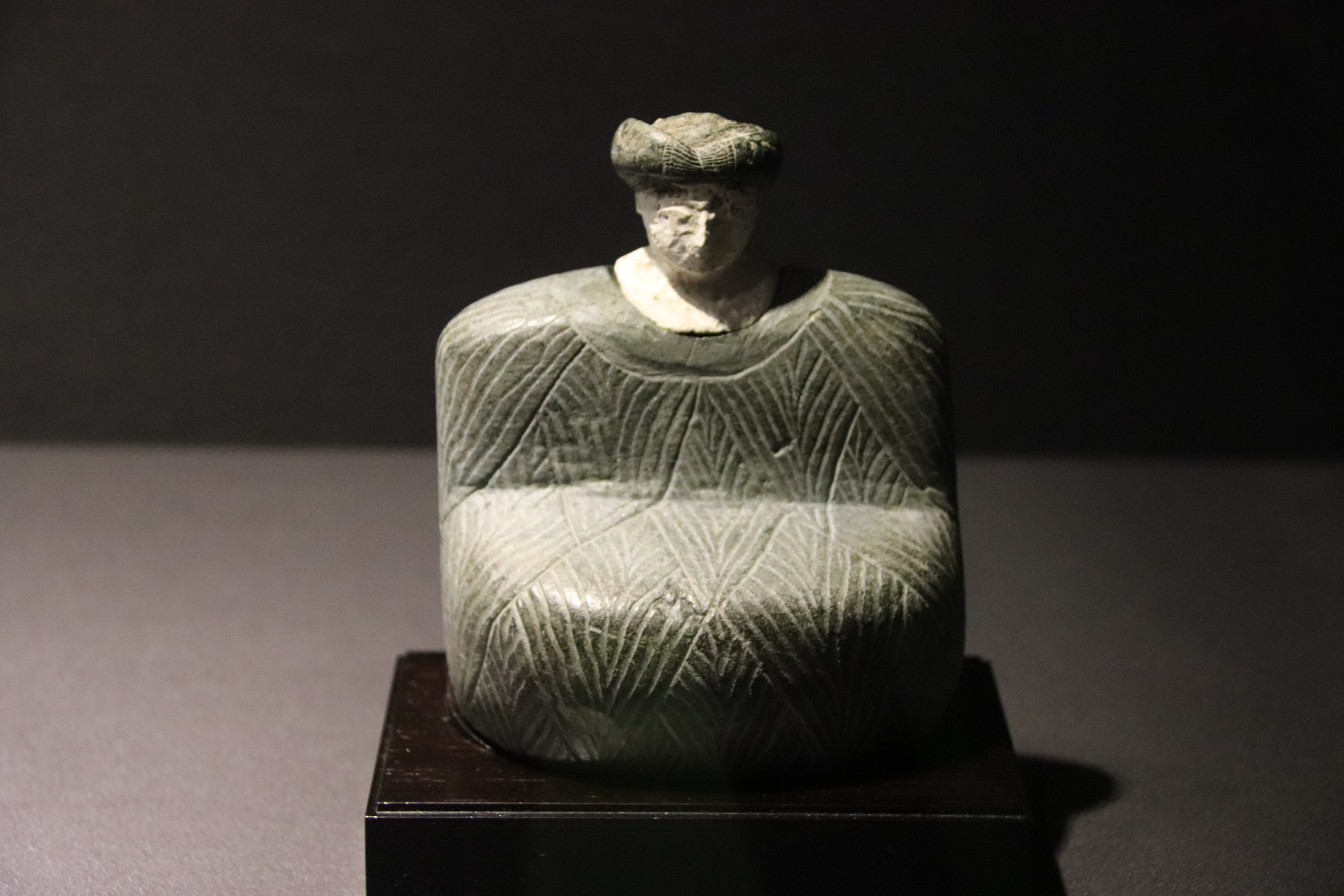
Bactrian statuette

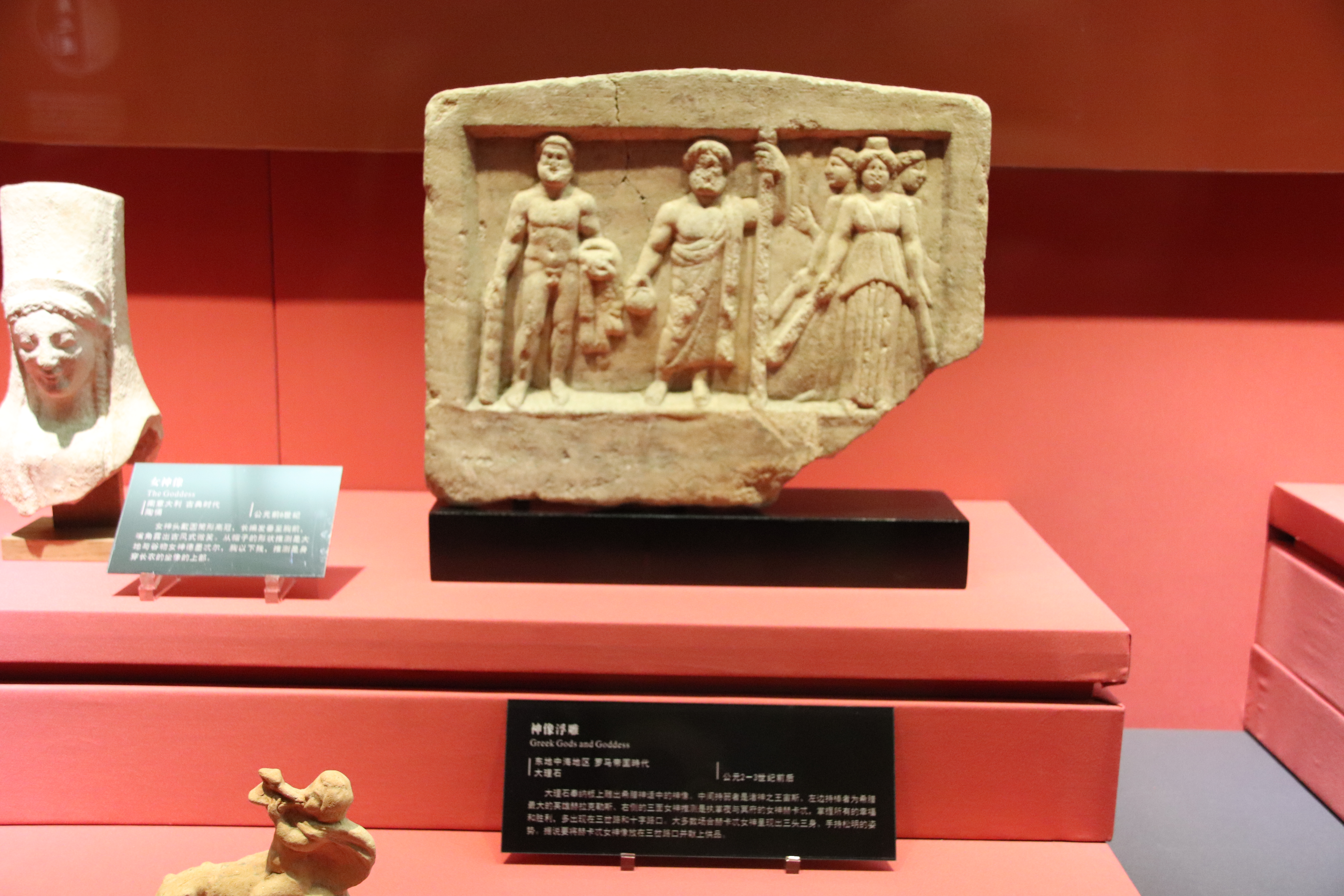
Greek gods

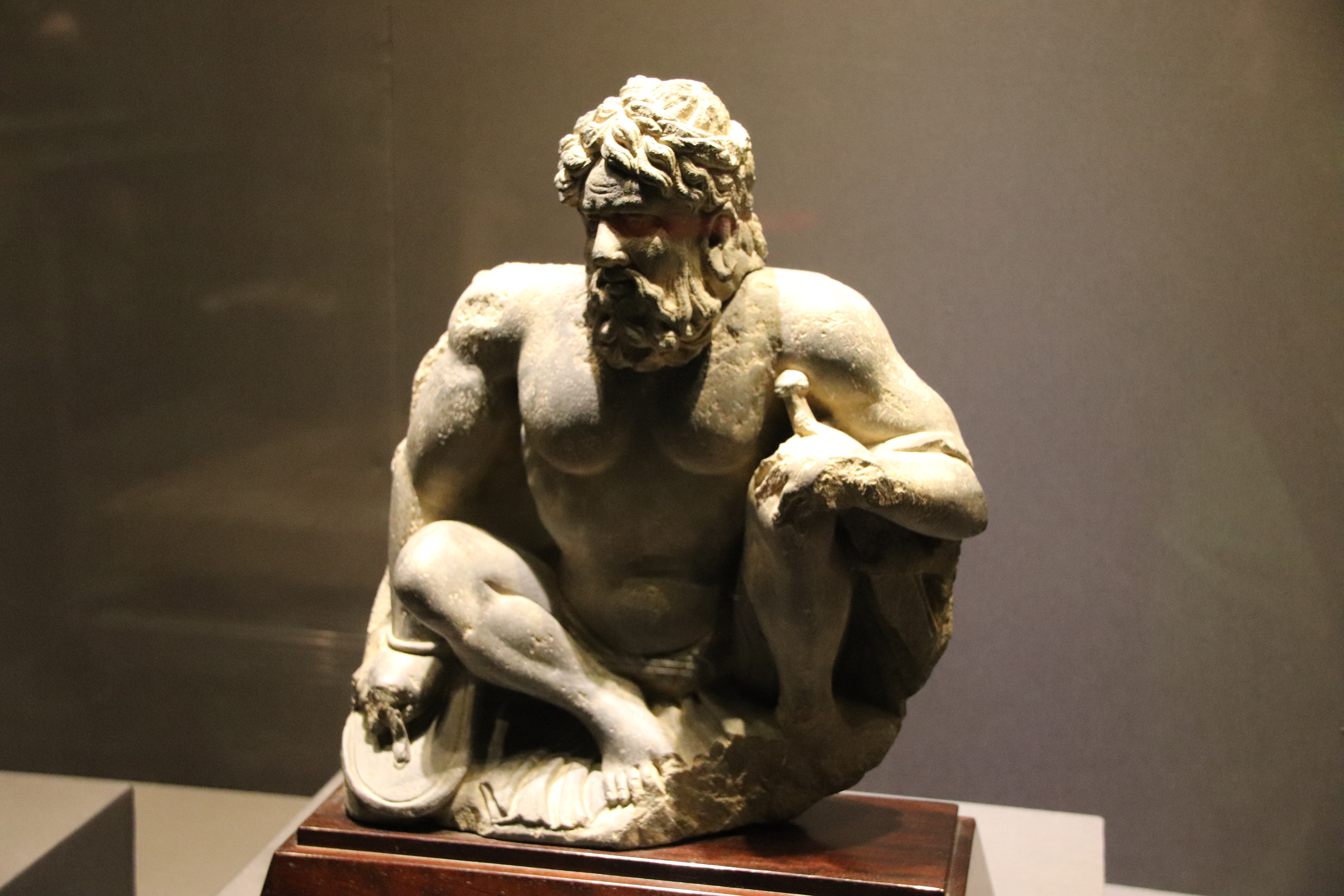
Gandhara Atlas, 2nd-3rd cent. CE

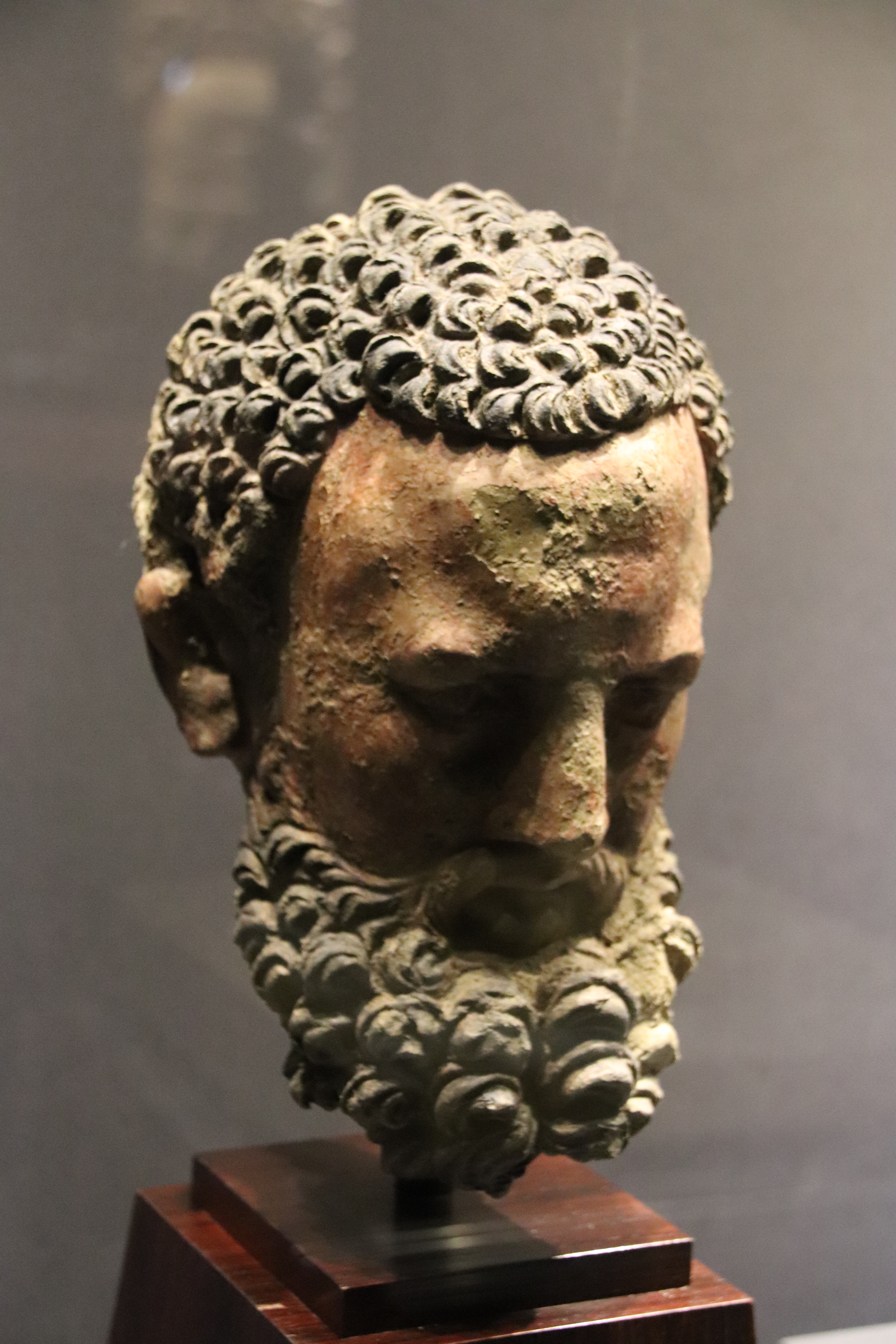
Vajrapani, Gandhara, 3rd-4th cent. CE

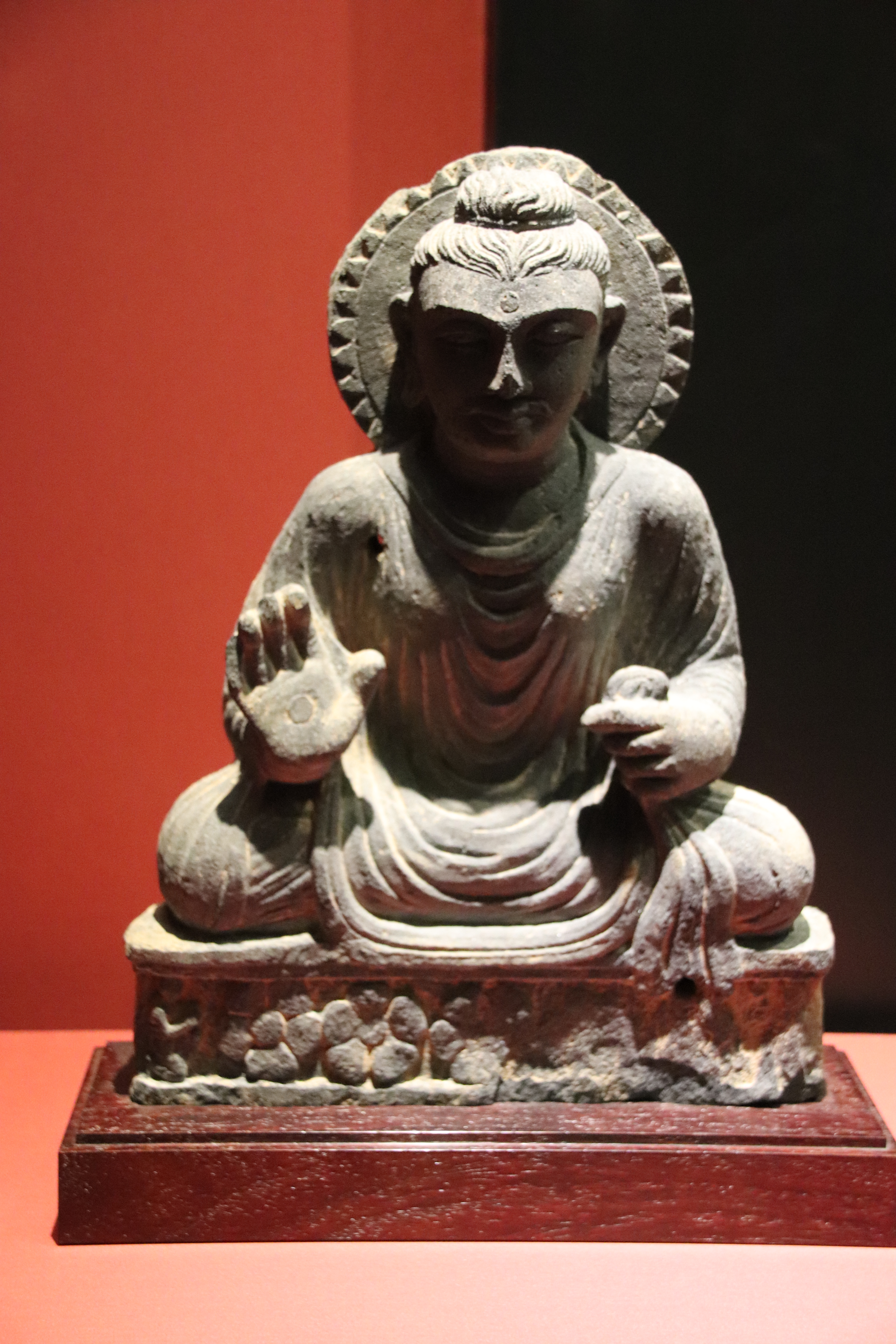
Buddha, 2nd-3rd cent. CE

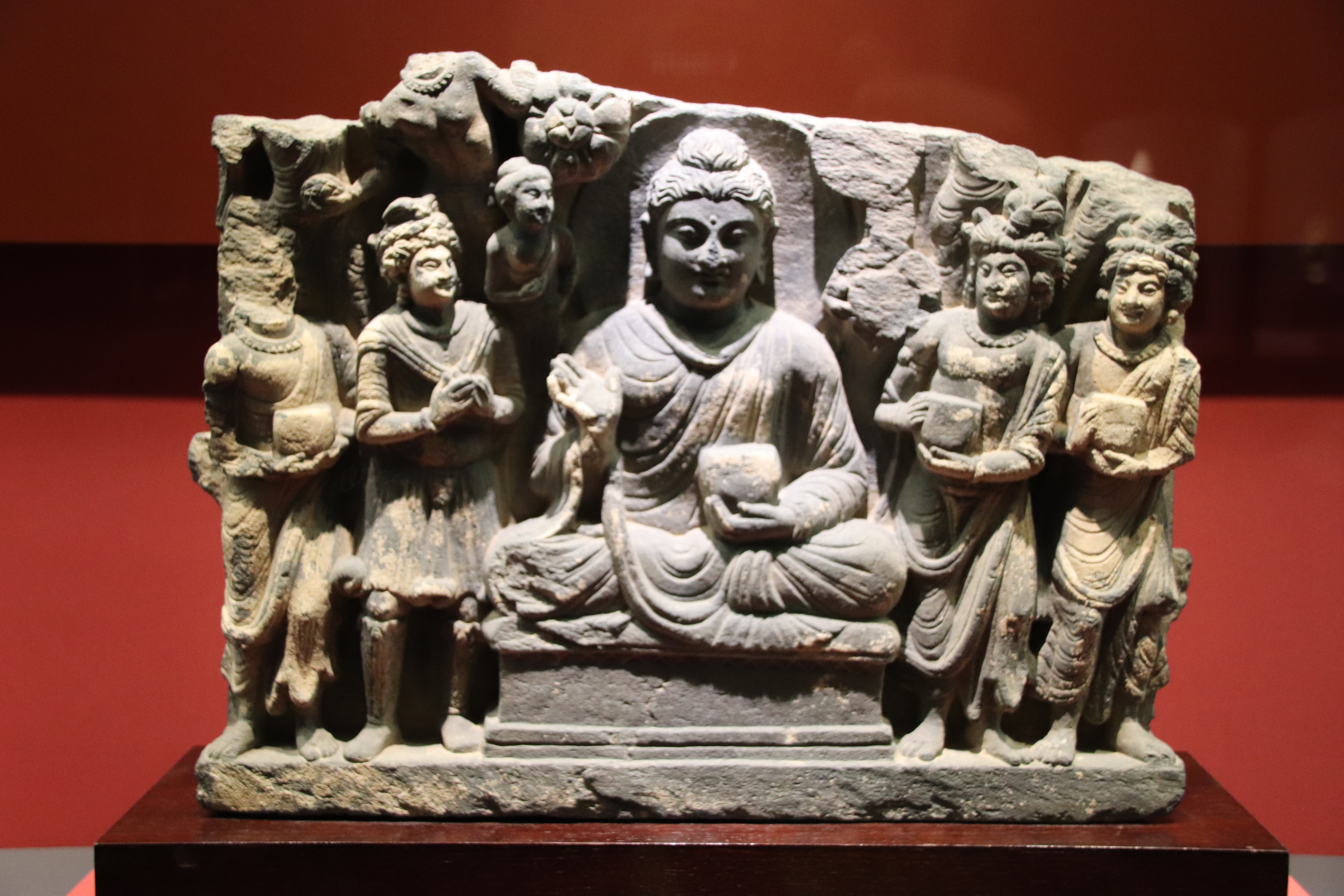
The Buddha and Heavenly kings, 2nd-3rd cent. CE

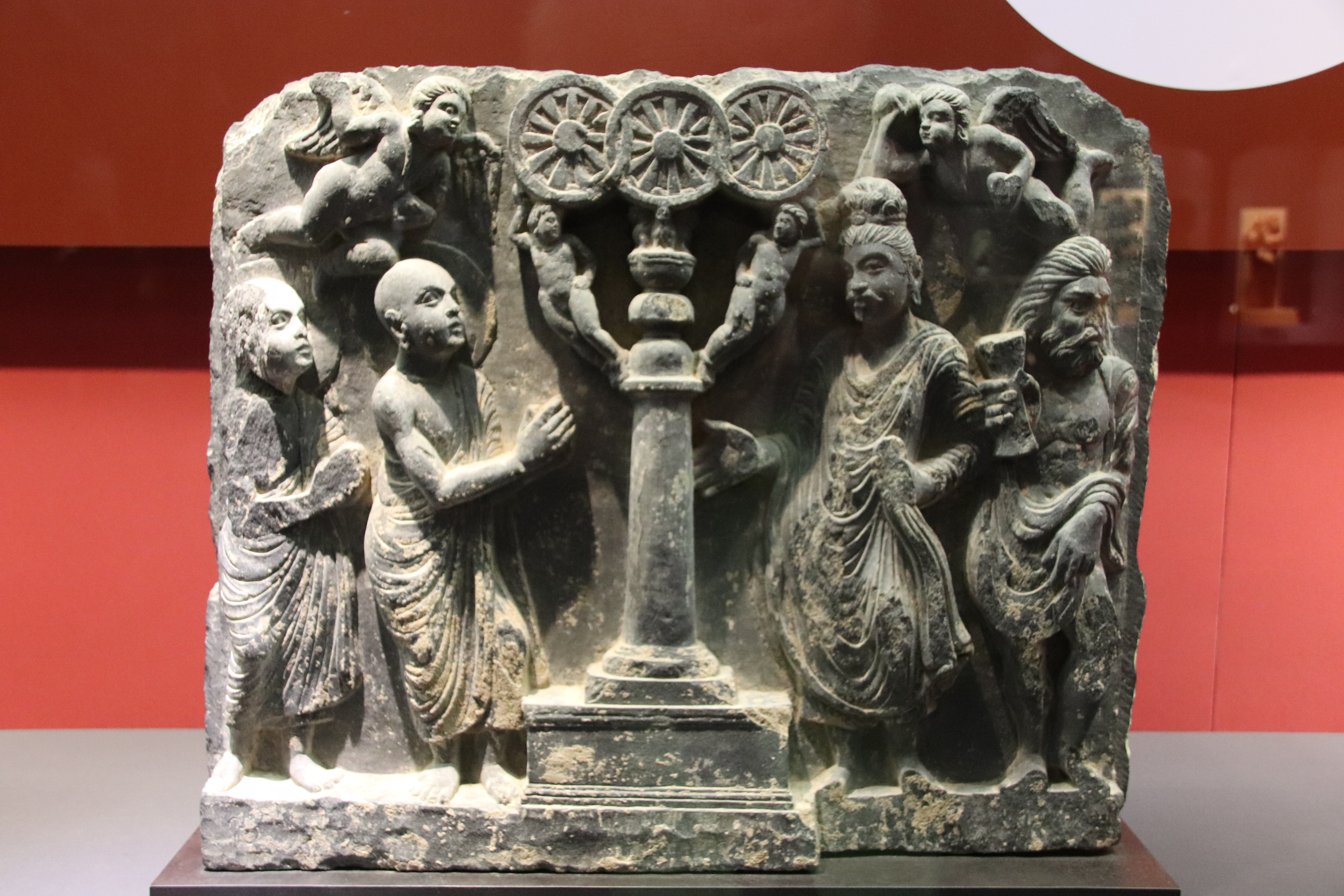
The Buddha's First Sermon, 2nd-3rd cent. CE
