= 2003 in Japanese television =

Events in 2003 in Japanese television.

== Events ==
- December 1 - Digital terrestrial broadcasting begins in the Tokyo, Nagoya and Osaka metropolitan areas using the ISDB-T standard.

== Debuts ==
Show	Station	Premiere Date	Genre	Original Run
Ai Yori Aoshi: Enishi	TVS	October 12th	anime	October 12, 2003 – December 28, 2003
Air Master	Nippon TV	April 1st	anime	April 1, 2003 – September 30, 2003
Bakuryū Sentai Abaranger	TV Asahi	February 16th	tokusatsu	February 16, 2003 - February 8, 2004
Bakuten Shoot Beyblade G-Revolution	TV Tokyo	January 6th	anime	January 6, 2003 – December 29, 2003
Boku no Ikiru Michi	Fuji TV	January 7th	drama	January 7, 2003 – March 18, 2003
Chouseishin Gransazer	TV Tokyo	October 4th	tokusatsu	October 4, 2003 – September 25, 2004
Da Capo	tvk	July 11th	anime	July 11, 2003 – December 27, 2003
Di Gi Charat Nyo	TV Tokyo	April 6th	anime	April 6, 2003 – March 28, 2004
Eurasia	NHK	April 20th	documentary	April 20, 2003 – December 14, 2003
Fullmetal Alchemist	MBS	October 4th	anime	October 4, 2003 – October 2, 2004
Good Luck!!	TBS	January 19th	drama	January 19, 2003 – March 23, 2003
Kamen Rider 555	TV Asahi	January 26th	tokusatsu	January 26, 2003 – January 18, 2004
Kimi ga Nozomu Eien	Chiba TV	October 5th	anime	October 5, 2003 - January 4, 2004
Konjiki no Gash Bell!!	Fuji TV	April 6th	anime	April 6, 2003 – March 26, 2006
Maburaho	WOWOW	October 14th	anime	October 14, 2003 – April 6, 2004
Mermaid Melody Pichi Pichi Pitch	TV Tokyo	April 5th	anime	April 5, 2003 – March 27, 2004
Papuwa	TV Tokyo	September 30th	anime	September 30, 2003 – March 30, 2004
Please Twins!	WOWOW	July 15th	anime	July 15, 2003 – October 14, 2003
Pretty Guardian Sailor Moon	CBC	October 4th	tokusatsu	October 4, 2003 – September 25, 2004
Rockman EXE Axess	TV Tokyo	October 4th	anime	October 4, 2003 – September 25, 2004
Saiyuki RELOAD	TV Tokyo	October 2nd	anime	October 2, 2003 – March 25, 2004
Sonic X	TV Tokyo	April 6th	anime	April 6, 2003 - March 28, 2004
Super Lifeform Transformers: Micron Legend	TV Tokyo	January 10th	anime	January 10, 2003 – December 26, 2003
The World of Narue	MBS	April 5th	anime	April 5, 2003 – June 21, 2003
Tokumei Kakarichō Tadano Hitoshi	TV Asahi	July 4th	drama	July 4, 2003 - September 19, 2003
Water Boys	Fuji TV	July 1st	drama	July 1, 2003 – September 9, 2003

== Ongoing shows ==
- Music Fair, music (1964-present)
- Mito Kōmon, jidaigeki (1969-2011)
- Sazae-san, anime (1969-present)
- FNS Music Festival, music (1974-present)
- Panel Quiz Attack 25, game show (1975-present)
- Doraemon, anime (1979-2005)
- Soreike! Anpanman. anime (1988-present)
- Downtown no Gaki no Tsukai ya Arahende!!, game show (1989-present)
- Crayon Shin-chan, anime (1992-present)
- Shima Shima Tora no Shimajirō, anime (1993-2008)
- Nintama Rantarō, anime (1993-present)
- Chibi Maruko-chan, anime (1995-present)
- Kochira Katsushika-ku Kameari Kōen-mae Hashutsujo, anime (1996-2004)
- Detective Conan, anime (1996-present)
- SASUKE, sports (1997-present)
- Ojarumaru, anime (1998-present)
- One Piece, anime (1999–present)
- Yu-Gi-Oh! Duel Monsters, anime (2000-2004)
- Tottoko Hamtaro, anime (2000-2004)
- InuYasha, anime (2000-2004)
- The Prince of Tennis, anime (2001-2005)
- Kitty's Paradise Fresh, children's variety (2002-2005)
- Pocket Monsters Advanced Generation, anime (2002-2006)
- Naruto, anime (2002–2007)

== Endings ==
Show	Station	Ending Date	Genre	Original Run
Bakuten Shoot Beyblade G-Revolution	TV Tokyo	December 29th	anime	January 6, 2003 – December 29, 2003
Boku no Ikiru Michi	Fuji TV	March 18th	drama	January 7, 2003 – March 18, 2003
Bomberman Jetters	TV Tokyo	September 24th	anime	October 2, 2002 – September 24, 2003
Da Capo	UHF Stations	December 27th	anime	July 11, 2003 – December 27, 2003
Digimon Frontier	Fuji TV	March 30th	anime	April 7, 2002 - March 30, 2003
Dragon Drive	TV Tokyo	March 27th	anime	July 4, 2002 – March 27, 2003
Full Moon o Sagashite	Fuji TV	March 29th	anime	April 6, 2002 - March 29, 2003
Good Luck!!	TBS	March 23rd	drama	January 19, 2003 - March 23, 2003
Hikaru no Go	TV Tokyo	March 26th	anime	October 10, 2001 – March 26, 2003
Kirby of the Stars	CBC	September 27th	anime	October 6, 2001 - September 27, 2003
Mobile Suit Gundam SEED	MBS	September 27th	anime	October 5, 2002 – September 27, 2003
Ninpuu Sentai Hurricaneger	TV Asahi	February 9th	tokusatsu	February 17, 2002 – February 9, 2003
Ojamajo Doremi Dokkan!	TV Asahi	February 3rd	anime	February 3, 2002 – January 26, 2003
Please Twins!	WOWOW	October 14th	anime	July 15, 2003 – October 14, 2003
Rockman.EXE	TV Tokyo	March 31st	anime	March 4, 2002 – March 31, 2003
Super Lifeform Transformers: Micron Legend	TV Tokyo	December 26th	anime	January 10, 2003 – December 26, 2003
The World of Narue	MBS	June 21st	anime	April 5, 2003 – June 21, 2003
Tokumei Kakarichō Tadano Hitoshi	TV Asahi	September 19th	drama	July 4, 2003 - September 19, 2003
Tokyo Mew Mew	TV Tokyo	April 6th	anime	April 6, 2002 – March 29, 2003
Tsuribaka Nisshi	TV Asahi	September 13th	anime	November 2, 2002 - September 13, 2003
Ojamajo Doremi Dokk~an!	TV Asahi	January 26th	anime	February 3, 2002 – January 26, 2003
Piano	Kids Station	January 13th	anime	November 11, 2002 – January 13, 2003
Water Boys	Fuji TV	July 1st	drama	July 1, 2003 – September 9, 2003
Weiß Kreuz Glühen	Kids Station	February 20th	anime	November 28, 2002 – February 20, 2003

== See also ==
- 2003 in anime
- List of Japanese television dramas
- 2003 in Japan
- List of Japanese films of 2003
