= Fair Trade Commission (Japan) =

Competition regulator of Japanese government

- 公正取引委員会; Kōsei Torihiki Iinkai

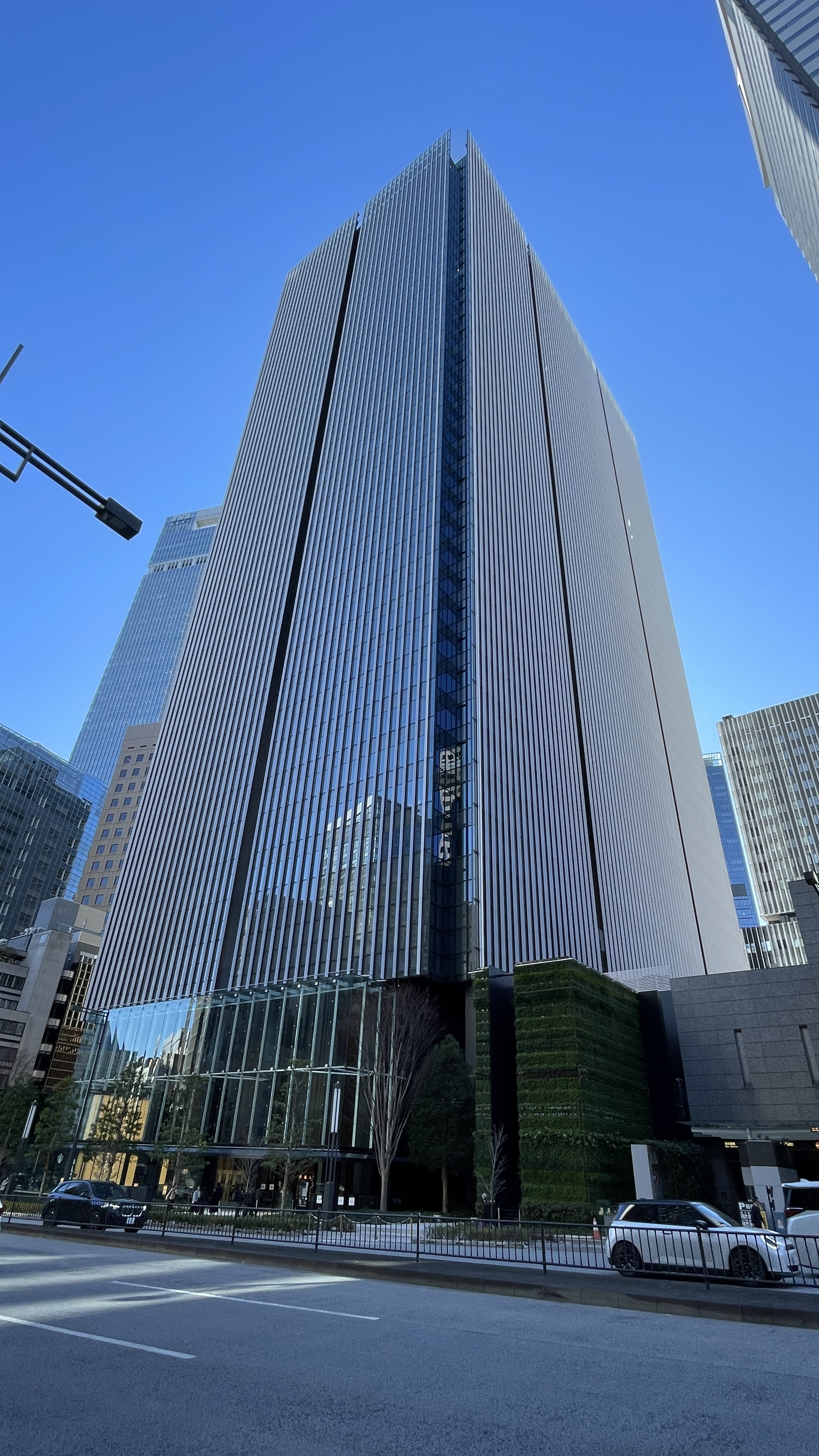
- Office building of Japanese Fair Trade Commission

Commission overview
- Formed: July 1, 1947
- Jurisdiction: Japan
- Headquarters: 2-2-3 Toranomon, Minato-ku, Tokyo, Japan
- Employees: 957
- Annual budget: ¥15,845,000,000 JPY (FY2025)
- Commission executive: Eiji Chatani, Chairman
- Parent Commission: Cabinet Office
- Website: Fair Trade Commission (Japan) (in English)

The Fair Trade Commission (公正取引委員会, Kōsei Torihiki Iinkai; FTC) is an independent statutory agency which enforces anti-competition law in Japan. The commission was originally created to enforce provisions of the Antimonopoly Act in 1947, but its regulatory scope has grown to include the Subcontract Act and Freelancer Act as well.

The commission pursues enforcement through a variety of means, including civil cases and voluntary changes by companies. The commission shares jurisdiction with the Japan Public Prosecutor’s Office for enforcement, with the commission handling civil affairs and referring criminal cases to the Prosecutor’s office. Much of the commission's work focuses on mergers and acquisitions, as well as anti-cartel enforcement.

The JFTC is composed of four commissioners and a chairman. The chair and commissioners are nominated by the prime minister of Japan and confirmed by the Japan Diet for a period of five years. The chair is required to resign at the age of 70. Day-to-day work is done by the General Secretariat's office, led by the Secretary General.

== History ==
=== Beginnings (1947–1970s) ===
The Japan Fair Trade Commission (JFTC) was established as a part of the Antimonopoly Act by a post-war Japanese government at the behest of the Supreme Command Allied Powers in 1947. The JFTC, under Section VIII of the act, was empowered to enforce regulations related to private monopolization, unreasonable restraint of trade, unfair trade practices, monopolistic situations, and international company administrative affairs.

Although modeled after United States antitrust laws, the Antimonopoly Act in its original form was seen as too restrictive and rigid by Japanese businessmen. Many early JFTC actions were focused on cartels, known in Japan as zaibatsu, which owned 22.9% of total assets of Japanese stock market companies in 1945. As a result, subsequent revisions to the act in 1949 and 1953 reduced in scope what detractors saw as “non-Japanese” provisions, such as restrictions on horizontal and vertical growth, as well as cartel activities.

The JFTC was also tasked with enforcing the Subcontract Act when passed in 1956. The act was created to ensure that subcontractors would be paid in a timely manner by parent contractors. In addition, the act included clauses requiring protections, such as fair pricing and forced purchases, between parent contractors and subcontractors.

The JFTC would continue to be weakened in its ability to enforce anti-trust law through 1974, in what one journalist called a “history of humiliation.” Factors such as Japanese culture, history, worker immobility, lack of accountability, and overreach from the Ministry of International Trade and Industry (MITI) led to a lack of enforcement and action. This led to major price-fixing scandals in the 1960s and 1970s, including Japanese companies in manufacturing, chemicals, automobiles, and shipbuilding. Japan’s economy also flourished during this time, with gross domestic product rising from $47.42 billion in 1960 to $490.04 billion in 1974.

The last straw for the Japan Diet came from oil and trade companies during 1973. Price-fixing became so bad that basic necessities, like detergent and toilet paper, disappeared from stores due to intentionally withheld inventory. Oil companies collaborated to increase prices through the Petroleum Association of Japan. A subsequent action by the JFTC led to several recommendations breaking up the cartels and criminal referrals to the Prosecutor General. Executives indicted in the action were given suspended sentences of between four and ten months in prison, as well as fines ranging from 1.5 million to 2.5 million yen (roughly 3.4 million to 5.7 million yen in 2024).

=== Reforms (1970s–1990s) ===
The need for more anti-trust enforcement strengthened the case for reform. In 1977, the Antimonopoly Act was amended to give more enforcement power to the JFTC. Changes included the ability for an entrepreneur to break up a business if monopolistic conditions existed, the requirement for surcharges on illegal cartels, reporting requirements, and the partial elimination of zaibatsu by restricting the ability of large corporations to hold the stock of other corporations. These changes were pushed for by then-chair Toshihide Takahashi, who wanted to push the message to Japanese and international businesses that the JFTC was to be feared.

Still, the United States government and associated interests did not believe that the enacted reforms were enough. Even after the 1977 changes, zaibatsu were still alive and well in Japan due to the pro-cartel environment. Subsequent changes to the Antimonopoly Act once again carved out exemptions for zaibatsu at the behest of the MITI.

Trade issues with the United States in the 1980s and the threat of Western sanctions led to yet another overhaul of the Antimonopoly Act. Under a push for greater transparency, the Advisory Group on Distribution Systems, Business Practices, and Competition Policy met in nineteen different sessions to study and report on Japanese business practices and its distribution system. The group’s final report, issued in 1990, noted that given the improvements in productivity and efficiency in the Japanese economy, it was also time for improvements to the “quality of life” of consumers.

Based on this report, the JFTC issued new guidelines in 1991 on whether certain corporate trade actions violated the Antimonopoly Act. These guidelines provided new mechanisms for the JFTC to crack down on unfair trade practices by allowing criminal actions and surcharges to be brought against Japanese companies engaging in unlawful boycotts. Although criticized by scholars and journalists as weak, several barriers to entering the Japanese market were reduced, to the benefit of American companies.

=== "Lost Decade" and technology regulation (1990s–present) ===
By the early 2000s, the JFTC’s enforcement ability was once again heavily criticized. An analysis by the International Monetary Fund in 2003 concluded that in addition to several other monetary policy changes, stronger anti-trust enforcement was needed to help Japan out of its then-economic stagnation. During the Lost Decade period, the JFTC approved “depression cartels,” exemptions for companies from the AMA in an attempt to bolster Japan’s economy. Subsequent analysis found that these actions had the exact opposite effect and exacerbated Japan’s financial crisis. The ability to grant these exemptions was reduced under amendments to the Antimonopoly Act in 1997, 1999, and 2000.

In more recent times, the JFTC has taken a critical eye to technology companies. In 2004, the JFTC raided Microsoft Japan’s headquarters to investigate whether the company had abused its dominant position in the market. According to the allegations from the JFTC, Microsoft Japan had inserted provisions into contracts with Japanese computer manufacturers preventing them from suing for patent violations, constituting an unfair trade practice. The case was resolved in 2008, when the JFTC issued a cease and desist, requiring Microsoft Japan to not enforce the clause in any of its existing contracts.

Other actions against technology companies since 2013 include actions against Amazon, Apple, Rakuten, Expedia, Airbnb, and Booking.com. In 2025, the JFTC issued new guidelines that would require Apple and Google to not give preferential treatment to their own smartphone services.

In March 2023, the JFTC fined Chugoku Electric Power Co., Chubu Electric Power Co., and Kyushu Electric Power Co. a record 101 billion yen for forming a cartel. Kansai Electric Power Co. was not fined for revealing its existence.

The JFTC moved its headquarters from Chiyoda City to Minato City in stages between December 2025 and February 2026 as part of an governmental effort to address administrative office space shortages in Tokyo.

== Enforcement powers and philosophy ==
The Antimonopoly Act enables the Japan Fair Trade Commission to regulate and prosecute:

- "Unreasonable restraint of trade", such as rigging bid processes and creating cartels.
- Business mergers, which must be cleared by the JFTC.
- "Private monopolisation and unfair trade practices", such as predatory pricing and market exclusion.
- "Abuse of superior bargaining position," which is also regulated by the Subcontract Act and the Freelance Act.

The Antimonopoly Act empowers the Japan Fair Trade Commission to issue criminal and civil penalties for violations of these areas, including fines and jail time. Criminal penalties are, however, rare - there have only been about 30 cases since the JFTC's founding.

Much of the JFTC's activity focuses on merger and acquisition activity. The JFTC reviews around 300 transactions every year, including foreign transactions that could have an impact on the Japanese consumer market. Recent focuses for the JFTC have included digital marketplaces and "killer acquisitions," or companies acquiring smaller companies which could become strong competitors.

The JFTC has difficulty enforcing abuse of superior bargaining position cases due to Antimonopoly Act rules. Once a case is submitted for judicial review if challenged, there is no way for the commission to adjust the fine amount. In 2018, the JFTC started to use a more informal resolution process to get around this barrier called a "commitment procedure". This method has companies voluntarily fix problems in exchange for the JFTC ignoring any related law violations.

Anti-cartel enforcement has been driven by a leniency program introduced in January 2006. Under the program, companies who self-report that they are part of a cartel and provide details can see a reduction in their eventual anti-trust penalty. The program was amended in 2020 to allow for the JFTC to have more flexibility in determining penalty reductions and to remove limits on the amount of companies that can self-report.

Recently, experts have noted a shift in the JFTC's philosophy to advocacy over penalizing. These activities include writing reports and conducting fact-finding surveys meant to convey the JFTC's position on competition in a certain market. Terushia Ishii, Yoshihiro Sakano, and Hiroaki Matsunaga of City-Yuwa Partners wrote in the Global Competition Review that "By nature, these proposals for improvements are not legally enforceable, but there are some companies that claim that the JFTC has been very vocal in urging them to improve." This has led to a priority of voluntary changes from private companies.

== Structure and members ==
=== Current members of the FTC ===
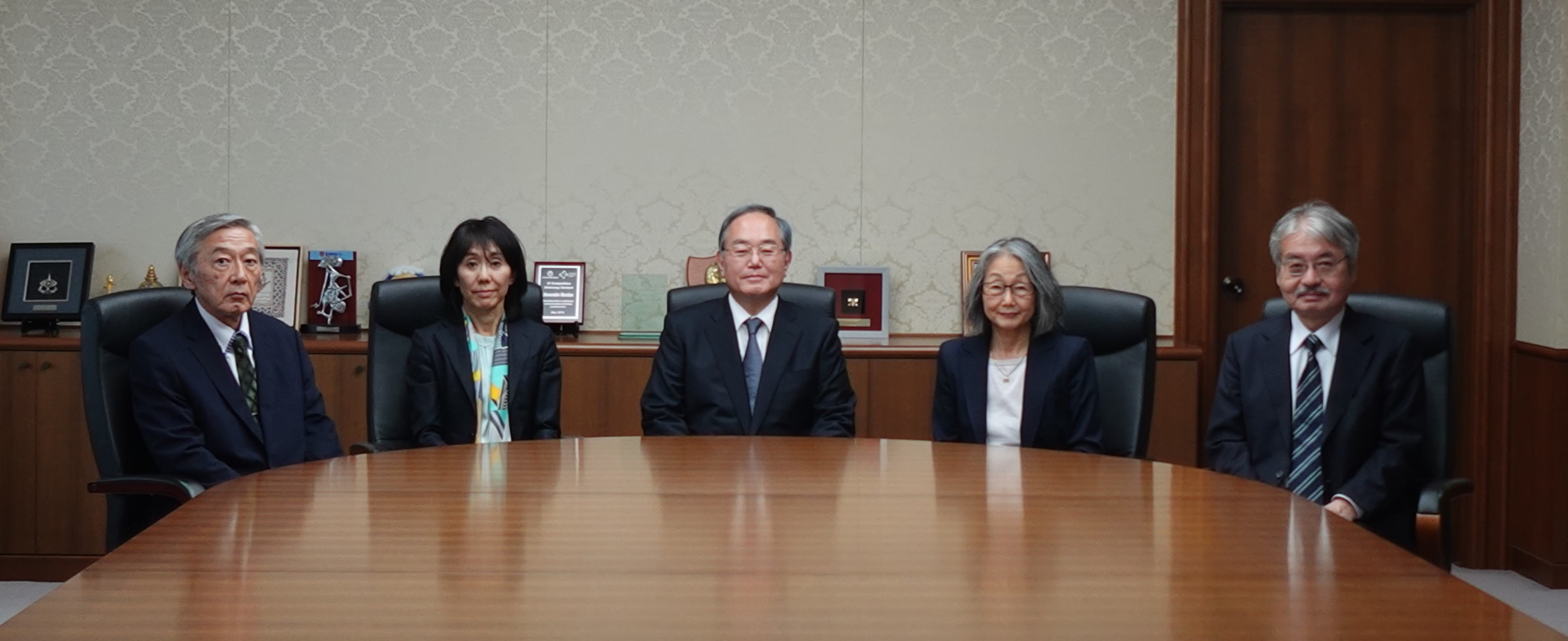
Current members of the Japan Fair Trade Commission. From left to right: Yasushi Yoshida, Akiko Mimura, Eiji Chatani, Reiko Aoki, and Fumio Sensui.

	Name	Term began
Chair	Eiji Chatani	May 21, 2025
Commissioner	Akiko Mimura	February 26, 2016
Commissioner	Reiko Aoki	November 21, 2016
Commissioner	Yasushi Yoshida	July 1, 2022
Commissioner	Fumio Sensui	April 13, 2023

The current Secretary General is Tetsuya Fujimoto. The General Secretariat's office is divided into four sections:

- Secretariat, which handles administrative affairs. The current Senior Deputy Secretary General, which runs the Secretariat, is Nobuaki Fujii.
- Economic Affairs Bureau, which helps to plan competition policy and reviews mergers for economic impact. The current Director General is Hiroo Iwanari.
- Investigation Bureau, which investigates violations of the Antimonopoly Act and associated laws. The current Director General is Masaru Ogo.
- Regional offices, which support the JFTC's efforts at a local level.

== See also ==
- Competition law
- Competition policy
- Consumer protection
