= Banff World Media Festival =

International media event in Canada

- Frequency: Annual
- Locations: Banff, Alberta, Canada.
- Inaugurated: 1979 as the Banff World Television Festival
- Organiser: Brunico Communications
- Website: https://banffmediafestival.playbackonline.ca/

The Banff World Media Festival (formerly known as the Banff World Television Festival) is an international media event held in the Canadian Rockies at the Fairmont Banff Springs Hotel in Banff, Alberta, Canada. Founded in 1979, the festival is concerned with world television and digital content and its creation and development, and is owned and operated by Brunico Communications.

In addition to the awards given to international television programmes, the festival also offers seminars, master classes, and pitching opportunities to television professionals. Film directors, screenwriters, and producers from PBS, BBC, NHK, Arte, Channel 4, ABC, Sony Pictures, HBO, CBC, NFB, SBS, and many other broadcasters and production companies attend the annual event.

== The Rockie Awards ==
The festival features an international program competition, the Banff Rockie Awards. Past winners include PBS for The Hobart Shakespeareans and No Direction Home: Bob Dylan, ICP for Aaron Cohen's Debt, BBC and HBO for The Children of Beslan, NHK for Children Full of Life, BBC and WGBH for Bleak House, and Arte for Fellini: I'm a Born Liar.

The awards ceremony also bestows the Sir Peter Ustinov Comedy Award. Past recipients of the award include John Cleese, Dame Edna, Bob Newhart, Martin Short, Tracey Ullman, Kelsey Grammer, Ricky Gervais, Craig Ferguson, Shane Smith, Brent Butt, and Suroosh Alvi. Jan Randall was music director and Composer for the awards from 1995 to 2007.

=== The Rockies Program Competition ===
The Rockie Awards is Banff's program celebrating television and digital content from around the world. Television and digital programs are considered for a Rockie Award, presented at a ceremony each year at Banff. With participation from more than 40 countries annually, including an industry jury of more than 350 professionals working in entertainment and media around the world, the Rockie Awards is one of the world's largest program competitions of its kind.

=== The Rockies Special Achievement Awards ===
Each year, prolific members of the media and entertainment industry are recognized for their accomplishments in the past year via the Special Achievement Awards, given out at the Rockie Awards Gala. These are given out at the discretion of the Banff Foundation Board.

== See also ==
- Festivals in Alberta
- List of television festivals
