= Shunji Kōno =

Japanese politician (born 1964)

- 河野 俊嗣
- Kōno in 2024

Governor of Miyazaki Prefecture
- Incumbent
- Assumed office 21 January 2011
- Monarchs: Akihito; Naruhito
- Preceded by: Hideo Higashikokubaru

Personal details
- Born: 8 September 1964 (age 62) Kure, Hiroshima, Japan
- Party: Independent
- Education: University of Tokyo

Shunji Kōno (河野 俊嗣, Kōno Shunji; born 8 September 1964) is a Japanese politician and the governor of Miyazaki Prefecture in Japan. In 2014, he was re-elected for a second term as the Miyazaki governor.

== Biography ==
Kōno was born on 8 September 1964 in Kure, Hiroshima.
