= Subcontract Act =

Japanese Statute dealing with subcontractors

The Subcontract Act (officially Act against Delay in Payment of Subcontract Proceeds, etc. to Subcontractors, Japanese: 下請代金支払遅延等防止法) is a Japanese statute enacted in 1956 (Act No. 120, June 1, 1956). The act complements the country's Antimonopoly Act and is enforced by the Japan Fair Trade Commission. It can be regarded as a more detailed elaboration of the Antimonopoly Act's prohibition on abuse of a superior bargaining position.

== Background and purpose ==
Subcontracting is a widespread practice in many Japanese industries and the Japanese legislature recognised the need to protect subcontractors from powerful counterparts at an early stage in Japan's post-war recovery, leading to the adoption of the Act in 1956. According to the act itself, its purpose is to ensure fairness in transactions between subcontractors and their counterparts (the companies procuring the services from the subcontractor) and to protect the interests of subcontractors (Article 1). This, in turn, is expected to contribute to the sound development of Japan’s national economy (Article 1, in fine).

== Key obligations and provisions ==
Some of the main obligations and legal requirements under the Act include:

- The prime contractor must fix the date of payment of subcontract proceeds within 60 days after receipt of work from the subcontractor (or service provision), or as short as possible (Article 2-2).
- The prime contractor must deliver a written document to the subcontractor specifying certain details of the contract: nature of the work, amount of subcontract proceeds, payment date and method, and other matters required under JFTC rules (Article 3).

== Amendments and recent developments ==
After a panel of experts proposed modifications to invigorate the Subcontract Act, a major bill to amend the Subcontract Act was passed in May 2025 and is to take effect on January 1, 2026. Key changes include:

1. Prohibition of payment by promissory notes, etc., especially where the full amount cannot be obtained by the due date.
2. Prohibition of unilateral determination of payment amounts without proper negotiation, or failure to provide information during negotiation.
3. Expanding the scope of regulated transactions, including adding transportation commissions and adjusting thresholds not just by capital but also by number of employees, to capture some entities previously outside the law.

A key goal of these amendments is to ensure so-called "pass-through" (Japanese: 転嫁 tenka) of increases in labour, raw materials and energy costs, meaning subcontractors should be able to pass on the increased costs they face onto their customers. The amendment has also made changes to the title of the act and the terminology used.

- The title of the act will be revised from “Act Against Delay in Payment of Subcontract Proceeds, etc. to Subcontractors”" to “Act Against Delay in Payment of Fees, etc. to Small and Medium-sized Entrusted Business Operators in Manufacturing and Other Specified Fields” (Japanese: 製造委託等に係る中小受託事業者に対する代金の支払の遅延等の防止に関する法律).
- The term subcontractor (Japanese: 下請事業者 shita-uke-jigyōsha) was considered as somewhat pejorative (shita carries the meaning of "below" in Japanese) and will be replaced by the term "small and medium-sized entrusted business operators" (Japanese: 中小受託事業者).
