= Kumano Sea =

Body of water belonging to North Pacific Ocean

Coordinates: 33°47′N 136°20′E

Location of Kumano Sea

The Kumano Nada (Japanese: 熊野灘) is a body of water belonging to North Pacific Ocean (Philippine Sea) located off the coast of Kumano Region of the Kii Peninsula located in central Japan.
