= Ikuo Hirayama =

Japanese artist (1930–2009)

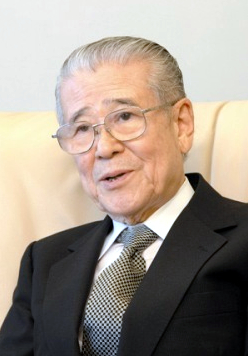
Ikuo Hirayama

Ikuo Hirayama (平山 郁夫; 15 June 1930 – 2 December 2009) was a Japanese Nihonga painter and educator. Born in Setoda-chō, Hiroshima Prefecture, he was famous in Japan for Silk Road paintings of dreamy desert landscapes in Iran, Iraq, and China.

== Biography ==
In 1952, he graduated from the Tokyo School of Art, or what is today's Tokyo National University of Fine Arts and Music (popularly known as "Geidai"), and became a disciple of Maeda Seison. Hirayama also served as President of his alma mater twice (1989–95 and 2001–05).

He produced a series of paintings depicting the introduction of Buddhism to Japan. A hibakusha, he portrayed the A-bomb attack on Hiroshima. He was also active in the preservation of the cultural heritage of the world (e.g., the Bamiyan Buddhas) and is internationally appreciated for his efforts in this sphere. Hirayama was awarded the French Légion d'honneur Order in 1996 and Japan's Order of Cultural Merit in 1998 amongst others. He was the President of the Tokyo University of fine Arts and Music and President of the Japanese National Commission for UNESCO.

During his tenure as President of Tokyo National University of Fine Arts and Music, Hirayama's commercial activities drew some criticism, and questions regarding the authorship of certain works were raised. He was a patron of historical institutions and gave £500,000 to the British Museum for the creation of The Hirayama Studio, a conservation studio specializing in Eastern pictorial art, which was opened in 1994 and named after him. He had a studio in Kamakura, Kanagawa. He also established the Hirayama Trainee Curator in Silk Road Coins at the British Museum. There are two museums dedicated to the artist: the Hirayama Ikuo Museum of Art located in his hometown in Setoda and the Hirayama Ikuo Silk Road Museum in Hokuto, Yamanashi.

The Prix Hirayama is awarded by the Académie des Inscriptions et Belles Lettres for distinguished contributions to scholarship on Asia.

== Collection ==
Ikuo Hirayama actively collected material relating to the historical silk road. The Hirayama Ikuo Silk Road Museum includes Chinese and Gandhara sculpture, Sasanian and Central Asian silver ware, toilet trays and coins, in total at least 222 pieces. His collection is particularly notable for its collection of Gandharan art from Pakistan and Afghanistan. His collection of Central Asian coins was small, containing only 101 items, though these included one of the best preserved of Kanishka I's Buddha coins as well as other important examples.
