= City-Yuwa Partners =

Japanese law firm

City-Yuwa Partners シティユーワ法律事務所
- Headquarters: Tokyo, Japan
- No. of offices: 1
- No. of lawyers: 123 (Nov. 2013)
- Major practice areas: General practice
- Date founded: February 1, 2003
- Website: http://www.city-yuwa.com/english/index.html

City-Yuwa Partners (シティユーワ法律事務所) is a law firm in Tokyo, Japan.

The firm was formed February 1, 2003 upon the merger of Yuwa Partners, a firm specializing in international M&A (Mergers and acquisitions) and financial transactions, and the Law Department of Tokyo City Law & Tax Partners, a large domestic legal and tax practice. The firm expanded its offerings to include intellectual property by merging with patent litigation firm Ohba, Ozaki & Shimasue in September 2005. The firm doubled in size from 2005 to 2009, becoming a general legal practice.

Asialaw ranks the firm as "highly recommended" in the fields of banking and finance, capital markets, corporate/M&A and investment funds.
