= Kanon Kasuga =

Japanese actress (born 2003)

- 春日香音
- Born: November 1, 2003 (age 22); Tokyo, Japan
- Occupations: Actress, Tarento
- Years active: 2007-present
- Employer: Nichi Park Productions

Kanon Kasuga (春日香音) (born November 1, 2003) is a Japanese child actress from Tokyo. Her agency is Nichi Park Productions, a division of Nippon TV.

== Television Dramas ==
- Hataraki Man (2007, NTV)
- Shōkōjo Seira (2009, TBS)
- Natsu no Koi wa Nijiiro ni Kagayaku (2010, Fuji TV)
- Deka Wanko (2011, NTV, episode 2)
- Namae o Nakushita Megami (2011, Fuji TV)
