= Masao Sasakibara =

Japanese fighter pilot

- 佐々木原 正夫
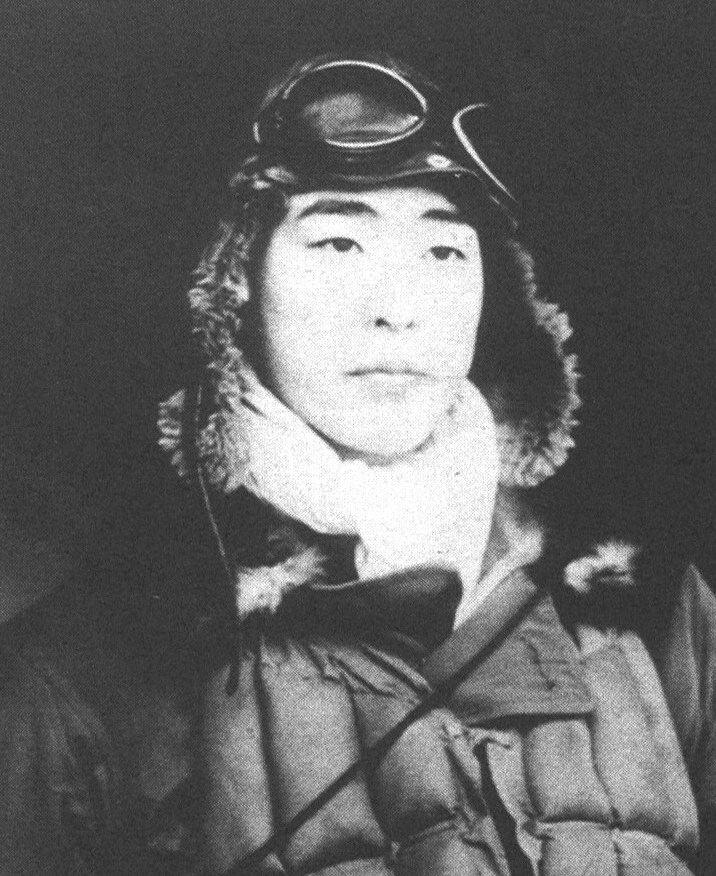
- Sasakibara on the carrier JUNYO in June 1942 during the Aleutian Islands Campaign
- Born: 1921; Aomori, Japan
- Died: 2005 (aged 83–84)
- Military career
- Allegiance: Empire of Japan
- Branch: Imperial Japanese Navy Air Service (IJN)
- Rank: Ensign
- Units: Shōkaku; Junyō; 343rd Naval Air Group
- Conflicts: World War II; Attack on Pearl Harbor; Indian Ocean raid; Battle of the Coral Sea; Battle of Dutch Harbor; Guadalcanal Campaign; Battle of the Eastern Solomons; Battle of the Santa Cruz Islands; Operation Ke

Masao Sasakibara (佐々木原 正夫, Sasakibara Masao; 1921–2005) was an ace fighter pilot in the Imperial Japanese Navy during World War II. Participating in many of the Pacific War battles and campaigns as a member of several units, Sasakibara was officially credited with destroying 12 enemy aircraft. He was seriously injured while supporting the Ke operation during the Guadalcanal Campaign, but survived after a lengthy stay in the hospital. He returned to Japan in June 1945 and survived the war.
