= Japanese competition law =

Japanese competition law consists of the Antimonopoly Act (独占禁止法, Dokusen Kinshihō; "AMA"), officially the Act on Prohibition of Private Monopolization and Maintenance of Fair Trade (私的独占の禁止及び公正取引の確保に関する法律, Shiteki-dokusen no Kinshi oyobi Kōseitorihiki no Kakuho ni Kansuru Hōritsu; Act No. 54 of April 14, 1947), and several other statutory laws such as the Subcontract Act.

The AMA was introduced during the postwar United States-led-and-controlled Allied occupation. President Harry S. Truman, on 6 September 1945, issued a presidential directive instructing the Supreme Commander for the Allied Powers (SCAP) to dissolve Zaibatsu structures. Prior to World War II, Japan had no antitrust laws. There were seventeen Zaibatsu organisations, the four largest of which had controlled approximately a fourth of all of the paid-up capital in the Japanese economy just prior to the World War.

== Cartels still exist ==
The JFTC regards cartels as core offenses against free and fair competition and regularly imposes sanctions. The JFTC also has the authority to refer cartel and bid-rigging cases for criminal prosecution, and it has done so in particularly serious cases. For instance, in 2018, criminal proceedings were brought against four construction companies accused of bid-rigging for the construction of new stations on the maglev railway, which will connect Tokyo and Nagoya.

Although there was a time when Japan was referred to as the "cartel archipelago", those days are long gone. The exemptions for cartels in the AMA have all been abolished and only narrow exemptions survive in special legislation, such as the Small and Medium-sized Enterprise Organization Act, which allows certain cooperative price-setting by SME cooperatives or federations to counterbalance bargaining disparities, subject to approval.

== See also ==
- Law of Japan
