= Bid rigging =

Form of procurement fraud

Bid rigging is a fraudulent scheme in a procurement action that enables companies to submit non-competitive bids. It can be performed by corrupt officials, by firms in an orchestrated act of collusion, or by officials and firms acting together. This form of collusion is illegal in most countries. It is a form of price fixing and market allocation, often practiced where contracts are determined by a call for bids, for example in the case of government construction contracts. The typical objective of bid rigging is to enable the "winning" party to obtain contracts at uncompetitive prices (i.e., at higher prices if they are sellers, or lower prices if they are buyers). The other parties are compensated in various ways, for example, by cash payments, or by being designated to be the "winning" bidder on other contracts, or by an arrangement where some parts of the successful bidder's contract will be subcontracted to them. In this way, they "share the spoils" among themselves. Bid rigging almost always results in economic harm to the agency which is seeking the bids, and to the public, who ultimately bear the costs as taxpayers or consumers.

== Forms ==
=== As acts of corruption ===
- Change order abuse occurs when a contractor colludes with project officials, wins a low bid, and asks to change the contract afterwards. That is approved by officials, resulting in a much higher bid being retroactively approved.
- Bidder exclusion allows project officials to essentially choose their bid. There are multiple methods to achieve that, like the following:
  - Instituting unreasonable qualification parameters, excluding non-preferred firms, or effectuating the same by shortening the time of acceptance periods for new bids following a request.
  - Advertising projects to select bidders or bidding markets, thereby reducing publicity of bid procurement.
  - Bundling of contracts to exclude bidders.
  - Coercion and intimidation can also be used, as well as the simple rejection of individual bids over trivial matters.
- Purchase splitting to reduce the minimum bid amount. That functions as contracts are split up to reduce the actual procurement amount and keep it under a threshold value. That reduces competitive bidding and enables less oversight at the project level as bid prices drop and kickbacks can be allotted.
- Leaking of bid information, which requires a relationship of some degree between the project and a bidder as the bidder is handed information to gain an unfair advantage.
- Bid manipulation is another method for officials to choose the bidder of their choice but occurs after receipt of bids. The methods for this would include either changing bid parameters, evaluation processes, or other activity to effectively select the bidder of choice.
- Rigged Specifications allow more bidder exclusion by officials by either tailoring requests to individual bidders or creating a vague criterion to reasonably choose a preferred bidder.
- Unbalanced bidding involves high bid prices for commencing phases of development and low prices for later stages. That effectively increases the flow of funds for the bidding firm. This occurs when bidders cite high prices for items, intending to raise the number of units and purchase them at a competitive rate while simultaneously skimming profits from the artificially high bid price. Additionally, bidders may give low quotes for non-necessary items (knowledge gained through collusion or experience) to disadvantage other firms as their bid amount is more competitive. This also serves to increase the cost of entry for new firms.
- Unjustified sole source awards are bids chosen on criteria unrelated to their competitiveness. That can be performed blatantly, by falsifying bids, or by price splitting.

=== Within a cartel ===
- Bid suppression collusion occurs when some of the conspirators agree not to submit bids to allow another conspirator to win the contract.
- Complementary bidding, also known as cover bidding or courtesy bidding, occurs when some of the bidders agree to submit bids that are intended to be unsuccessful so that another conspirator can win the contract. For example, the cover bids might contain prices that are uncompetitive in relation to the prices submitted by the conspirator, who is designated to win the contract, or the cover bids might contain conditions that the conspirators know to be unacceptable to the agency calling for the bids.
- Bid rotation occurs when bidders take turns being the designated successful bidder. For example, each conspirator is designated to be the successful bidder on a certain contract, with conspirators designated to win other contracts. That is a form of market allocation in which the conspirators allocate or apportion markets, products, customers or geographic territories among themselves. This is then divided up such that each will get a "fair share" of the total business, without truly having to compete with the others for that business.
- Bid delegation can be a factor fostering the presence of bid rigging; for instance, it is the case of marketing agencies that bid for the same ad space on behalf of different and competing agents.).

=== As a seller, auctioneer or official ===
- Phantom bids or shill bids are false bids to trick a legitimate bidder into bidding more than would have otherwise been the case. The seller or auctioneer hires confederates to call out the phantom bids. If the phantom bid is the winner, the lot is hidden and comes back around for a second auction, or the second-highest legitimate bidder is informed that the first bidder was unable to make payment. In online auctions, the latter ruse is pulled via a (secretly illegitimate) "second-chance offer." Sniping is a legitimate bidder's best chance to foil a shill bidder who aims to drive up the price artificially.
- Buy-back is the strategy in which the auctioneer or seller bids on a lot and buys it back to protect it from being sold to the highest bidder for an insufficient price. That is fraud if the auction is advertised as an absolute auction, meaning that there are no reserve bids.
- Phantom auctions, in the real estate industry, may occur when the bank "tentatively" auctions a foreclosed home and gives bidders an option to give "preliminary bids" for homes that are not yet authorized for auction. If the reserve bids are not met, the home is updated as "never was available for auction" even though bids were received. Some houses are auctioned at fire-sale prices, and the auctions are closed before the auction was formally announced. Investors rush to get in their preliminary bids before the house is technically up for auction. Bidders fear losing options, so it results in more bids, and naturally, higher prices. If bidders fail to reach the target bids, the item is never available for auction. Banks do that because if they unloaded all of their toxic assets at once, the housing market would collapse, which causes foreclosed homes to be dribbled out with phantom auctions.

Those forms of bid rigging can occur together, and two or more of the practices could occur at the same time. For example, if one member of the bidding ring is designated to win a particular contract, that bidder's conspirators could avoid winning by not bidding ("bid suppression") or by submitting a high bid ("cover bidding").

== Economic costs ==
Many of the issues presented by bid rigging are the result of cartel involvement. Inefficient firms are not pushed out, as they would have been in a competitive market, and firms experience more profit, despite an inefficient allocation of resources. Cartels behave more like monopolies and so their behaviors, such as bid rigging, create market inefficiencies as contracts are fulfilled at elevated values. Furthermore, bid prices increase with more repeated collusion. Ultimately, the cost is typically borne by the taxpayer as government-sponsored contracts are artificially above market value. Additionally, it can be thought of as raising prices for the taxpayer (or consumer) as firms rent-seek. One study found that bid rigging significantly raised prices over market value in the seafood industry in Philadelphia in a bidding scheme involving Defense Personnel Support Center, a purchaser for the Department of Defense. The high price of entry and fewer entrants in many industries result in lessened incentives for firms to behave competitively.

== Detection ==
In the UK, the Competition and Markets Authority published an open letter in 2016 aiming to promote good practice among procurement and supply staff, and detailing indications they should watch out for.

== Remediation ==
Bid rigging is an illegal practice under the criminal or competition laws of most developed countries. Depending on the jurisdiction, it is punishable by fines, imprisonment or both.

At a very basic level, there would likely be more competitive bidding if there were more firms present in a market, outside of a cartel, as evidence shows that bids lessen in value as the number of firms rises. Furthermore, collusion becomes less frequent with better market competitiveness, a result of reduced ability to compromise.

The Organisation for Economic Co-operation and Development (OECD), in its work on bid-rigging and cartels in public procurement, makes the following suggestions for better tenders:

- Developing expertise and awareness of the market for which a tender is being designed.
- Maximizing the number of bids and potential contractors for enhanced competition among proposals.
- Striving for clarity in requirements and details.
- Reducing the potential for communication between bidders and procurement officials and adhering to a strict criterion and process of evaluation.

Suggestions for ameliorating procurement auctions have also been put forth. Lengstein and Wolfstetter suggest that when a particular bidder is preferred, disregarding cost, possible reforms include a sealed Vickrey auction, or if there is reason to believe that officials and bidders are in contact, an open auction is preferred to sidestep potential bribery. When officials are engaged in more competitive procurement processes with regard to price but are suspected of kickbacks, a potential solution is the open auction to prevent clandestine arrangements such as change order abuse. If a closed or sealed auction process is preferred, the use of electronic bidding and investment in tamper-resistant systems is suggested.

== Notable examples by region ==
=== South America ===
==== Brazil ====
Brazil's Operation Car Wash is an ongoing investigation into the Brazilian semi-public multinational Petrobras. Petrobras is suspected of having overcharged bids as much as 3% of the total cost on contracts with an alleged $2.1 billion being misappropriated in kickbacks. Operation Car Wash is part of a larger investigation into Brazil's government as well and has contributed to the conviction and imprisonment of former president Luiz Inácio Lula da Silva. In early January 2018, Petrobras settled a United States class action case for $2.95 billion, though JP Morgan and BTG Pactual had expected a settlement between $5 and $10 billion.

The Petrobras scandal extends beyond bid rigging in the oil sector, as the investigation has also implicated Brazilian construction firms, as bid rigging was discovered to be rampant in the preparations for the 2016 Summer Olympics. This would not be the first instance of bid rigging by construction firms in recent Brazilian history, as Andrade Gutierrez Engenharia SA, the nation's second largest construction firm, admitted to bid rigging during contract procurement for stadiums to host the 2014 FIFA World Cup. This revelation implicates an additional five domestic construction firms and was revealed by the Conselho Administrativo de Defesa Econômica(CADE).

==== Colombia ====
From 2002 until 2013, the Colombian government opened 121 investigations into bid rigging, which led to sixty-nine entities paying fines amounting to nearly $23.5 million, with an additional nine entities receiving sanctions. Colombia was found to generally comply with the OECD's recommendations regarding competitive procurement.

=== North America ===
==== United States ====
In the United States, bid rigging is a federal felony criminal offense under Section 1 of the Sherman Act. Even so, bid rigging is still rampant in the construction industry, auto sale auctions, and foreclosed home auctions.

The Justice Department announced its Procurement Collusion Strike Force (PCSF) in November 2019. The strike force coordinates a national effort against bid rigging, price fixing and related crimes affecting government contracts, grants and program funding at federal, state and local level. It brings together the department's Antitrust Division, the offices of several U.S. Attorneys, the FBI and the inspectors general of several federal agencies.

==== Canada ====
In Canada, bid rigging is an indictable criminal offence under Section 47 of the Competition Act.

=== Europe ===
Bid rigging is illegal in the European Union (EU) under Article 101 of the Treaty on the Functioning of the European Union (TFEU). The annual cost to the EU in economic waste as a direct result of bid rigging among cartels was estimated to be between €13 billion and €37 billion in 2008. Bid rigging seems to be on the rise across Europe, raising concerns particularly over excessive expenditures and single-bid tenders. These single-bid tenders represented 17% of tenders in 2006, but 30% nine years later. RAND estimated that the overall annual cost posed to the EU by bid cost increases was $5 billion.

==== Slovakia ====
Bid rigging is illegal in Slovakia under the Act on the Protection of Competition and by EU membership, also Article 101 of TFEU. The first charges to be brought to court in Slovakia in 2006 by the Antimonopoly Office involved six construction companies who submitted bids with suspiciously consistent unit quotes. The fines from this bid rigging scheme amounted to €45 million following an initial court decision, an overruling, and a reinstatement of the initial verdict. In 2007, a Slovakian government ministry participated in bidder exclusion by posting a request for proposals regarding consulting on a bulletin board in an official building, though not open to the public. This resulted in a consulting firm winning a €120 million contract. The word for receiving kickbacks after participating in bid rigging is known as "tunelovanie" in Slovak.

==== Switzerland ====
Bid rigging occurs frequently in the construction industry in Switzerland. In 2007, seventeen different firms were involved in a bid rigging scheme, but there was no prosecution as the ring had disbanded before colluding. In 2009, a ring of seven electricity firms from Bern was charged with bid rigging and fined two million Swiss francs. In Aargau, in 2011, a bid rigging scheme was discovered wherein seventeen firms were fined eight million Swiss francs, though the appeals are ongoing. Multiple other cases are still ongoing.

==== United Kingdom ====
In the United Kingdom, individuals can be prosecuted criminally under the Enterprise Act 2002.

In 2011, fines were levied by the Office of Fair Trading (OFT) on 103 construction companies found to have engaged in illegal bid-rigging schemes. The OFT commented that cover pricing, the form of bid rigging involved in these cases, was widespread in the UK construction industry.

"Indeed, the OFT uncovered evidence of cover pricing in over 4000 tenders involving over 1000 companies but had to focus its investigation on a limited number of companies and instances where the available evidence was strongest, in order to make best use of its resources and conclude its investigation within a reasonable timeframe. The OFT could not, therefore, pursue every firm suspected of involvement in cover pricing."

Cover pricing involves high price bidding, intended "to give the appearance of genuine competition", by businesses who, "in reality, ... are not competing".

Many of the businesses involved cooperated fully with the OFT investigation and it was acknowledged that they had changed their bidding practices and provided staff training on competition law once the OFT had raised the issue.

The fines were subsequently deemed to be "excessive" and the Competition Appeal Tribunal revised the values of the fines. The tribunal decided that the OFT had used turnover figures for the wrong year when calculating fines, and treated the bid-rigging as more serious than it should have done, although in some other respects the OFT's ruling was upheld.

=== Asia ===
==== Japan ====
Although both a violation of Japanese criminal law and the Japan Anti-Monopoly Law, bid rigging is still a habitual practice of the Japanese construction industry. It has been shown by a number of academic studies both in Japan and in the US to be a system which considerably inflates the cost of construction projects, and in the Japanese public sector, considerably wasteful of annual tax money amounting to billions of Japanese yen.

Dango refers to collusion in Japanese, or more precisely, "conference", and is an extremely prevalent system in Japan. Dango can be understood as a mutually beneficial system of bureaucracy and government and the private construction industry wherein bid rigging is incredibly common, benefiting colluding firms and officials alike in the form of kickbacks. The system of dango is often supported, though, as allowing small firms to continue to compete, though detractors are quick to point to the economic inefficiencies presented by a non-competitive market. The US Government, specifically the United States Trade Representative Office and Department of Commerce, made fierce efforts in the late 1980s and early 1990s to urge the Japanese government to reform dango as a de facto non-tariff barrier to foreign firms in the Japanese construction market. Despite years of negotiations, including promises by the Japanese government in the Structural Impediment Initiative (SII) trade talks, the practice was never fully stamped out and continued to flourish.

In 2006, Tadahiro Ando, the then governor of Miyazaki Prefecture, resigned over a series of bid rigging allegations and was subsequently sentenced to over three years in jail.

As of 2008, thirteen lawsuits were still pending over 1990s' bid rigging for local government contracts to supply incinerator plants.

==== Korea ====
In a three-and-a-half-year period from 1995 to 1998, there was an estimated $4.13 billion surcharge attributed to bid rigging in Korea's construction industry, representing 15.5% of the total spent. It was also found that firms already present in an area enjoyed a significant degree of incumbency, meaning that they were more likely to continue to win additional contracts in areas they were already developing. This was discovered to be a result of complementary bidding. Some legal action has been undertaken against these bid rigging schemes, with nine contracting companies and several officials being charged and fined $5 billion in 1999.

== See also ==
- Bribery
- Cartel
- Collusion
- Corruption
- Operation Car Wash
- Organized crime
- Price fixing
