= Tadahiro Ando =

- 安藤 忠恕

Governor of Miyazaki Prefecture
- In office 5 August 2003 – 23 January 2007
- Monarch: Akihito
- Preceded by: Suketaka Matsukata
- Succeeded by: Hideo Higashikokubaru

Personal details
- Born: 9 March 1941 Saito, Miyazaki, Japan
- Died: 30 April 2010 (aged 69) Miyazaki City, Miyazaki, Japan
- Party: Independent
- Education: University of Miyazaki

Tadahiro Ando (安藤 忠恕, Andō Tadahiro; 9 March 1941 – 30 April 2010) was the Governor of Miyazaki Prefecture from 2003 to 2006. In 2009, Ando was convicted of bribe-taking and bid-rigging which were offences that he had committed earlier when he was governor.
