= Norman Tolman =

American art dealer and collector (1936–2025)

- Born: July 12, 1936; Walpole, Massachusetts, U.S.
- Died: January 15, 2025; St. Luke's International Hospital, Chūō City, Tokyo
- Resting place: Zōjō-ji, Tokyo
- Education: University of California, Berkeley (B.A.), Yale University (M.A.), IUC, Tokyo University
- Occupation: Art dealer
- Years active: 1972–2024
- Organization: The Tolman Collection
- Known for: Advancing the international recognition of contemporary Japanese graphic art

Norman Herbert Tolman (July 12, 1936 – January 15, 2025) was an American art dealer and art collector, best known for his role in championing contemporary Japanese graphic art. He was the founder of The Tolman Collection, a leading publisher and exhibitor of contemporary Japanese graphic art. Tolman exhibited and befriended artists like Saitō Kiyoshi, Shinoda Toko and Mori Yoshitoshi.

== Early life ==
Tolman was born in Walpole, Massachusetts in 1936, the youngest of four children. He was raised by his mother and his older sister, and took up a newspaper route at age 7 to help support the family.

== Education ==
Tolman graduated from Watertown High School in 1954, going on to enlist in the United States Air Force and serving from 1954 to 1958. During his Air Force career, his exceptional linguistic abilities led the Air Force to select him as one of the top 40 of 400 servicemen studying Chinese, earning him a place at Yale University for nine months of intensive language study.

Tolman met Mary Spellman while they were both taking night classes at Georgetown University in 1957. They married in 1958, and in 1959, the couple moved to Berkeley. In 1962, Tolman got a B.A. in East Asian Studies at UC Berkeley, while working as a translator and editor. Tolman went on to get a scholarship, allowing him to obtain a M.A. in Asian Studies at Yale in 1964. He also received a Title VI NDEA Fellowship that same year to study at the Inter-University Center for Japanese Language Studies (then located in Mitaka, Tokyo and administered by Stanford University) and Tokyo University, studying Japanese.

After the IUC and Tokyo University, Tolman returned to U.C. Berkeley in 1965 with his family to spend two years pursuing graduate studies in Japanese, Chinese, and Tibetan languages.

== Diplomatic career ==
Following his Yale language training, Tolman worked abroad in Taiwan and at the NSA in Fort Meade, Maryland as a Chinese-language specialist.

After his graduate studies at Berkeley, Tolman left academia to accept employment as a cultural affairs officer in the USIA. He was initially posted to the U.S. Consulate in Hong Kong in 1967 for a year, before being subsequently posted in 1969 to the U.S. Embassy in Tokyo. Between 1970 and 1972, Tolman was the Director of the American Cultural Center in Sapporo and then in Kyoto, acting as a liaison between the United States and Japan by hosting cultural events, lecturers, and dignitaries.

Of his diplomatic career, Tolman highlighted entertaining guests like Duke Ellington and Willem de Kooning in his home, as well as the pleasure of escorting a rock brought back from the moon that was displayed in the U.S. Pavilion at Expo '70 in Osaka.

== The Tolman Collection ==
Tolman's love of Japanese prints saw him trade embassy work for art dealing. He founded The Tolman Collection of Tokyo alongside his wife Mary Tolman in 1972, with the purpose of introducing contemporary Japanese prints to a global audience.

Before becoming leading publishers of contemporary Japanese prints, their first gallery was located in Suginami-ku, "with six prints by six artists". These artists were Funasaka Yoshisuke, Iwami Reika, Clifton Karhu, Miyashita Tokio, Yayanagi Go, and Tsubota Masahiko.

During the gallery's founding period, Norman and Mary Tolman contributed weekly columns to the Mainichi Shimbun. Norman's column, titled Japanophiles, explored foreign enthusiasts of Japanese culture, while Mary's Behind the Scenes, offered insights into the Japanese art world. This developed into writing columns about artists like Shinoda Toko, with The Tolman Collection becoming her main dealer for over 40 years. Shinoda released more than 315 numbered editions exclusively for The Tolman Collection, and the gallery's sales of her paintings eventually numbered over a thousand.

In the 1980s, the Tolmans relocated the gallery to a former ryotei in the Shibadaimon area of Minato-ku, where it still remains today. Over the following decades, the Tolmans traveled extensively and set up galleries across the world. At one point, The Tolman Collection had locations in Paris, London, Hong Kong, Singapore, Shanghai, and New York City. On the topic of The Tolman Collection, Tolman has said: "We do things in a Japanese way with an American undertone, and I think the combination is a successful one."

As of 2024, the Tokyo and New York galleries are in operation, in addition to a robust online presence.

The types of art techniques found in The Tolman Collection's gallery include woodblock, etching, lithograph, mezzotint, drypoint, stencil, silkscreen, painting, and sculpture.

=== Artists ===
Artists represented or exhibited by The Tolman Collection include:

- Shinoda Toko
- Saitō Kiyoshi
- Yoshitoshi Mori
- Iwami Reika
- Clifton Karhu
- Tanaka Ryohei
- Yayanagi Go
- Wako Shuji
- Daniel Kelly
- Hamanishi Katsunori
- Tsubota Masahiko
- Hasegawa Yuichi
- Sarah Brayer
- Takahashi Hiromitsu
- Imamura Yoshio
- Seiko Kawachi
- Kawamura Sayaka
- Kinoshita Taika
- Kuroda Shigeki
- Nakazawa Shinichi
- Nagai Kenji
- Nishimura Ryo
- Oda Mayumi
- Saito Noriko
- Tamekane Yoshikatsu
- Tsubota Masayuki
- Uchida Emi
- Yoshimatsu Junichiro

=== Selected exhibitions ===
Tolman has been extensively exhibiting Japanese art since the founding of The Tolman Collection. He was responsible for organizing major exhibitions of contemporary Japanese prints at institutions across the globe, including in Egypt, Finland, Kazakhstan, and Singapore.

Three of the largest exhibitions by The Tolman Collection include:

- 1990 Retretti.
- 1992 Cairo Opera House.
- 1996 Toko Shinoda: Visual Poetry, Singapore Art Museum, the first time a Japanese artist had been shown in that museum.

=== Publications ===
- Tolman, Mary; Tolman, Norman (1982). People Who Make Japanese Prints: A Personal Glimpse. Shobunsha Publications. Includes a foreword by James Michener.
- Tolman, Mary; Tolman, Norman (1982). Ouchi Makoto: Artist Warrior. Shobunsha Publications.
- Tolman, Mary; Tolman, Norman (1993). Toko Shinoda: A New Appreciation. Tuttle Publishing. ISBN 0-8048-1904-1.
- Tolman, Mary; Tolman, Norman (1994). Collecting Modern Japanese Prints, Then and Now. Tuttle Publishing. ISBN 0-8048-1936-X.
- Tolman, Mary; Tolman, Norman (2004). Karhu @ 77: A Personal Tribute. Abe Publishing. ISBN 978-4872421729.
- Tolman, Norman (2017). Things Are Seldom What They Seem.
- The Tolman Collection (2018). The Tolman Collection at Saito Kiyoshi Museum.

== Personal life ==
Norman Tolman married Mary Spellman in 1958. They have two daughters and a grandson.

Tolman served for ten years as a trustee of the Hara Museum of Contemporary Art in Tokyo.

Tolman had always been interested in fashion, being a friend and fan of Japanese designers like Issey Miyake and Hanae Mori. Tolman was also a vintage car enthusiast, having owned two Rolls-Royces, a Jaguar, and a convertible Bentley. He was a serious traveler, having visited eighty countries before his eightieth birthday.

== Death & legacy ==
Norman Tolman died in Tokyo, on January 15, 2025, at the age of 88. He had lived in Asia for over 60 years.

Following his death, Tolman's ashes were interred at Zōjō-ji Temple on February 19, 2026. This interment was noted by the Chief Abbot as a unique honor, representing the first time in his memory that a foreigner was interred at the temple. The distinction was accorded due to Tolman's long relationship with Zōjō-ji, where he organized several major art exhibitions.

Tolman's relationship with the temple began in 1980, when he staged his first exhibition there featuring the work of Shinoda Toko. In November 2018, Tolman organized an extensive tribute exhibition at the temple, titled "The Tolman Collection's Tribute to Toko Shinoda at the Zojoji Temple," financially backed by Morgan Stanley and featuring her original paintings on loan from private collections. Notably, Zōjō-ji houses artist Shinoda Toko's largest painting, The Past, The Present, and The Future, a 29-meter, three-panel mural installed in 1974.

While the Tolmans developed their gallery, Tolman also collected art for his personal enjoyment, acquiring art from across the globe. He donated parts of his collection to institutions including the Yale University Art Gallery, the Museum of Fine Arts Boston, the University of Maryland, the Smithsonian Institution, and the Los Angeles County Museum of Art.

His most extensive institutional relationship was with the Smith College Museum of Art, beginning in 2007 with an initial gift of twenty prints made in honor of his daughter Hilary's 20th college reunion. Over the following 18 years, the gallery donated 144 prints to the museum, forming what is now known as the Hilary Tolman Collection.
