= Yoshitoshi (disambiguation) =

Tsukioka Yoshitoshi (1839–1892) was a Japanese woodblock print artist.

Yoshitoshi is a masculine Japanese given name. Other notable people with the name include:

- Yoshitoshi ABe (born 1971), graphic artist
- Yoshitoshi Mori (1898–1992), kappazuri stencil prints artist
- Sō Yoshitoshi (1568–1615), daimyō of Tsushima
- Yoshitoshi Tokugawa (1884–1963), lieutenant general in the Imperial Japanese Army and one of the pioneers of aviation in Japan

== Other uses ==
- Yoshitoshi Recordings, house music label owned and operated by Deep Dish
