= Ayomi Yoshida =

Japanese artist (born 1958)

Ayomi Yoshida (吉田 亜世美, Yoshida Ayomi; born 1958) is a Japanese artist, currently best known for her room-sized installations of woodchips that have been displayed in galleries and museums in Japan and the United States. Between 1979 and 1997, prior to creating installations, her main medium was woodblock printing.

== Contributions ==
Ayomi's use of prints, blocks, and wood chips in her installations has expanded the field of woodblock printing. As a member of a family of painters and print-makers, she has broadened her family's already varied artistic tradition through her unconventional approach to the art of woodblock printing. Her parents, Hodaka Yoshida (1926–1995) and Chizuko Yoshida (born 1924), had also each expanded this tradition before her.

Ayomi belongs to the third generation of woman artists in her family, and is preceded by her mother, Chizuko, and her grandmother Fujio Yoshida (1887–1987). All three lived together for 20 years in her parents' home in a Tokyo suburb. A succession of women artists like this is a rare phenomenon in Japanese art history.

== Education and Artistic Development ==
Neither of Ayomi's parents prompted her to become an artist. However, the process of making prints and the results were a part of her home-life and likely stimulated her own sensitivity to art. After studying art at Wakō University in Tokyo, Japan, she began making silkscreen prints at Mendocino Art Center in California in 1979. She won her first award for a woodblock print in the Sunshine Print Grand Prix exhibit in 1980, and her first one-person show was in 1981, just one year after her grandmother's large solo retrospective in Tokyo. (At the time, her grandmother was 93 years old, while she was 23.) She is a member of the Japan Print Association and her work was featured on the cover of their 1999 exhibition catalogue. She has exhibited also in the College Women's Association of Japan, the British Museum, the Minneapolis Institute of Arts, and in other venues including international print biennials.

== Work ==
The repetitive use of hand-carved ovals was a basic idiom in Ayomi's earliest woodblock prints. To produce these prints, Ayomi used a scooped chisel to hand-carve identically-sized ovals into the surface of the plywood. Her final products contained hundreds of ovals organized into straight lines, which covered the entire print area. In printing, colors were applied to moistened paper so that they mixed to produce additional colors. Sophisticated repetition and color effects characterize each print. Ayomi also produced prints with other forms and themes.

Later on, this repetitive process became the basis for creating on-site room installations, which deconstructed traditional woodblock art. To create these installations, Ayomi started with hundreds of blocks of plywood, each about 20 inches square. She painted each block red, then carved line after line of ovals into them and saved each removed chip, to produce a set of red blocks covered in concave, bare-plywood ovals, along with their red oval chips. The blocks were used to cover the surfaces of two walls, and the chips were pasted onto the other two walls which had been painted white, resulting in a polka dot effect. The effect for the viewer was that of walking into a total environment of complementary repetition and vivid sensory stimulation. It suggested the tempo of contemporary popular culture mediated through a restrained Japanese aesthetic. The first installation was in Yōseidō Gallery, Tokyo, with other galleries soon inviting her also. In 2002 the Minneapolis Institution of Arts became the site of Ayomi's largest installation. The Target Corporation Headquarters in Minneapolis is the site of the only permanent installation.
