= College Women's Association of Japan =

Japanese women's organization

- 一般社団法人カレッジ・ウィメンズ・アソシエーション・オブ・ジャパン
- Abbreviation: CWAJ
- Formation: 1949; 77 years ago
- Type: General incorporated association (一般社団法人)
- Purpose: Scholarships, education, cross-cultural exchange
- Headquarters: Shinagawa, Tokyo, Japan
- Website: cwaj.org
- Formerly called: College Women's Club of Tokyo

The College Women's Association of Japan (CWAJ) is a volunteer organization based in Tokyo, Japan, whose members are Japanese and non-Japanese women. Founded in 1949 as the College Women's Club of Tokyo, it funds scholarships for women's graduate study in Japan and abroad and for students with visual impairments of any gender. By 2025 it had awarded more than US$6.8 million in grants to over 875 women from 43 countries. Its programs are financed largely by the CWAJ Print Show, an annual juried exhibition and sale of contemporary Japanese prints held since 1956.

== History ==
=== Origins ===
From the late nineteenth century an alumni club in Tokyo brought together Japanese and American graduates of Mount Holyoke College and later Wellesley College. Ties among its members were renewed after the end of World War II, and the club became a fundraising body, sanctioned by the Allied Occupation, that paid the fares of Japanese students who had places at American universities; in the immediate postwar years passage to the United States could be bought only in dollars, at a fixed rate of ¥360 to $1.

The organization founded on this basis in 1949 grew out of the work of Ethel B. Weed, a lieutenant at the Allied Occupation headquarters in Tokyo's Chiyoda Ward who had been instructed to advance women's rights in Japan and who assembled a group of Japanese women with progressive views; they became CWAJ's founding members. Most had been imprisoned during the war for their politics, and Weed's assistant Nobuko Takahashi later became Japan's first female ambassador to Denmark. The printmaker Michiko Hoshino, writing in the art monthly Gallery, described the founding membership as combining the wives of senior American military, government and business figures posted to Japan after the war with Japanese women who had themselves studied overseas.

Membership, initially drawn from alumnae of American institutions, was later opened to women who had studied at universities in Japan and elsewhere. The organization was known as the College Women's Club of Tokyo until 1962, and the name "College Women's Association of Japan" was adopted in 1963. The association became a general incorporated association (一般社団法人) under Japanese law in 2013.

=== Shift to women's scholarships ===
CWAJ initially ran seminars and grants open to applicants of both sexes. According to president Heidi Zukoski Sweetnam, members observed that these were attended predominantly by men, and in 1972 the program was redirected to support Japanese women pursuing graduate study abroad. Sweetnam has attributed the decision to the barriers facing educated women in the Japanese labour market, where into the 1980s women were widely expected to leave work upon marrying. In 1978 the scholarship program was extended to students with visual impairments regardless of gender; according to The Japan Times, these were the first scholarships of their kind in Japan.

=== Structure ===
CWAJ is run entirely by volunteers and pairs Japanese and non-Japanese members as co-chairs of most positions, a system intended to generate culturally varied approaches. Membership stood at about 340 women from 24 countries in 2020 and about 400 from more than 30 countries in 2024, with thirteen board positions and some forty other roles. Officer and committee assignments rotate, so that volunteers move between catalogue production, negotiation with artists, exhibition installation and shipping and acquire a view of the organization as a whole.

== CWAJ Print Show ==
=== Origins ===
The first CWAJ Print Show opened in October 1956 with 91 works, all of them woodblock prints, by 39 artists. Gallery credits its creation principally to Oliver Statler, an American civilian employee of the United States military in occupied Japan, whose contact with Japanese printmakers led to his book Modern Japanese Prints: An Art Reborn (1956) and, in turn, to the founding of the exhibition. The show was also encouraged by the publisher Charles E. Tuttle and by Abe Yūji of the Yōseidō Gallery. It was conceived as a means of raising money for the association's scholarships, and many of its early buyers were foreign residents at a time when most Japanese households were still rebuilding their living standards.

It was launched toward the end of the most active period of the sōsaku-hanga or "creative print" movement, in which a single artist designs, carves and prints the work rather than dividing those tasks among specialists. The early shows consisted only of water-based woodblock prints in that tradition, by artists such as Un'ichi Hiratsuka. Writing for the Library of Congress, its curator of fine prints Katherine L. Blood records that works by pioneers of the movement including Hiratsuka, Shikō Munakata, Kōshirō Onchi and Kiyoshi Saitō were shown in that first exhibition; Onchi had died in 1955, the year before it opened. Munakata's work has also featured in the show in later years.

=== Format ===
The show has been held in Tokyo in almost every year since 1956, usually in autumn, and is accompanied by an online gallery. Works are selected by jury from open submission by artists resident in Japan, alongside a smaller number of invited guest artists; more than 200 works are shown each year, and the 2019 edition presented 213 artists chosen from roughly 800 submissions. The 2005 anniversary show also drew more than 800 entries, from which 221 works were selected by a jury of four museum curators: Chiaki Ajioka, formerly curator of Japanese art at the Art Gallery of New South Wales; Minoru Kouno, chief curator of the Machida City Museum of Graphic Arts; Kiyoko Sawatari, senior curator at the Yokohama Museum of Art; and Katsuhiko Yokoyama, chief curator of the Nerima Art Museum. Jurors are drawn from established printmakers and art critics and are not reappointed in successive years, a practice Gallery contrasted with the recurring panels common to Japanese art competitions.

Techniques represented include woodblock, engraving, mezzotint, intaglio, lithography, etching, aquatint, silkscreen and digital processes. Prices ranged from ¥5,000 to ¥400,000 at the 2019 show and from ¥3,000 at the 2020 online edition. The exhibition is prepared by a team of roughly fifty volunteers. Each year's catalogue carries a cover work by an established printmaker; Toko Shinoda's Fulfillment was used for the 50th show in 2005 and Hoshino was chosen for the 64th.

From its beginning the show was held at the Tokyo American Club, a membership club whose users were mainly American residents of Japan. Publicity officer Naoko Yakura attributed the eventual move to a change in the club's management policy, rising costs, and the limited audience a members-only venue could reach as the foreign resident population declined and few Japanese visitors attended. In 2017 the show moved to the Hillside Forum in Sarugakuchō, Shibuya, a street-level venue in the Daikanyama area that attracts passing visitors.

Three editions were held there before the COVID-19 pandemic. The 2020 exhibition, which was to have been the 64th and had been given the title "Fresh Wind", was cancelled; in its place the association mounted an online showing called the Open Print Art Gallery, presenting 235 works by 231 artists. The 64th show was postponed to 2021 and also held online, from 20 to 31 October, under the title "Possibility". CWAJ built the online platform with its own volunteers rather than outsourcing it.

Writing in the Nikkei Asian Review, Michiyo Nakamoto characterised the show as primarily a commercial and charitable event rather than one aimed at presenting groundbreaking work or exploring an artistic theme, and attributed its longevity to the breadth of styles on offer. Purchases and donations by overseas companies and individuals have given the show a role in introducing Japanese printmaking to audiences abroad. Artists shown have included Tadanori Yokoo, Toko Shinoda, Reika Iwami, Fumio Kitaoka and Chizuko Yoshida, alongside non-Japanese printmakers resident in Japan such as Clifton Karhu, Daniel Kelly and Joel Stewart. Four artists in the 50th anniversary show — Hideo Hagiwara, Kitaoka, Takumi Shinagawa and Yoshida — had also taken part in the original 1956 exhibition.

=== Collectors and reception ===
Foreign collectors supported the show from early in its history. James A. Michener, himself a collector of Japanese prints, sat on the selection committee in 1971, and Henry Kissinger bought four prints from the 1972 show. Lawrence Smith, keeper emeritus of Japanese antiquities at the British Museum, recalled that on his first visit in 1984 the works struck him as deserving "a wider audience". Empress Michiko attended the opening reception of the 60th show, held at the Tokyo American Club, on 29 October 2015, and viewed part of the exhibition.

CWAJ officers have described the show's buyers as predominantly foreign residents of Japan, with a high proportion of returning purchasers; publicity committee chair Asako Owada said the 2020 online showing sold substantially to former members who had left Japan. Yakura has said that the association's aim is for Japanese audiences, and younger people in particular, to become better acquainted with a form of printmaking widely collected outside Japan.

Artists have cited the show as a commercially reliable outlet: the printmaker Keisuke Yamamoto, who had exhibited for eleven years by 2019, said that prints sold well there, while Yoshikatsu Tamekane, whose work is held by the Museum of Fine Arts, Boston and the Bibliothèque nationale de France, described the association's early sales of his work as important to his career and has continued to contribute in support of its charitable aims.

=== Exhibitions abroad and museum collections ===
Touring versions of the show have been sent abroad at the request of overseas institutions, with works donated to their collections. The British Museum in London acquired a travelling CWAJ Print Show exhibition in 1986 and the Art Gallery of New South Wales in Sydney in 1993.

The Library of Congress became the third such institution, after conversations between the Library's Asian Division chief Hwa-Wei Lee and his friend Frederick Harris, an American artist working in Japan, led Harris to suggest the collaboration. Of the 221 prints shown at the 50th Print Show, 212 were donated to the Library in 2006 by the participating artists and by two Japanese galleries, the Tolman Collection of Tokyo and Gallery Gado. They were exhibited from March to June 2007 as On the Cutting Edge: Contemporary Japanese Prints from the 50th College Women's Association of Japan Print Show, presenting work by 187 artists aged from 20 to 90.

Exhibitions have since been held at Highfield Hall & Gardens in Falmouth, Massachusetts. The association maintains a USA Traveling Print Show, co-chaired by Joanne Fallon with Naoko Yagura as her counterpart in Tokyo. A third collaboration at Highfield Hall in 2025 paired a juried show of about 170 contemporary prints with "Trailblazers", a special exhibition marking the association's 75th anniversary, overseen by a CWAJ committee with Patricia Hiramatsu and Ritsuko Watanabe as lead co-curators, devoted to five women printmakers: Toko Shinoda, Chizuko Yoshida, Reika Iwami, Noriko Yanagisawa and Toeko Tatsuno.

=== Awards and accessibility ===
CWAJ established an Art Grant in 1985, which became an artist-in-residence program in 2011. A Print Show Award is also given; the 2019 award went to Tomoko Ogoshi for the lithograph Blue and Purple.

The Young Printmaker Award was created at the 50th show in 2005 to support printmakers beginning their careers. Candidates are limited to the roughly thirty students awarded an excellence prize at the previous year's National University Print Exhibition, held annually at the Machida City Museum of Graphic Arts in conjunction with the Print Society. One recipient is chosen each year and receives ¥500,000, exhibits at that year's Print Show, and is invited to show new work again three years later; applicants are asked to set out in advance how the money will support their printmaking. Seventeen awards had been made by 2021, when the recipient was Kanna Ōyama, a woodblock printmaker who harvests and processes kōzo in Fukushima Prefecture to make the large sheets of washi she prints on.

Since 1996 the show has included a "Hands-on Art" display in which raised reproductions of selected prints allow visitors with visual impairments to follow the outlines and shapes of the works.

== Scholarships and programs ==
CWAJ funds graduate scholarships for Japanese women studying abroad, for non-Japanese women studying in Japan, and for students with visual impairments studying in Japan or overseas. The association has put the cost of partially funding a Japanese woman's graduate study abroad at about US$24,000, and about $14,000 for study within Japan. By 2020 it had awarded roughly ¥1 billion to 857 recipients, and Gallery put the cumulative total at more than 800 recipients in 2021.

Crisis-response scholarships have twice been added. The Fukushima Relief Scholarships, awarded to students at the Fukushima Medical University School of Nursing, were established in the wake of the 2011 Tōhoku earthquake and tsunami and ran from 2012 to 2020, after CWAJ members involved in mental-health projects in the prefecture identified a need for continuing support. From 2021 to 2023, during the COVID-19 pandemic, the association funded a further award of ¥500,000 for women studying nursing in the Kantō region and Fukushima. The pandemic award was financed from the proceeds of the 2020 online show and open to second- and third-year students at universities in Tokyo, Kanagawa, Chiba and Saitama as well as Fukushima Medical University, with no age limit.

Former scholarship recipients include Nobuko Takahashi; Masako Egawa, later Seikei Gakuen chancellor and a board director at Mitsui & Co., who used her 1984 award to take an MBA at Harvard and in 2009 became the first woman appointed an executive vice-president of the University of Tokyo; disability advocate Kentaro Fukuchi; and Eri Tayama of UNHCR. Beyond scholarships the association runs English-language activities — described in 2014 as serving Japanese returnee children and visually impaired people, and in 2024 as serving children's homes and visually impaired learners — together with a cultural program for international students.

The organization is funded entirely by donations and by proceeds from events including the Print Show, and has cited fundraising pressure and a shortage of volunteers — the latter linked to rising workforce participation among women in Japan — as continuing challenges.

== See also ==
- Sōsaku-hanga
- Woodblock printing in Japan
