= Hiromitsu Takahashi =

Japanese contemporary artist

- Born: Takahashi Hiromitsu; 1959 (age 66–67); Kanagawa Prefecture, Japan
- Education: Nihon University
- Known for: Kappazuri stencil prints of kabuki figures
- Style: Kappazuri (stencil prints)
- Movement: Contemporary art
- Awards: Most Promising Artist, Grand Prix Exhibit, Isetan Art Gallery (1986, 1989)

Hiromitsu Takahashi (高橋 宏光, Takahashi Hiromitsu; born in 1959 in Kanagawa Prefecture), sometimes known simply as Hiromitsu, is a Japanese contemporary artist, specializing in kappazuri stencil prints depicting figures from the kabuki theatre.

Born in Kanagawa prefecture in 1959, Hiromitsu graduated from Nihon University in 1981, and currently operates out of the Tokyo area. An obvious successor to the ukiyo-e artists of the Edo period in his choice of subject (see yakusha-e, lit. "[kabuki] actor prints"), his methods and style show the strong influence of Yoshitoshi Mori, a stencil print artist whom Hiromitsu's parents served as printers.

Takahashi has taken part in solo and group exhibitions both in Japan and abroad. He was named Most Promising Artist at the Grand Prix Exhibit at the Isetan Art Gallery in Tokyo, in both 1986 and 1989.

== See also ==
- mingei
