= Sarah Brayer =

American artist (born 1957)

- Born: Sarah Brayer; May 25, 1957 (age 69); Rochester, New York
- Education: 1975–79 B.A. cum laude in Studio Art, Connecticut College, New London; 1978 Printmaking study, Middlesex Polytechnic, London, England; 1982–84 Woodblock printing, Toshi Yoshida, Miasa, Japan
- Known for: Washi Paperworks, Aquatint Etching, Woodblock Printing

Sarah Brayer (born May 25, 1957) is an American artist who works in both Japan and the United States. She is internationally known for her poured washi paperworks, aquatint and woodblock prints. In 2013 Japan's Ministry of Culture awarded Sarah its Bunkacho Chokan Hyosho ("Commissioner of Culture Award") for dissemination of Japanese culture abroad through her creations in Echizen washi. She currently resides in Kyoto, Japan and New York, U.S.A.

Sarah Brayer's art is in the collections of the British Museum, the Smithsonian Institution's Sackler Gallery, and the American Embassy in Tokyo. Brayer was featured at the TED Conference "The Young, the Wise, the Undiscovered" in Tokyo in June 2012.

Arriving in Kyoto Kyoto in 1980, Brayer studied etching with Yoshiko Fukuda and Japanese woodblock printing with Tōshi Yoshida (1911–1996) the son of influential woodblock artist Hiroshi Yoshida (1876–1950). Her interest in color gradation was piqued by the woodblock technique, and she subsequently applied similar gradations to her color aquatints. In 1986 Brayer began making large-scale paperworks in the historic paper village of Imadate, Echizen, Japan.

== Influences and early works ==
In the 70's Brayer became interested in Japanese aesthetics through the color aquatints of Mary Cassatt, and Raku-style ceramics. Arriving in Japan in 1979, she studied etching with Yoshiko Fukuda (1937–1986) and Japanese woodblock printing with Toshi Yoshida (1911–1996). In 2007, she was honored as the first western woman artist to have her work on the cover of the CWAJ Print Show catalog, the premier contemporary Japanese print show in Tokyo.

In 1985, Brayer exhibited at the Ronin Gallery in New York, and was reviewed in the NY Times, which noted Day Glow, a large, soft-ground aquatint of Charles Street in New York City that made striking use of Oriental techniques to catch dawn in lower Manhattan. In 1986 she opened her own print studio in an old kimono weaving factory in Kyoto. That same year she discovered the art of poured washi, and her interest in this technique led her to the historic washi paper center of Echizen in Fukui prefecture. She has been working in the village of Echizen ever since; the only non-Japanese artist who has worked in this 800-year-old village, home to living national treasure paper-makers. She is also the only westerner to work there continuously. In 1999, she received a grant from the College Women's Association of Japan (CWAJ), which enabled her to develop a pioneering print technique of using washi Japanese paper as a printing medium. Brayer's early works were realistic cityscapes and landscapes, figures or pathways through the snow. With continued experimentation, her imagery has become more abstract: the flow of a waterfall, the curve of a wave, or the passage of light through clouds.

== Recognitions ==
- In 2013 Japan’s Ministry of Culture awarded Sarah its Bunkacho Chokan Hyosho (“Commissioner’s Award”) for dissemination of Japanese culture abroad through her paper creations in Echizen washi.
- Sarah has been recognized in Japan as the first artist ever invited to exhibit at Byodoin Temple, a World Heritage site dating from the Heian period, as part of Kyoto’s 1200-year celebration in 1992.

== Collections ==
- The Herbert F Johnson Museum of Art: Oceanic Moon (2012 luminescent paperwork mural)
- The British Museum: Sojourn (1995 paperwork scroll), Dayglow (1984 aquatint), River Mist Kyoto (1982 woodblock), Yukata (1987 aquatint)
- The Sackler Gallery, Smithsonian: First Snow (‘91 aquatint), Expanse (‘95 aquatint)
- The Oregon Art Institute: Japanese Bath (‘86 aquatint)
- Zimmerli Art Museum: City Pearls (‘86 aquatint), City Light (‘85 woodblock print), Yellow Taxi (’93 paperwork/lithograph), Surge (‘95 editioned paperwork)
- Cincinnati Museum: Mankai (‘99 collagraph)
- Rochester Memorial Art Gallery: Mikazuki (’07 aquatint/paperwork), Yellow Taxi (’93 paperwork/lithograph), Spring Rice (‘82 aquatint),
- Cedar Rapids Museum of Art: Hint of Red (‘09 aquatint/paperwork)
- Smith College Museum of Art: Moontrance (‘00 lithograph)
- Shimonoseki Art Museum: Shimonoseki Pearls (’05 paperwork)
- Worcester Art Museum: Taki (’05 aquatint), Kyoto Snowfall (’81 aquatint)
- U.S. State Department: Dayglow (‘84 aquatint)
- U.S. Embassy, Tokyo: Kyoto Snowfall (‘81 aquatint)
- Newark Public Library: City Jewels (’86 aquatint), Moontrance (‘00 lithograph)
- American College Board Collection: Dayglow (‘84 aquatint)
- Johns Hopkins Hospitals: Ruby’s Paradise (‘93 paperwork)
- University Hospitals, Cleveland: Going Places (commissioned mural), Schoolgirls (‘86 aquatint), Schoolboys (‘86 aquatint), Blue Kyoto (‘87 aquatint)
- Citibank, Tokyo: Bather (‘88 lithograph)
- TRW, Los Angeles: Together (‘85 aquatint)
- RJ Reynolds: City Pearls (‘86 aquatint)
- Ozumo, San Francisco: Ryoanji Pools (‘04 paperwork), Source (‘04 paperwork)
- Ozumo, Oakland: Blue Surge (‘04 paperwork), Blue Moon (‘08 paperwork), Katsura Squares (‘08 paperwork)

== Solo exhibitions ==
- 2014 The Castellani Museum of Art, Niagara University
- 2013 The Verne Gallery, Cleveland, Ohio
- 2010 Luminosity: Night Paperworks, Kyoto
- 2010 The Ren Brown Collection, Bodega Bay, California
- 2010 Art in June, Rochester, New York
- 2010 30 Years of Art in Kyoto
- 2007 The Ren Brown Collection, Bodega Bay, California
- 2007 Gallery Bonten, Shimonoseki, Japan
- 2007 Round the Horn, Nantucket
- 2006 Whisper to the Moon, Kyoto
- 2005 The Ren Brown Collection, Bodega Bay
- 2005 Gallery Bonten, Shimonoseki
- 2004 Azuma Gallery, Seattle
- 2004 Tokyo American Club
- 2004 Esmay Fine Art, Rochester
- 2004 Ronin Gallery, New York
- 2002 Kato Gallery, Tokyo
- 2002 The Tolman Collection, Tokyo
- 2001 Hanga Ten, London, England
- 2001 Beatrice Royal Gallery, Eastridge, England
- 2000 Takashimaya Gallery, Yokohama
- 2000 Tokyo American Club
- 2000 The Tolman Collection, Tokyo
- 1999 The Ren Brown Collection
- 1999 Gallery Bonten, Shimonoseki, Japan
- 1998 Gallery Rewdex, Kyoto
- 1997 The Tolman Collection, Tokyo
- 1997 Ars Locus Gallery, Kyoto
- 1996 Ronin Gallery, New York
- 1996 Tokyo American Club, Tokyo
- 1996 Gallery Bonten, Shimonoseki, Japan
- 1995 Dieu Donne Gallery, New York
- 1995 WICE Artspace, Paris
- 1995 Daimaru Gallery, Osaka, Japan
- 1995 Kanda Gallery, Okinawa, Japan
- 1994 Takashimaya Gallery, Yokohama, Japan
- 1994 Shoestring Gallery, Rochester, New York
- 1994 A Sense of Place, The Verne Gallery, Cleveland, Ohio
- 1993 Takashimaya Gallery, Tamagawa, Tokyo, Japan
- 1993 Tokyo American Club, Tokyo, Japan
- 1993 The Ren Brown Collection, Bodega Bay, California
- 1993 Galeries Ann Monnet, Kyoto, Japan
- 1992 Sarah Brayer at Byodoin Temple Invitational honoring Kyoto’s 1200th year
- 1992 Azuma Gallery, Seattle, Washington
- 1992 Gallery Cocteau, Kyoto, Japan
- 1992 Shoestring Gallery, Rochester, New York
- 1992 Kanda Gallery, Okinawa, Japan
- 1991 Recollections: Tokyo American Club
- 1991 Takashimaya Gallery, Yokohama
- 1991 Daimaru Gallery, Osaka, Japan
- 1991 Takashimaya Gallery, Tamagawa, Tokyo
- 1990 Connecticut College, New London, Connecticut, Invitational
- 1990 Ronin Gallery, New York
- 1990 Shoestring Gallery, Rochester, New York
- 1989 Kato Gallery, Tokyo
- 1989 Gallery Blanche, Osaka
- 1989 Kintetsu Gallery, Kyoto
- 1989 Tokyo American Club, Tokyo
- 1989 Gallery San, Kyoto
- 1988 The Museum of Modern Art, Shiga, Japan
- 1988 April Sgro-Riddle Gallery, Los Angeles, California
- 1988 Daimaru Gallery, Kobe, Japan
- 1988 Shukugawa Gallery, Shukugawa, Japan
- 1987 Sumi Arts, Hong Kong
- 1987 The Japanese Bath and other Landscapes Carter Arcand Gallery, Portland
- 1987 Kato Gallery, Kobe, Japan

== Selected group exhibitions ==
- 2018 MOON, the Herbert F. Johnson Museum of Art, Ithaca NY
- 2014 Celestial Threads: The Asian Art Museum, San Francisco
- 2011 The William J. Dane Fine Print Collection, Newark Public Library
- 2009 IMPACT the Big Print, Orange Coast College, Costa Mesa, Cal. Curated by Donna Westerman
- 2009 WOOD. METAL. STONE: Contemporary Japanese prints The Flinn Gallery, Greenwich Connecticut
- 2007 Catalogue Cover artist and Poster artist, for the 52nd CWAJ Print Show, Tokyo, Japan
- 2005 The Color of Night: How Artists Work with Darkness, Zimmerli Art Museum, Rutgers University
- 2003 Japan Through Western Eyes, The Morikami Museum, Del Ray Beach, Florida
- 2003 Snow in Winter: Ukiyo-e and Contemporary Prints from Japan, The Daiwa Anglo-Japanese Foundation, London
- 2003 1853–2003: A Sesquicentennial Salute to Commerce and Cultural Exchange between Japan and the USA, the Newark Public Library, Newark NJ
- 2002 Rags to Riches: 25 Years of Paper Art from Dieu Donne Papermill: Milwaukee Art Museum, Milwaukee, Wisconsin. Travelling to Mariana Kistler-Beach Museum of Art and the Heckscher Museum of Art, Huntington, NY
- 2001 Rags to Riches: 25 Years of Paper Art from Dieu Donne Papermill, Kresge Art Museum, Michigan; Maryland Institute College of Art
- 1999 Miyabi: a Celebration of Beauty by Five American Artists of Kyoto, Sogetsu Museum, Tokyo. Produced by the Tolman Collection
- 1997 Across Cultures: Five Contemporary Artists from Japan, Allen Memorial Museum, Oberlin, Ohio
- 1995 Out of the Drawing Room, Recent Acquisitions: Works on Paper by Women Artists, The Memorial Art Gallery of the University of Rochester
- 1995 Works on Paper The Verne Collection, New York
- 1994 The Verne Collection, Cleveland, Ohio
- 1992 Almost a Century after Helen Hyde and Bertha Lum, the Mitzie Verne Collection, Cleveland
- 1992 Accent on Paper: 15 Years at the Dieu Donne Papermill Lintas Worldwide, New York
- 1990 Intaglio Printing in the 1980s The Jane Voorhees Zimmerli Art Museum, Rutgers University, New Brunswick, NJ
- 1988 Relief Printing in the 1980s The Jane Voorhees Zimmerli Art Museum, Rutgers University. Curated by Trudy Hansen
- 1987 Mary Ryan Gallery, New York
- 1987 Eight Artists from Kyoto Takashimaya Gallery, Yokohama
- 1987 Prints from the Yoshida Studio, Kabutoya Gallery, Tokyo
- 1986 "Curator’s Choice" Portland Art Institute, Oregon
- 1986 Saga Print Annual New York
- 1986 The Bank of Tokyo, Hong Kong
- 1986 April Sgro-Riddle Gallery, Los Angeles
- 1985 50/50 Monoprints-Prints Montgomery College
- 1984 The Caraccio Collection, Franklin and Marshall College, Lancaster
- 1984 American Painters from Kyoto, Ronin Gallery, New York
- 1984 Foreign Artists in Kyoto Hankyu Gallery, Senri Osaka
- 1982–2014 The College Women’s Association of Japan Print Show Tokyo
- 1998–2014 The New York Print Fair, the Armory, New York City
- 1982–2010 Kyoto Etching Association Annual Kyoto City Art Center

== Publications ==
- 2018 Sarah Brayer: The Complete Prints 1980–2018
- 2011 Cover Art, Kyoto Journal, Volume 76
- 2009 Cover Art, Kyoto Journal, Volume 73
- 2007 Cover art, 52nd CWAJ Print Show catalog. Tokyo Poster and postcard for CWAJ Print Show, Tokyo. Nick Jones, “Paper Moon” In Touch (TAC magazine), October 2007. Tokyo “Woman By the Sea”cover art, novel in Hebrew by Itai Kohavi, Tel Aviv
- 2006 Hand Papermaking summer 2006, noted exhibitions: Sarah Brayer
- 2005 April Vollmer, Intersections of East and West: Contemporary Printmakers in Japan, Contemporary Impressions, Spring 2005. “City Pearls” printed in the Zimmerli Journal 3, Zimmerli Art Museum, Rutgers University of NJ. "Woman By the Sea” cover art for Shakespeare's Will by Vern Thiessen, Canada Playwrights
- 2003 Rosemary T. Smith, Japan Through Western Eyes, 1854 to the Present, The Morikami Museum, Del Ray Beach, Florida CWAJ print artists and scholars create a good impression, The Japan Times, October 15, 2003 Kyoto Shimbun, feature article Nov. 11, 2003
- 2002 Angela Jeffs, Celebrating “washi” in tune with Kyoto winters, The Japan Times, Nov. 30, 2002 Dai-ichi Seimei Hall, cover art, The Rubio Quartet and Yoshiko Endo Tokyo American Club magazine “47th Annual Print Show”
- 2002 Kyoto Journal, inside art
- 2001 Wigmore Hall, cover art, The Rubio Quartet and Yoshiko Endo
- 2000 Sarah Brayer, Sarah Brayer Prints 1980–2000
- 1999 Isabel Reynolds,”American artist gets it down on paper, ” The Daily Yomiuri, April 15, 1999 Five American Artist of Kyoto, Hanga Geijitsu No. 104, Tokyo Japan, p. 111
- 1997 Betsy Franco & Michael Verne, Quiet Elegance: Japan Through the Eyes of Nine American Artists Across Cultures: Five Contemporary Western Artists from Japan Allen Memorial Art Museum, Oberlin College Bulletin Number 1 Trudy Hansen, Evolving Forms/Emerging Faces; Trends in Contemporary American Printmaking, Zimmerli Art Museum, Rutgers University
- 1995 Kyoto Journal, inside cover art, Spring 1995
- 1994 “Prints and Paperworks of Sarah Brayer,” Journal of the Print World, Spring 1994. Helen Cullinan, “Prints offer views of Japan,” The Plain Dealer, May 20, 1994.
- 1994 Review Roberto Casin, “Paper and Color,” Aboard magazine, May/June
- 1993 “Post Modern Japanesque,” Kimono, November 1992 Peter Mallett, “ Papermaking offers Creative, Colorful Medium,” Asahi Evening News, Sept. 5, 1993
- 1992 “Culture Portrait,” Photo, January 15, 1992 Journal of the Print World, Almost a Century after Helen Hyde and Bertha Lum, the Mitzie Verne Collection, Cleveland
- 1991 Stewart Wachs, “Painter’s Career Flourishes in Kyoto,” The Japan Times, Feb. 10, 1991. *review
- 1990 Ron Netsky, “Work from Kyoto to Brighton,” Democrat and Chronicle, May 20, 1990. *review Zimmerli Art Museum, Intaglio Printing in the 1980s
- 1989 cover art Alan Booth, Tsugaru; Looking for the Lost
- 1988 Zimmerli Art Museum, Relief Printing in the 1980s: Prints and Blocks from the Rutgers Archives for Printmaking Studios Ron Netsky, “From the Beauty of Kyoto to a Regional Print Show,” Democrat and Chronicle, March 6, 1988. Stewart Wachs, “Painting with liquid paper produces new genre for Brayer,”The Japan Times, November 21, 1988. *review
- 1985 Lawrence Smith, Contemporary Prints From Japan: Symbols of a Society in Transition Grace Glueck, The New York Times, March 22, 1985.* review

== Lectures and interviews ==
- 2018 Lecture, “Luminosity," The Stoikov Lecture in Asian Art, The Herbert F. Johnson Museum, Cornell University
- 2017 Lecture, The Print Club of New York, 2017 Presentation Artist
- 2001 Lecture, “Painting With Paper," The Japan Society, London England Lecture, “Painting With Paper “, Beatrice Royal Gallery, Eastleigh, England
- 1995 Lecture, "Viewpoints," the Memorial Art Gallery of the University of Rochester
- 1992 Feature story on Byodoin exhibition, NHK News, Kyoto, September 22 Byodoin exhibition, NHK News Kansai, September 25
- 1990 Lecture, “ Painting with Liquid Paper," The College Women's Association of Japan, Tokyo.
- 1989 Interview “Catch Up: Tokyo Art Expo,” Marui News, Tokyo, November
- 1988 Museum of Modern Art Shiga exhibition, NHK News, Kansai, November 12, 1988.

== See also ==
- Washi
- Etching
- Woodblock printing
- Tōshi Yoshida
- Hiroshi Yoshida
