= Kiyoshi Saitō =

Kiyoshi Saitō may refer to:

- Kiyoshi Saitō (artist) (斎藤 清, 1907–1997), Japanese printmaker
- Kiyoshi Saito (table tennis) (斎藤 清, born 1962), Japanese table tennis player, Olympic athlete
