= Yoshitoshi Mori =

Japanese artist (1898–1992)

Yoshitoshi Mori (森 義利, Mori Yoshitoshi; October 31, 1898 - May 29, 1992) was a Japanese artist who specialized in kappazuri stencil prints. He was for many years a member of the mingei folk craft movement, and was close with Yanagi Sōetsu, founder of the movement, and Serizawa Keisuke, among others, producing stencil-dyed textiles and other textiles arts before turning to prints later in his career.

Yoshitoshi is said to have influenced several major 20th century print artists, including Shikō Munakata and Hiromitsu Takahashi.

His colorful works generally depict scenes from the kabuki theatre, or subjects related to folk traditions and festivals. Art collector Ren Brown writes that Yoshitoshi's "figures are most often rendered with a simplicity that manages to denote great energy and movement. ... Mori is known for using earthy colors in his work, and for often positioning his figures in a somewhat contorted and dynamic mass."

== Early life ==
Yoshitoshi was born on 31 October 1898 in the house of his grandfather Genjirō Mori, in Nihonbashi, the eldest son of Yonejirō and Yone Mori. When he was four, his father left the household, and the family's wholesale fish business went bankrupt, forcing him, his mother, his brother and his grandfather to move into his aunt's house in Nihonbashi; there, with a great-uncle who ran a yokobue (flute) school and his mother and aunt both teaching nagauta, he was strongly influenced by traditional Japanese music.

In 1906, at the age of eight, a year after starting elementary school, Mori's mother remarried and moved away with her new husband, leaving him with his father's family, still living with his aunt. That same year he suffered a severe shock when he found his grandfather dead, having committed suicide, devastated by the failure of the family business. At thirteen he was forced to leave his private upper elementary school and take on odd jobs after the death of his uncle brought further financial hardship. That same year, 1911, he became drawn to Toyokuni's yakusha-e, the ehon of Yoshitoshi and Toshikata, and the theatrical prints of Gekkō, owned by his mother's new husband; prompted by these prints, he began drawing himself.

In 1915, at seventeen, he began studying with Shūhō Yamakawa while apprenticing under Seihō Yamakawa, a kosode craftsman and yūzen dyer, Shūhō's father. That same year he also received instruction in brush painting from Gotō Kōhō. At eighteen, together with Shūhō Yamakawa, he attended a party held by Kaburaki, which sparked his interest in ukiyo-e. Conscripted into the army for two years, he was sent to Korea at twenty; on his return he resumed studying with Yamakawa, but soon stopped, unable to close the artistic gap caused by his two years of military service. He would nonetheless soon begin studying at the Kawabata Ga-Gakkō, graduating in 1923 from its Japanese-style painting division, and studied once more with Gotō Kōhō.

In 1921 he entered a landscape painting on silk at the Kokuritsu Shin-Bijutsukan in Tokyo, and the following year, after submitting bijinga to the magazine Kōdan Rakugokai, he was offered a contract, which was never carried out because of the Great Kantō earthquake of 1923, which forced him to work as a salesman to support his aunt, who had lost her home in the disaster. After briefly working in the dye workshop of a family friend, in 1925 he opened his own workshop, designing kosode and dyes, and became a member of the Monyō Renmei; in the following years his business and reputation prospered despite the economic downturn caused by the Great Depression. In 1928, at thirty, he married the twenty-four-year-old Shimizu Iku, with whom he had two daughters, Eiko (1934) and Kozue (1936).

With his growing reputation as a textile designer, in 1938 he attended a lecture by Yanagi Sōetsu, which sparked his interest in the Mingei movement; he became a frequent visitor to the Nihon Mingeikan and turned to Yanagi for study and guidance, and also visited the celebrated textile designer Keisuke Serizawa. In 1940 he also met the artists Munakata and Sasajima. In 1942, at forty-five, his third daughter Ayako was born as the Pacific War raged; wartime restrictions on luxury goods made life difficult for silk-dyeing artists, and Mori lost his apprentices to conscription, while, as president of the Monyō Renmei, he helped fellow members cope with wartime shortages and restrictions. 1944 was a particularly difficult year as air raids on Tokyo intensified; his wife also fell gravely ill, and Mori struggled to care for her alongside their three young daughters, though that year he was granted permission to produce and sell kimono, signing his work under the craftsman's name Kōshū. His mother died in 1945, and he and his family were forced to relocate after the great air raid on Tokyo; with the war's end he received sufficient cloth and dye, under postwar allocations designed to help preserve traditional Japanese crafts, to continue his work. The early postwar years saw his textile work gain increasing renown, winning numerous exhibition prizes; in 1949 he built his house in Nihonbashi, Chūō-ku, where he would spend the rest of his life, and became an associate member of the craft section of the Kokugakai.

== Life and career ==
It was not until the 1950s that Yoshitoshi began creating works on paper, quickly becoming known as one of the key artists of the sōsaku hanga movement. In 1951, at the age of fifty-six, he began making mono-stencil prints on wood blocks and glass plates; in 1954, urged on by Yanagi, he submitted a print to the Nihon Banga-in. In the following years he produced and exhibited an increasing number of prints, earning praise from the foreign judges at the first Tokyo International Print Biennale in 1959. Continuing to draw acclaim, Mori finally devoted himself fully to printmaking in 1960, at sixty-two, signing a two-year contract with the Nihonbashi Gallery in Tokyo for the exclusive exhibition of his work. In 1962 his print Kagura no Dōke was included in James Michener's landmark print portfolio and companion book, The Modern Japanese Print: An Appreciation, further raising his profile outside Japan. In this print, the bold line and heavy mass of the stencil become a decisive resource, the colours carrying a sombre theatricality; a subtle sense of flatness coexists with a sense of weight, the absence of shading and the reliance on mass giving the overall impression of a rapid message delivered with vigour. Although the two opposing figures might seem to have stepped out of a turbulent scene from the commedia dell'arte, the manner of their depiction is purely Japanese: the face on the right derives directly from puppet theatre, immediately recognisable to any Japanese viewer, while the skirt and fan of the actor on the left recall both noh and kabuki; the particular colours used, and the placement of the seal, are likewise distinctly Japanese in origin.

He was criticized by Yanagi Sōetsu in a major debate in 1962, who accused Yoshitoshi of abandoning the mingei movement, after which he distanced himself from the movement even more so, and began to focus more exclusively on kappazuri stencil prints. The dispute arose as his work grew less craft-oriented and more purely artistic, provoking tension with Serizawa and Yanagi, who argued for using historical folk crafts as the starting point for new craft production, over the broader question of the distinction between craft and art; Mori subsequently dedicated himself fully to the art of kappazuri-e, left the craft division of the Kokugakai, and was no longer closely associated with the Mingei movement. He also left the Nihon Banga-in in 1964, remaining free of professional associations until 1982, when he was recommended for membership in the Nihon Hanga Kyōkai.

Yoshitoshi exhibited his works in numerous one-man shows in Japan in the 1960s, and took part in thirty international exhibitions between 1957 and 1977. He was awarded an honorary doctorate by Maryland University in 1984, and was formally honored by the Tokyo Metropolitan Government. He died on May 29, 1992, immediately following the end of what would be his final one-man gallery show, held at the Wako Gallery Tokyo.

== Later career ==
At the age of seventy-two, in 1970, Mori visited Europe, a journey that, in light of his final years, in which he turned toward classical Japanese literary themes such as the Genji Monogatari and the Heike Monogatari, producing two major print series based on these epic prose works:it can be regarded as a formative event. His print of Taira no Tomomori (1152–85), the historical general who led the Taira (or Heike) clan to victory at the Battle of Uji in 1180 during the Genpei War, but who, after the clan's defeat at the Battle of Dan-no-ura in 1185, drowned himself alongside many of his kinsmen by leaping into the sea with an anchor tied to his foot, brilliantly captures the warrior's ferocity, an effect heightened by the imposing dimensions of the sheet (1,120 × 720 mm).

In the 1970s Mori designed hundreds of prints, culminating, at the age of eighty-one, in a 1979 solo exhibition at the Honolulu Museum of Art, making him the first living artist to be so honoured. That same year he used the kakemono format for his portrait of Shōki subduing an oni, the massive form of Shōki filling the sheet, his divine strength conveyed through the intensity of his grip on the demon, the bulging muscles of his right arm, and the vivid, almost animated rendering of his robes and scholar's cap. Over more than thirty years, his subjects encompassed kabuki, artisans, festivals, women and figures from traditional tales, printed on either coloured or plain grounds; stylistically, his figures are typically arranged in contorted, dynamic masses of form and colour, consistently expressing a unique artistic vision.

== Collections ==
His work is held in several museums worldwide, including the British Museum, the Seattle Art Museum, the Brooklyn Museum, the University of Michigan Museum of Art, the Jordan Schnitzer Museum of Art, the Minneapolis Institute of Art, the Los Angeles County Museum of Art, the Harvard Art Museums, the Fine Arts Museums of San Francisco, the Museum of Fine Arts, Boston, the Birmingham Museum of Art, the Museum of Modern Art, Kamakura & Hayama, the Weatherspoon Art Museum, the Portland Art Museum, and the Metropolitan Museum of Art.
