= Inter-University Center for Japanese Language Studies =

- アメリカ・カナダ大学連合日本研究センター (Amerika Kanada Daigaku Rengō Nihon Kenkyū Sentā)
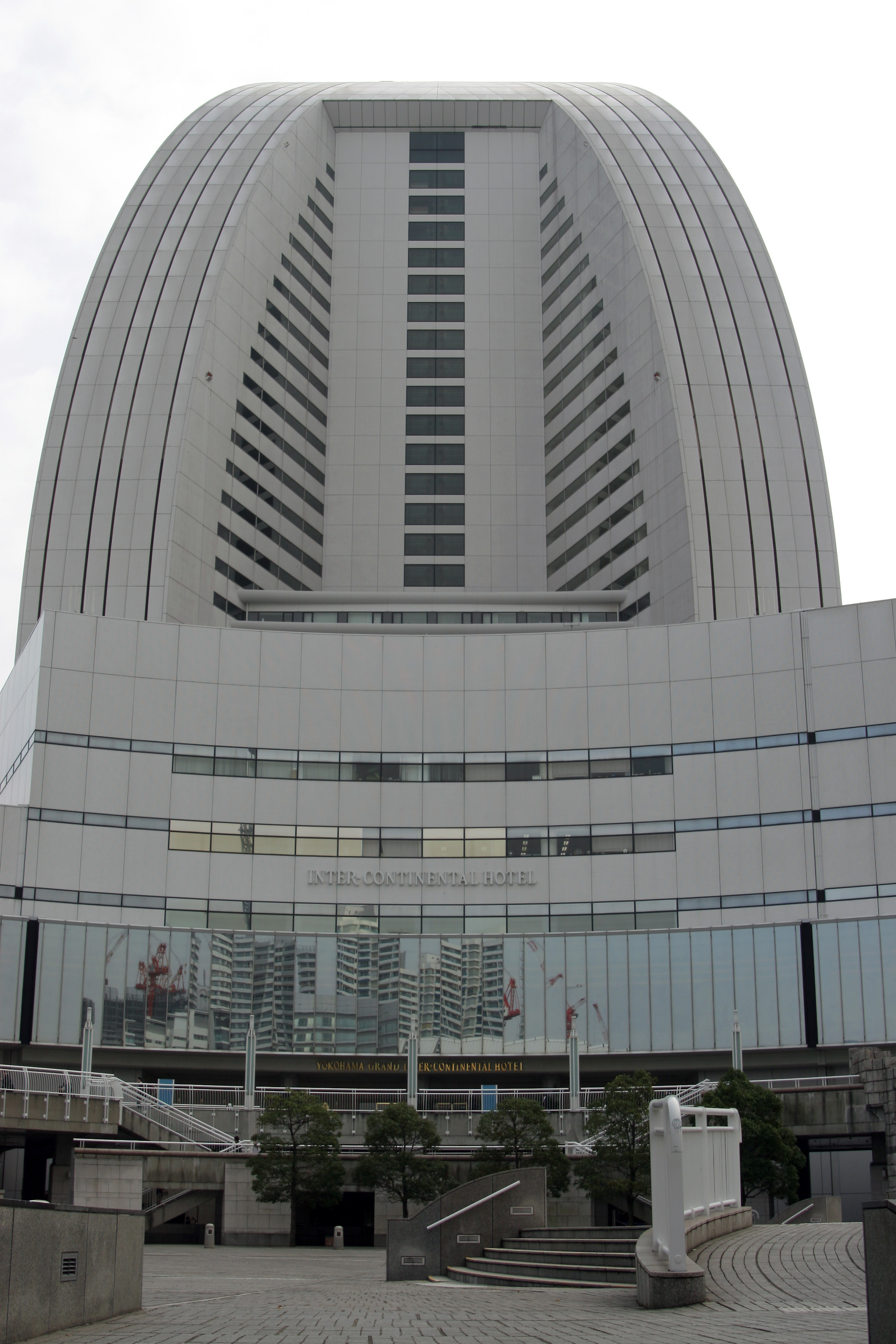
- Established: 1961
- Location: Yokohama, Kanagawa Prefecture, Japan
- Colors: none
- Nickname: IUC
- Website: https://iuc.fsi.stanford.edu

The Inter-University Center for Japanese Language Studies (アメリカカナダ大学連合日本研究センター, Amerika Kanada Daigaku Rengō Nihon Kenkyū Sentā), or IUC, is a Japanese language school located in the Minato Mirai area of Yokohama, Japan. Operated by a consortium of universities, the IUC provides advanced-level instruction to both undergraduate and graduate students and is considered one of the most selective and rigorous Japanese language programs in the world.

== History ==
The IUC was established in 1961 in Tokyo, Japan by Stanford University. Administration of the Center first moved to a consortium model in 1963; currently, 15 schools participate in the operations of the Center. The Center eventually moved to Yokohama, where it set up in the Pacifico Yokohama complex in the Minato Mirai port area.

== Program ==
The IUC offers one 10-month program during the academic year and another shorter program during the summer months. The programs are focused on advanced Japanese suitable for professional or academic use, and prospective students must have completed at least two years of college-level training and pass a language exam to be eligible for enrollment. Although often supplemented by a scholarship, the tuition for the 10-month program is $35,000, with a partial remission for students who are current students or recent alumni of a consortium school.

The IUC is considered one of the top Japanese schools in the world. Former U.S. ambassador to Japan and vice-president Walter Mondale called it "imperative for the sake of America's future relations with [Japan]", and former ambassador and Speaker of the House Thomas Foley noted that its graduates play a "central part" in the U.S.-Japan relationship.

== Publications ==
As a language school, the IUC continues to perform research into the Japanese language and has published a number of books and materials on the subject through the Japan Times Press.

== Consortium Members ==
- Brigham Young University
- Columbia University
- Harvard University
- Princeton University
- Stanford University
- University of British Columbia
- University of California, Berkeley
- University of California, Los Angeles
- University of Chicago
- University of Hawaiʻi at Mānoa
- University of Michigan
- University of Washington
- Yale University

In Association With:

- University of Illinois at Urbana-Champaign
- Washington University in St. Louis
