= Keisuke Serizawa =

Japanese textile designer (1895–1984)

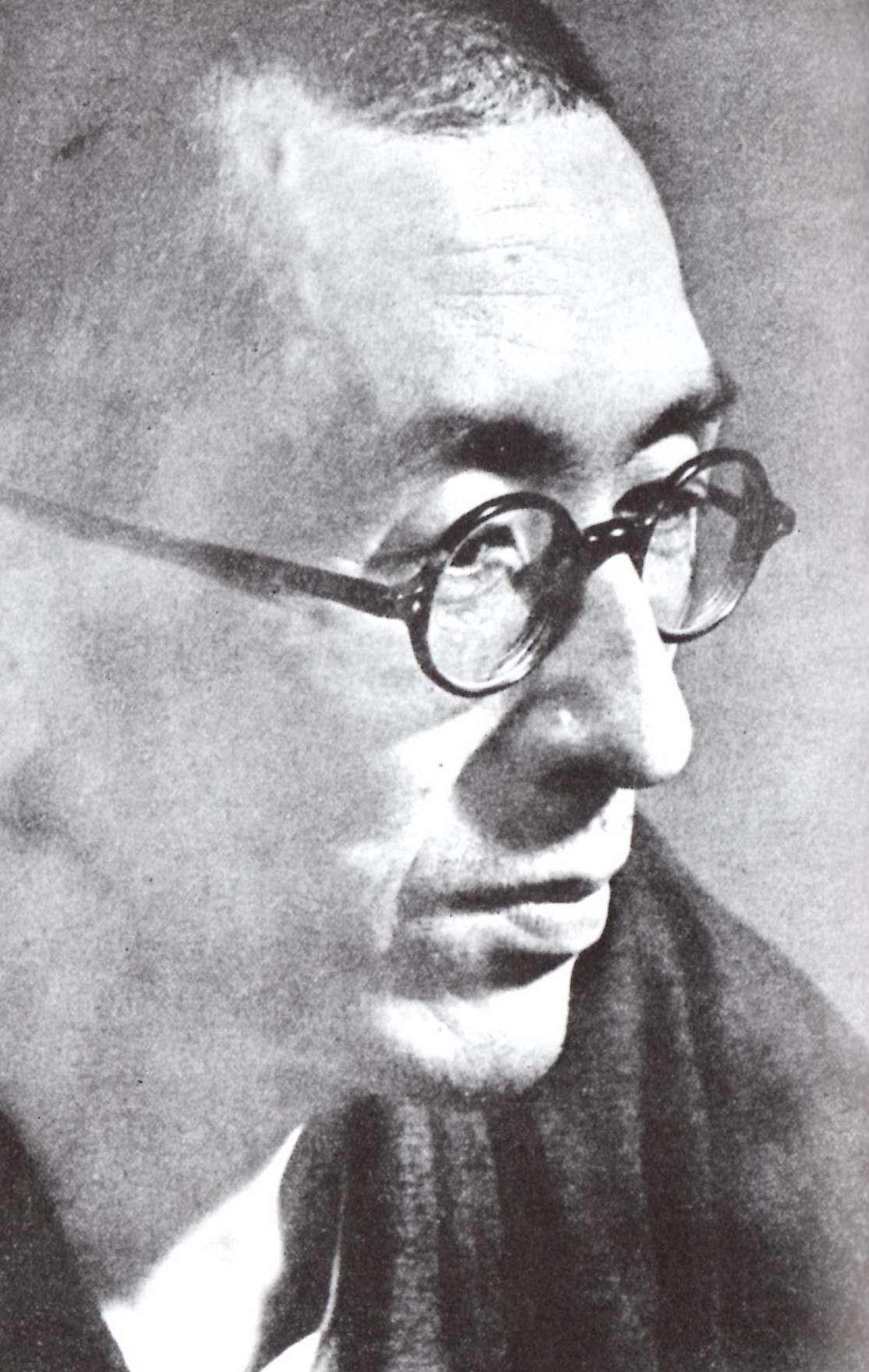
- Photographed in 1941 by Shigeru Tamura
- Born: Keisuke Ōishi; May 13, 1895; Japan、Shizuoka
- Died: April 5, 1984 (aged 88); Japan、Tokyo
- Known for: textile designer

Keisuke Serizawa (芹沢 銈介, Serizawa Keisuke; May 13, 1895 – April 5, 1984) was a Japanese textile designer. In 1956, he was designated as a Living National Treasure by the Japanese government for his katazome stencil dyeing technique. A leading member of the mingei movement founded by Yanagi Sōetsu, Serizawa visited Okinawa several times and learned the Ryūkyū bingata techniques of dyeing. Archaeologist Chōsuke Serizawa was his son.

His folk-art productions included kimono, paper prints, wall scrolls, folding screens, curtains, fans, and calendars. He also produced illustrated books, including Don Quixote, Vincent van Gogh and A Day at Mashiko.

In 1981, the Municipal Serizawa Keisuke Art Museum was opened in the city of Shizuoka. Another museum, the Serizawa Keisuke Art and Craft Museum was opened in 1989 in Sendai. Other museums that hold his work include the Brooklyn Museum, the Metropolitan Museum of Art, the Harvard Art Museums, the Seattle Art Museum, the British Museum, the University of Michigan Museum of Art, and the Museum of New Zealand.

"The distinguishing trait of Serizawa's katazome method is the use of the starch mixture to create, not a colored area as is current in direct-dyeing process, but a blank, undyed one that forms a part of the pattern and that can later be colored by hand in multi-color or monochrome as the designer sees fit."

== See also ==
- List of Living National Treasures of Japan (crafts)
