= Reika Iwami =

Japanese woodblock artist (1927–2020)

- (岩見 禮花 Iwami Reika)
- Born: 1927; Tokyo, Japan
- Died: March 18, 2020 (aged 92–93)
- Education: Bunka Gakuin
- Known for: Woodblock print art
- Style: Wood prints of the natural world with embossing and metal leaf
- Movement: Sōsaku-hanga

Reika Iwami (岩見 禮花 Iwami Reika; born 1927 - March 18, 2020) was a Sōsaku-hanga woodblock printmaker from Tokyo, Japan who worked primarily with abstract compositions. Iwami was among the first women to become well-known in the printmaker community both in and out of Japan. A member of the Sōsaku-hanga movement, she is considered a pioneer in 20th-century print art. Her works consisted of representations of the natural world using monochromatic or subdued colors, embossing, and metal leaf.

== Biography ==
Iwami was born in Tokyo in 1927 but she spent much of her early life on the island of Kyushu. She later lived in Kanagawa. Returning to Tokyo, she studied part time at Bunka Gakuin, and she then spent 11 years studying doll-making with Ryūjo Hori before turning her attention to printmaking in 1954.

She studied with Koshiro Onchi, a prominent founder of the Sōsaku-hanga movement, as well as Onchi’s associates Sekino Jun'ichirō and Shinagawa Takumi, the latter influencing Iwami’s use of driftwood in her prints.

Iwami entered the print art movement after completing her studies. She was one of several women artists who found independent success in 20th-century Japan. While women often helped male print artists, it was uncommon and unusual for a woman to create her own pieces. Iwami joined the Nihon Hanga Kyôkai (Japan Print Association) in 1955, and she would go on to become a co-founder of the Joryû Hanga Kyôkai (Women’s Print Association) in 1957. Alongside other Japanese women print artists, Iwami exhibited her works in both Japan and the United States. Upon the group disbanding in 1965, Iwami returned to independent exhibitions.

Iwami continued making print art pieces throughout the 20th and 21st centuries. Iwami’s prints have been gathered in various private and public collections in Japan and the Anglosphere. They have also been the subject of texts analyzing the Sōsaku-hanga movement, such as James Michener’s The Modern Japanese Print.

Iwami died on March 18, 2020 at the age of 93.

== Prints ==
Iwami's prints frequently feature sumi black ink in solid geometric shapes combined with the organic texture of the wood grain, as well as deeply embossed paper and gold leaf. Rather than use a variety of bright colors, she preferred to use monochromatic hues to bring out the wood texture.

The prints’ subjects were most often abstract images of natural environments and features in Japan. Among these, the most common element was water, which she often showed in flowing patterns through the wood texture.

In 1994, the art dealer Norman Tolman wrote of her work:

"Iwami’s subject is water and its flow, and her genius lies in the almost mystical ability to transmute the grain and texture of pieces of wood she has found into visual images of patterns of water."

Iwami’s abstract representations of nature became popular around the world among print enthusiasts, and her works were considered on par with her male peers. In his 1962 book, The Modern Japanese Print - An Appreciation, James A. Michener described his first encounter with Iwami's prints, and mistaking the work for "another of the gifted young men who were knocking for admission to the ateliers of critical review". Michener concluded that "this Iwami, whoever he was, had already reached a point rather more advanced than competing artists who were just then appearing on the scene." Iwami was a prolific printmaker and among the first women printmakers in Japan to achieve recognition at the same level as her male colleagues.

== Collections ==
During and after Iwami’s lifetime, her prints were gathered in various collections worldwide.

The following is a partial list of collections:

- British Museum
- Museum of Modern Art, Kamakura & Hayama
- MOMA
- Art Gallery of New South Wales
- Cincinnati Art Museum
- Library of Congress
- Art Institute Chicago
- Los Angeles County Museum of Art

== Affiliations ==
Japan Print Association
