= Clifton Karhu =

American artist of Finnish heritage

Clifton Karhu (November 23, 1927 – March 24, 2007) was an American artist of Finnish heritage who settled in Japan after serving there in the U.S. military during World War II and returning as a missionary. He became locally and internationally renowned for his woodblock prints, inspired by ukiyo-e, which he began making in the early 1960s and produced until his death. Karhu became known for using traditional Japanese printmaking methods to create contemporary bold and colorful landscapes of Kyoto and Kanazawa. Karhu became the first foreign member of the Japan Print Association. Japanese media began to describe him as being "more Japanese than a Japanese," because of his adherence to traditional methods of print production.

Karhu sold works to individual collectors as well as to Japanese companies for advertising purposes. His commercial work appeared in public spaces, such as subway stations, and in private institutions, such as restaurants and geisha houses. By the end of his career, Karhu had become a celebrity in the Japanese art scene.

== Biography ==
Karhu was born to a Finnish American family in rural Minnesota, north of Duluth, on November 23, 1927. He developed an interest in art in his early adolescence, inspired by the artistic pursuits of his parents, Arne and Anna Karhu. He graduated from high school in 1946, joined the U.S. Army, and served in Japan in the late 1940s. After his military service, he attended the Minneapolis College of Art and Design, and worked as an educational counselor in Minnesota. He left his art studies over conflicted feelings about the ethics of the art world, believing artists to be little more than people pursuing their own pleasures with the money of the wealthy. In 1955, three years after the end of the American occupation of Japan (1945–1952), Karhu moved to Kyoto as a Lutheran missionary with his wife, Lois. There, he worked at Christian bookshops and as an English teacher and began painting in oil and watercolor for leisure. During this period he is also recorded as having travelled as a missionary and door-to-door Bible salesman through Shiga and Hiroshima. Three years after his ordination, however, Karhu reversed his decision to remain a minister and moved with his family to Gifu Prefecture, a small provincial town northwest of Kyoto, dedicating himself to his artistic pursuits despite ongoing financial difficulties.

Karhu increasingly adopted specific elements of what he perceived to be a Japanese lifestyle. He stopped wearing Western clothing and donned the kimono; spoke Japanese; visited geisha houses; and socialized by going out to drink sake. He also made and played the shakuhachi instrument, and created netsuke and carved seals – practices that reportedly earned him a reputation for being "committed (…) to the value of Japan's culture."

Karhu began to experiment with ukiyo-e woodblock printing in the early 1960s. His work presented everyday scenes of Kyoto and Kanazawa, in the style of architectural genre prints. Karhu depicted monuments, restaurants, residential views, geisha houses, and street scenes. Early in this stage of his career, Karhu sold prints mainly to foreigners. As his international reputation spread, his clientele became increasingly Japanese. By the early 1970s, Karhu's work was well-known within Japan itself, and he became the first non-Japanese member of the Japan Print Association. He was known to be stubborn about his art: he refused to accept criticism but criticized Japanese artists whose works resembled his, on occasions even suggesting that they were committing plagiarism. Karhu had a competitive edge and was known to declare his disdain for group exhibitions, insisting that his presence attracted patrons from whom other artists unfairly profited.

In the early 1980s, Karhu lived in Kyoto, and operated a studio where his apprentices performed artistic tasks under his direction, carving woodblocks by instruction. In the late 1980s, Karhu moved to Kanazawa permanently, separating from his wife Lois. After moving, Karhu began an eighteen-year relationship with his business manager, Michiko Miyake. Although this relationship continued until his death, Lois Karhu nevertheless remained crucial to his career as a consultant for his art business. Karhu died from liver cancer on March 24, 2007, in Kyoto.

== Influences ==
Karhu's work drew inspiration from traditional ukiyo-e woodblock printing. Meaning "floating world," ukiyo-e genre prints depicted recognizable scenes of pleasure. This tradition was born in Edo-era Tokyo (1603–1867), where pictures of actors and courtesans of the entertainment district were mass-printed for the public. Karhu was knowledgeable about the ukiyo-e style, and possessed a private collection of high ukiyo-e art, including prints by Utamaro, Hokusai, and Sharaku, from which he drew inspiration. However, Karhu refused to show his collection of antique prints to anyone, treating them as treasures to savor alone. Throughout his career, Karhu gained a reputation for being a stickler about upholding aspects of ukiyo-e tradition – an insistence that reduced his support among many Japanese artists who openly adopted what they saw as more modern styles.

Karhu began printing in the ukiyo-e style after a local gallery owner and colleague, Yamada Tetsuo, encouraged him to try working in the genre. Tetsuo then introduced Karhu to Californian artist Stanton MacDonald-Wright, a colorist in the 1913 Parisian Synchromism movement. Karhu collaborated with MacDonald-Wright early in his career, and was influenced by MacDonald-Wright's vibrant use of color. The duo made the portfolio Haiga in 1966, of twenty woodcut color prints.

== Style ==
In many ways, Karhu's prints resemble traditional Japanese ukiyo-e landscapes. To start, Karhu used black line art, characteristic of the ukiyo-e genre since its monochromatic debut in the seventeenth century. Karhu then printed vibrant colors atop the line art, mimicking mid-eighteenth-century ukiyo-e which used bright pigments to evoke feelings associated with the "floating world" of pleasure.

Karhu's prints are different in style from ukiyo-e in two ways. First, Karhu used thicker and more blocky lines to contour shapes than the fine graphic lines in traditional ukiyo-e. Second, the colors in his prints appear more saturated than in typical ukiyo-e – even than ones from the Meiji era, which used synthetic (rather than natural) pigments.

== Achievements ==
Before achieving international fame, Karhu was already well-known in Japan as the first non-Japanese member of the Japan Print Association. The organization's goal was to promote Japanese printmaking, by exhibiting internationally and locally, and teaching printmaking in public schools. Additionally, Karhu was known in Kyoto for his print Tomiyo Snow which the municipality featured on one of its subway line tickets, and for large posters of his work that appeared in Sanjo station. As the years went on, Karhu also frequently appeared on the NHK national television network, to discuss his exhibitions. Prominent public figures supported Karhu's artistry: Prince and Princess Takamado of Japan visited him and his works, and the Japanese ambassador to Finland, Hasegawa Kensei, called Karhu "famous."

Karhu rose to international fame when he starred in the Japanin Taide fair in Finland, the country from which his family traced its heritage. The event attracted four percent of the Finnish population. Prince Takamado visited Karhu's exhibition there, bringing the President of Finland and his cabinet. The U.S. Librarian of Congress also attended. For the Finnish President and his wife, Karhu painted his work Time for Flowers live. Later, Karhu's work was featured on the cover of Finnish Reader's Digest.

Karhu gained renown in the United States as well. Many museums collected his prints, including the Museum of Fine Arts in Boston, Harvard's Fogg Art Museum, the Cincinnati Art Museum, and the Yale University Art Gallery. In addition, in 1972, an American TV network commissioned sketch scenes from Karhu in its coverage of the Winter Olympics in Sapporo, Japan.

== Reception ==
Not everybody liked Karhu's art. Members of the avant-garde art scene in Japan, many of whom were looking to the West for new sources of inspiration, reportedly saw Karhu's insistence on sticking to the ancient techniques and representational style of woodblock printing as outdated, regressive, or pretentious. Among broader members of the Japanese public, the reception to Karhu's work was warmer. Many Japanese appeared to accept Karhu as an artistic leader in the context of Japan's modernization under American influence in the aftermath of World War II.

== Legacy ==
In 1986, near the end of his active career as an artist, The Los Angeles Times described Karhu as the "best-known defender of tradition in an artistic culture busily trying to keep up with Western innovation," and "credited [him] with redefining and reinvigorating an ancient printing technique". Karhu died in 2007, but his art persisted in museum collections, books, and commercial media, even becoming emblazoned on T-shirts sold on the Internet.
