= Kappazuri =

Type of Japanese print

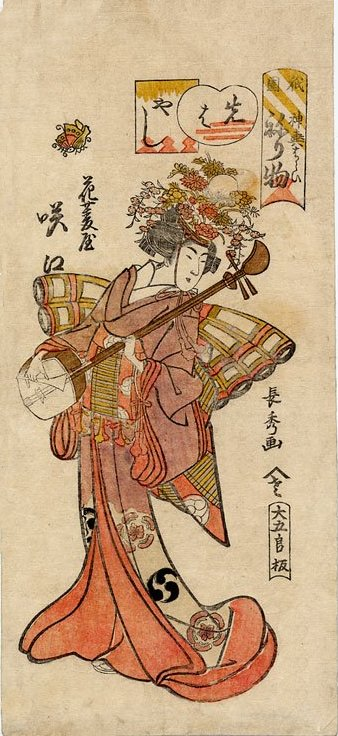
Print by Urakusai Nagahide titled Sakie of the Hanabishiya

Kappazuri (合羽摺), also known as kappa-zuri, kappazuri-e (合羽摺絵), and as katagamizuri-e (型紙摺絵), are Japanese prints printed in a single color (usually black) from woodblocks and then colored by stenciling. Prints produced entirely by stenciling, without woodblocks, are also called kappazuri. Kappazuri may be identified by the presence of visible brushstrokes, unevenness of color, pooling of ink at the margins of the stencil cutouts, and gaps or overlaps between colored areas and black outlines.

Although also produced in Edo (Tokyo), Kappazuri are more closely associated with prints from Osaka and Kyoto. The most prolific designer of Kappazuri was Urakusai Nagahide, and the most abundant examples are his depictions of the annual costume parade in the Gion district of Kyoto.
