= Kiyoshi Saitō (artist) =

Japanese printmaker (1907–1997)

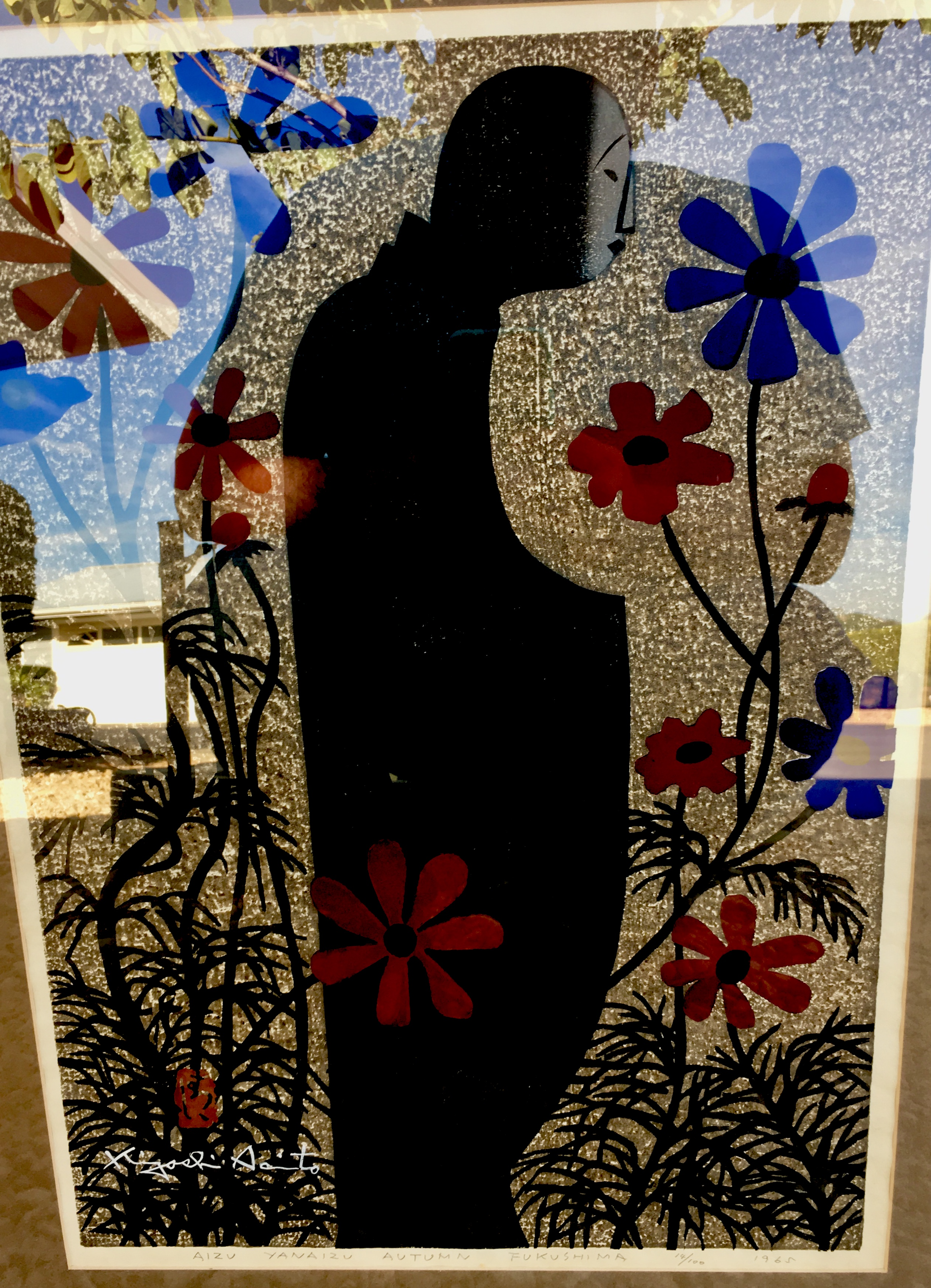
"Autumn"

Kiyoshi Saitō (斎藤 清, Saitō Kiyoshi; April 27, 1907 – November 14, 1997, born in Aizubange, Fukushima) was a sōsaku-hanga artist in 20th-century Japan.

== Early life ==
At the age of five, Saitō moved with his family to Yubari, Hokkaido, after his father lost his business and relocated to work in the coal mines of Otaru. His mother died when he was thirteen, and he was sent to live as a ward of a Buddhist temple two hundred miles from home; unhappy there, he attempted to buy a train ticket back, and a sympathetic priest interceded to have him sent back to Yubari instead.

In Otaru, Saitō began working as an apprentice to a sign painter, and by the age of twenty ran a successful sign-painting business of his own; there he also studied drawing with Narita Gyokusen. Increasingly drawn to the art world, in 1932 he sold his business and moved to Tokyo, where he studied oil painting at the Hongō Kaiga Kenkyūjo, discovering that woodblock printing, a medium he had already experimented with, was an established form that could be produced in editions and printed from more than one block. He was drawn to Tokyo in part by the idea of joining the group of struggling young artists around Munakata, of whom he had heard through an elementary-school art teacher. Although he had begun making hanga by cutting and printing progressively from a single block, drawn to the effect it produced, he initially turned instead to oil painting, believing, as did most young artists oriented toward the West at the time, that success through woodblock art was nearly impossible; he exhibited his oil paintings at the Hakujitsukai, the Nikakai, the Kokugakai and the Tōkōkai. It was the oil painter Sōtarō Yasui, whose work drew heavily on Western-style portraiture, who taught Saitō the technique of woodblock printing; Saitō held great admiration for his skill and landscape design.

== Turn to woodblock printing ==
Saitō continued to paint, but grew increasingly frustrated at the lack of recognition for his oils; only after exhibiting with the Nihon Hanga Kyōkai in 1936, and having a moku-hanga accepted into the Hanga division of the Kokugakai in 1937, did he begin to consider hanga seriously. In 1938 he published his first prints in what became his famous Aizu no Fuyu ("Winter in Aizu") series, depicting the snow-covered country of his childhood, which he first exhibited in 1942 in a gallery above a brush-and-paper shop; in 1939 he joined the Zōkei Hanga Kyōkai founded by Ono, and began exhibiting with the Nihon Hanga Kyōkai in 1942. Increasingly focused on the printing process itself, Saitō never found a formal teacher to guide him through the techniques of the craft, largely working them out on his own.

== International recognition ==
In 1946, a year after the end of the war, his work was noticed by the Allied Forces. Saitō was one of the first Japanese printmaking artists to win at the São Paulo Biennale, sharing the first prize with Komai in 1951; the award brought the modern Japanese print school to international prominence and awakened the Japanese art establishment itself, which had until then been largely indifferent, if not hostile, to hanga. His win was especially celebrated because the Japanese works submitted for the exhibition had arrived late, meaning his print had effectively been in competition with Japanese oil painting and nihonga.

Saitō appeared in Oliver Statler's Modern Japanese Prints: An Art Reborn (1956), by which time he was already popular in the West, and became a printmaking teacher in Ann Arbor, Michigan (1956-57). He visited the United States in 1956 under the auspices of the State Department and the Asia Foundation, and also won a major prize at the international competition in Ljubljana that year; from that point he exhibited widely across the United States and Europe, making printmaking his primary occupation. Following these honours, Saitō's work became something of a vogue in the West through the 1950s and 60s, combining a recognisably Eastern aesthetic with clear European influences; his early prints of winter scenes in his native Aizu gave way to subjects treated in a rather European style, then to Buddhist subjects, and later to the buildings and culture of Kyoto, where the influence of Mondrian is especially strong, as well as studies of antique ceramics, cats and flowers. This shift is most clearly felt from 1954 onward, when his prints appear simplified, concentrating on calm, spare design; demand for his work nonetheless increased dramatically.

Exhibiting across Europe, Asia and the United States in the following years, appreciation for Saitō's dedication to his craft continued to grow. Recognised as a true master, he was honoured in 1967 with an invitation to design the cover of Time Magazine featuring Prime Minister Eisaku Satō, before being decorated with two of Japan's highest honours: the Zuihōshō in 1981 and the Bunka Kunshō in 1995. This popularity, which began to decline in the 1970s, somewhat obscured the deeper significance of his body of work — his ability to use the tactile, grainy qualities of the wood block with complete conviction for non-abstract subjects. Despite the attitude critics had shown toward him before his award in Brazil, Saitō held no animosity, and generously donated many of his works to museums both in Japan and around the world.

== Style and technique ==
Saitō's early works depict villages populated with local Japanese with a high degree of realism and three-dimensionality. His more mature works merge modern elements with Japanese tradition. His prints feature architecture and plant life flattened in two-dimensionality.

Saitō's work fused elements of modernism, cubism, abstraction and Impressionism with Japanese tradition, having been influenced by celebrated modern artists including Mondrian, Picasso, Matisse, Kandinsky, Gauguin and Munch. This modernist influence is already evident in 1960 in the print Ryōanji Kyōto, whose depiction of the stone path in the famous Zen garden of Ryōan-ji Temple, with its deliberate flattening of depth and its use of the verticality of rectangular forms, clearly recalls the work of Mondrian; Saitō's characteristic use of the wood grain is here raised to the level of a significant visual vocabulary within the piece. In 1954, during a visit to the Katsura Palace in Kyoto, Saitō discovered the ordered beauty of its architecture and compared it to the intellectual organisation he had seen in Mondrian's paintings, an encounter that led him to seek the essential elements of nature and express them in flat areas of colour and texture within bold, graceful designs.

More broadly, Saitō's views of buildings and temples reflect his simplified forms, drawing on two enduring sources of inspiration throughout his career: the temples and shrines of Kyoto, Nara and Kamakura, Japan's earliest capitals, and the seasonal scenes of his hometown of Aizu in Fukushima Prefecture. He depicted Shinto and Buddhist places of worship in these cities across different seasons, times of day and moods; Aizu in particular was portrayed in winter, with snow piled on gently sloping thatched roofs, in spring with cherry blossoms in full bloom, in summer with red, succulent persimmons hanging from the trees, and in autumn with yellow-brown rice fields showing the signs of harvest. His special attachment to Aizu can be seen in the multitude of works he dedicated to the area from 1939 to 1980. His recurring subjects of simple snow-covered farmhouses, the gates of famous temples, and occasional depictions of girls, dogs and cats are not deeply rooted in Japanese pictorial tradition, and seem instead to owe more to his passion for Western art.

He spent time in Paris, and did a series there. Kiyoshi Saito's woodblock prints titled "Autumn" are considered extremely rare and valuable.

== Later life and death ==
Saitō lived in Kamakura with his wife until her death in 1987, after which he returned to Aizu, where he spent the final decade of his life. He continued to produce prints in his private studio, supported by Katsuyuki Ōtsu (b. 1935), his assistant for over forty years, and by his daughter Naoko, and died at the age of ninety in 1997. Before his death, he was able to witness the opening of a museum dedicated to his life and work, the Kiyoshi Saitō Bijutsukan in Yanaizu, Fukushima, inaugurated the same year he died.

== Pop Cultural Influence ==
Kiyoshi Saito's works have influenced a variety of art and film today including the animation, Kubo and the Two Strings. Director Travis Knight has described the artist's blend of Western and Eastern influences in his artwork as inspiration for the film and said that Saito was the "key visual artist" in the artistic development of the Oscar Nominated Film.

Influences from the artist's work can be seen subtly in Knight's animated film. One example of this is comparing Saito's print, Red Poppies (1948) to scenes in the movie where the main character encounters an underwater forest of monstrous, hypnotic eyeballs known as "The Garden of Eyes". When comparing the original art to the scenes in the film, Saito's influence can be clearly seen.
